= Hesse =

State in Germany

State of Hesse Land Hessen
- State
- Flag Coat of arms
- Anthem: Hessenlied "Song of Hesse"
- Interactive map of State of Hesse
- Coordinates: 50°36′29″N 9°01′42″E
- Country: Germany
- Capital: Wiesbaden
- Largest city: Frankfurt am Main

Government
  - Body: Landtag of Hesse
  - Minister-President: Boris Rhein (CDU)
  - Governing parties: CDU / SPD
  - Bundesrat votes: 5 (of 69)
  - Bundestag seats: 45 (of 630) (as of 2025)

Area
  - Total: 21,115.62 km^{2} (8,152.79 sq mi)

Population (2023-12-31)
  - Total: 6,420,729
  - Density: 304.0749/km^{2} (787.5502/sq mi)
- Demonym: Hessian

GDP
  - Total: €382.411 billion (2025)
  - Per capita: €60,567 (2025)
- Time zone: UTC+1 (CET)
  - Summer (DST): UTC+2 (CEST)
- ISO 3166 code: DE-HE
- NUTS Region: DE7
- HDI (2022): 0.954 very high · 5th of 16
- Website: hessen.de

Hesse (Note: /hɛs/ HESS, US also /ˈhɛsə, ˈhɛsi/ HESS-ə, HESS-ee; Hessian dialect: [ˈhɛzə].) or Hessen (Note: Sometimes known as Hessia in English (UK: /ˈhɛsiə/ HESS-ee-ə, US: /ˈhɛʃə/ HESH-ə)) (German pronunciation: [ˈhɛsn̩]), officially the State of Hesse (German: Land Hessen), is a landlocked state in Germany. Its capital city is Wiesbaden, and the largest urban area is Frankfurt am Main, which is also the country's principal financial centre. Two other major historic cities are Darmstadt and Kassel. With an area of 21,114.73 square kilometers and a population of over six million, it ranks seventh and fifth, respectively, among the sixteen German states. Frankfurt Rhine-Main, Germany's second-largest metropolitan area (after Rhine-Ruhr), is mainly located in Hesse.

Hesse is one of Germany's richest states in terms of GRDP per capita. Being home to the European Central Bank and the Deutsche Bundesbank, both located in Frankfurt, the state is a major financial hub in Europe. As a cultural region, Hesse also includes the area known as Rhenish Hesse (Rheinhessen) in the neighboring state of Rhineland-Palatinate.

== Etymology ==
The German name Hessen, like the names of other German regions (Schwaben "Swabia", Franken "Franconia", Bayern "Bavaria", Sachsen "Saxony"), derives from the dative plural form of the name of the inhabitants or eponymous tribe, the Hessians (Hessen, singular Hesse). The geographical name represents a short equivalent of the older compound name Hessenland ("land of the Hessians"). The Old High German form of the name is recorded as Hessun (dative plural of Hessi); in Middle Latin it appears as Hassonia, Hassia, Hessia. The name of the Hessians ultimately continues the tribal name of the Chatti. The ancient name Chatti by the 7th century is recorded as Chassi, and from the 8th century as Hassi or Hessi.

An inhabitant of Hesse is called a "Hessian" (German: Hesse (masculine), plural Hessen, or Hessin (feminine), plural Hessinnen). The American English term "Hessian" for 18th-century British auxiliary troops originates with Landgrave Frederick II of Hesse-Kassel hiring out regular army units to the government of Great Britain to fight in the American Revolutionary War.

The English form Hesse was in common use by the 18th century, first in the hyphenated names of the states of Hesse-Cassel and Hesse-Darmstadt, but the latinate form Hessia remained in common English usage well into the 19th century.

The European Commission uses the German form Hessen, even in English-language contexts.

The synthetic element hassium, number 108 on the periodic table, was named after the state of Hesse in 1997, following a proposal of 1992.

== History ==
The territory of Hesse was delineated only in 1945, as Greater Hesse, under American occupation. It corresponds loosely to the medieval Landgraviate of Hesse. In the 19th century, prior to the Unification of Germany, the territory of what is now Hesse comprised the territories of Grand Duchy of Hesse (also known as Hesse-Darmstadt), the Duchy of Nassau, the free city of Frankfurt, the Electorate of Hesse (also known as Hesse-Kassel), the Principality of Waldeck and the Landgraviate of Hesse-Homburg.

=== Early history ===
The Central Hessian region was inhabited in the Upper Paleolithic. Finds of tools in southern Hesse in Rüsselsheim suggest the presence of Pleistocene hunters about 13,000 years ago. A fossil hominid skull that was found in northern Hesse, just outside the village of Rhünda, has been dated at 12,000 years ago. The Züschen tomb (German: Steinkammergrab von Züschen, sometimes also Lohne-Züschen) is a prehistoric burial monument, located between Lohne and Züschen, near Fritzlar, Hesse, Germany. Classified as a gallery grave or a Hessian-Westphalian stone cist (hessisch-westfälische Steinkiste), it is one of the most important megalithic monuments in Central Europe. Dating to c. 3000 BC, it belongs to the Late Neolithic Wartberg culture.

An early Celtic presence in what is now Hesse is indicated by a mid-5th-century BCE La Tène-style burial uncovered at Glauberg. The region was later settled by the Germanic Chatti tribe around the 1st century BCE, and the name Hesse is a continuation of that tribal name.

The ancient Romans had a military camp in Dorlar, and in Waldgirmes directly on the eastern outskirts of Wetzlar was a civil settlement under construction. Presumably, the provincial government for the occupied territories of the right bank of Germania was planned at this location. The governor of Germania, at least temporarily, likely had resided here. The settlement appears to have been abandoned by the Romans after the devastating Battle of the Teutoburg Forest failed in the year AD 9. The Chatti were also involved in the Revolt of the Batavi in AD 69.

Hessia, from the early 7th century on, served as a buffer between areas dominated by the Saxons (to the north) and the Franks, who brought the area to the south under their control in the early sixth century and occupied Thuringia (to the east) in 531. Hessia occupies the northwestern part of the modern German state of Hesse; its borders were not clearly delineated. Its geographic center is Fritzlar; it extends in the southeast to Hersfeld on the river Fulda, in the north to past Kassel and up to the rivers Diemel and Weser. To the west, it occupies the valleys of the rivers Eder and Lahn (the latter until it turns south). It measured roughly 90 kilometers north–south, and 80 north-west.

The area around Fritzlar shows evidence of significant pagan belief from the 1st century on. Geismar was a particular focus of such activity; it was continuously occupied from the Roman period on, with a settlement from the Roman period, which itself had a predecessor from the 5th century BC. Excavations have produced a horse burial and bronze artifacts. A possible religious cult may have centered on a natural spring in Geismar, called Heilgenbron; the name "Geismar" (possibly "energetic pool") itself may be derived from that spring. The village of Maden, Gudensberg, now a part of Gudensberg near Fritzlar and less than ten miles from Geismar, was likely an ancient religious center; the basaltic outcrop of Gudensberg is named after Wodan, and a two-meter tall quartzite megalith called the Wotanstein is at the center of the village.

By the mid-7th century, the Franks had established themselves as overlords, which is suggested by archeological evidence of burials, and they built fortifications in various places, including Christenberg. By 690, they took direct control over Hessia, apparently to counteract expansion by the Saxons, who built fortifications in Gaulskopf and Eresburg across the river Diemel, the northern boundary of Hessia. The Büraburg (which already had a Frankish settlement in the sixth century) was one of the places the Franks fortified to resist the Saxon pressure, and according to John-Henry Clay, the Büraburg was "probably the largest man-made construction seen in Hessia for at least seven hundred years". Walls and trenches totaling one kilometer in length were made, and they enclosed "8 hectares of a spur that offered a commanding view over Fritzlar and the densely-populated heart of Hessia".

Following Saxon incursions into Chattish territory in the 7th century, two gaue had been established; a Frankish one, comprising an area around Fritzlar and Kassel, and a Saxonian one. In the 9th century, the Saxon Hessengau also came under the rule of the Franconians.

=== Holy Roman Empire ===
The Ludovingian coat of arms with its lion rampant barry argent and gules, the so-called lion of Hesse

From 962 the land which would become Hesse was part of the Holy Roman Empire. In the 10th and 11th centuries it was mostly encompassed by the Western or Rhenish part of the stem duchy of Franconia.

In the 12th century, Hessengau passed to the Landgraviate of Thuringia. As a result of the War of the Thuringian Succession (1247–1264) the former Thuringian lands were partitioned between the Wettin Margraviate of Meissen, which gained Thuringia proper, and the new Landgraviate of Hesse, which remained with the Ludovingians. From that point on the Ludovingian coat of arms came to represent both Thuringia and Hesse.

It rose to prominence under Landgrave Philip the Magnanimous, who was one of the leaders of German Protestantism. After Philip's death in 1567, the territory was divided among his four sons from his first marriage (Philip was a bigamist) into four lines: Hesse-Kassel (or Hesse-Cassel), Hesse-Darmstadt, Hesse-Rheinfels, and the also previously existing Hesse-Marburg. As the latter two lines died out quite quickly (1583 and 1605, respectively), Hesse-Kassel and Hesse-Darmstadt were the two core states within the Hessian lands. Several collateral lines split off during the centuries, such as in 1622, when Hesse-Homburg split off from Hesse-Darmstadt, and in 1760 when Hesse-Hanau split off from Hesse-Kassel. In the late 16th century, Kassel adopted Calvinism, while Darmstadt remained Lutheran and consequently the two lines often found themselves on opposing sides of conflicts, most notably in the disputes over Hesse-Marburg and in the Thirty Years' War, when Darmstadt fought on the side of the Emperor, while Kassel sided with Sweden and France.

Coat of arms of Hesse-Darmstadt

The Landgrave Frederick II (1720–1785) ruled Hesse-Kassel as a benevolent despot, from 1760 to 1785. He combined Enlightenment ideas with Christian values, cameralist plans for central control of the economy, and a militaristic approach toward diplomacy. He funded the depleted treasury of the poor government by loaning 19,000 soldiers in complete military formations to Great Britain to fight in North America during the American Revolutionary War, 1776–1783. These soldiers, commonly known as Hessians, fought under the British flag. The British used the Hessians in several conflicts, including in the Irish Rebellion of 1798. For further revenue, the soldiers were loaned to other places as well. Most were conscripted, with their pay going to the Landgrave.

=== Modern history ===
Coat of arms of the Grand Duchy of Hesse

==== French Revolution and Napoleonic Wars ====
In 1789, the French Revolution began and in 1794, during the War of the First Coalition, the French Republic occupied the Left Bank of the Rhine, including part of Lower Katzenelnbogen (Niedergrafschaft Katzenelnbogen, Hesse-Kassel's part of the former County of Katzenelnbogen which was held by the appanage Hesse-Rotenburg). Emperor Francis II formally recognised the annexation of the Left Bank in the 1801 Treaty of Lunéville. This led in 1803 to the Reichsdeputationshauptschluss, a substantial reorganisation (mediatisation) of the states and territories of the Empire. Several exclaves of Mainz were mediatised to Hesse-Kassel and Hesse-Darmstadt, and Hesse-Darmstadt also gained the Duchy of Westphalia from Cologne, the parts of Worms on the right-bank of the Rhine, and the former Free City of Friedberg. Nassau-Weilburg gained the right-bank territories of Trier among other territories. Orange-Nassau gained the Prince-Bishopric of Fulda (as the Principality of Nassau-Orange-Fulda). The Landgrave of Hesse-Kassel was also elevated to the status of Prince-Elector (Kurfürst), with his state thereby becoming the Electorate of Hesse or Electoral Hesse (German: Kurhessen, Kur being the German-language term for the Empire's College of Electors).

In July 1806 Hesse-Darmstadt, Nassau-Weilburg, Nassau-Usingen, and the newly merged Principality of Isenburg became founding members of Napoleon's Confederation of the Rhine. Hesse-Darmstadt expanded further in the resulting mediatisation, absorbing numerous small states (including Hesse-Homburg and much of the territory of the Houses of Solms, Erbach and Sayn-Wittgenstein). It was also elevated by Napoleon to the status of Grand Duchy, becoming the Grand Duchy of Hesse. Orange-Nassau, which refused to join the Confederation, lost Siegen, Dillenburg, Hadamar and Beilstein to Berg and Fulda to the Prince-Primate of the Confederation (and former Elector of Mainz) Karl Theodor von Dalberg; the remainder of its territory was merged with that of Nassau-Usingen and Nassau-Weilburg in August 1806 to form the Duchy of Nassau. Waldeck also joined the Confederation in 1807.

The Holy Roman Empire was dissolved in August 1806, rendering Hesse-Kassel's electoral privilege meaningless. Hesse-Kassel was occupied by the French in October 1806 and the remainder of Lower Katzenelnbogen was annexed to the French Empire as Pays réservé de Catzenellenbogen. The rest of its territory was annexed to the Kingdom of Westphalia in 1807; Hesse-Hanau (a secundogeniture of Hesse-Kassel) was annexed to the Grand Duchy of Frankfurt in 1810 along with the other territories held by the Prince-primate: Frankfurt, Fulda, Aschaffenburg and Wetzlar.

As a result of the German campaign of 1813 the Kingdom of Westphalia and the Grand Duchy of Frankfurt were dissolved and Hesse-Kassel and Hesse-Hanau were restored; Orange-Nassau was also restored in its territories previously lost to Berg.

As a result of the 1815 Congress of Vienna Hesse-Kassel gained Fulda (roughly the western third of the former Prince-Bishopric, the rest of which went to Bavaria and Saxe-Weimar-Eisenach) from Frankfurt and part of Isenburg, while several of its small northern exclaves were absorbed into Hanover, some small eastern areas were ceded to Saxe-Weimar-Eisenach and Lower Katzenelnbogen was ceded to Nassau. Hesse-Darmstadt lost the Duchy of Westphalia and the Sayn-Wittgensteiner lands to the Prussian Province of Westphalia but gained territory on the left bank of the Rhine centred on Mainz, which became known as Rhenish Hesse (Rheinhessen), and the remainder of Isenburg. Orange-Nassau, whose ruler was now also King William I of the Netherlands and Grand Duke of Luxembourg, was ceded to Prussia but most of its territory aside from Siegen was then ceded on to Nassau. Hesse-Homburg and the Free City of Frankfurt were also restored.

While the other former Electors had gained other titles, becoming either Kings or Grand Dukes, the Elector of Hesse-Kassel alone retained the anachronistic title of Prince-Elector; a request to be recognised as "King of the Chatti" (König der Katten) was rejected by the Congress.

Following mediation, the Congress of Vienna had significantly fewer states remained in the region that is now Hesse: the Hessian states, Nassau, Waldeck and Frankfurt. The Kingdoms of Prussia and Bavaria also held some territory in the region. The Congress established the German Confederation, of which they all became members. Hesse-Hanau was (re-)absorbed into Hesse-Kassel in 1821.

==== German Empire ====
In the 1866 Austro-Prussian War the states of the region allied with Austria were defeated during the Campaign of the Main. Following Prussia's victory and dissolution of the German Confederation, Prussia annexed Electoral Hesse, Frankfurt, Hesse-Homburg, Nassau and small parts of Bavaria and the Grand Duchy of Hesse, which were then combined into the Province of Hesse-Nassau. The name Kurhessen survived, denoting the region around Kassel. The Grand Duchy of Hesse retained its autonomy in defeat because a greater part of the country was situated south of the river Main and it was feared that Prussian expansion beyond the Main might provoke France. However, Upper Hesse (German: Oberhessen: the parts of Hesse-Darmstadt north of the Main around the town of Gießen) was incorporated into the North German Confederation (Norddeutscher Bund), a tight federation of German states established by Prussia in 1867, while also remaining part of the Grand Duchy. In 1871, after France's defeat in the Franco-Prussian War, the whole of the Grand Duchy joined the German Empire.

Around the turn of the 20th century, Darmstadt was one of the centres of the Jugendstil. Until 1907, the Grand Duchy of Hesse used the Hessian red and white lion barry as its coat-of-arms.

==== Weimar and Nazi periods ====
The revolution of 1918 following the German defeat in WWI transformed Hesse-Darmstadt from a monarchy to a republic, which officially renamed itself the People's State of Hesse (Volksstaat Hessen). The state parliament, or Landtag consisted of 70 deputies elected on the basis of proportional representation. There were six Landtag elections between 1919 and 1932. Following the Nazi seizure of power in Berlin, the Landtag was formally abolished as a result of the "Law on the Reconstruction of the Reich" of 30 January 1934, which replaced the German federal system with a unitary state.

The parts of Hesse-Darmstadt on the left bank of the Rhine (Rhenish Hesse), as well as those right-bank areas of Hesse-Darmstadt and Hesse-Nassau within 30 km (19 mi) of Koblenz or Mainz were occupied by French troops until 1930 under the terms of the Versailles peace treaty that officially ended World War I in 1919. The Kingdom of Prussia became the Free State of Prussia, of which Hesse-Nassau remained a province.

In 1929, the Free State of Waldeck was dissolved and incorporated into Hesse-Nassau. In 1932 Wetzlar (Landkreis Wetzlar), formerly an exclave of the Prussian Rhine Province situated between Hesse-Nassau and the Grand Duchy's Upper Hesse, was transferred to Hesse-Nassau. The former Hessian exclave of Rinteln (Kreis Rinteln, the Hessian part of the former County of Schaumburg) was also detached and transferred to the Province of Hanover.

On 1 July 1944, the Prussian Province of Hesse-Nassau was formally divided into the provinces of Kurhessen and Nassau. At the same time the former Hessian Schmalkalden exclaves (Landkreis Herrschaft Schmalkalden), together with the Regierungsbezirk Erfurt of the Province of Saxony, were transferred to Thuringia. The territories of the new provinces did not directly correspond with their pre-1866 namesakes but rather with the associated NSDAP Gaue: Gau Electoral Hesse and Gau Hesse-Nassau (excluding the areas which were part of the People's State of Hesse).

==== Post-World War II ====
After World War II, the Hessian territory west of the Rhine was again occupied by France, while the rest of the region was part of the US occupation zone. On 17 September 1945 the Wanfried agreement adjusted the border between American-occupied Kurhessen and Soviet-occupied Thuringia. The United States proclaimed the state of Greater Hesse (Groß-Hessen) on 19 September 1945, out of the People's State of Hesse and most of what had been the Prussian Provinces of Kurhessen and Nassau. The French incorporated their parts of Hesse (Rhenish Hesse) and Nassau (as Regierungsbezirk Montabaur) into the newly founded state of Rhineland-Palatinate (Rheinland-Pfalz) on 30 August 1946.

On 4 December 1946, Greater Hesse was officially renamed Hessen. Hesse in the 1940s received more than a million displaced ethnic Germans.

Due to its proximity to the Inner German border, Hesse became an important location of NATO installations in the 1950s, especially military bases of the US V Corps and United States Army Europe.

The first elected minister president of Hesse was Christian Stock, followed by Georg-August Zinn (both Social Democrats). The German Social Democrats gained an absolute majority in 1962 and pursued progressive policies with the so-called Großer Hessenplan. The CDU gained a relative majority in the 1974 elections, but the Social Democrats continued to govern in a coalition with the FDP. Hesse was first governed by the CDU under Walter Wallmann during 1987–1991, replaced by a SPD-Greens coalition under Hans Eichel during 1991–1999. From 1999, Hesse was governed by the CDU under Roland Koch (retired 2010) and Volker Bouffier (incumbent as of 2020). Frankfurt during the 1960s to 1990s developed into one of the major cities of West Germany. As of 2016, 12% of the total population of Hesse lived in the city of Frankfurt.

== Geography ==
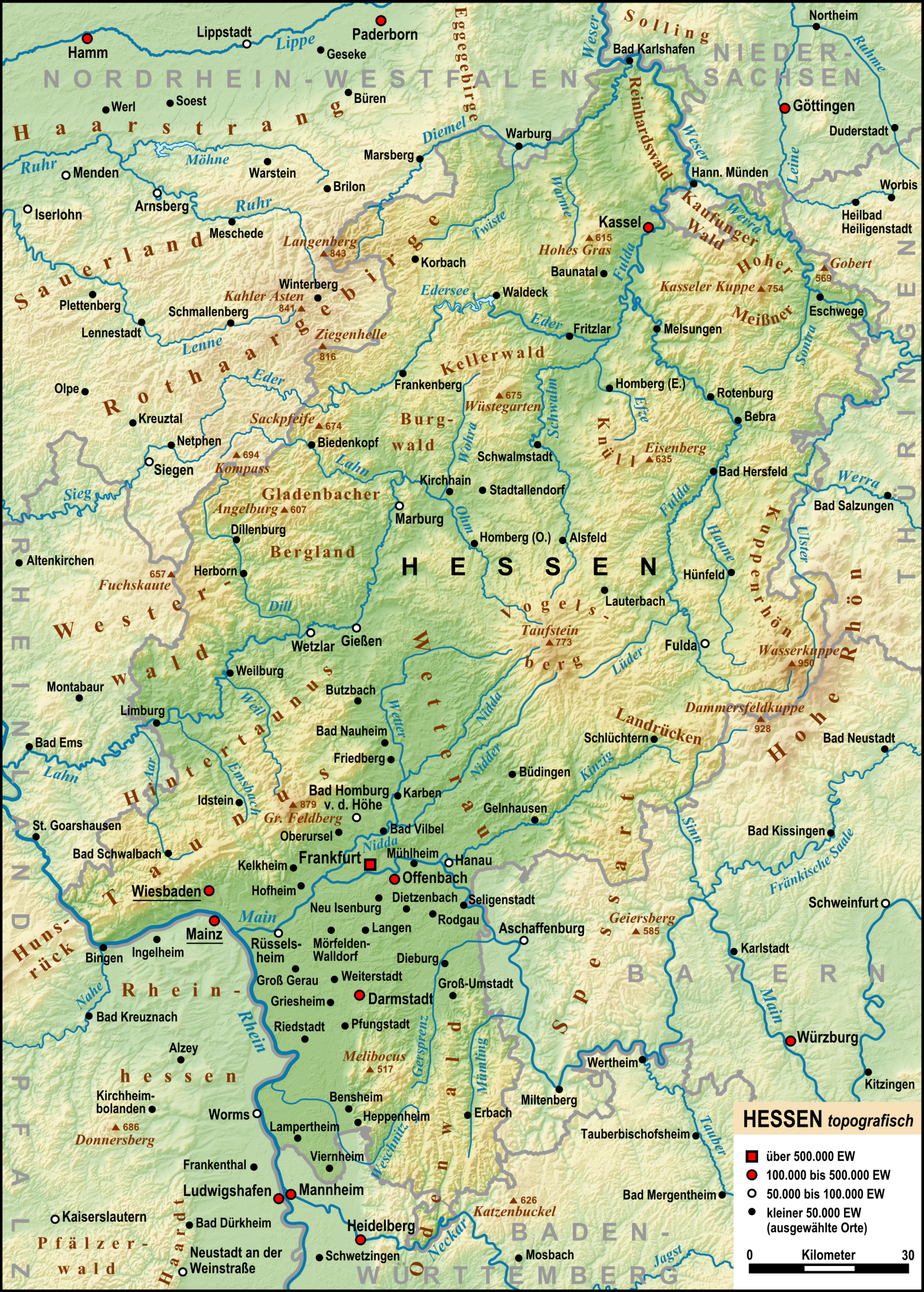
The most important rivers, mountains, and cities of Hesse

The only state to straddle west and central portions of Germany where the eight ordinal directions (compass points) and the centre is considered, Hesse borders six other states. These are, from north, clockwise: Lower Saxony, Thuringia, Bavaria, Baden-Württemberg, Rhineland-Palatinate, and North Rhine-Westphalia.

The most populous towns and cities of Hesse are in the southwest, the Frankfurt Rhein-Main Region namely Frankfurt am Main, Wiesbaden, Darmstadt, Offenbach, Hanau, Giessen, Wetzlar, and Rüsselsheim am Main. Outside, but very near the south-west corner of Hesse are four populous, highly technologised, places: Worms, Ludwigshafen, Mannheim, and Heidelberg.

Other large Hessian towns are Fulda in the east, Kassel and Marburg an der Lahn in the north and Limburg an der Lahn in the west. All of the "on the river" suffixes are locally and, informally far beyond, omitted of these cities. The plain between the rivers Main, Rhine, and lower Neckar, and the Odenwald ridge of low mountains or very high hills is called the Ried which continues to north, across the Main, as the Wetterau. Both plains which are quite densely populated also have a substantial built environment such as the country's largest airport, contrasting with the more forested, hillier middle and northern thirds of Hesse.

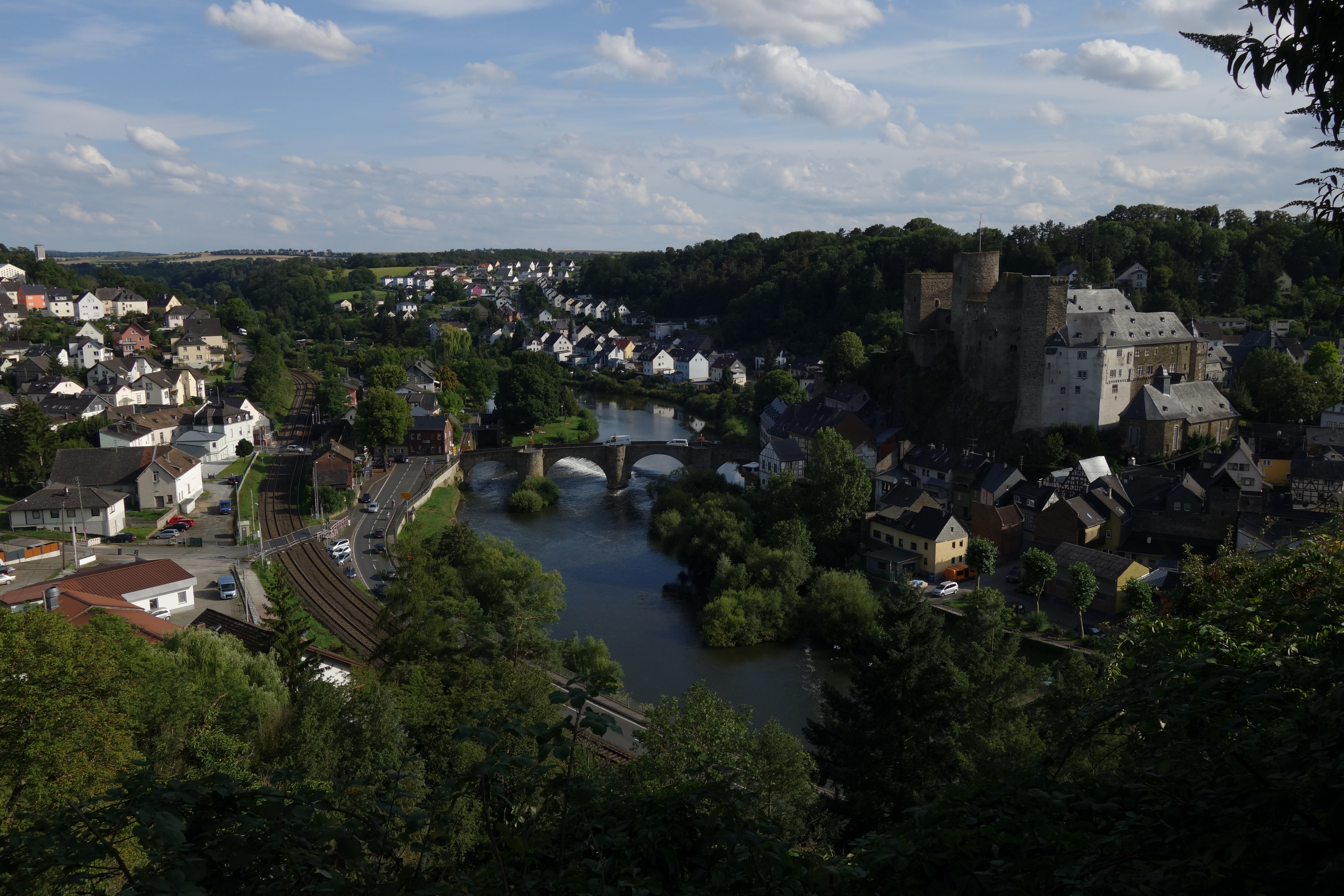
River Lahn in Runkel

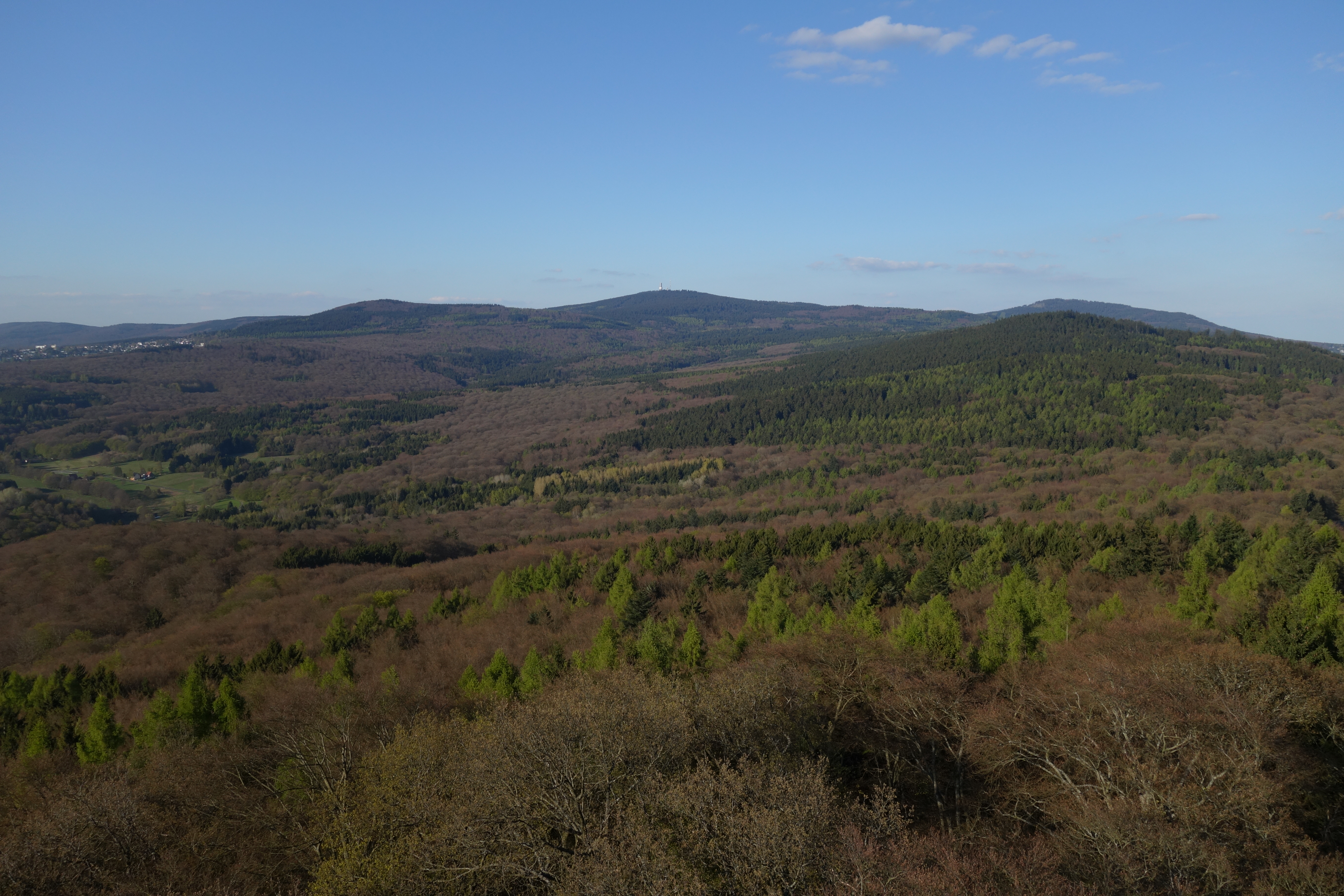
Taunus landscape with Großer Feldberg in the center of the background

The longest rivers in Hesse are the Eder and moreover its distributary the Fulda draining most of the north, the Lahn in the centre-west and, as to those navigable by large vessels, the Main and very broad Rhine in the south. The countryside is hilly and the topographical map, inset, names 14 short, low to medium-height mountain ranges including the Rhön, the Westerwald, the Taunus, the Vogelsberg, the Knüll and the Spessart. The notable range forming the southern taper of Hesse (shared with a narrowing of the Ried, the Rhine's eastern plain) and briefly spanning the middle Neckar valley which begins directly east of Heidelberg (thus also in Baden-Württemberg) is the Odenwald. Forming a mid-eastern tiny projection into mostly Thuringia is the uppermost part of the Ulster, commanding the west valley side of which is the Hessian highest point, Wasserkuppe at 950m above sea level – in the Rhön.

The Rhine forms the long southwest border of Hesse. Two notables oxbow lakes, the Stockstadt-Erfelder Altrhein and Lampertheimer Altrhein are in the south-west fringe.

Hesse, 42% forest, is by that measure the greenest state in Germany.

== Administrative divisions ==
Hesse is a unitary state governed directly by the Hessian government in the capital city Wiesbaden, partially through regional vicarious authorities called Regierungspräsidien. Municipal parliaments are, however, elected independently from the state government by the Hessian people. Local municipalities enjoy a considerable degree of home rule.

=== Districts ===
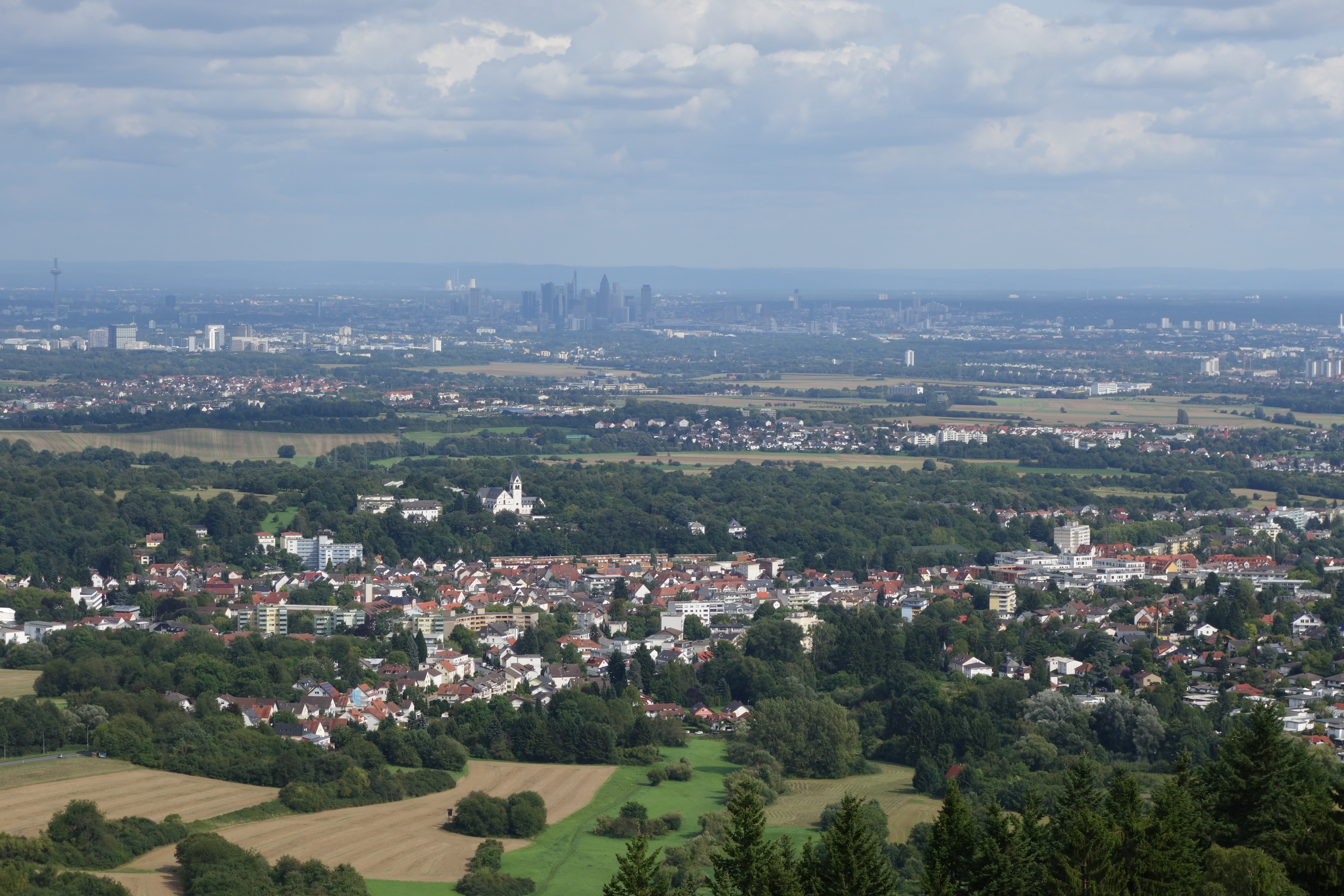
View from Staufen mountain over several towns of the district Main-Taunus-Kreis with Kelkheim in the foreground as well as Liederbach, Bad Soden, Sulzbach and Eschborn in the middleground (Frankfurt in the back)

The state is divided into three administrative provinces (Regierungsbezirke): Kassel in the north and east, Gießen in the centre, and Darmstadt in the south, the latter being the most populous region with the Frankfurt Rhine-Main agglomeration in its central area. The administrative regions have no legislature of their own, but are executive agencies of the state government.

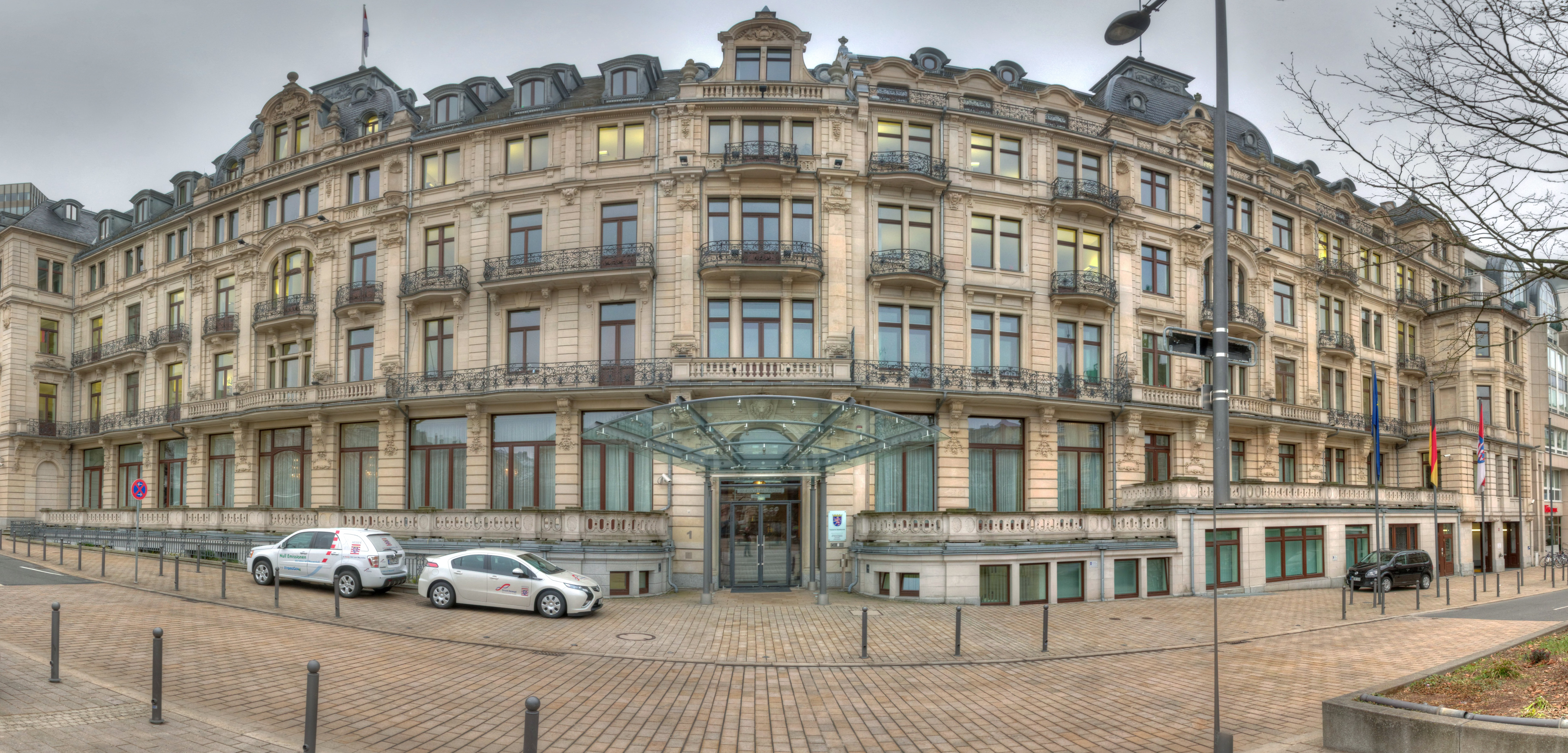
The state chancellery building in the capital city of Wiesbaden

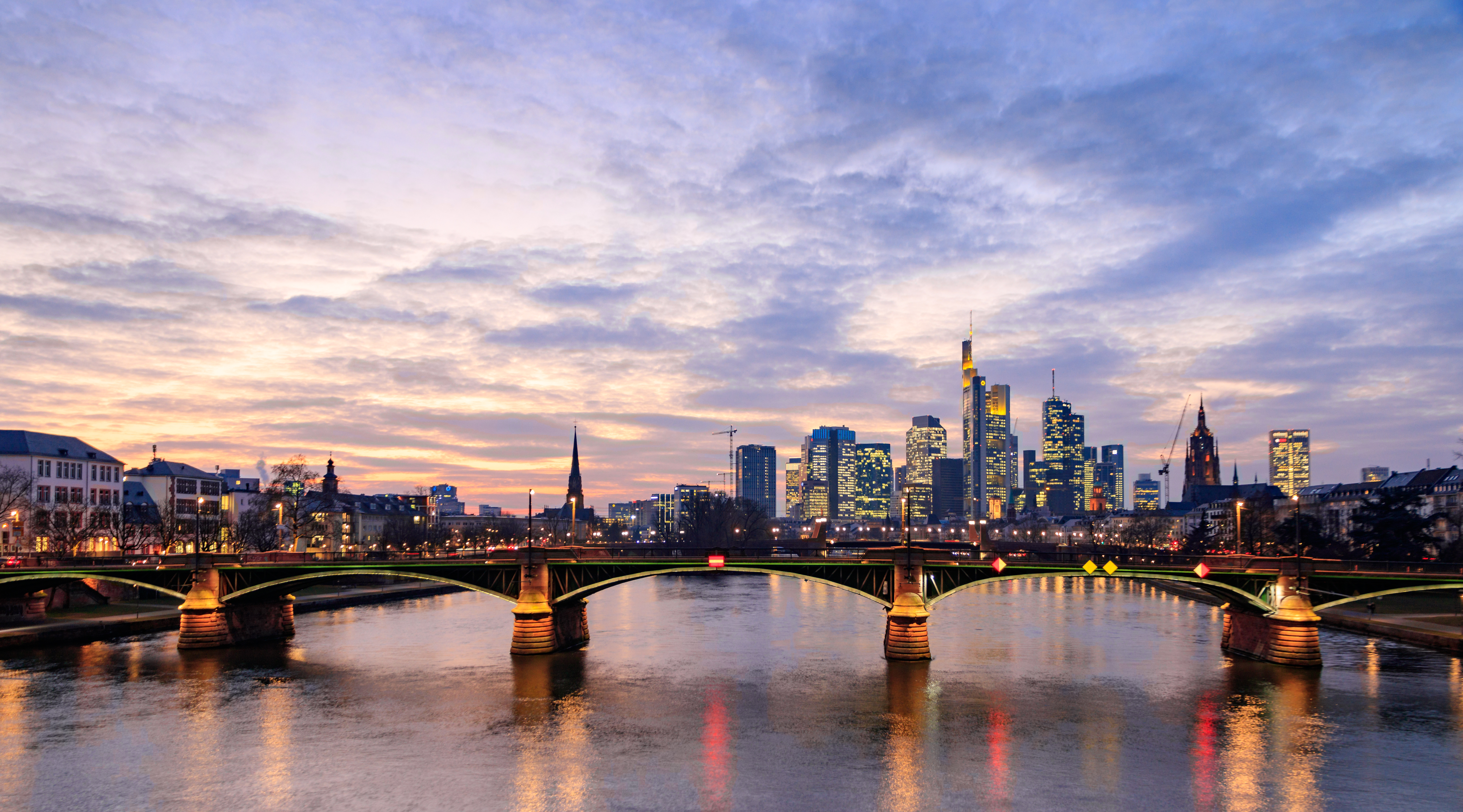
Frankfurt am Main skyline

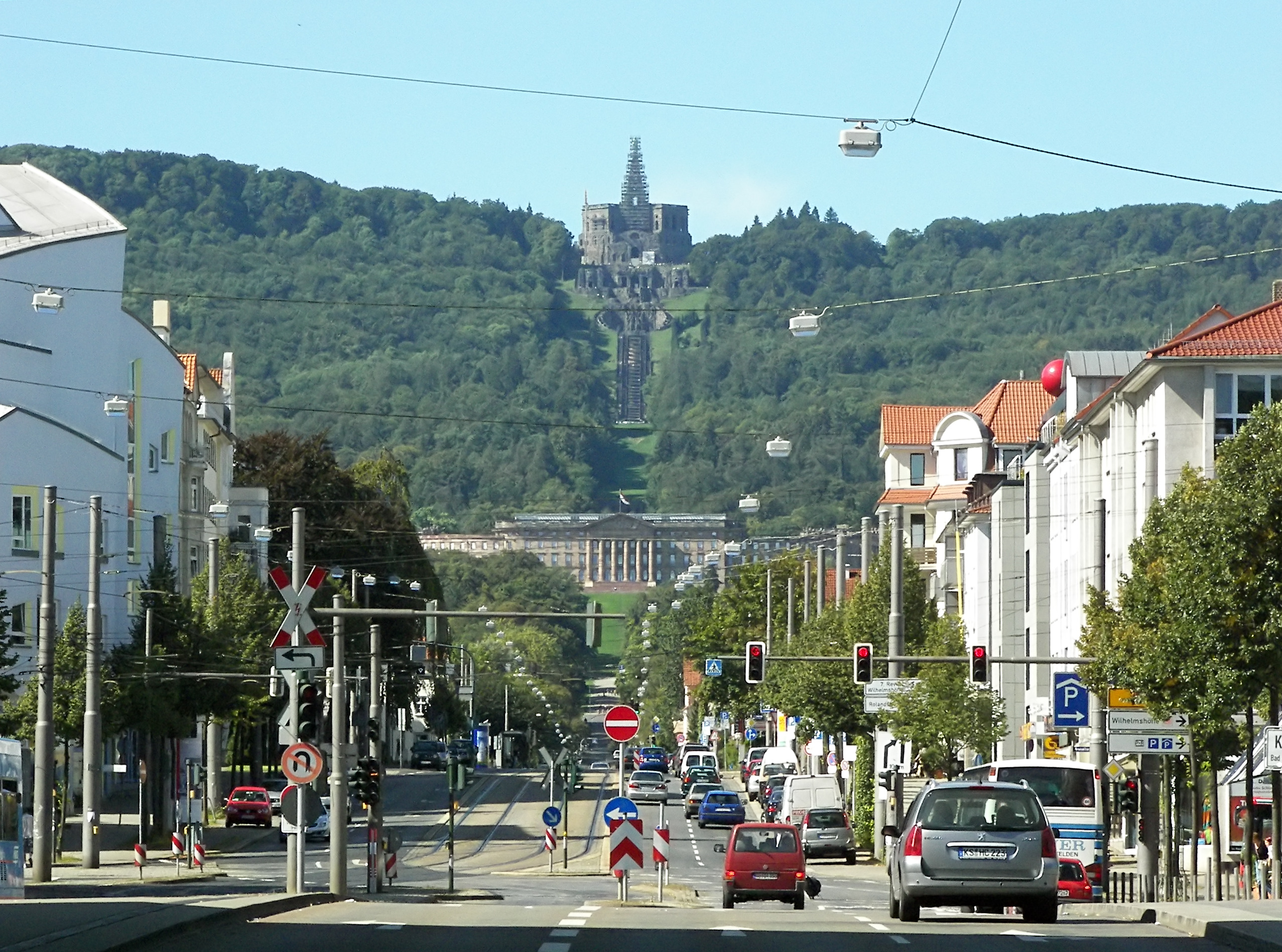
Kassel with Bergpark Wilhelmshöhe

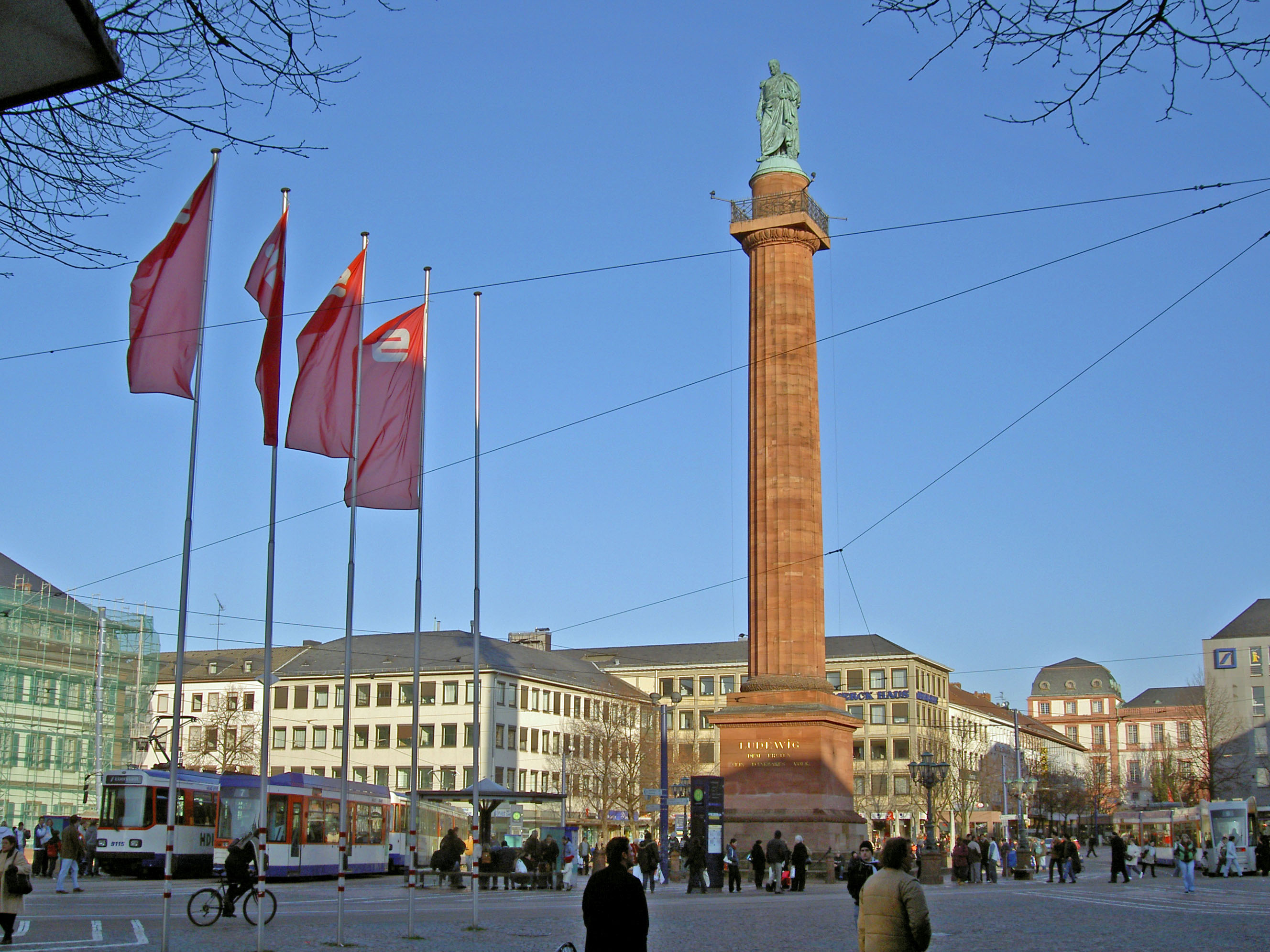
Darmstadt

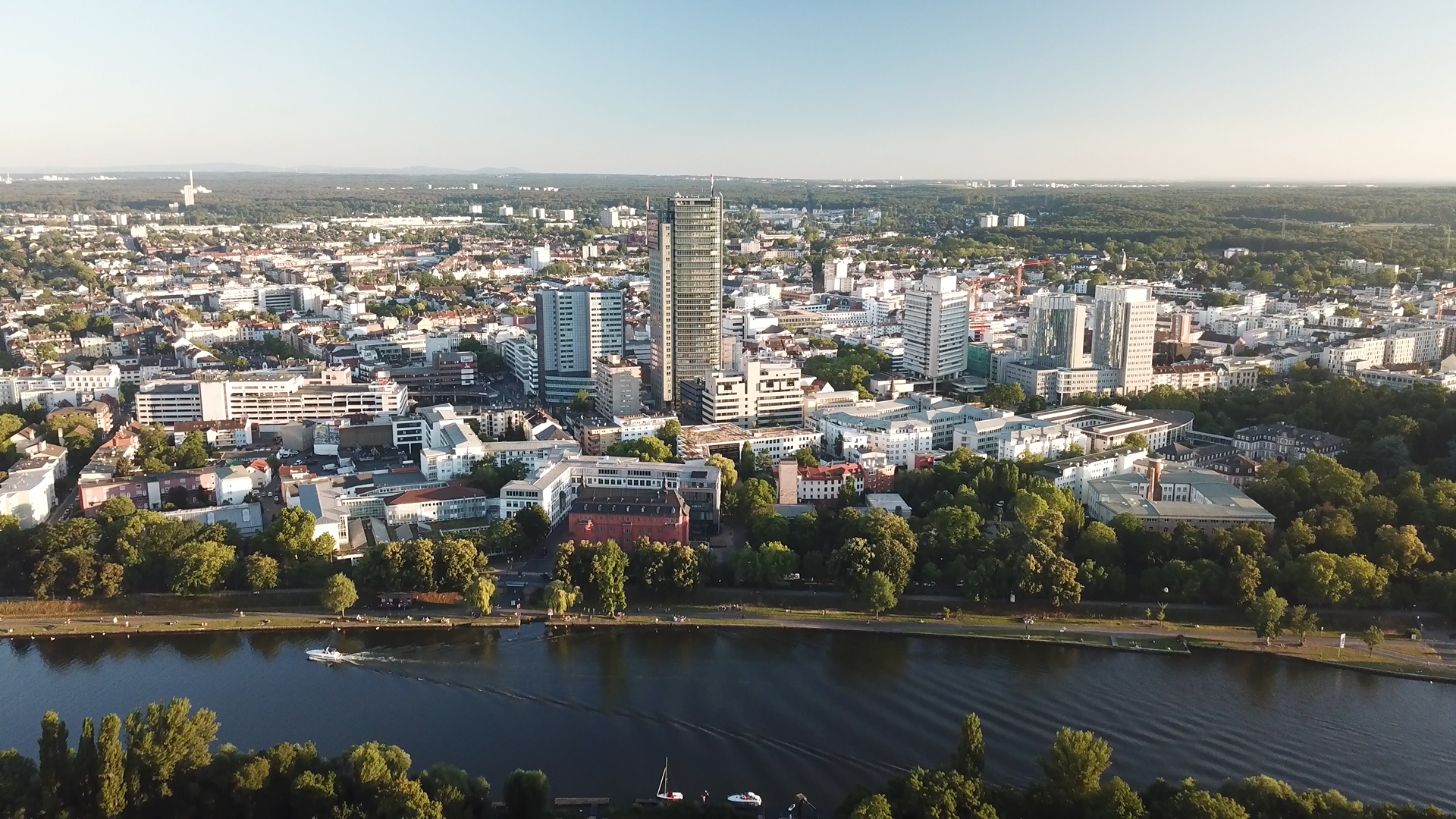
Offenbach am Main

Hesse is divided into 21 districts (Kreise) and six independent cities, each with their own local governments. They are, shown with abbreviations as used on vehicle number plates:

1. Bergstraße (Heppenheim) (HP)
2. Darmstadt-Dieburg (Darmstadt) (DA, DI)
3. Groß-Gerau (Groß-Gerau) (GG)
4. Hochtaunuskreis (Bad Homburg) (HG, USI)
5. Main-Kinzig-Kreis (Gelnhausen) (MKK, GN, HU, SLÜ)
6. Main-Taunus-Kreis (Hofheim am Taunus) (MTK)
7. Odenwaldkreis (Erbach) (ERB)
8. Offenbach (Dietzenbach) (OF)
9. Rheingau-Taunus-Kreis (Bad Schwalbach) (RÜD, SWA)
10. Wetteraukreis (Friedberg) (FB, BÜD)
11. Gießen (Gießen) (GI)
12. Lahn-Dill-Kreis (Wetzlar) (LDK, DIL, WZ)
13. Limburg-Weilburg (Limburg) (LM, WEL)
14. Marburg-Biedenkopf (Marburg) (MR, BID)
15. Vogelsbergkreis (Lauterbach) (VB)
16. Fulda (Fulda) (FD)
17. Hersfeld-Rotenburg (Bad Hersfeld) (HEF, ROF)
18. Kassel (Kassel) (KS, HOG, WOH)
19. Schwalm-Eder-Kreis (Homberg (Efze)) (HR, ZIG, FZ)
20. Werra-Meißner-Kreis (Eschwege) (ESW, WIZ)
21. Waldeck-Frankenberg (Korbach) (KB, FKB, WA)

Independent cities:

1. Darmstadt (DA)
2. Frankfurt am Main (F)
3. Hanau (HU)
4. Kassel (KS)
5. Offenbach am Main (OF)
6. Wiesbaden (WI)

=== Rhenish Hesse ===
The term "Rhenish Hesse" (German: Rheinhessen) refers to the part of the former Grand Duchy of Hesse-Darmstadt located west of the Rhine. It has not been part of the State of Hesse since 1946 due to divisions in the aftermath of World War II. This province is now part of the State of Rhineland-Palatinate. It is a hilly countryside largely devoted to vineyards; therefore, it is also called the "land of the thousand hills". Its larger towns include Mainz, Worms, Bingen, Alzey, Nieder-Olm, and Ingelheim. Many inhabitants commute to work in Mainz, Wiesbaden, or Frankfurt.

== State symbols and politics ==
Hesse has been a parliamentary republic since 1918, except during Nazi rule (1933–1945). The German federal system has elements of exclusive federal competences, shared competences, and exclusive competences of the states. Hesse is famous for having a rather brisk style in its politics with the ruling parties being either the center-right Christian Democratic Union (CDU) or the center-left Social Democratic Party of Germany (SPD). Due to the Hessian electoral laws, the biggest party normally needs a smaller coalition partner.

=== Head of state ===
As Hesse is a partly sovereign federated state, its constitution combines the offices of the head of state and head of government in one office called the Minister-President (German: Ministerpräsident) which is comparable to the office of a prime minister.

=== 2023 election ===
After the 2023 election, the coalition government in Hesse changed from a Christian Democratic Union (CDU) and Alliance 90/The Greens coalition to an agreement between the CDU and Social Democratic Party.

Summary of the 8 October 2023 election results for the Landtag of Hesse
Party	Seats	+/-
Christian Democratic Union	52	▲12
Alternative for Germany	28	▲9
Social Democratic Party	23	▼6
Alliance 90/The Greens	22	▼7
Total	133	▼4

=== 2018 election ===
The Hessian parliament as of the 2018 election

In the 2018 state elections the two leading parties, CDU and SPD, lost 11.3% (7 seats) and 10.9% (8 seats) of the vote respectively. The Green party, a member of Hesse's previous governing coalition with CDU, gained 8.7% (16 seats). The largest gains during the election were made by Alternative for Germany (AfD) at 13.1%. As AfD had not passed the 5% threshold in the 2013 state election, this marked its first entry into the Hessian parliament (Hessischer Landtag). The two other parties also made gains. The major losses of the two leading parties (whose coalition made up the federal cabinet during the election) closely mirrors the results of the 2018 state elections in Bavaria. In the 2018-2023 parliament, the conservative CDU held 40 seats, the centre-left SPD and the leftist Green party each held 29 seats, the right-wing AfD held 19 seats, the liberal FDP party held 11 seats and the socialist party The Left held 9 seats.

=== Foreign affairs ===
As a member state of the German federation, Hesse does not have a diplomatic service of its own. However, Hesse operates representation offices in such foreign countries as the United States, China, Hungary, Cuba, Russia, Poland, and Iran. These offices are mostly used to represent Hessian interests in cultural and economic affairs. Hesse has also permanent representation offices in Berlin at the federal government of Germany and in Brussels at the institutions of the European Union.

=== Flag and anthem ===
The flag colors of Hesse are red and white, which are printed on a Hessian sack. The civil flag of Hesse resembles that of Monaco's and, particularly, Indonesia's. The Hessian coat of arms shows a lion rampant striped with red and white (silver), on a blue field. The official anthem of Hesse is called "Hessenlied" ("Song of Hesse") and was written by Albrecht Brede (music) and Carl Preser (lyrics).

== Demographics ==
Historical population
Year	Pop.	±% p.a.
1950	4,343,720	—
1955	4,577,198	+1.05%
1960	4,783,352	+0.88%
1965	5,170,449	+1.57%
1970	5,424,529	+0.96%
1975	5,549,823	+0.46%
1980	5,601,031	+0.18%
1985	5,529,413	−0.26%
1990	5,763,310	+0.83%
1995	6,009,913	+0.84%
2001	6,077,826	+0.19%
2011	5,971,816	−0.18%
2022	6,207,278	+0.35%

Significant foreign resident populations
Nationality	Population (31 December)	
Nationality	2022	2023
Turkey	160,250	166,885
Ukraine	88,075	95,915
Romania	82,025	83,510
Poland	83,760	79,530
Italy	76,155	73,990
Syria	60,365	62,655
Afghanistan	49,650	62,260
Croatia	58,640	56,220
Bulgaria	53,300	55,690
Greece	40,655	36,285
Serbia	32,865	33,835
Spain	29,340	29,465
India	24,415	27,910
Bosnia and Herzegovina	25,645	26,665
Russia	20,470	22,115
Morocco	21,830	21,255
Pakistan	18,725	19,925
Eritrea	19,695	18,685

Hesse has a population of over 6 million, nearly 4 million of which is concentrated in the Rhein-Main region (German: Rhein-Main Gebiet) in the south of the state, an area that includes the most populous city, Frankfurt am Main, the capital Wiesbaden, and Darmstadt and Offenbach. The population of Hesse is predicted to shrink by 4.3% by 2030, with the biggest falls in the north of the state, especially in the area around the city of Kassel. Frankfurt is the fastest growing city with a predicted rise in population of 4.8% by 2030. Frankfurt's growth is driven by its importance as a financial centre and it receives immigrants from all over the world: in 2015 over half of the city's population had a migration background.

=== Vital statistics ===
- Births January–March 2017 = ▲14,537
- Births January–March 2018 = ▼14,202
- Deaths January–March 2017 = ▲19,289
- Deaths January–March 2018 = ▼18,831
- Natural growth January–March 2017 = ▼ −4,752
- Natural growth January–March 2018 = ▲ −4,629

=== Language ===
Three different languages or dialect groups are spoken in Hesse: The far north is part of the Low Saxon language area, divided into a tiny Eastphalian and a larger Westphalian dialect area. Most of Hesse belongs to the West Middle German dialect zone. There is some disagreement as to whether all Hessian dialects south of the Benrath line may be subsumed under one dialect group, Rhine Franconian; or whether most dialects should be regarded as a dialect group of its own: Hessian, whereas only South Hessian is part of Rhine Franconian. Hessian proper can be split into Lower Hessian in the north, East Hessian in the East around Fulda and Central Hessian, which covers the largest area of all dialects in Hesse. In the extreme northeast, the Thuringian dialect zone extends into Hesse, whereas in the southeast, the state border with Bavaria is not fully identical to the dialect border between East Franconian and East Hessian.

Since around the time of World War II, a spoken variety of Standard German with dialect substrate has been superseding the traditional dialects mentioned above. This development has been faster in the north than in the south: the north was early to supplant the traditional language, whereas in the south, there is still a considerable part of the population that communicates in South Hessian. In most of the areas, however, the traditional language is close to extinction, whereas until the first half of the 20th century, almost the entire population spoke dialect in almost all situations. The upper class started to speak Standard German beginning in the late 19th century, so for decades, the traditional language served as a sociolect.

The prominent written language in Hesse has been Standard German since the 16th century. Before then, the Low Saxon part used Middle Low German, the rest of the Land Early Modern German as prominent written languages. These had supplanted Latin in the High Middle Ages.

=== Religion ===
Religion in Hesse – 2025
Religion	Percent
None or other	55.3%
EKD Protestants	26.9%
Roman Catholics	17.8%

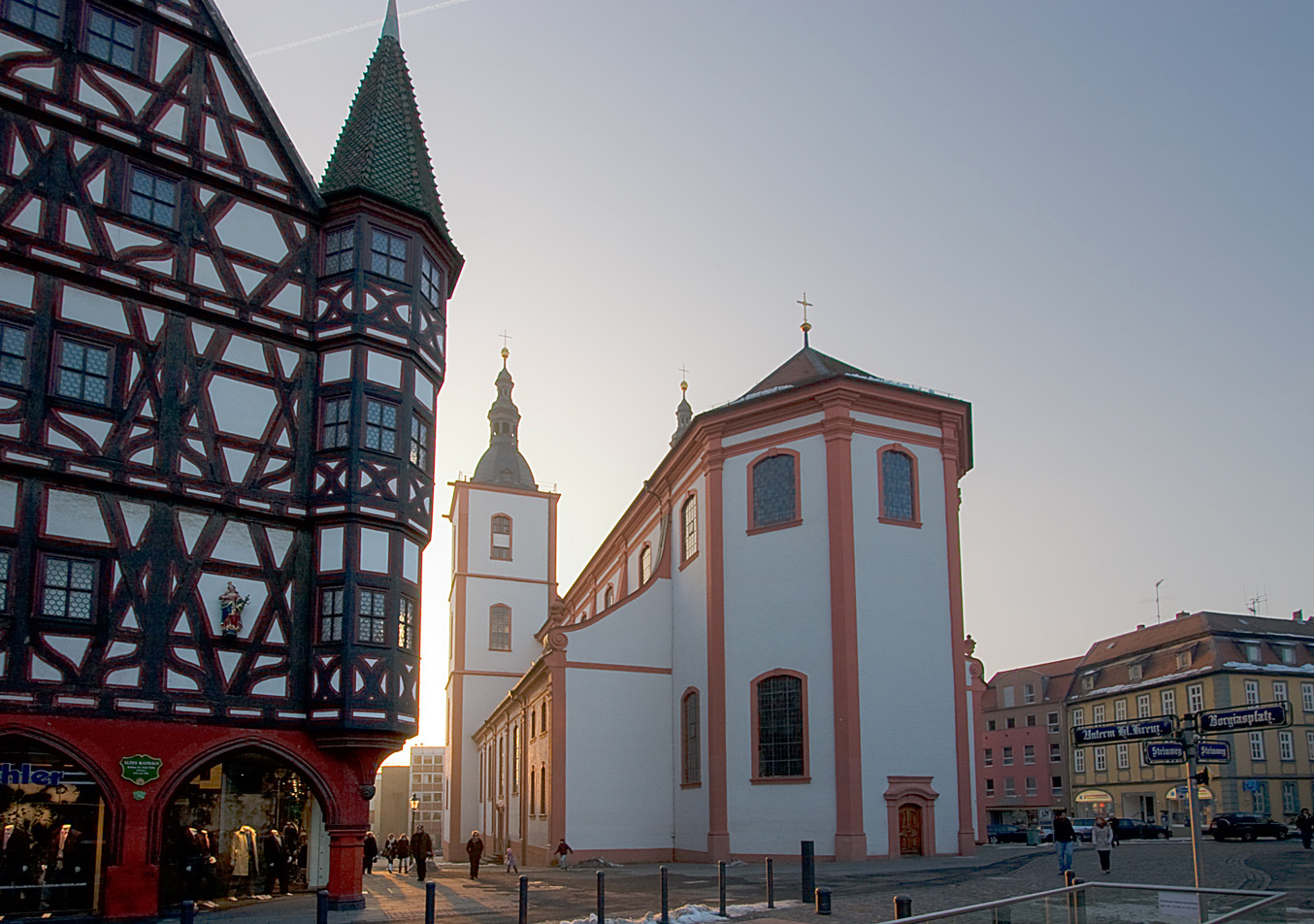
View of the Stadtpfarrkirche St. Blasius in Fulda

In 2025, 55.3% of the population was not religious or adhered to religions other than the Evangelical Church or Catholicism. 26.9% of the population belonged to the Protestant Church in Germany, the largest religious body, and 17.8% to the Roman Catholic Church.

In 2016 Christianity was the most widespread religion in the state (63%). In 2011, 40% of Hessians belonged to the Protestant Church in Hesse and Nassau or Evangelical Church of Hesse Electorate-Waldeck (members of the Protestant Church in Germany), 25% adhered to the Roman Catholic Church, while other Christians constituted some 3%; the next most common religion of the Hessian population was Islam, adhered to by 7%.

In a 2011 study of the region, German sociologist of religion and theologian Michael N. Ebertz and German television presenter and author Meinhard Schmidt-Degenhard concluded that "Six religious orientation types can be distinguished: 'Christians'—'non-Christian theists'—'Cosmotheists'—'Deists, Pandeists and Polytheists'—'Atheists'—'Others'".

== Education and research ==
=== Higher education ===
The Hessian government has overall responsibility for the education within the state. Hesse has the following universities:

- Goethe University Frankfurt (43,972 students; Budget: €666,4 Mio.)
- Technical University of Darmstadt (25,355 students; Budget: €482,8 Mio.)
- Justus Liebig University Giessen (28,480 students; Budget: €425,4 Mio.)
- Philipps University of Marburg (24,394 students; Budget: €374,3 Mio.)
- University of Kassel (25,103 students; Budget: €291,5 Mio.)

None of Hesse's universities are included in German Excellence Universities.

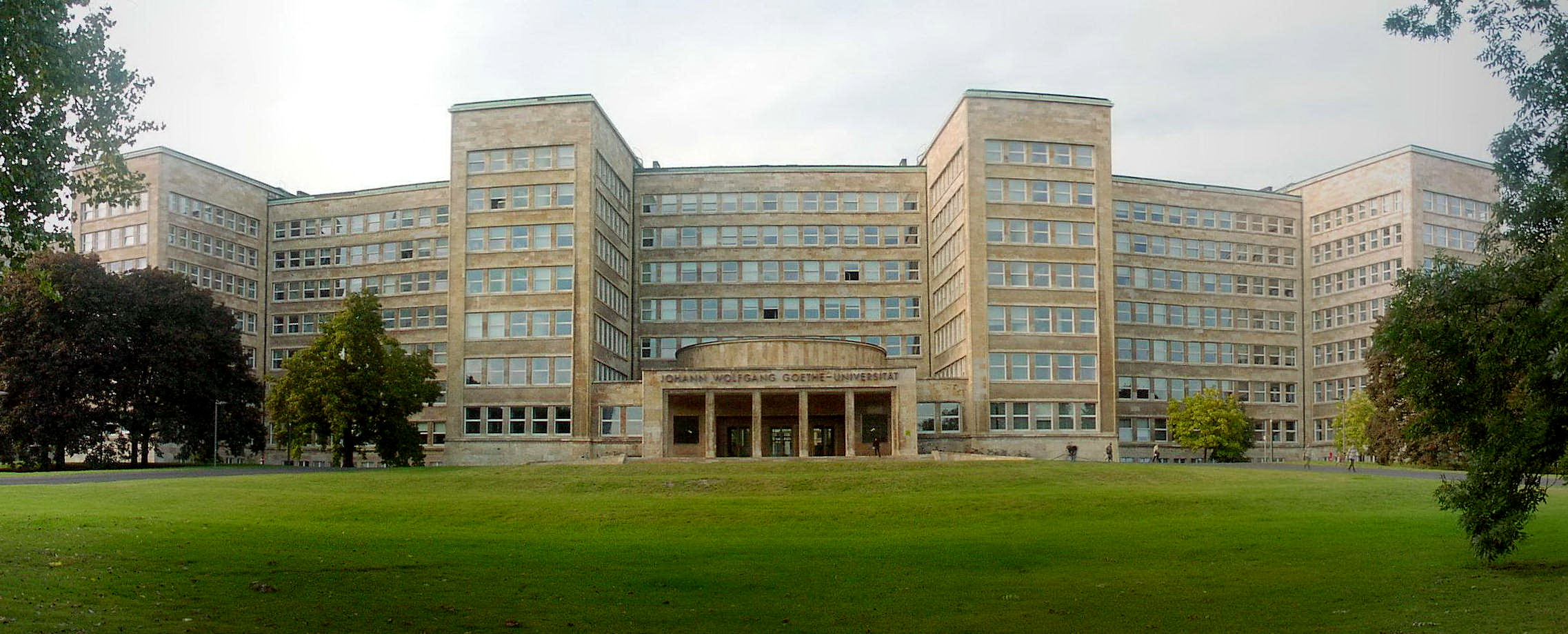
Goethe University Frankfurt, Campus Westend

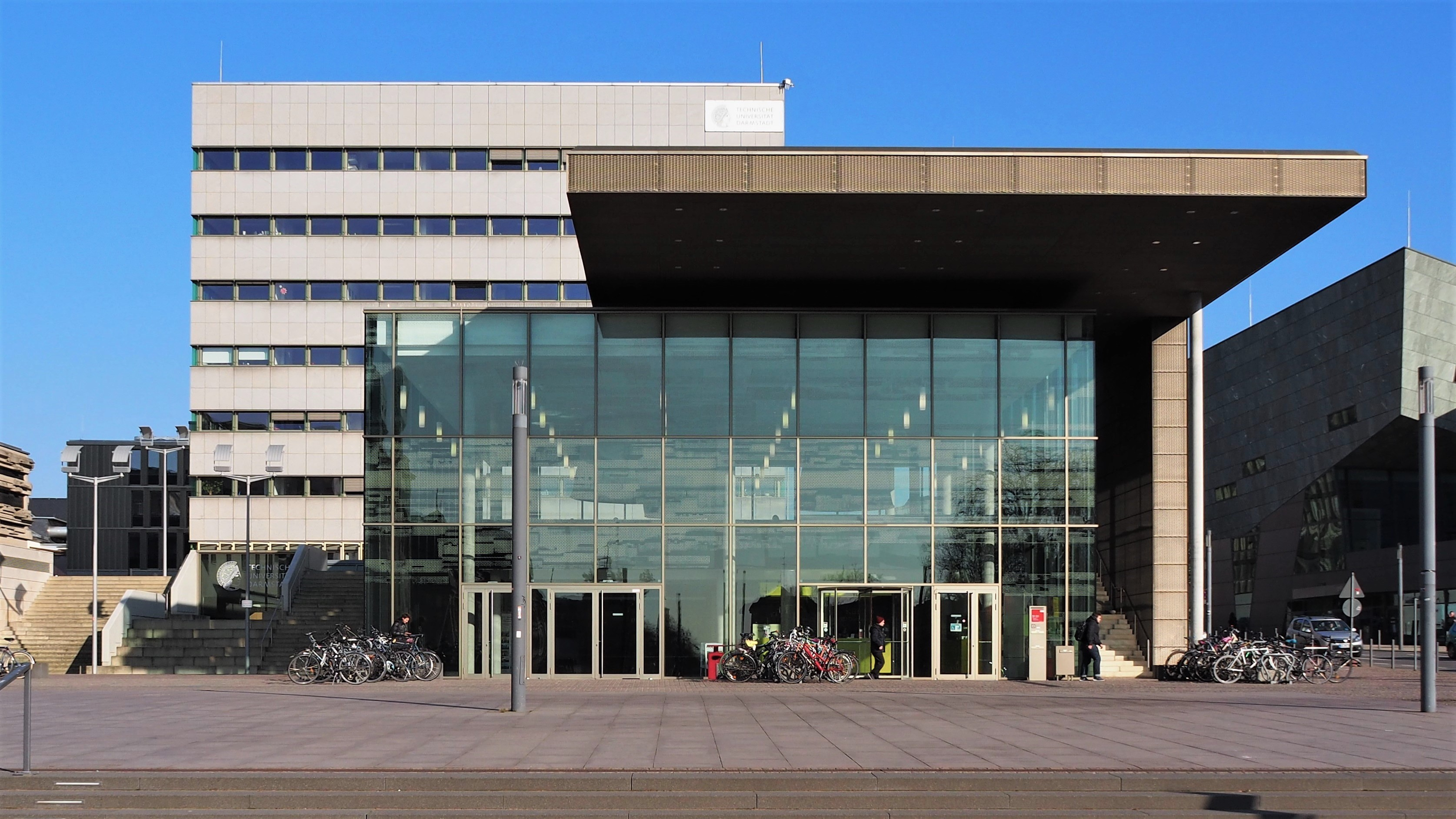
Technical University of Darmstadt, Main Entrance

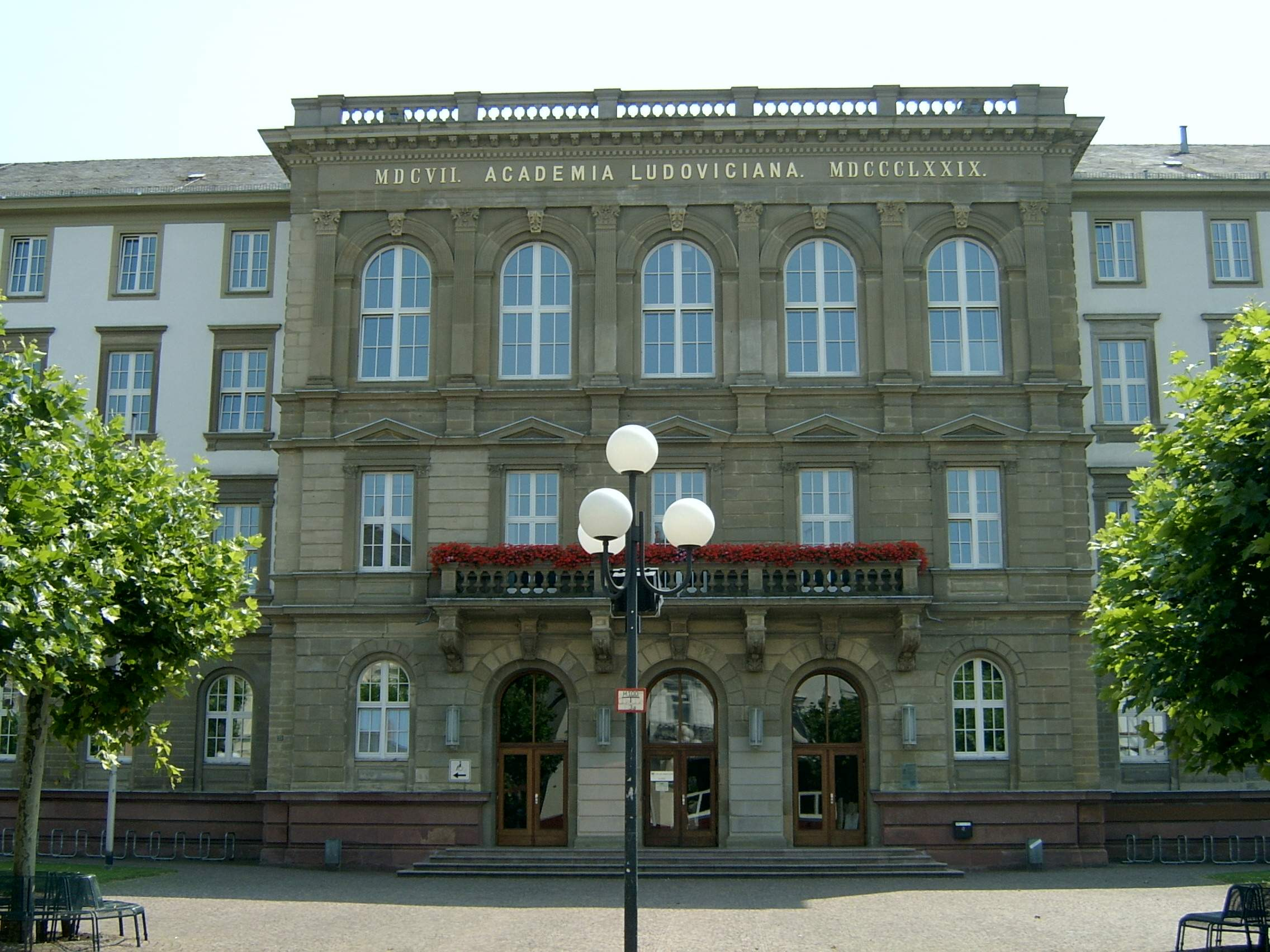
Justus Liebig University Giessen

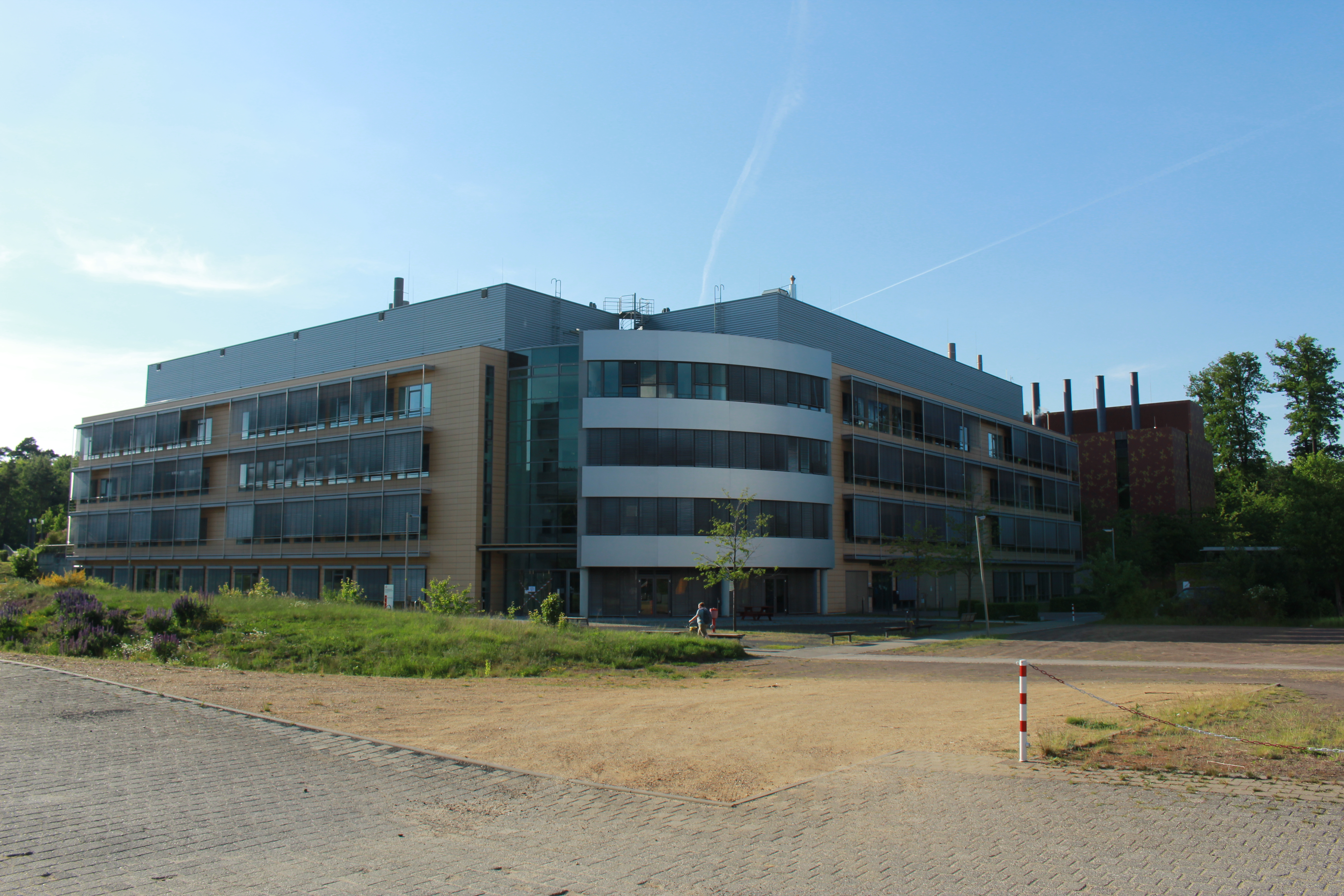
Philipps University of Marburg, Biomedical Research Center

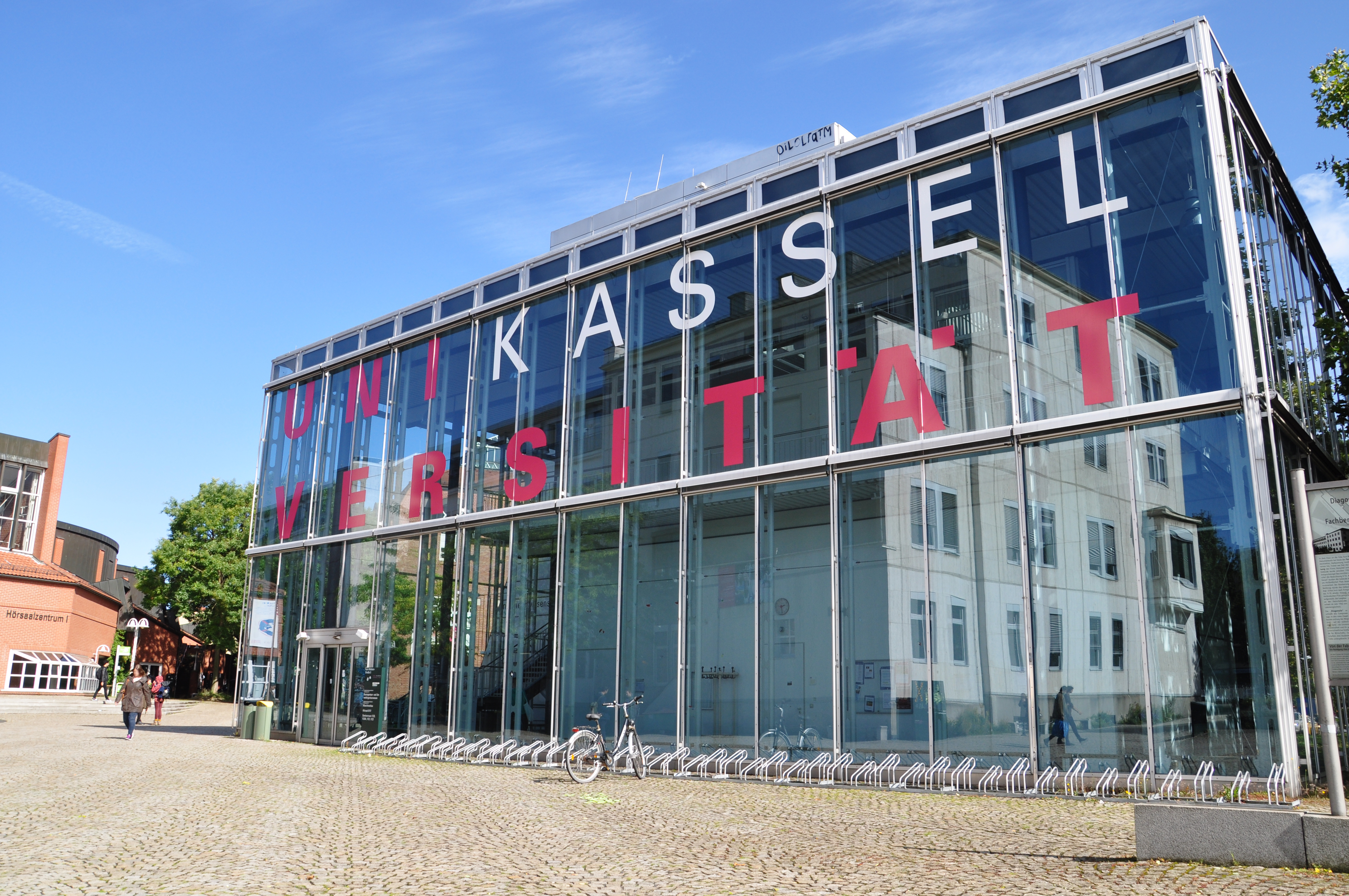
University of Kassel, Entrance Holländischer Platz

There are many international schools in Hesse, primarily centred in and around Frankfurt.

Hesse is the only state in Germany where students have to study all three stanzas of the "Das Deutschlandlied".

=== Research ===
==== Physics and astronomy ====
The GSI Helmholtz Centre for Heavy Ion Research in Darmstadt-Wixhausen, with 1,520 employees, is a major research institute in Hesse. The Facility for Antiproton and Ion Research is under construction and is expected to be completed in 2025.

Two major European space organizations, the European Space Operations Center and the European Organisation for the Exploitation of Meteorological Satellites, are based in Darmstadt.

==== Health and medicine ====
- Max Planck Institute for Heart and Lung Research, Bad Nauheim
- Max Planck Institute for Brain Research, Frankfurt-am-Main
- Max Planck Institute of Biophysics, Frankfurt-am-Main
- Max Planck Research Center for Neurogenetics, Frankfurt-am-Main
- Fraunhofer Institute for Translational Medicine and Pharmacology, Frankfurt-am-Main
- Paul Ehrlich Institute (vaccines), Langen
- Max Planck Institute for Terrestrial Microbiology, Marburg
- Institute of Virology (Marburg)(research of Ebolavirus and Marburgvirus; Parasitology) with BSL4-Labor, Marburg
- Center for undiagnosed and rare diseases, Marburg
- Marburg Heavy Ion Beam Therapy Center, Marburg
- Sigmund Freud Institute (psychoanalysis), Frankfurt-am-Main

==== Informatics and software ====
- German Research Centre for Artificial Intelligence, Darmstadt
- Hessian Center for Artificial Intelligence (hessian.AI), HQ in Darmstadt, more locations in Hesse
- Athene (research center), Darmstadt
- Center for Advanced Security Research Darmstadt, Darmstadt
- Fraunhofer Institute for Secure Information Technology, Darmstadt
- Fraunhofer Institute for Graphic Data Processing, Darmstadt

==== Others ====
- Fraunhofer Institute for Structural Durability and System Reliability, Darmstadt
- Fraunhofer Institute for Energy Economics and Energy System Technology, HQ in Kassel, other location in Rothwesten and Bad Hersfeld
- Fraunhofer Facility for Material Cycles and Resource Strategy, Hanau
- Max-Planck-Institut für europäische Rechtsgeschichte, Frankfurt-am-Main
- Institut für Sozialforschung at Johann Wolfgang Goethe-Universität Frankfurt-am-Main
- Leibniz-Institut für Bildungsforschung und Bildungsinformation, Frankfurt-am-Main
- Forschungsinstitut für Deutsche Sprache – Deutscher Sprachatlas – at Philipps-Universität Marburg
- Paul-Ehrlich-Institut, * Forschungsinstitut und Naturmuseum Senckenberg, Frankfurt am Main
- Peace Research Institute Frankfurt, Frankfurt-am-Main
- Institut für sozial-ökologische Forschung, Frankfurt-am-Main

== Culture ==
Hesse has a rich and varied cultural history, with many important cultural and historical centres and several UNESCO world-heritage sites.

=== Architecture, art, literature and music ===
Darmstadt has a rich cultural heritage as the former seat of the Landgraves and Grand Dukes of Hesse. It is known as centre of the Art Nouveau Jugendstil and modern architecture and there are also several important examples of 19th century architecture influenced by British and Russian imperial architecture due to close family ties of the Grand Duke's family to the reigning dynasties in London and Saint Petersburg in the Grand Duchy period. Darmstadt is an important centre for music, home of the Darmstädter Ferienkurse for contemporary classical music and the Jazz Institute Darmstadt, Europe's largest public jazz archive.

Frankfurt am Main is a major international cultural centre. Over 2 million people visit the city's approximately 60 exhibition centres every year. Amongst its most famous art galleries are the Schirn Kunsthalle, a major centre for international modern art, and the Städel, whose large collections include over 3000 paintings, 4000 photographs, and 100,000 drawings including works by Picasso, Monet, Rembrandt and Dürer. Goethe was born in Frankfurt and there is a museum in his birthplace. Frankfurt has many music venues, including an award-winning opera house, the Alte Oper, and the Jahrhunderthalle. Its several theatres include the English Theatre, the largest English-speaking theatre on the European continent.

Kassel has many palaces and parks, including Bergpark Wilhelmshöhe, a Baroque landscape park and UNESCO World Heritage site. The Brothers Grimm lived and worked in Kassel for 30 years and the recently opened Grimmwelt museum explores their lives, works and influence and features their personal copies of the Children's and Household Tales, which are on the UNESCO World Heritage "Memory of the World" Document register. The Fridericianum, built in 1779, is one of the oldest public museums in Europe. Kassel is also home to the documenta, a large modern art exhibition that has taken place every five years since the 1950s.

The Hessian Ministry of the Arts supports numerous independent cultural initiatives, organisations, and associations as well as artists from many fields including music, literature, theatre and dance, cinema and the new media, graphic art, and exhibitions. International cultural projects aim to further relations with European partners.

From an archaeological point of view, the old watercourses of Hesse provide evidence of the wider history of the landscape and their protection has required cooperation.

=== UNESCO World Heritage Sites ===
Hesse has several UNESCO World Heritage sites. These include:

- Bergpark Wilhelmshöhe in Kassel
- Kellerwald-Edersee National Park in North Hesse
- Lorsch Abbey
- The Messel Fossil Pit. Exhibits from the Messel Pit can be seen in Messel town museum, the Museum of Hessen in Darmstadt, and the Senckenberg Museum in Frankfurt.
- The Saalburg, part of the Roman Limes.
- Darmstadt Artists' Colony

=== Sports ===
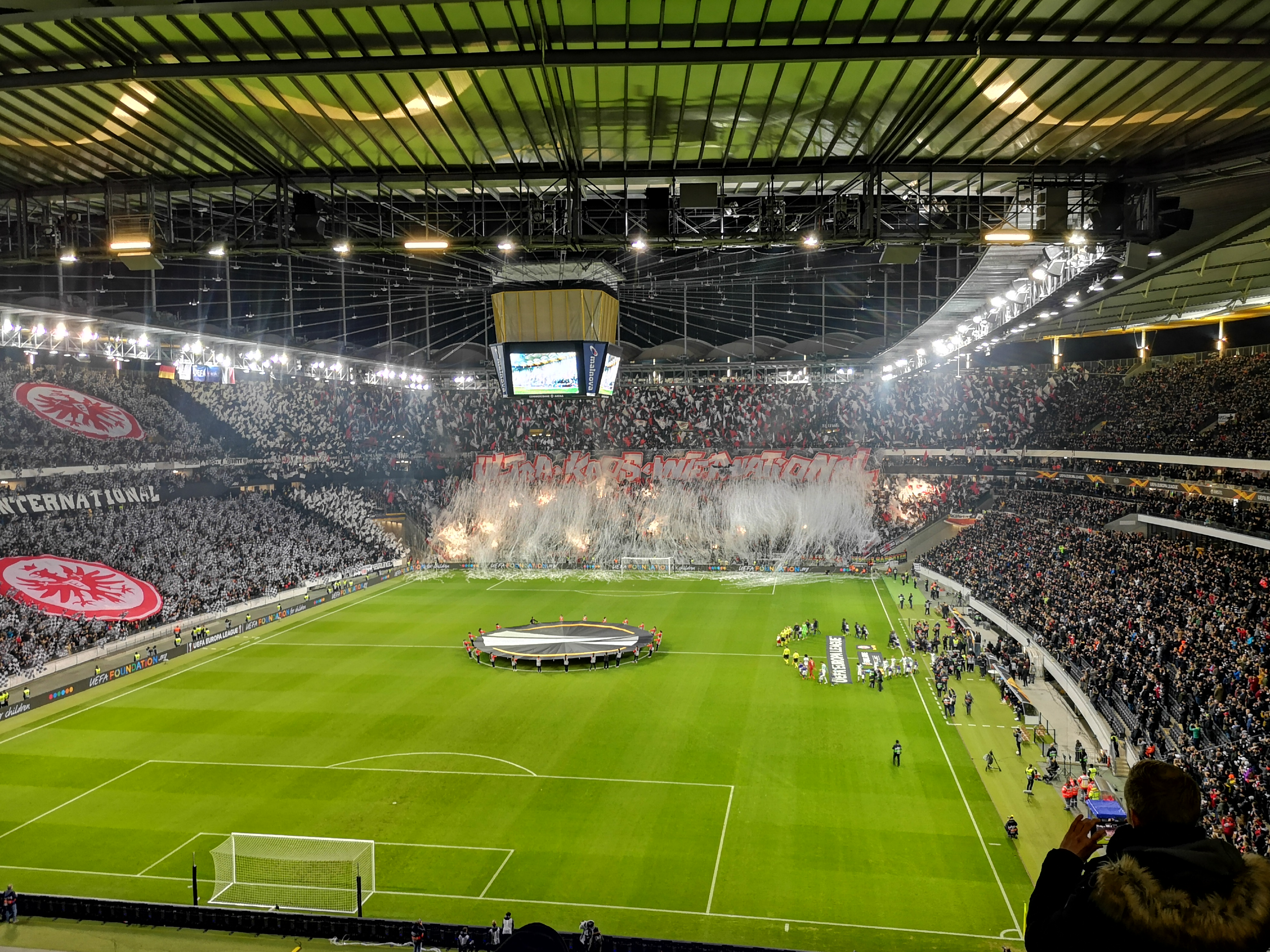
Deutsche Bank Park (football stadium) in Frankfurt

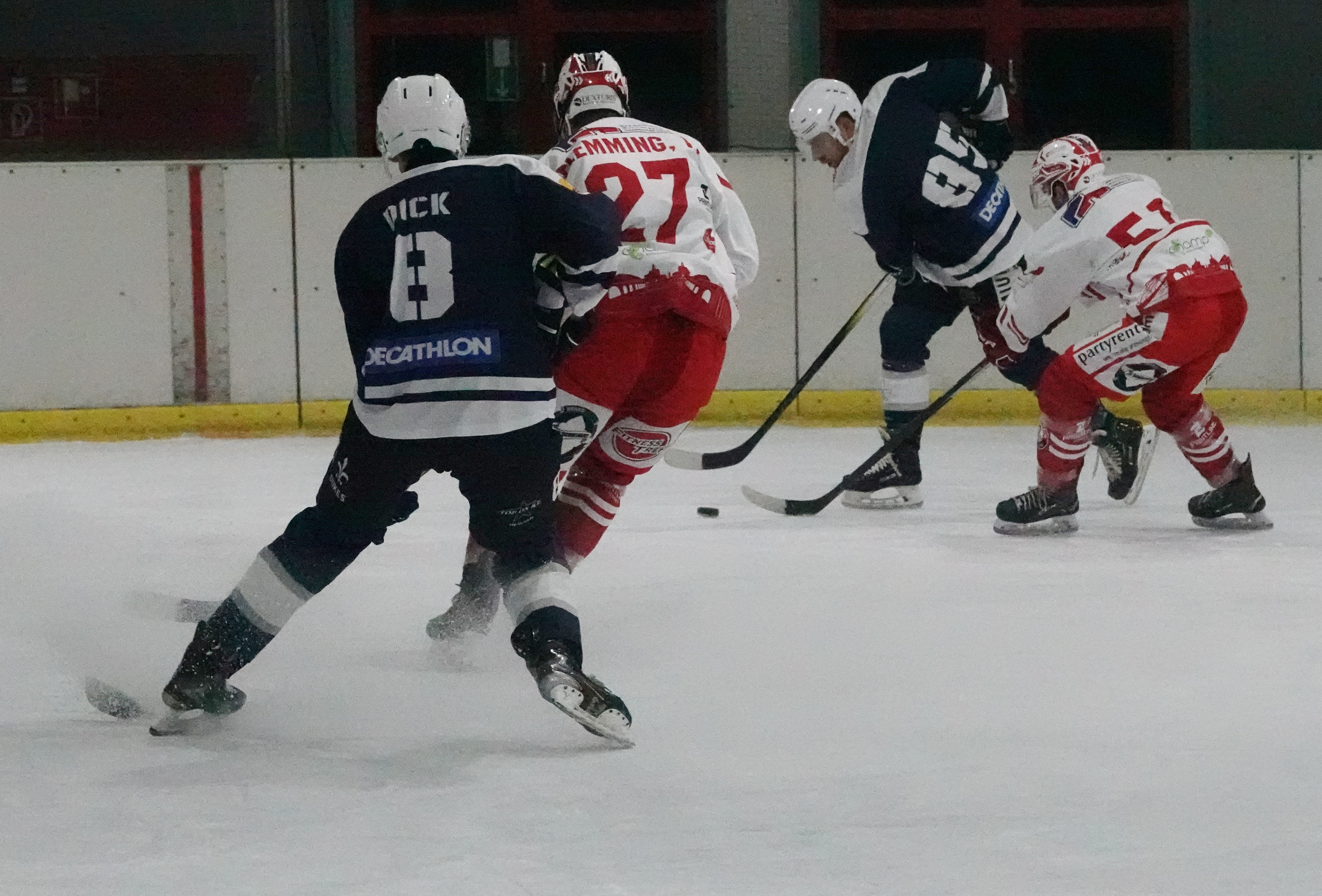
Hockey match Darmstadt Dukes VS RT Bad Nauheim

Frankfurt hosts the following professional sports teams or clubs:

- 1. FFC Frankfurt (1998–2020), football (women)
- Eintracht Frankfurt, football (men, women)
- FSV Frankfurt, football (men)
- Rot-Weiss Frankfurt, football
- Frankfurter FC Germania 1894, football
- Skyliners Frankfurt, basketball
- Frankfurt Galaxy (1991–2007), American football
- Frankfurt Universe (2007–present), American football
- Frankfurter Löwen (1979–1984), American football
- Frankfurt Sarsfields GAA, Gaelic football
- Frankfurt Lions (until 2010), ice hockey
- Löwen Frankfurt (since 2010), ice hockey
- SC 1880 Frankfurt, rugby union

Frankfurt is host to the classic cycle race Eschborn-Frankfurt City Loop (known as Rund um den Henninger-Turm from 1961 to 2008). The city hosts also the annual Frankfurt Marathon and the Ironman Germany.

Outside Frankfurt, notable professional sports teams include Wehen Wiesbaden, Kickers Offenbach, SV Darmstadt 98, Marburg Mercenaries, Gießen 46ers, MT Melsungen, VfB Friedberg, and the Kassel Huskies.

=== TV and radio stations ===
The Hessian state broadcasting corporation is called HR (Hessischer Rundfunk). HR is a member of the federal ARD broadcasting association. HR provides a statewide TV channel as well as a range of regional radio stations (HR 1, HR 2, HR 3, HR 4, you fm and HR info). Besides the state run HR, privately run TV stations exist and are an important line of commerce. Among the commercial radio stations that are active in Hesse, Hit Radio FFH, Planet Radio, Harmony FM, Radio BOB and Antenne Frankfurt are the most popular.

== Economy ==
=== Financial ===
With Hesse's largest city Frankfurt am Main being home of the European Central Bank (ECB), the German Bundesbank and the Frankfurt Stock Exchange, Hesse is home to the financial capital of mainland Europe. Furthermore, Hesse has always been one of the largest and healthiest economies in Germany. Its GDP in 2013 exceeded €236 billion (about US$316 billion). This makes Hesse itself one of the largest economies in Europe and the 38th largest in the world. According to GDP-per-capita figures, Hesse is the wealthiest state (after the city-states Hamburg and Bremen) in Germany with approx. US$52,500.

Frankfurt is crucial as a financial center, with both the European Central Bank and the Deutsche Bundesbank's headquarters located there. Numerous smaller banks and Deutsche Bank, DZ Bank, KfW Bank, Commerzbank are also headquartered in Frankfurt, with the offices of several international banks also being housed there. Frankfurt is also the location of the most important German stock exchange, the Frankfurt Stock Exchange. Insurance companies have settled mostly in Wiesbaden. The city's largest private employer is the R+V Versicherung, with about 3,900 employees, other major employers are DBV-Winterthur, the SV SparkassenVersicherung and the Delta Lloyd Group.

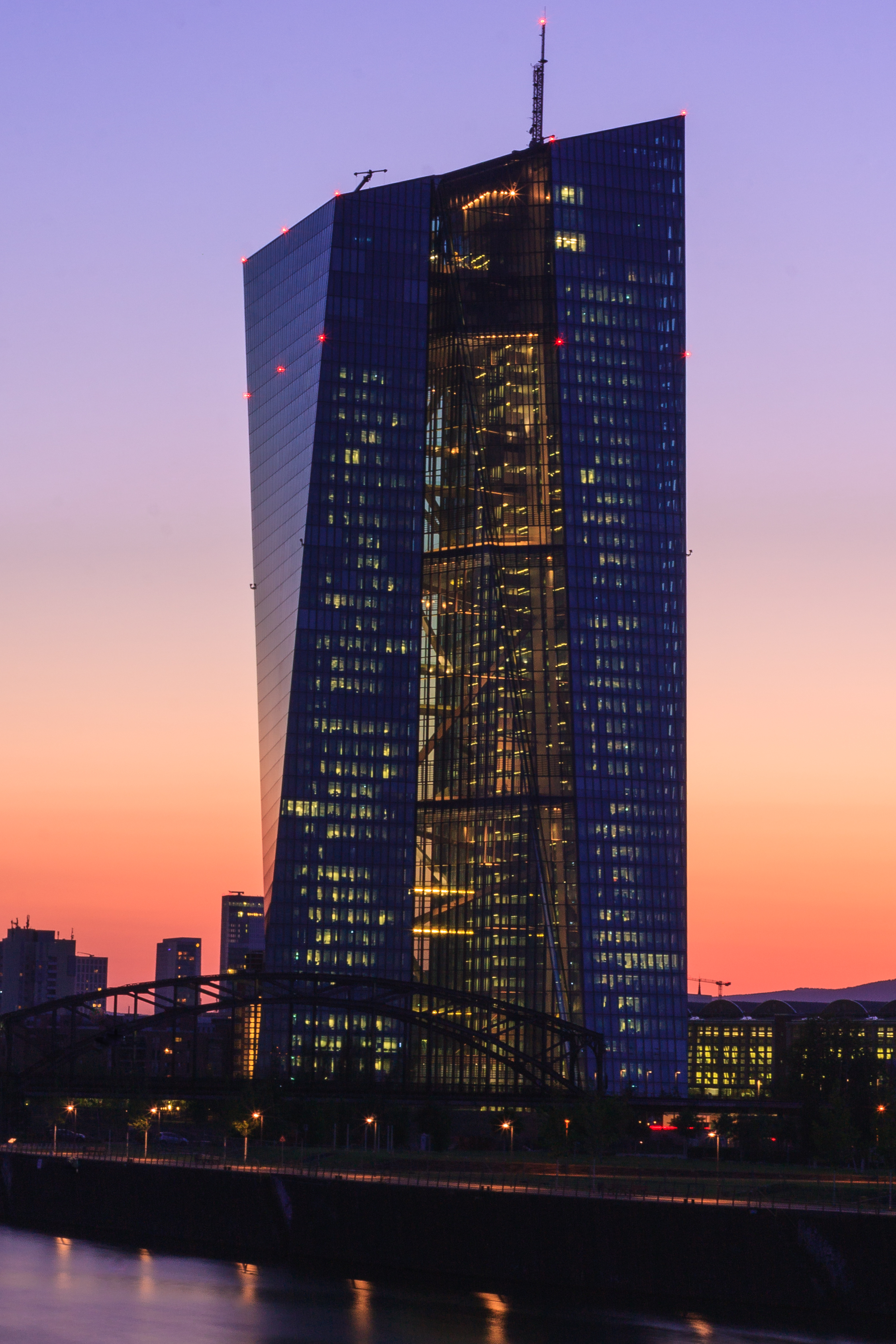
European Central Bank

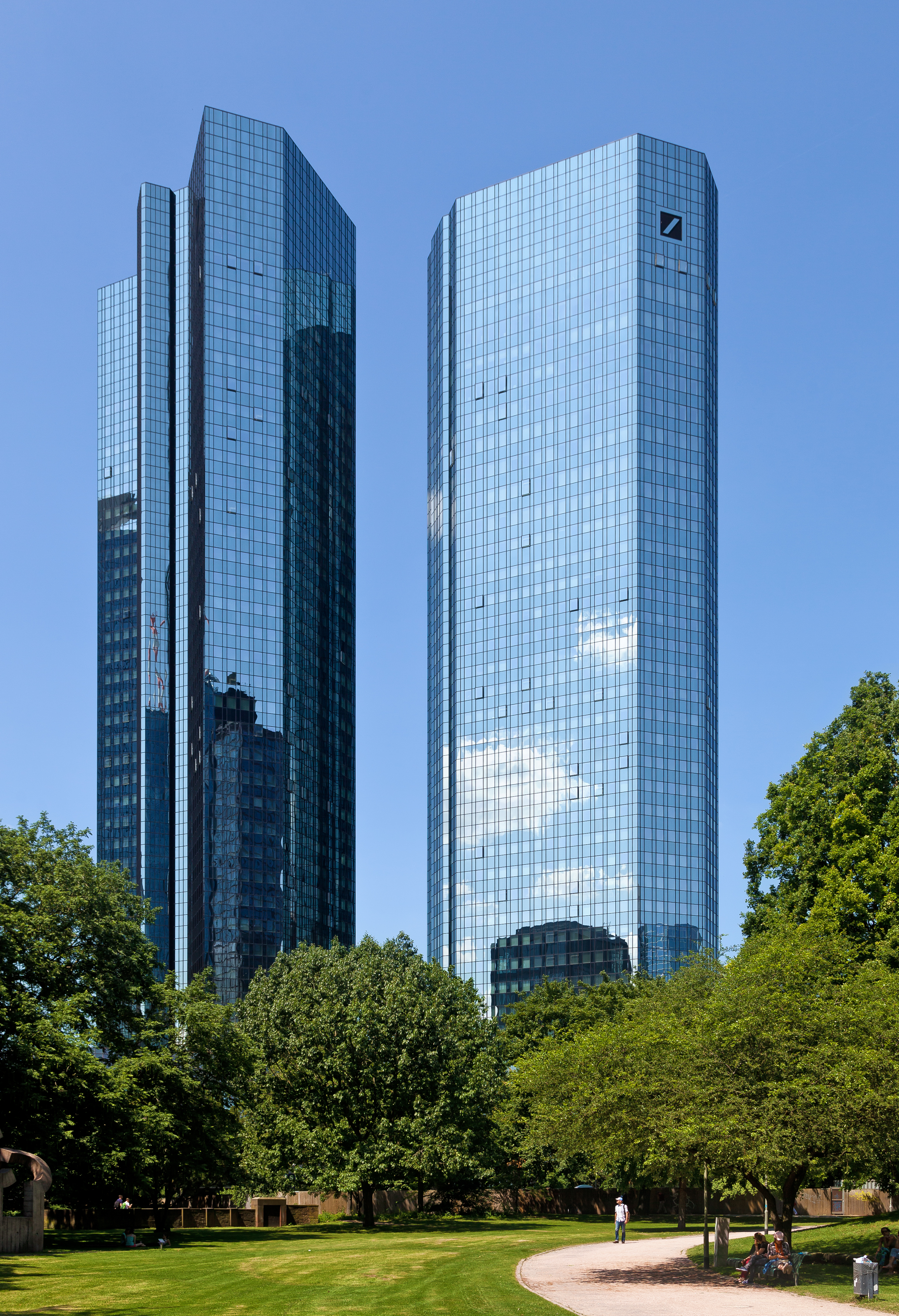
Deutsche Bank

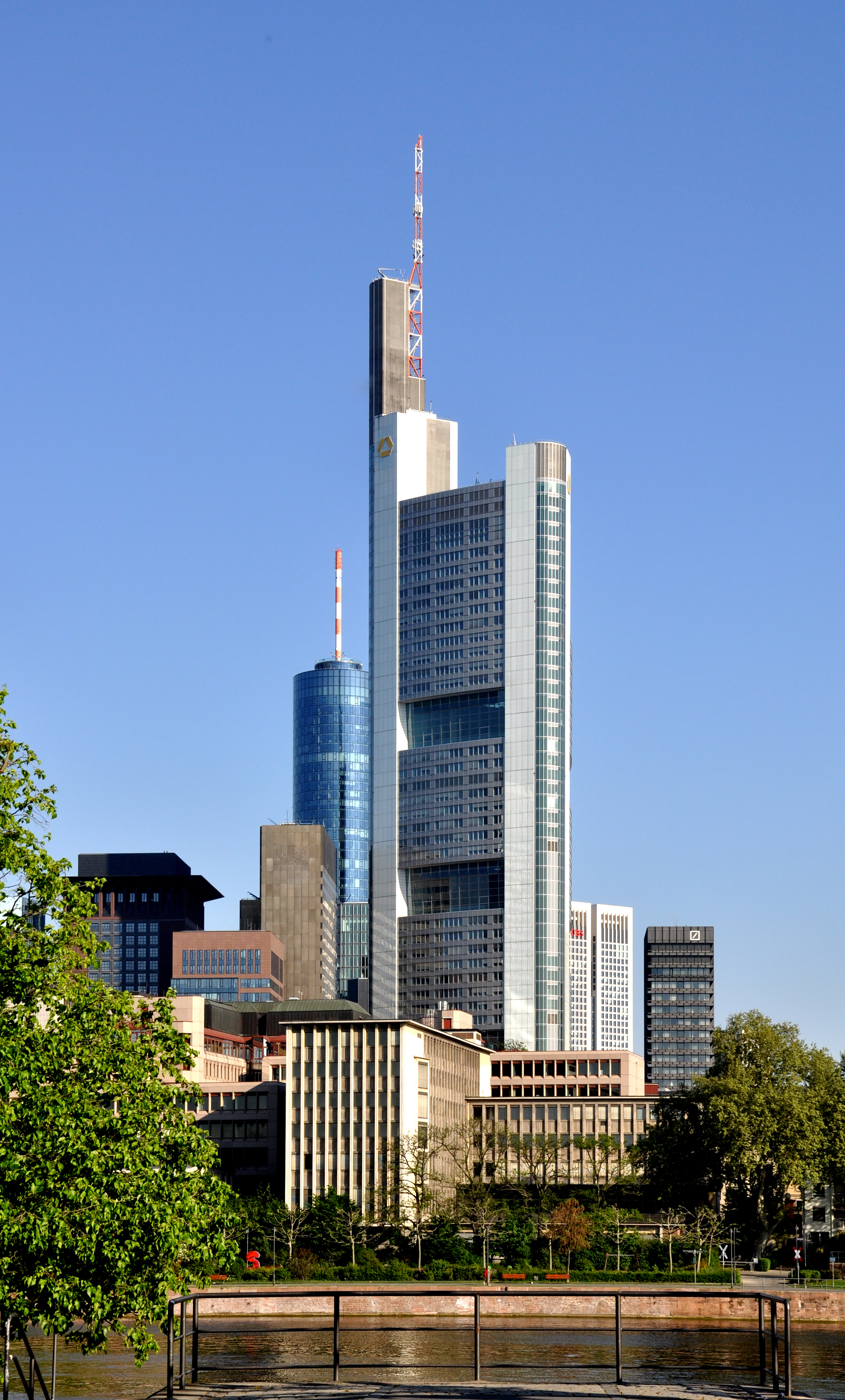
Commerzbank

=== Chemical and pharmaceutical ===
The Rhine-Main Region has the second largest industrial density in Germany after the Ruhr area. The main economic fields of importance are the chemical and pharmaceutical industries with Sanofi, Merck, Heraeus, Stada, Messer Griesheim, Bayer Crop Science, SGL Carbon, Celanese, Cabot, Clariant, Akzo Nobel, Kuraray, Ineos, LyondellBasell, Allessa and Evonik Industries. But also other consumer goods are produced by Procter & Gamble, Coty and Colgate Palmolive.

The Rhine-Main Region is not restricted only to Hesse: a smaller part is in the state of Rhineland-Palatinate. This contains two important pharmaceutical companies, both near the border with Hesse:

- BioNTech(HQ), in Mainz, which developed the first mRNA vaccine against COVID-19 in the world (licensed to Pfizer
- Boehringer Ingelheim, in Ingelheim. It supports from Max Planck Institute for Heart and Lung Research, Max Planck Institute for Brain Research and Paul Ehrlich Institute.

There are also important pharmaceutical and medical manufacturers in other parts of Hesse, especially in Marburg where there is an industrial park based on the former Behring Werke: BioNTech (mRNA vaccines), CSL Behring, Temmler and Melsungen with B. Braun.

Pharmaceutical activity in Marburg is also supported from research facilities: Max Planck Institute for Terrestrial Microbiology, Center for undiagnosed and rare diseases, Institute of Virology (Marburg)(research into the Ebola virus and the Marburg virus; Parasitology) with BSL4-Labor, Marburg Heavy Ion Beam Therapy Center.

Merck controls about 60% of world's liquid crystal market.

Heraeus, Umicore and Evonik Industries manufacture different types of catalysts, including platinum metals, vanadium, neodymium, manganese and copper.

In east Fulda there is the tire plant (Fulda Reifen). Two other tire plants are in Korbach (Continental) and Hanau (Goodyear).

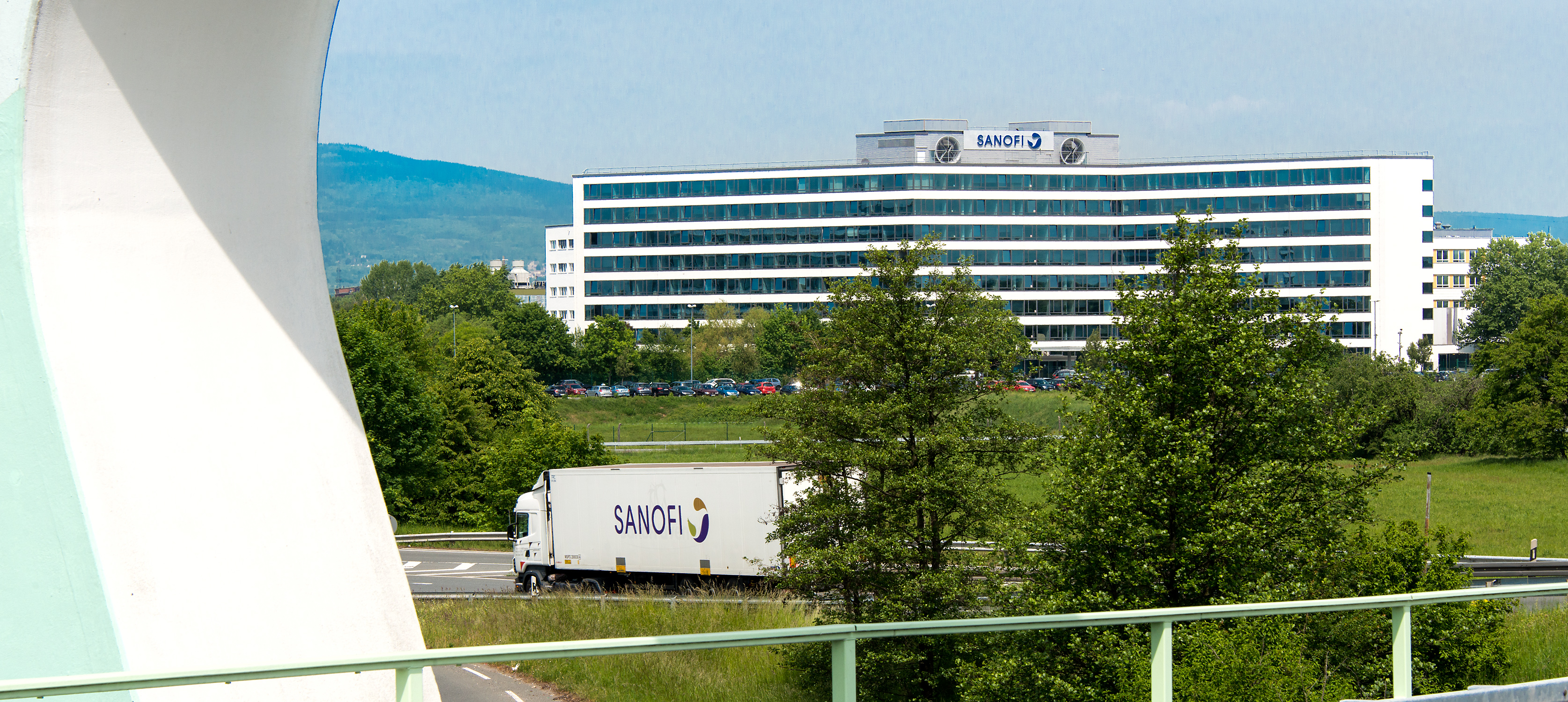
Sanofi in Industrial Park "Höchst"

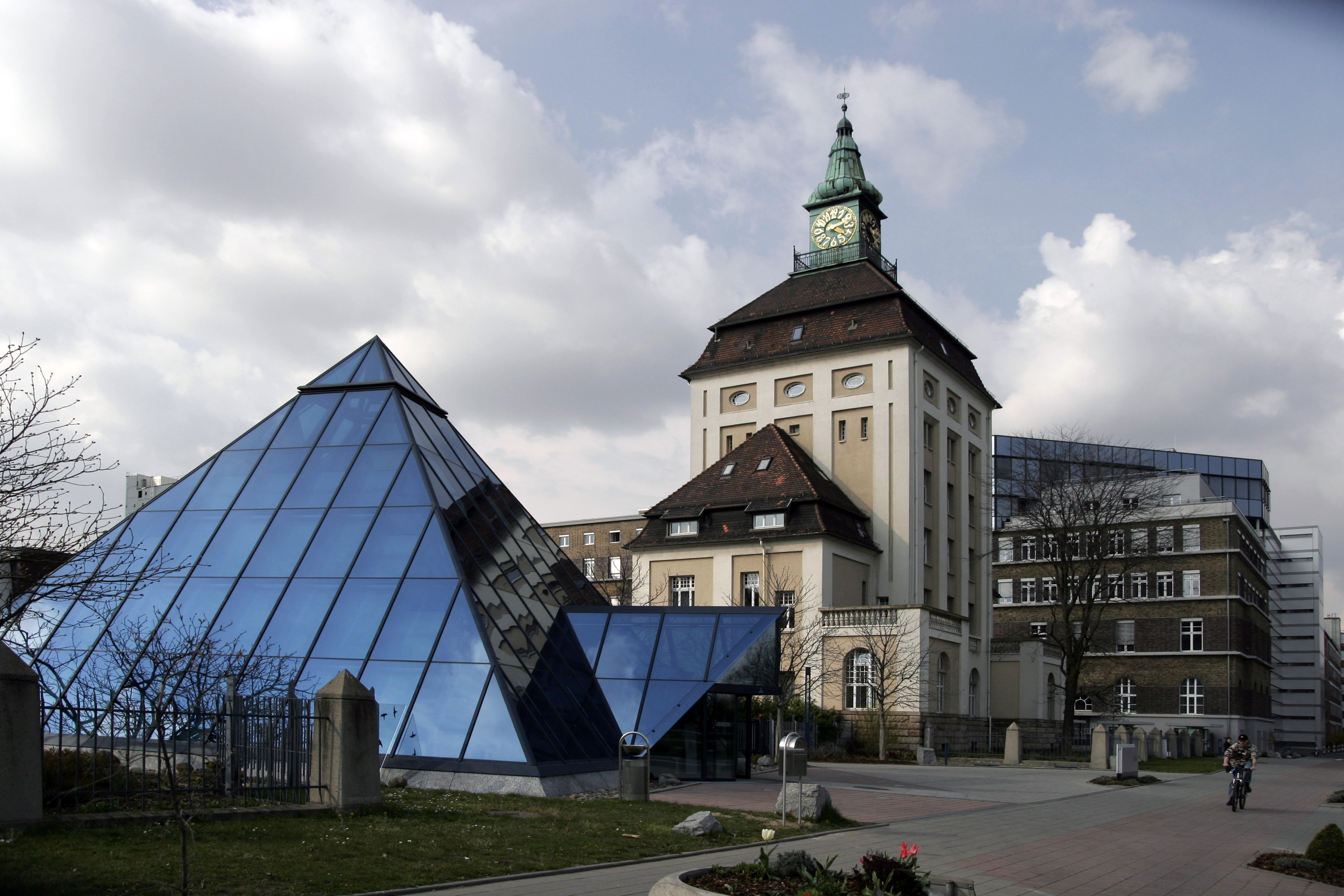
Merck in Darmstadt

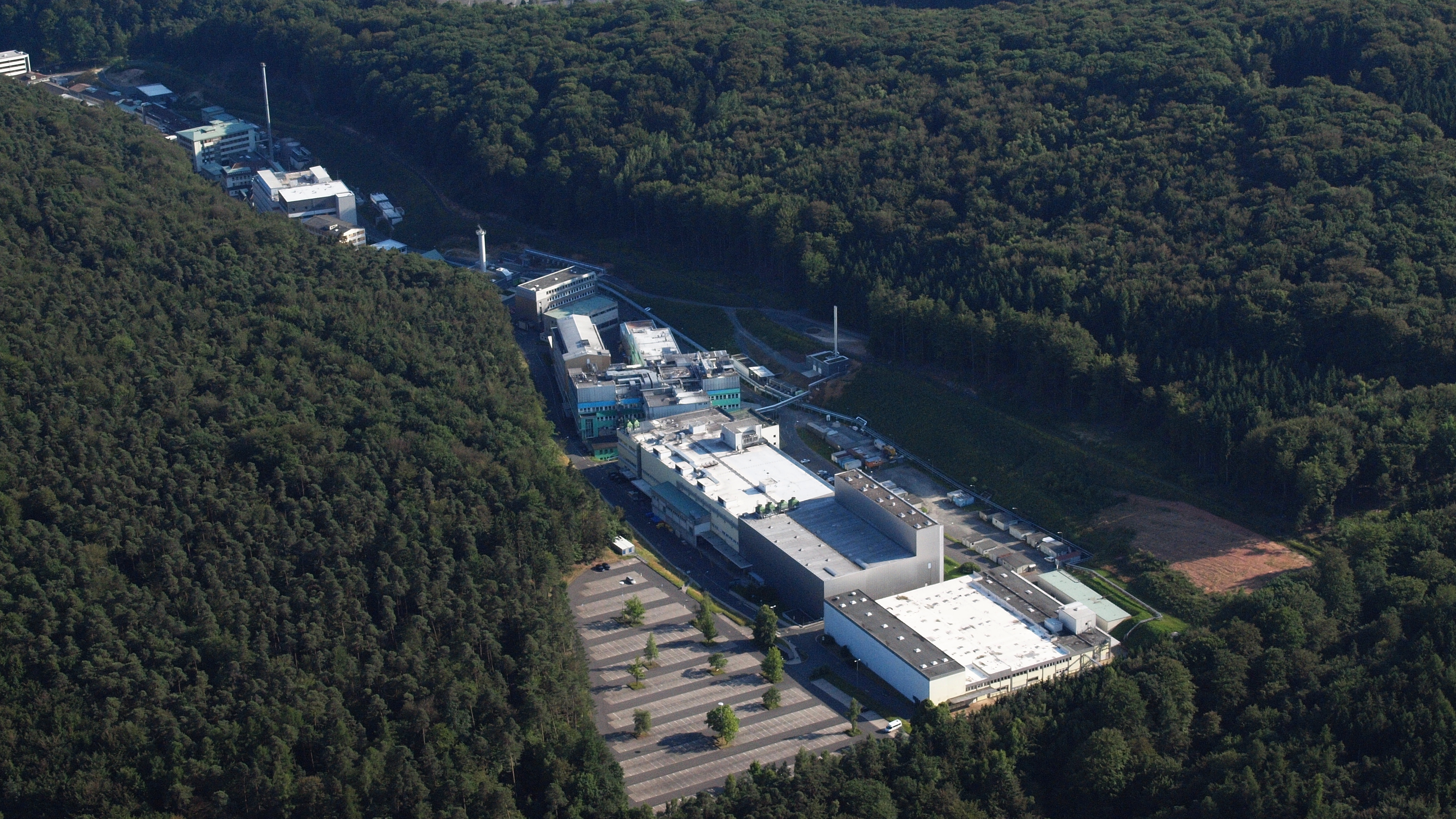
Industrial Park "Behringwerke"

=== Metallurgy and nuclear ===
Specialised metallurgical industry focused on platinum metals has been represented by Heraeus and Umicore and magnetic materials have been a focus of Vacuumschmelze based in Hanau. Also in Hanau there used to be a plant producing nuclear fuel (classical uranium, but also MOX fuel), but the production has stopped and the facility has been mothballed. Heraeus continues to manufacture irradiation sources from Cobalt and Iridium.

=== Engineering ===
In the mechanical and automotive engineering field Opel in Rüsselsheim is worth mentioning. After acquisition Opel by Stellantis, it is in rapid decline of production and employment. Which has also negative effect on automotive parts supplier, Continental will close a plant in Karben and cut jobs at other location in Hesse. In northern Hesse, in Baunatal, Volkswagen AG has a large factory that manufactures spare parts, not far-away from it there is also a Daimler Truck plant, which produces an axes.

Alstom, after takeover of Bombardier, has a large plant that manufactures Traxx locomotives in Kassel. Industrial printers (Manroland, Gallus Holding), x-ray airport check equipment (Smiths), handling and loading equipment (Dematic), chemical equipment (Air Liquide Global E&C Solutions), vacuum pumps (Pfeiffer Vacuum), vacuum industrial furnace (ALD Vacuum Technologies), textile machines (Karl Mayer), shavers (Braun), medical (Fresenius, Sirona) and industrial (Schenck Process, Samson) apparatuses are produced in Rhine-Main Region.

Manufacturing of heating boilers and heat pumps are typical for Hesse and represented with Bosch Thermotechnik and Viessmann.

Vistec produces electron-beam lithography systems for semiconductor industry in Weilburg, also there is manufacturing of inspection, testing and measurement equipment for semiconductor fabrication process from KLA-Tencor. Leica Microsystems manufactures different types of microscopes, inclusive they with special light microscopic optics, which are used in wafer and photo mask testing. PVA TePla from Wettenberg is specialist for crystal growing process (Si, Ge, GaAs, GaP, InP) with Czochralski Process, Float-Zone Process, High-Temperature Chemical Vapor Deposition, Vertical Gradient Freeze equipment, quality inspection apparatus, plasma and vacuum machine. ABB Robotics is in Friedberg. Satisloh is a machine manufacturer in Wetzlar for the production of lenses and components for the optical industry.

=== Aerospace ===
The company operating Frankfurt Airport is one of the largest employers in Hesse with nearly 22,000 employees. Aerospace cluster contains also Rolls-Royce's aviation engine work in Oberursel and APU manufacturing plant and service center of Honeywell in Raunheim.

=== Optics and electronics ===
Companies with an international reputation are located outside the Rhine-Main region in Wetzlar. There is the center of the optical, electrical and precision engineering industries, Leitz, Leica, Minox, Hensoldt (Zeiss) and Brita with several plants in central Hesse.

Oculus Optikgeräte manufactures Scheimpflug tomographs for examining the anterior segment of the eye, topographers for measuring the anterior surface of the cornea, tonometers for assessing the biomechanical properties of the cornea, a wide-angle observation system for vitreous body surgery, universal trial goggles for subjective refraction, various perimeters for visual field testing and vision testing devices for testing eyesight.

Electrical transformers are produced by Hitachi ABB Power Grids in Hanau and Siemens Energy in Frankfurt-am-Main. SMA Solar Technology manufactures an inverters for photovoltaic systems. Rittal is specialized on electrical enclosure situated in Herborn and Eschenburg. Power semiconductors from IXYS in Lampertheim and UV and infrared lamps from Heraeus.

=== IT and telecom ===
Many IT and telecommunications companies are located in Hesse, most of them in Frankfurt and Darmstadt, like Software AG (Darmstadt), T-Systems (Frankfurt and Darmstadt), Deutsche Telekom (laboratories in Darmstadt), DB Systel (Frankfurt), Lufthansa Systems (Raunheim near Frankfurt), DE-CIX (Frankfurt), and BT Group (Frankfurt and Eschborn).

=== Food and beverages ===
Sweet making is typical: there are two large factories: Ferrero, Stadtallendorf and Baronie (Sarotti), Hattersheim am Main. Frankfurter Sausage is famous, but there is also other sorts like Frankfurter Rindswurst, Ahle Wurst.

The beverages industry is well-developed and manufactures sparkling wine (Sekt), white wine (Riesling), mineral waters (Selters), beers (Radeberger) and cider.

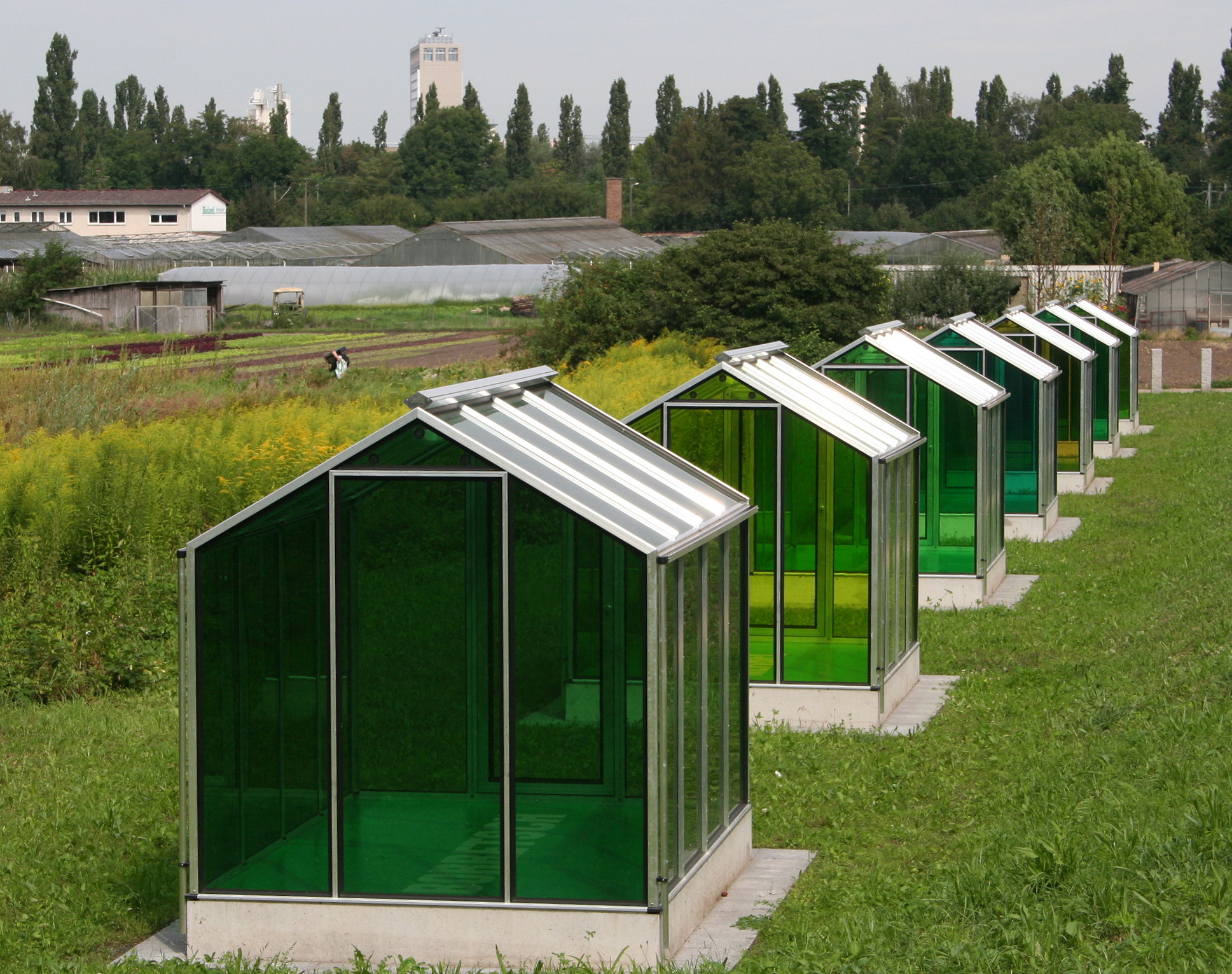
Green Sauce Monument

In Oberrad, a district of Frankfurt, wild herbs are grown for green sauce. There is even a green sauce monument, which consists of seven greenhouses in different shades of green.

=== Defunct industries ===
The leather industry was predominantly based in Offenbach, but is now extinct, existing only in museums. The same happened with Frankfurt's fur industry and Hanau's jewelry industry.

=== Typical Hesse products ===
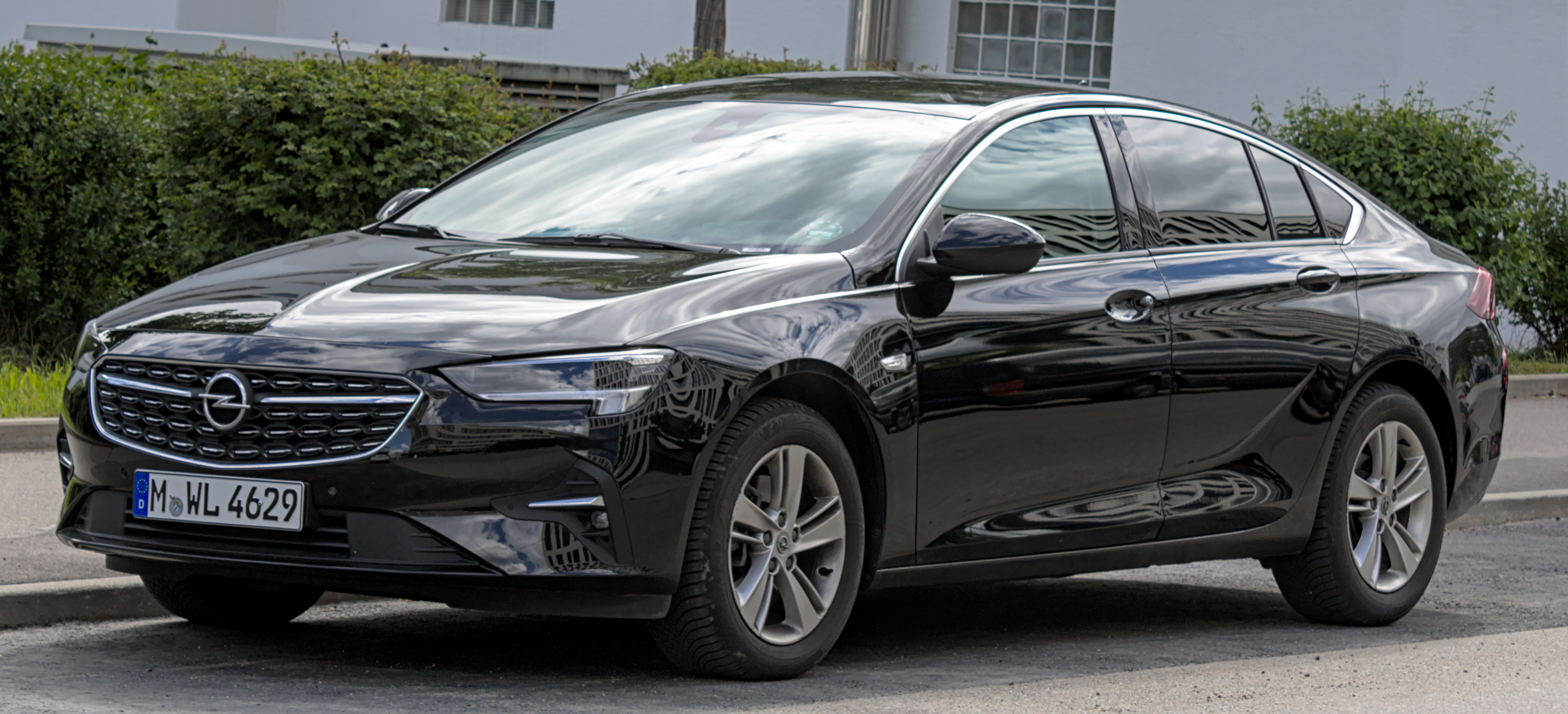
Opel Insignia

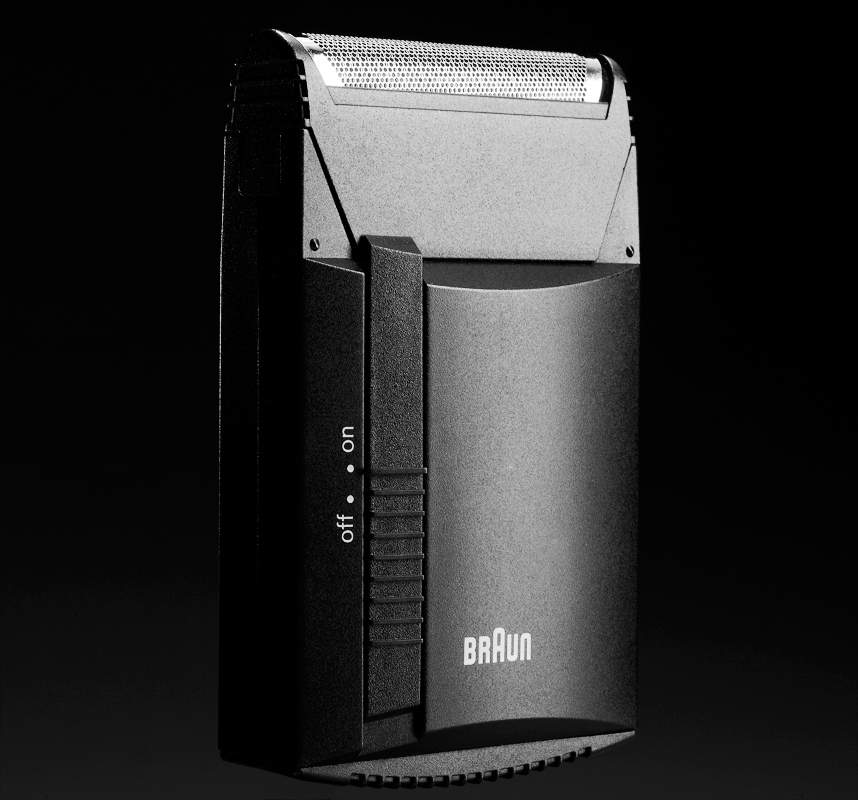
Braun Shaver

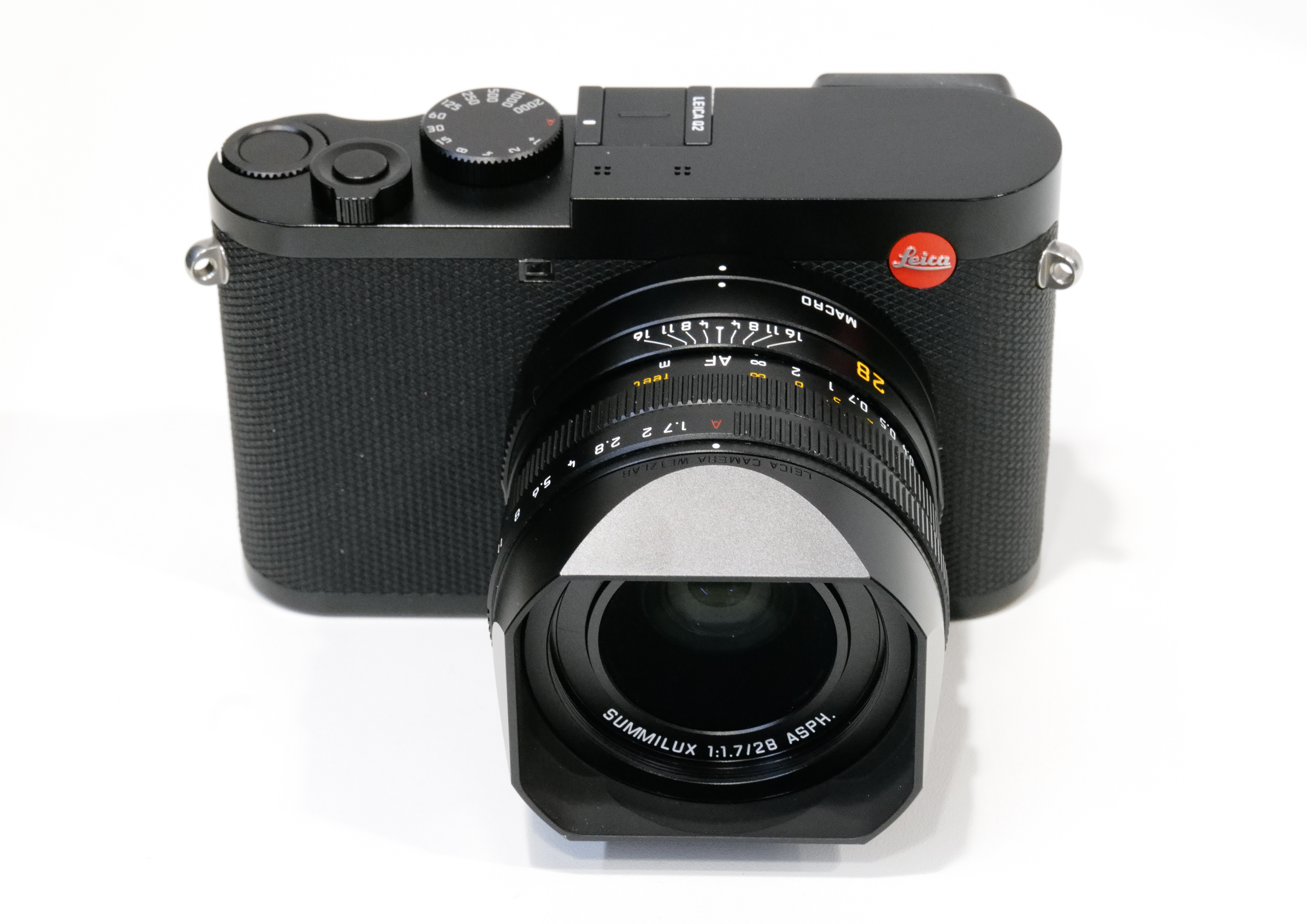
Leica Q2

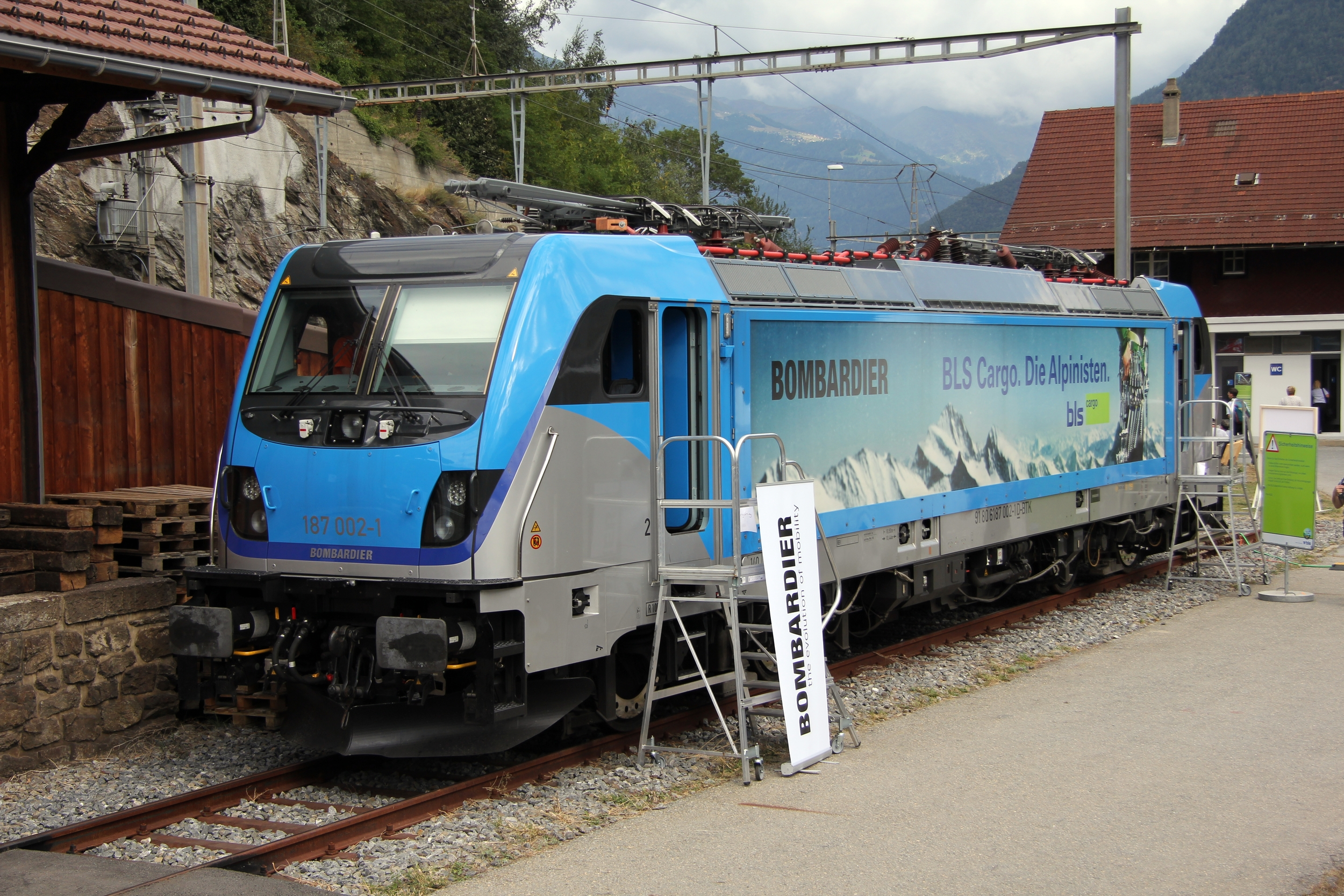
Locomotive TRAXX

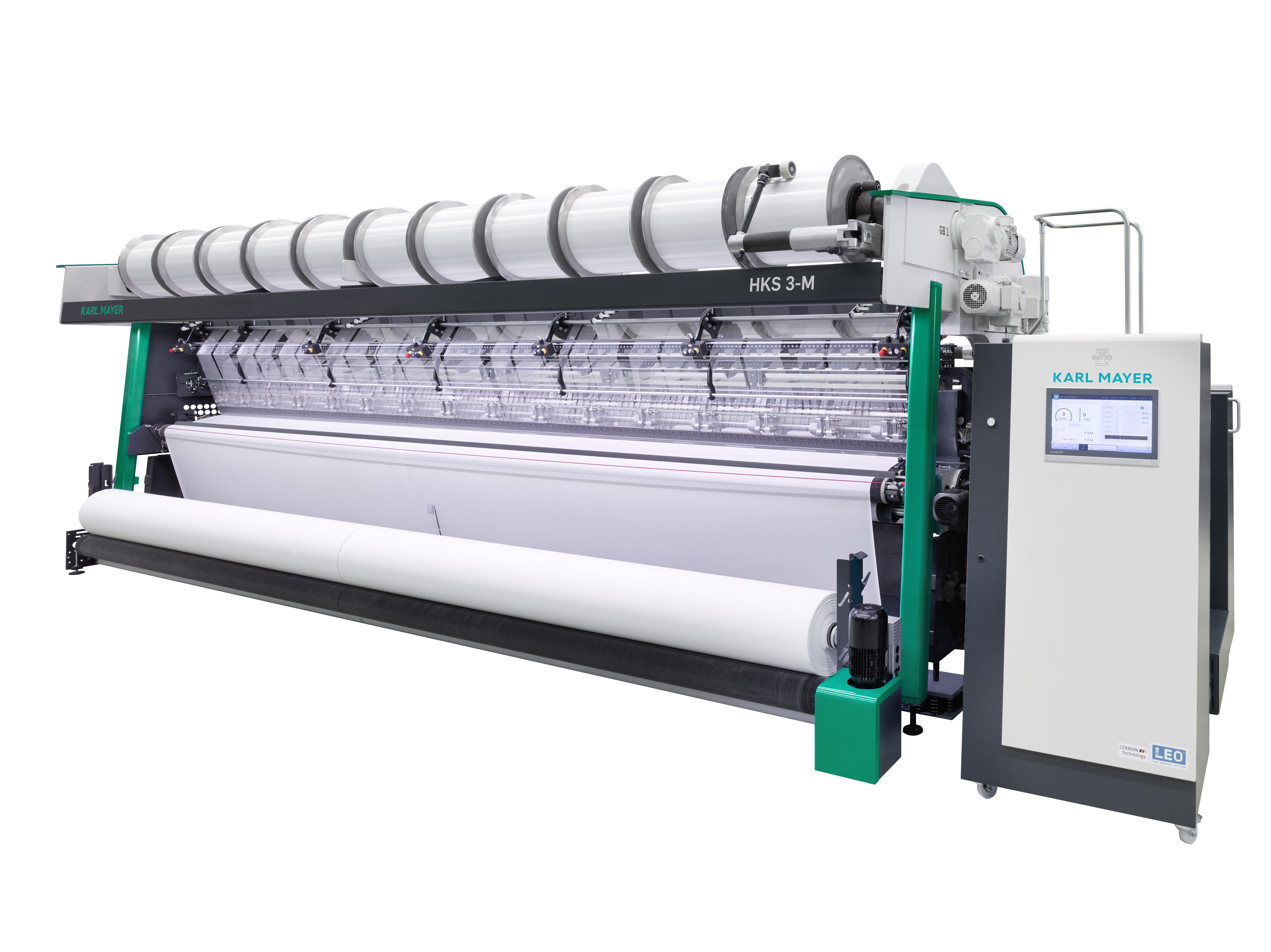
Warp knitting machine (Karl Mayer)

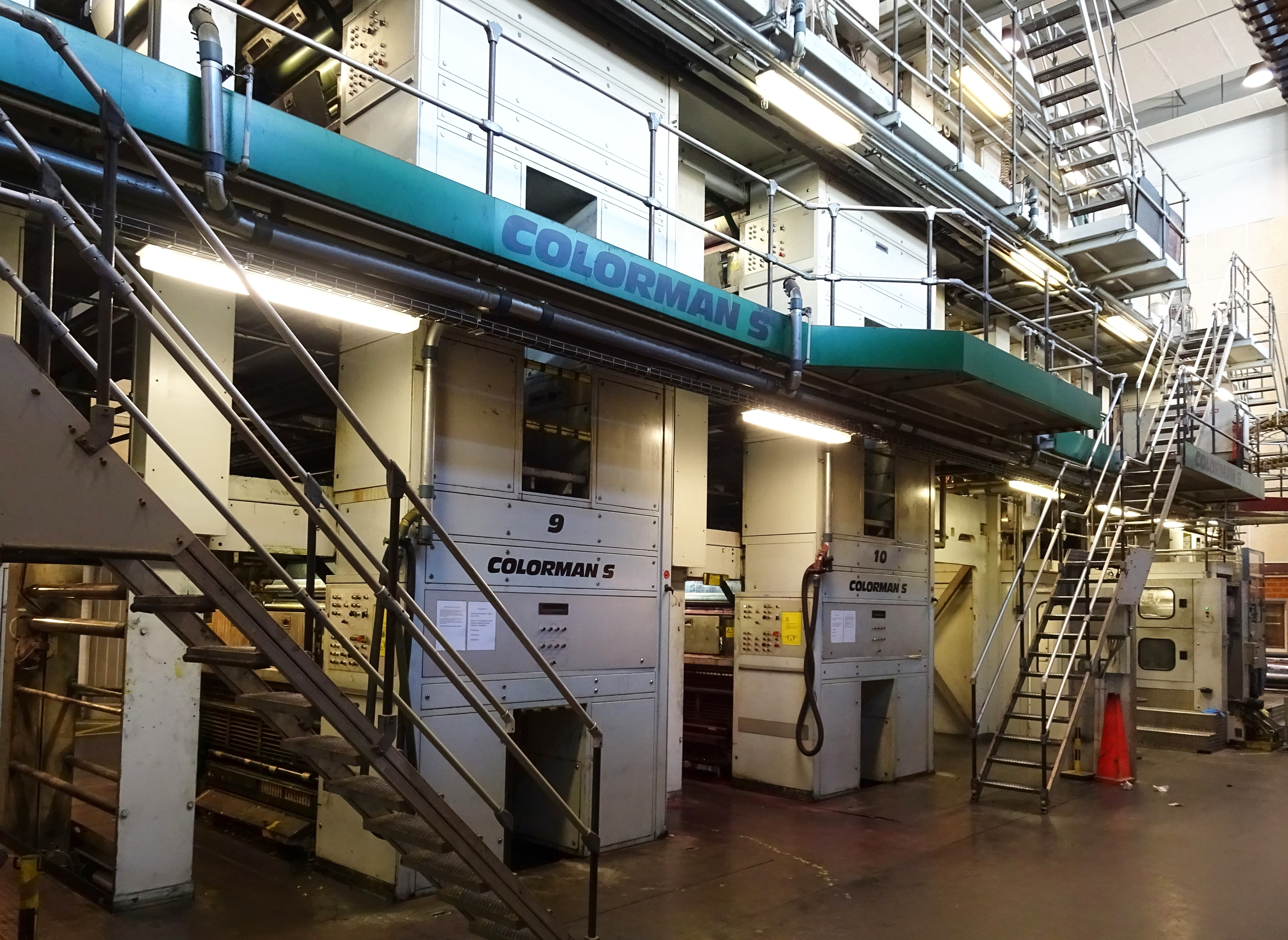
Printing machine (MAN Roland Colorman)

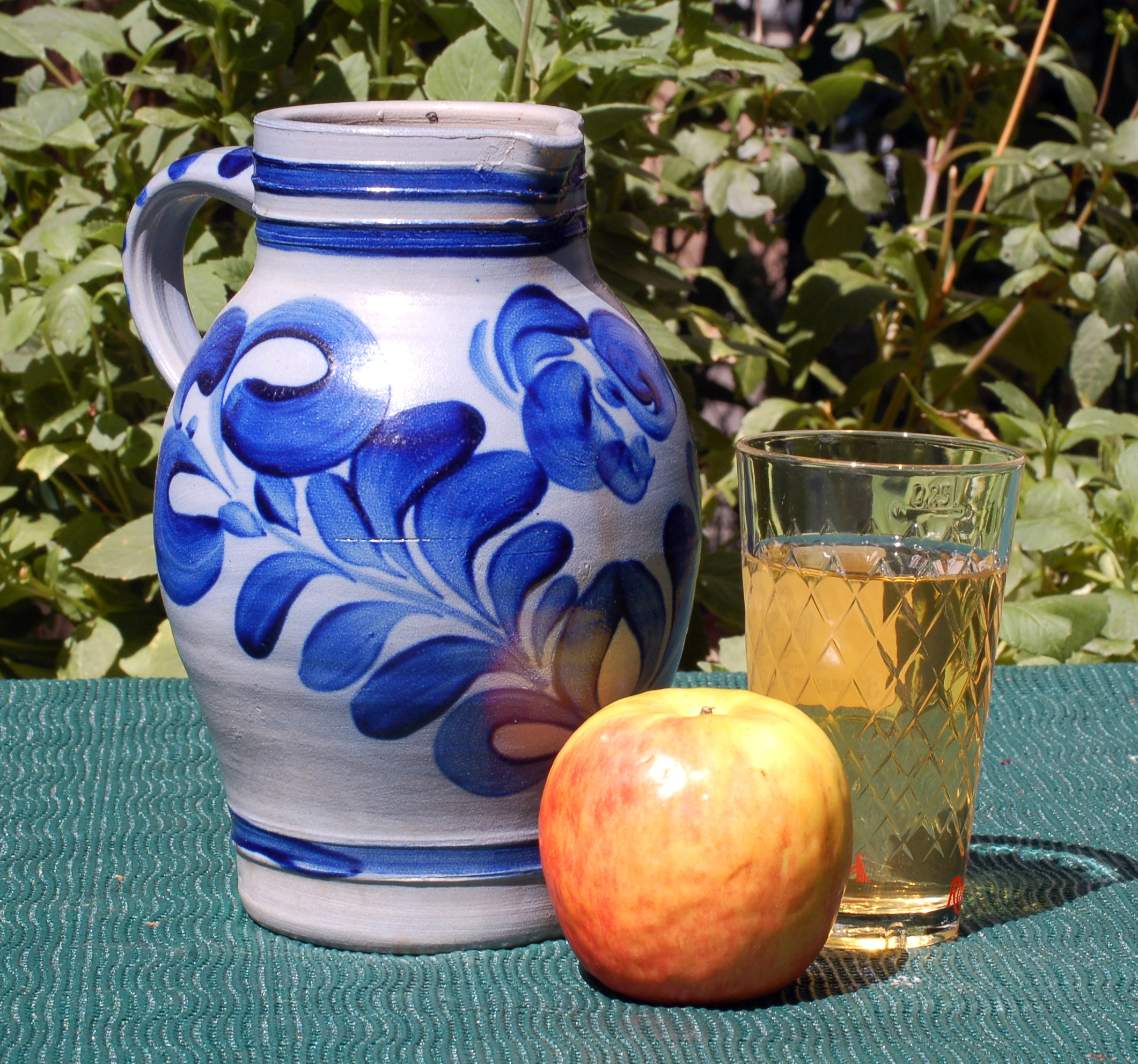
Apfelwein (Cider)

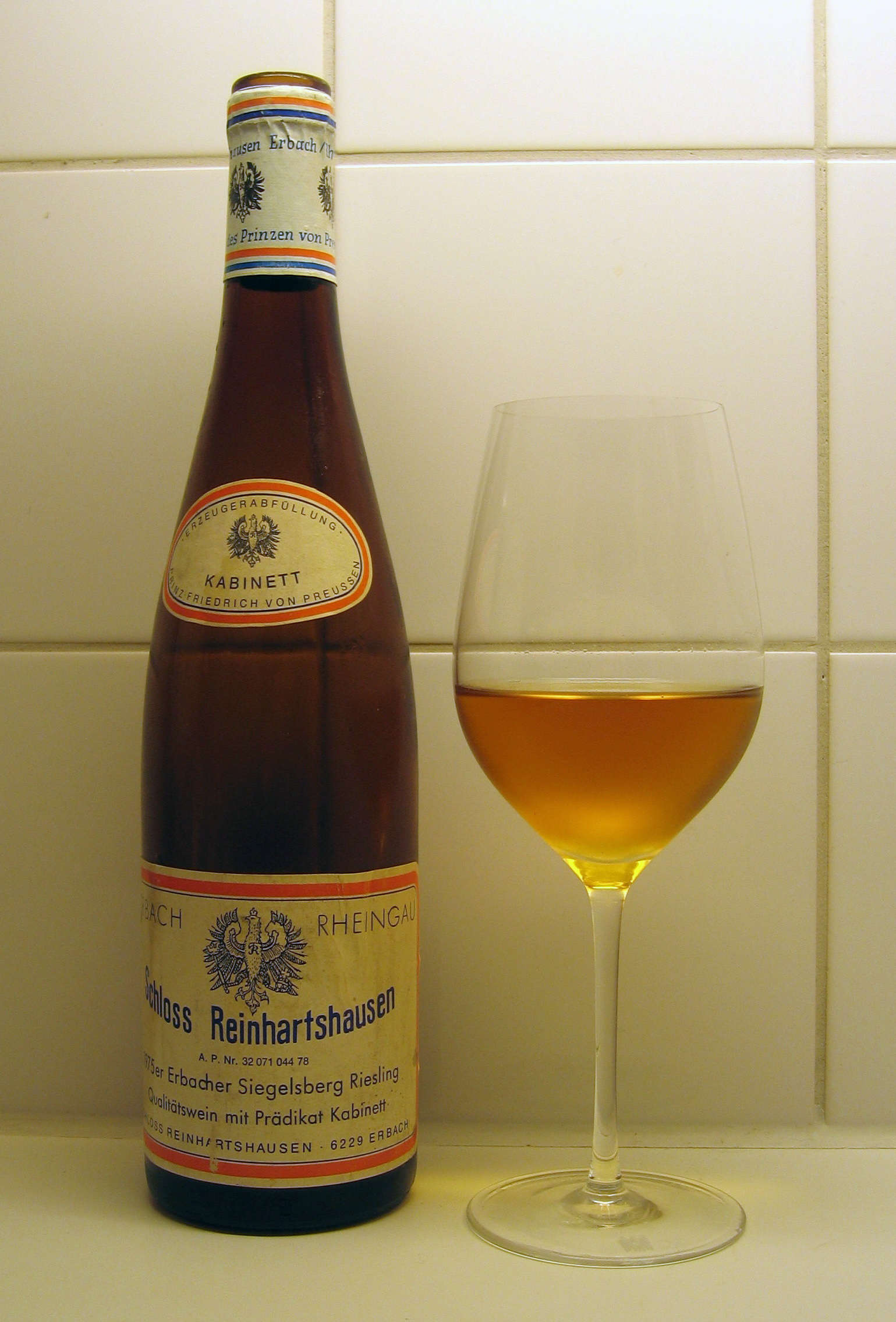
Riesling wine

=== Unemployment ===
The Hochtaunuskreis has the lowest unemployment rate at 3.8% while the independent city of Kassel has the highest rate nationally at 12.1%. In October 2018 the unemployment rate stood at 4.4% and was lower than the national average.

Year	2000	2001	2002	2003	2004	2005	2006	2007	2008	2009	2010	2011	2012	2013	2014	2015	2016	2017	2018	2019	2020	2021
Unemployment rate in %	7.3	6.6	7.0	7.9	8.2	9.7	9.2	7.5	6.5	6.8	6.4	5.9	5.7	5.8	5.7	5.5	5.3	5.0	4.6	3.1	4.1	3.8

== Traffic and public transportation ==
=== Road transport ===
Hesse has a dense highway network with a total of 24 motorways. The internationally important motorway routes through Hesse are the A3, A5, and A7. Close to Frankfurt Airport is the Frankfurter Kreuz, Germany's busiest and one of Europe's busiest motorway junctions, where the motorways A3 (Arnhem-Cologne-Frankfurt-Nuremberg-Passau) and A5 (Hattenbach-Frankfurt-Karlsruhe-Basel) intersect. The A5 becomes as wide as four lanes in each direction near the city of Frankfurt am Main, and during the rush-hour, it is possible to use the emergency lanes on the A3 and A5 motorway in the Rhine-Main Region, adding additional lanes. Other major leading Hesse highways are the A4, the A44, the A45, the Federal Highway A66 and the A67. There are also a number of smaller motorways and major trunk roads, some of which are dual carriageways.

=== Railway transport ===
Rail transport infrastructure map of Hesse.

Hesse is accessed by many major rail lines, including the high-speed lines Cologne–Frankfurt (top speed 300 km/h) and Hanover–Würzburg. Other north-south connections traverse major east–west routes from Wiesbaden and Mainz to Frankfurt and from Hanau and Aschaffenburg to Fulda and Kassel. The Frankfurt Central Station is the most important hub for German trains, with over 1,100 trains per day.

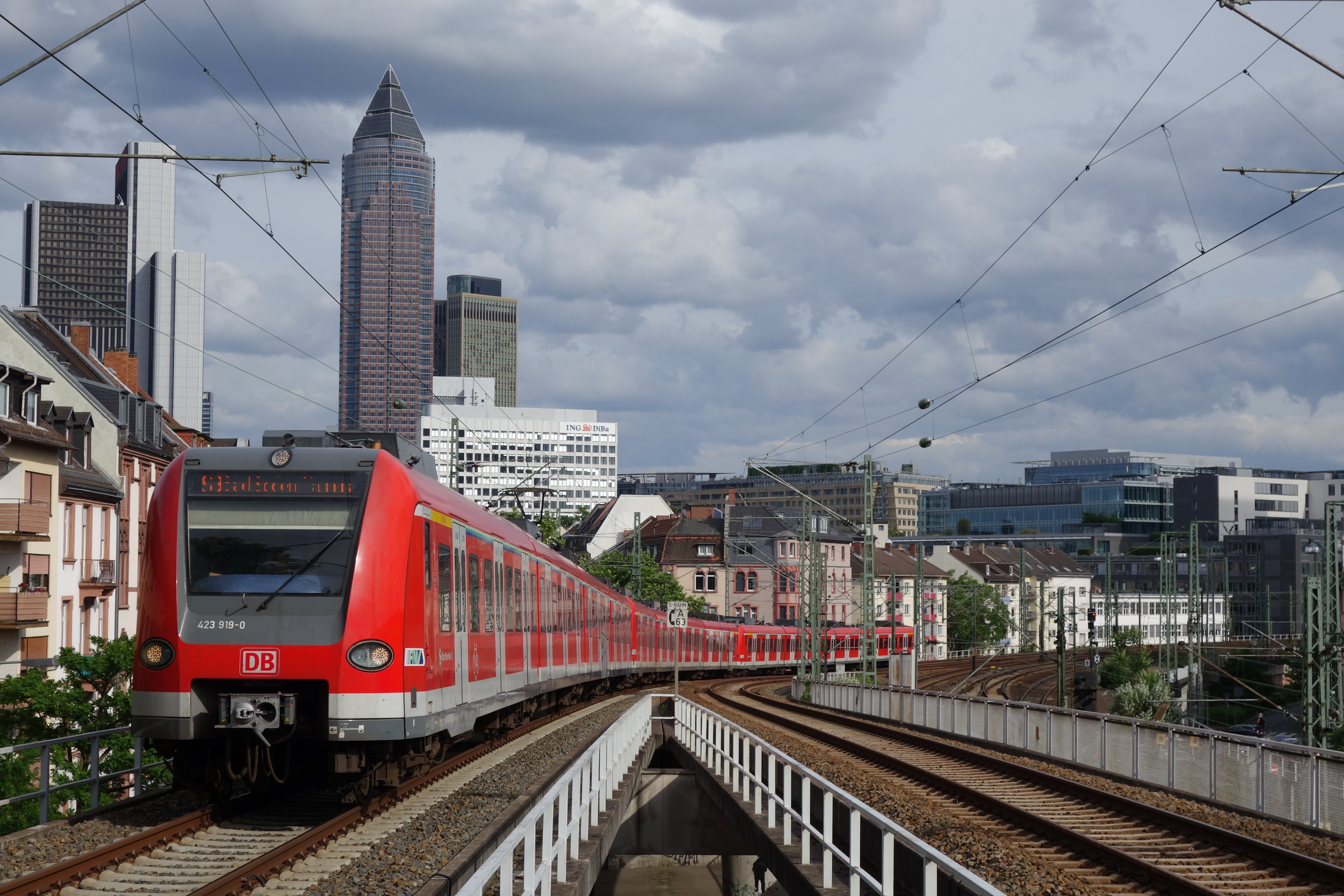
S-Bahn Rhein-Main: Class 423 approaching Frankfurt West station

Rhein-Main-Verkehrsverbund (RMV)

The region around Frankfurt has an extensive S-Bahn network, the S-Bahn Rhein-Main, which is complemented by many regional train connections. In the rest of the state, the rail network is less extensive. Since 2007, the region around Kassel has been served by the RegioTram, a tram-train concept similar to the Karlsruhe model.

There are two public transport associations in Hesse: the Nordhessischer Verkehrsverbund (NVV) and the Rhein-Main-Verkehrsverbund (RMV).

=== Air transport ===
Frankfurt Airport is by far the largest airport in Germany with more than 57 million passengers each year, and among the world's ten largest. The airport is also the hub of Lufthansa. Frankfurt Egelsbach Airport lies to the south, and is used by general aviation and private planes. Kassel Airport offers a few flights to holiday destinations, but has struggled to compete. There are also a number of sports airfields. Low-cost airlines, especially Ryanair, use Frankfurt-Hahn Airport as a major base, although the airport is actually located about 100 km from Frankfurt in the neighbouring state of Rhineland-Palatinate. The DFS (German air traffic control) has its headquarters in Langen.

== Sources ==
- Ingrao, Charles W. The Hessian mercenary state: ideas, institutions, and reform under Frederick II, 1760–1785 (Cambridge University Press, 2003).
- Ingrao, Charles. "" Barbarous Strangers": Hessian State and Society during the American Revolution." American Historical Review 87.4 (1982): 954–976. online
- Wegert, Karl H. "Contention with Civility: The State and Social Control in the German Southwest, 1760–1850." Historical Journal 34.2 (1991): 349–369. online
- Wilder, Colin F. "" The rigor of the law of exchange": How People Changed Commercial Law and Commercial Law Changed People (Hesse-Cassel, 1654–1776)." Zeitschrift für Historische Forschung (2015): 629–659. online
- Clay, John-Henry (2010). In the Shadow of Death: Saint Boniface and the Conversion of Hessia, 721-54. Brepols. ISBN 978-2-503-53161-8.
- Rau, Reinhold (1968). Briefe des Bonifatius, Willibalds Leben des Bonifatius; Nebst Einigen Zeitgenössischen Dokumenten. Ausgewählte Quellen zur Deutschen Geschichte des Mittelalters (in German). Vol. IVb. Darmstadt: Wissenschaftliche Buchgesellschaft.
