= Heiligenberg (disambiguation) =

Heiligenberg is a municipality and a village in the Bodensee district, Baden-Württemberg, Germany.

Heiligenberg may also refer to:

== Places ==
=== Austria ===
- Heiligenberg, Austria in Upper Austria

=== Czech Republic ===
- Svatý Kopeček (German: Heiligenberg), a part of Olomouc

=== France ===
- Heiligenberg, Bas-Rhin, Alsace

=== Germany ===
- Heiligenberg bei Naumburg, part of the city of Naumburg, Hesse
- Heiligenberg bei Schönau, village in the district of Schönau in Rottal-Inn, Bavaria
- Heiligenberg bei Bruchhausen-Vilsen, village in the district of Bruchhausen-Vilsen in Diepholz, Lower Saxony
- Heiligenberg bei Hochspeyer, village in the district of Hochspeyer in Kaiserslautern, Rhineland-Palatinate

== Geographic areas ==
- Heiligenberg (Heidelberg), a mountain in the Odenwald near Heidelberg
- Heiligenberg (Naumburg), a mountain in the Kassel district of Hesse
- Heiligenberg, a mountain in Seeheim-Jugenheim in Darmstadt-Dieburg, Hesse
- Heiligenberg, a hill near Felsberg in Schwalm-Eder-Kreis, Hesse, see Heiligenburg Castle
- Heiligenberg, a mountain in Hochspeyer in Kaiserslautern, Rhineland-Palatinate

== Castles and palaces ==
- Schloss Heiligenberg, Hesse near Seeheim-Jugenheim in Darmstadt-Dieburg, Hesse
- Heiligenburg Castle or Heiligenberg Castle, a castle ruin on Heiligenberg near Felsberg in Schwalm-Eder-Kreis, Hesse
- Schloss Heiligenberg, Baden-Württemberg in Heiligenberg, Baden-Württemberg
- Heiligenberg (Leusden), an estate and former monastery in the Netherlands

== People ==
- Walter Heiligenberg (1938–1994), German biologist
