= Felsburg =

Historic site in Germany

Coordinates: 51.1359°N 9.4204°E

- Felsberg, Hesse
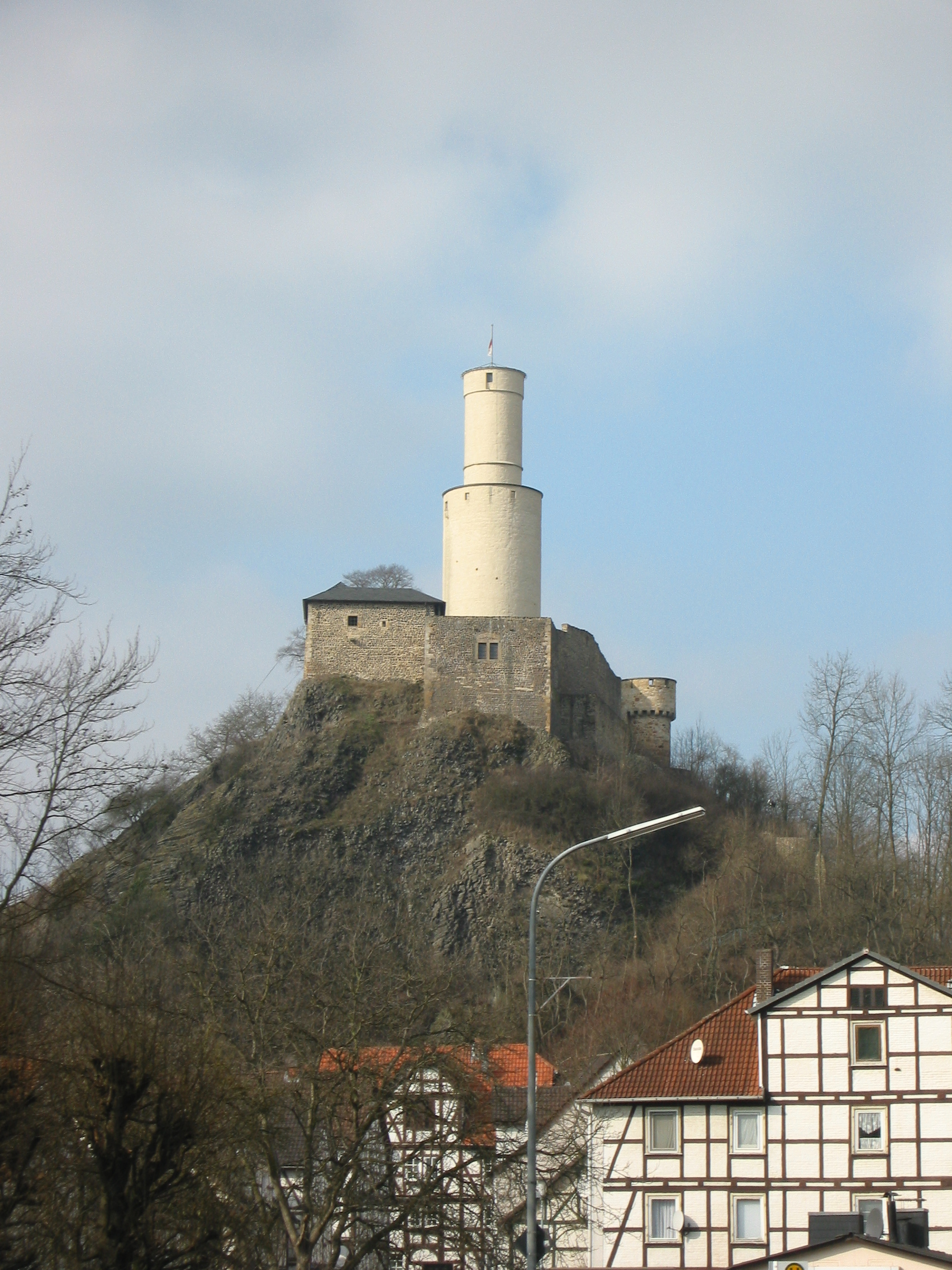
- Felsburg in Felsberg

Site information
- Type: Hill castle
- Owner: State of Hesse
- Condition: Ruin

Site history
- Built: 11th century

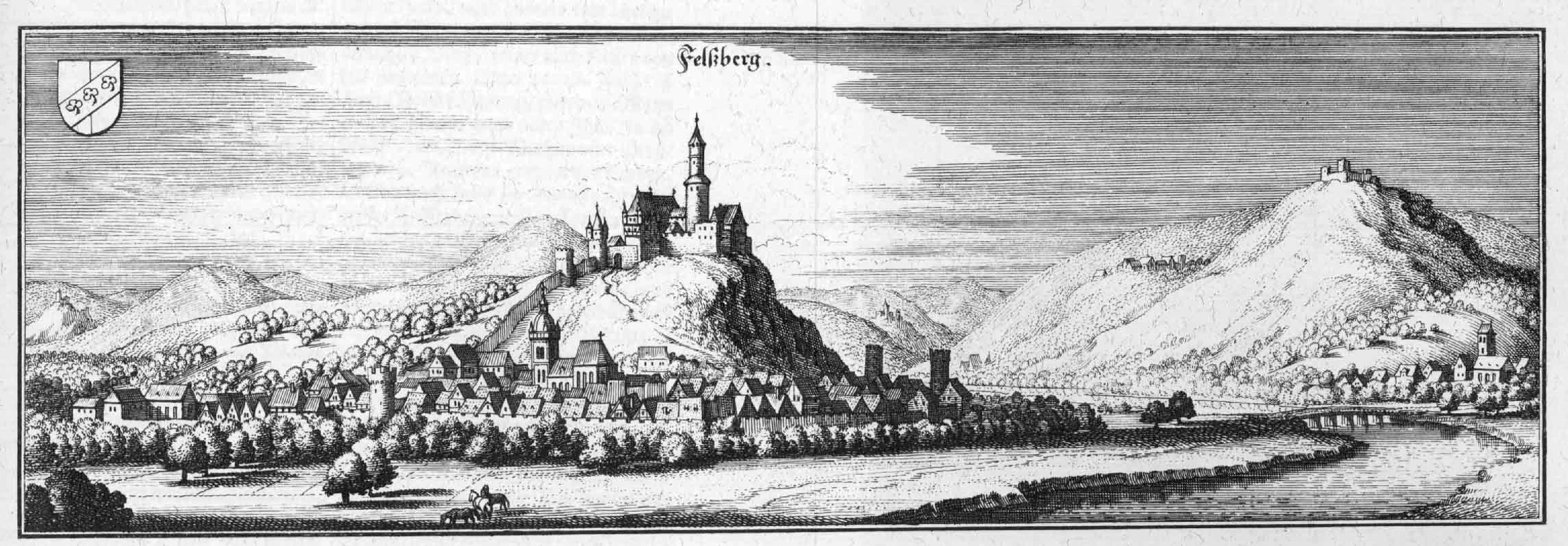
The town of Felsberg with Felsburg in the Topographia Hassiae by Matthäus Merian in the 17th century

Felsburg is a partial ruin of a hill castle situated in Felsberg on the Eder River in the Schwalm-Eder district of North Hesse, Germany.

== History ==
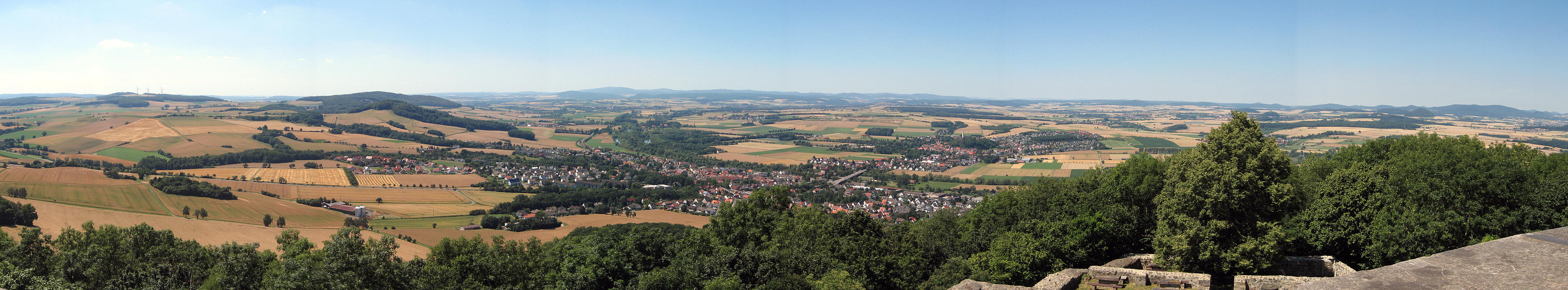
Scene of a conflict lasting over 200 years: The Felsburg in the Eder Valley, viewed from Heiligenberg Castle

The steep basalt cone, which rises about 40 meters above the Eder Valley in the center of the present-day town, was likely fortified with a wooden defensive structure as early as Chatti times (300–600 AD). From this vantage point, the Eder Valley could be controlled, particularly protecting the old salt trade route that ran from Bad Sooden-Allendorf on the Werra River to the Ruhr region, crossing the Eder via a ford.

The castle and the (vice-)counts residing there were first mentioned in documents in 1060 under the name Velisberc. The surrounding town was documented shortly after, in 1090. The ruling family belonged to the so-called Megin lineage and resided in the castle from at least 1090 until 1253. During this period, the construction of Heiligenberg Castle took place within sight of Felsburg as a direct counterfort. The Archbishop and Elector of Mainz sought to assert his claim against the Landgraves of Thuringia and later Hesse, resulting in a prolonged conflict that lasted until 1427, in which Felsburg played a crucial strategic role. The rulers of Felsberg gradually withdrew from the Eder Valley, ceding the castle and town to the Landgraviate of Thuringia in 1238. In 1253, Berthold of Felsberg donated most of his estates to Breitenau Monastery, and after 1286, the Felsberg vice-counts focused exclusively on their holdings around Hessisch Lichtenau. The family soon became extinct.

Following the division of Hesse and Thuringia after the death of Henry Raspe, Felsburg came under the control of the Landgraviate of Hesse. The castle then became the seat of various Hessian landgravial officials. In 1367, Hessian knights under the leadership of Knight Konrad Spiegel zum Desenberg defeated an army of the Hersfeld Abbot Berthold II of Völkershausen in the Eder Valley near the nearby Altenburg. In 1375, the landgravial ministerialis and Landvogt of Lower Hesse, Friedrich von Felsberg, resided in the castle; as early as 1373, the Landgrave had pledged him the tax revenues of the town of Felsberg. Beginning in 1333, Landgrave Henry II, "the Iron" expanded the Felsburg, and its defenses were further reinforced in 1387, 1388, and 1392.

During the Mainz-Hessian War of 1427, Landgrave Louis I of Hesse led his forces from Felsberg against the Mainzian commander Gottfried von Leiningen, who had devastated the areas around Gudensberg, Felsberg, and Melsungen with 600 cavalry from his base in Fritzlar. Louis decisively defeated him at the Großenengliser Platte between Fritzlar and Großenenglis and again near Fulda, despite Mainz Archbishop Conrad III of Dhaun personally taking command of the army. This forced Kurmainz to accept the Peace of Frankfurt.

From 1455 to 1458, the alchemist Klaus von Urbach lived in Felsburg. Landgrave Louis I had brought him there in hopes of producing gold. When it became evident that his experiments were futile, the alchemist was banished from the land.

Since 1511, the castle served as the widow's residence for Philip the Magnanimous' mother, Landgravine Anna, for several years (although she mostly resided on an estate in the town of Felsberg, which still exists and is in use today). From there, she fought for the guardianship of her children and the rule of the land. However, after this period, Felsburg disappeared from the focus of Hessian state politics and was never again the residence of a landgrave. From 1550 onwards, parts of the castle were gradually dismantled to facilitate the construction of the hunting lodge in Melsungen. Landgrave Maurice of Hesse-Kassel held his last state assembly at the castle in 1626 before his abdication. Felsburg survived the Thirty Years' War almost unscathed but gradually fell into disrepair. In 1762, during the Seven Years' War, the castle was captured by Hessian hunters under Major von Linsingen and shortly thereafter destroyed by French troops.

== The Structure ==
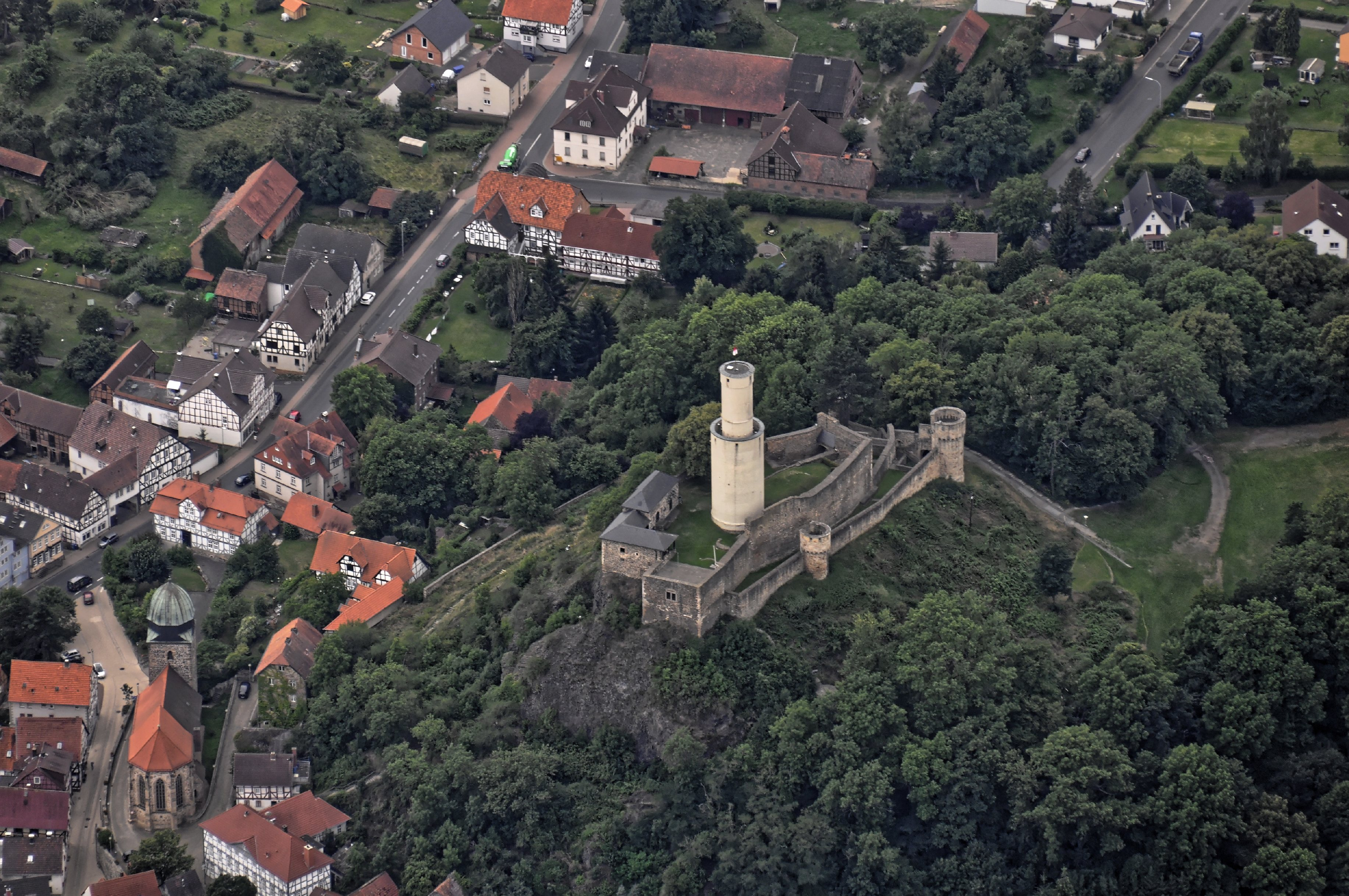
Aerial view of Felsburg (2015)

The hill castle has a nearly trapezoidal layout. On the north and west sides, there are late Gothic outer baileys with keyhole loopholes from the 14th century. The entrance gate also dates back to the 14th century. The gate is reinforced by two flanking towers and equipped with two machicolations at the base, allowing defenders to attack assailants below.

In the center of the castle, near the northern wall, stands the 29.5-meter (96.8 ft) high keep, in its current form dating from 1388. Originally, it was only 15 meters (49.2 ft) tall but was later increased by 14.5 meters (47.6 ft) as part of additional fortifications, making it one of the tallest castle towers in Hesse. A covered wall-walk was attached at the setback to the tower's upper section. The current entrance was later created by cutting through the 3.5-meter-thick (11.5 ft) walls. The entrance leads to the dungeon and, via steep internal wooden ladders, to two viewing levels at the surrounding wall-walk, approximately 15 meters (49.2 ft) high, and to the enclosed top level at about 26 meters (85.3 ft), which offers views of the surroundings through four small windows.

On the southern wall stands the castle chapel, dedicated to Saint Pancras. In 1544, Landgrave Philip the Magnanimous stored 297 barrels of gunpowder in the chapel. This powder magazine was in use for 300 years before being decommissioned in the era of the Electorate. The chapel—besides the keep—is the only preserved structure of the ensemble.

== Current Situation ==
Today, the castle is owned by the State of Hesse and maintained by the Administration of State Palaces and Gardens of Hesse. The Burgverein Felsberg 1885 e.V. originally leased the castle from the Prussian state and remains responsible for its preservation and upkeep; the original contract from 1885 was renewed and clarified in 1952 with the State of Hesse (as the legal successor of the Prussian state).

From 1950 onwards, conservation and restoration work was undertaken. Further extensive restoration efforts began in 1987, but due to financial difficulties, they lasted 18 years, during which the castle was closed to the public. A castle museum was set up in the chapel, and the restored cellar is now used for civil and church weddings during the summer months. In 2006, a carillon, funded by donations, was installed above the chapel's entrance.

The castle is open for visits on Sundays and public holidays.

== Literary Reference ==
In the style of the Romantic literary period, the North Hessian poet Georg Mohr (1870–1928) wrote a song about Felsburg. The melody corresponds to the musical setting of Eichendorff's poem In einem kühlen Grunde by Friedrich Glück.

1. Oh castle on rocky heights
In the lovely Eder valley,
I must always remember you,
You proud knightly monument.

2. Even as a boy, you held me captive,
The youthful, free spirit.
I searched for the blue flower,
That blooms high on the cliffs there.

3. I climbed the winding paths
Up the steep mountain
And greeted the grinning old man,
The stone head above the gate.

4. I sat on the old wall
So gladly dreaming alone,
When down in the valley the bells
Sounded in the evening glow.

5. I have gazed from your tower
Out into the lands
And greeted the heights and castles around
With joyful shouts.

6. Many a cherished hour
I spent up there
High above the bustle of men
In quiet contemplative peace.

7. And when from youth times
The bright memory shines upon me,
I must always remember you,
Oh Felsberg in Eder valley.

== Literature ==
- Rudolf Knappe: Medieval Castles in Hesse. 800 Castles, Castle Ruins, and Castle Sites. 3rd edition. Wartberg-Verlag, Gudensberg-Gleichen 2000, ISBN 3-86134-228-6, p. 79.
- Rolf Müller (Ed.): Castles, Fortresses, Old Walls. Published by Hessian State Chancellery, Wiesbaden 1990, ISBN 3-89214-017-0, pp. 77–79.
- Heinrich Ruppel, Humor in School, A. Bernecker Verlag, Melsungen, 1983, 3rd edition
