= Rhünda =

River in Germany

Rhünda Rhündabach
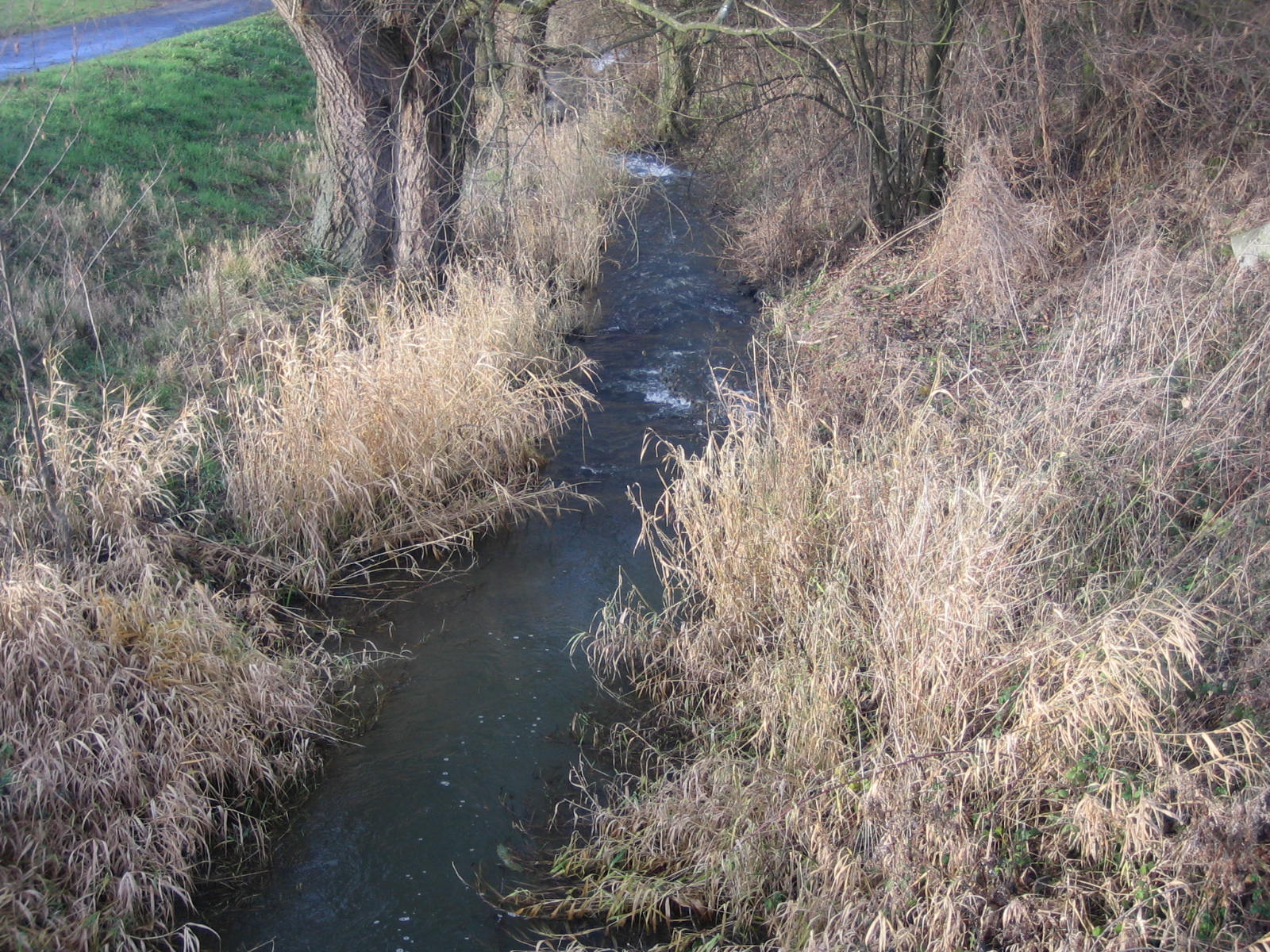

Location
- Country: Germany
- State: Hesse

Physical characteristics
- Source
  - location: Dickershausen
  - coordinates: 51.0556°N 9.4646°E
  - elevation: 327.5 m (1,074 ft)
- Mouth
  - location: Schwalm near Rhünda
  - coordinates: 51.1163°N 9.4043°E
  - elevation: 159 m (522 ft)
- Length: 13.0 km (8.1 mi)
- Basin size: 31.8 km^{2} (12.3 sq mi)
- Discharge
  - average: 44 m^{3}/s (1,600 cu ft/s)

Basin features
- Progression: Schwalm→ Eder→ Fulda→ Weser→ North Sea
- Tributaries
  - left: Hohlgraben, Tiefenbach, Frasenbach
  - right: none

The Rhünda (German pronunciation: [ˈrhʏnda]), also called the Rhündabach, is a 12.9 kilometres (8.0 mi) long, eastern tributary of the River Schwalm in the Schwalm-Eder-Kreis, North Hesse, Germany.

== Course ==
The Rhünda rises in the northern foothills of the Knüllgebirge. Its source is in the village of Dickershausen, part of the town of Homberg (Efze), at 327.5 metres (1,074 ft) above sea level.

Initially the Rhünda flows northeastward through Sipperhausen and then after turns away from the Stöpplingskopf, towards north-northwest. In this direction it flows through, approximately parallel to the Bundesautobahn 7 to the east, Ostheim, then flows west past the Geschellenberg hill (324 m (1,063 ft)) and then just to the east of the town of Mosheim.

The river meets a small stream close to Hilgershausen then flows southwest down to Helmshausen. After passing a mill, and two basalt quarries, the Rhünda reaches the Felsberg district of Rhünda, after it crosses under Bundesstraße 253, just before reaching the Main–Weser Railway at about 159 metres (522 ft) above sea level. There it opens into the River Schwalm, which, in turn, just after passing again under the railway line, flows in the River Eder.

== Tributaries ==
The tributaries of the Rhünda are all, orographically, on the left. They are:

- Hohlgraben (3.4 km (2.1 mi)), between Ostheim and Mosheim, length 8.65 km (5.37 mi), basin size 3,955 km^{2} (1,527 sq mi)
- Tiefenbach (3.9 km (2.4 mi)), between Hilgershausen and Helmshausen, length 5.2 km (3.2 mi), basin size 4,917 km^{2} (1,898 sq mi))
- Frasenbach (2.0 km (1.2 mi)), at Helmshausen

== Rhünda Skull ==
In 1956, a severe storm caused the Rhünda to wash away its bank near the town of Rhünda, close to the present-day sports area. About 80 centimetres (30 in) down a villager found a 12,000 years-old skull of a human, now known as The Rhünda Skull.

== See also ==
- List of rivers of Hesse
