= Lotterberg =

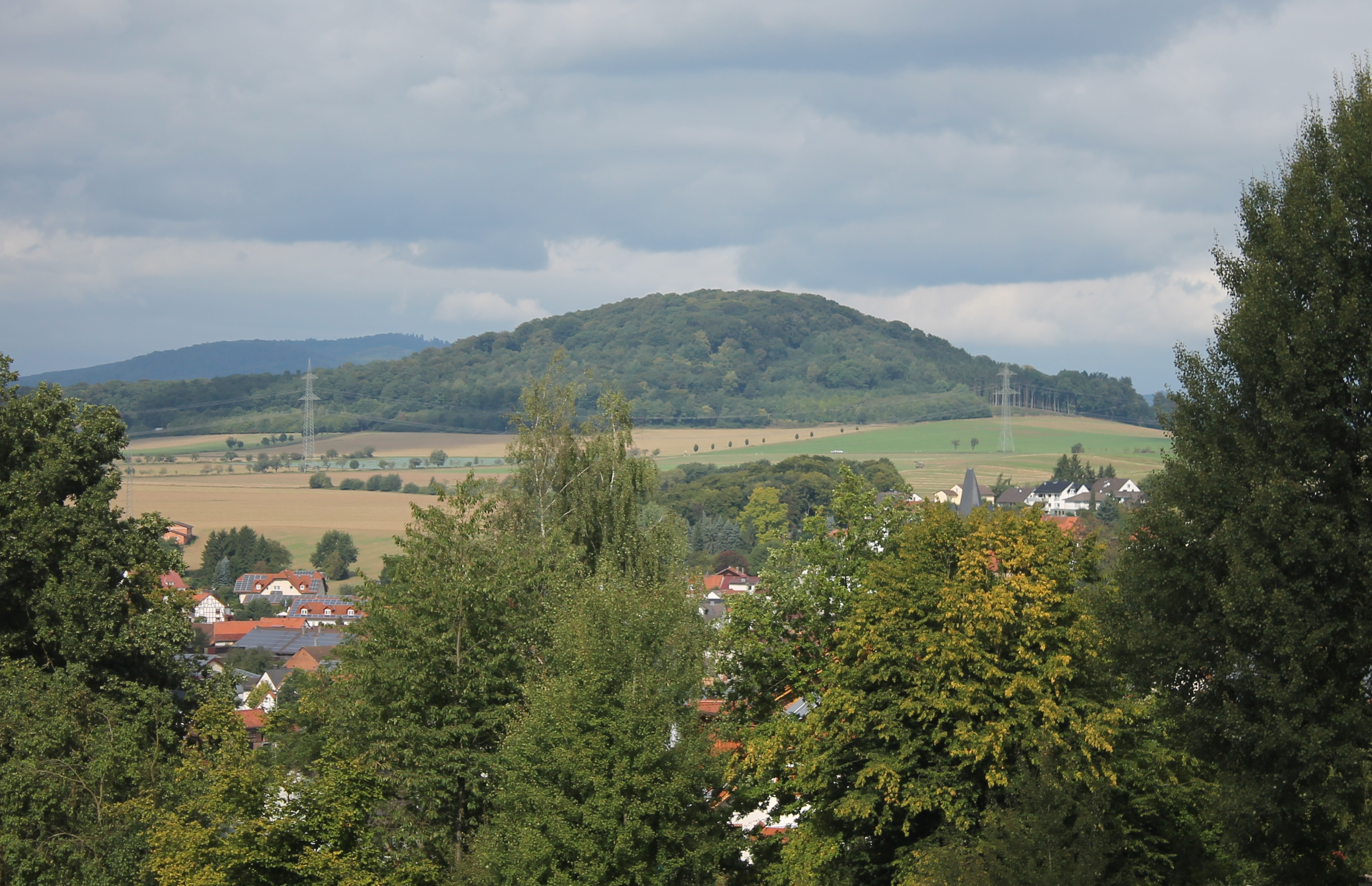
- View of Lotterberg from Altenbrunslar

Highest point
- Elevation: 305 m (1,001 ft) Normalhöhennull
- Prominence: 95 m (312 ft)
- Isolation: 1.8 km (1.1 mi)
- Coordinates: 51°11′6.72″N 9°25′15.99″E

Geography
- Location within Germany
- Location: Schwalm-Eder-Kreis, Hesse, Germany
- Parent range: West Hesse Depression

Geology
- Rock age: Miocene
- Mountain type: Extinct volcano

Lotterberg is a 305 m (1,001 ft) (NHN) high hill between the villages of Wolfershausen and Deute in Schwalm-Eder-Kreis, Hesse, Germany.

== Geology ==
The hill is composed of basalt that fills the neck of a now-extinct volcano. The volcanic activity was during the Miocene (Neogene), that is it started 20 million years ago and ended 7 million years ago. This volcano was one of many in the West Hesse Depression. The alkali basalt has a silica (SiO_{2}) volume percentage of 45–55%. The main minerals in the rock are plagioclase, augite and olivine.

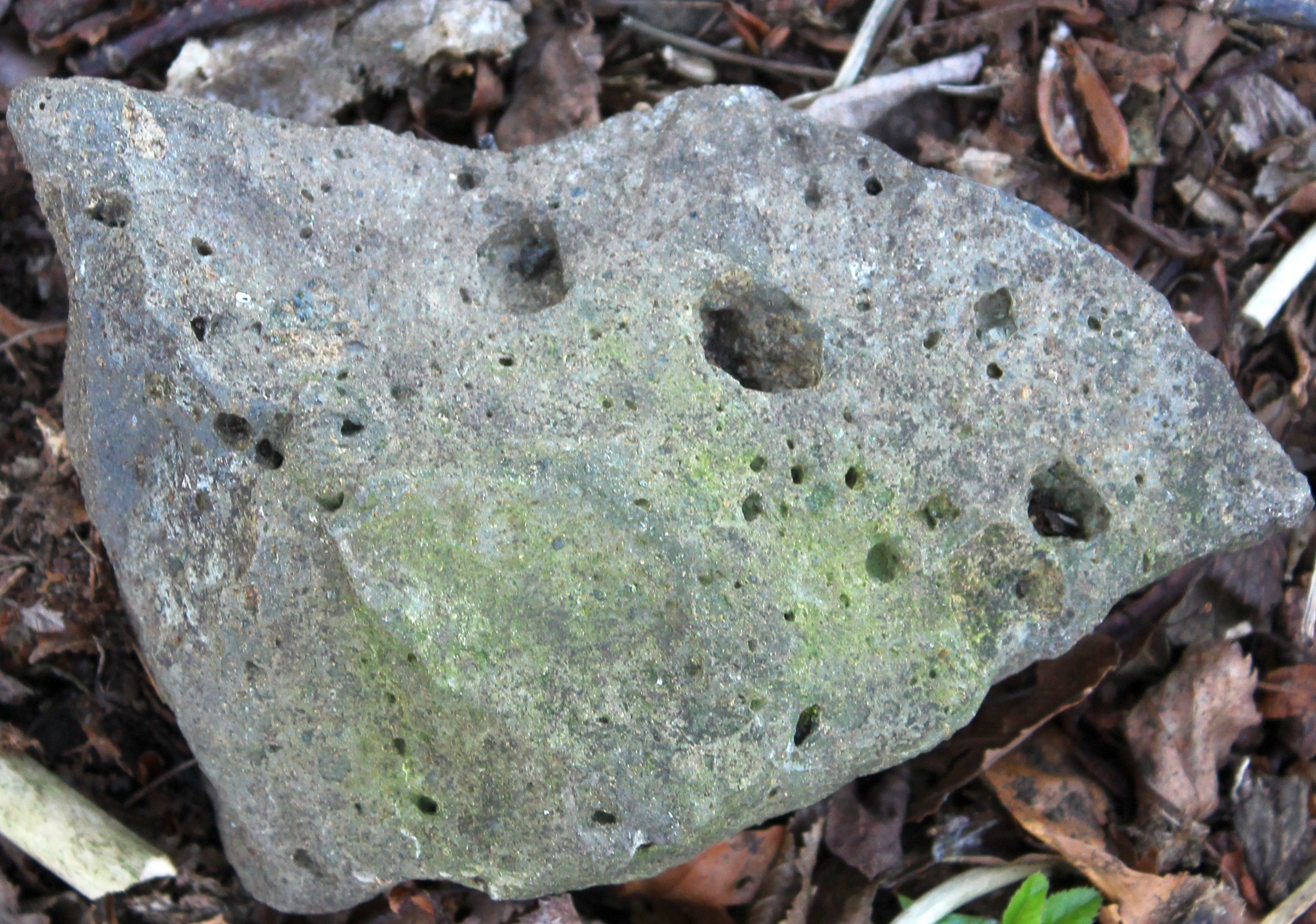
Sample of basalt from the top of Lotterberg. Note the cavities that were gas-filled vesicles which developed as the magma rose to the surface. At the top left is a distinct phenocryst of plagioclase.

On the west side of the Lotterberg is a deposit of loess, which formed after the last Quaternary glaciation.

== Flora ==
Lotterberg is covered by a mixed forest and is used for forestry. The rare Turk's cap lily grows on the summit. The plant is protected under German conservation law.

== History ==
There is evidence that the area around Lotterberg was populated at least from the Late Paleolithic onwards, as has been shown for the Felsberg area in general, e.g. by the existence of the Rhünda Skull. A single find of an asymmetrical, facetted, Neolithic axe on Lotterberg collaborates this.

Time passes in Hessen, in Gutensberg,
With hill-top and evening holds me up,
Tiny observer of enormous world.

— W. H. Auden 1929

In 1921 the Hessische Landesamt für Bodendenkmal (Hessian county office for ground monuments) opened up a number of tumuli of Funnelbeaker culture age (c. 4300 BC–c. 2800 BC) in the area around Amselholz (see below). Above the normal soil layer was a very stony layer. The graves were filled with pure sand. Two spotted flintstones were found.

An urnfield of possibly Bronze Age has been found on Lotterberg. In addition, there was probably an Iron Age settlement on Lotterberg from the 4th to the 1st centuries BC. Remains of the settlement cannot be found, but archeologists have found a large number of Iron Age pottery fragments. They are layered and contain grains of quartz. The pieces of ceramic are coloured either yellow or grey-brown. A Roman mortarium was also found on Lotterberg.

In 1929, the American–British poet W. H. Auden traveled from Berlin to Marburg via Kassel. In his poem 1929, the hill-top he mentions is Lotterberg, as part of the Gudensberger Basaltkuppenlandschaft (basalt hill landscape of Gudensberg).

== Amselhof ==
The 'Amselhof' (blackbird courtyard), also known as 'Hof zur Amsel' (courtyard to (the) blackbird), is a free-standing farm, which was once a guesthouse, on the eastern side of Lotterberg, on the edge of the forest. A mediaeval ridgeway that passed by Amselhof on the way to Kassel does not exist anymore.

In 1539 the term Amenschebnborg was first mentioned in a Kassel register, the Kasseler Salbuch, as part of Wolfenhausen's arable land. Amselburg is mentioned in 1558 to be on Lotterberg. The forest that belonged to Amselhof, Amselwald, is ascribed in 1579 as being used by villagers from Haldorf. In the archives of Marburg the 1694 cadastre for Wolfershausen and the related map of the village from 1688 does not show Amselhof, but it mentions that the oldest building of the guesthouse were built between 1694 and 1748. To begin with the guesthouse is mentioned, but not named in the cadastre from this time. At the end of the 17th century, the land lot is referred to as Amselburg.

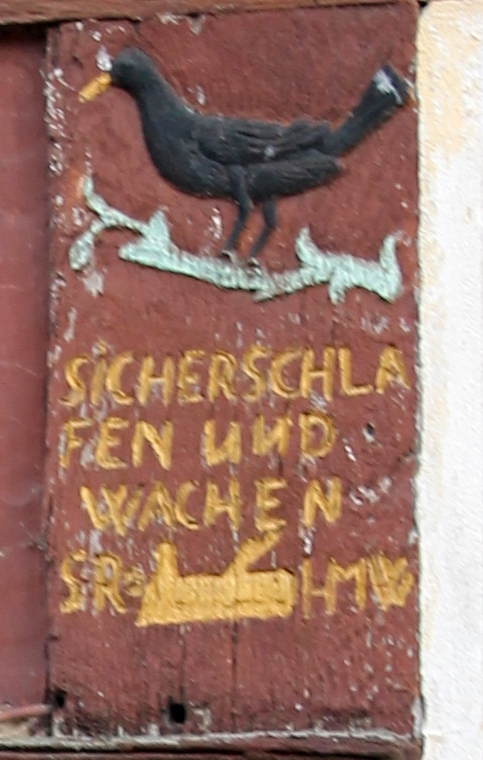
The carving of a blackbird above the front door of the Amselhof house. The words "Sicherschlafen und wachen" translate as "Sleep and wake safely."

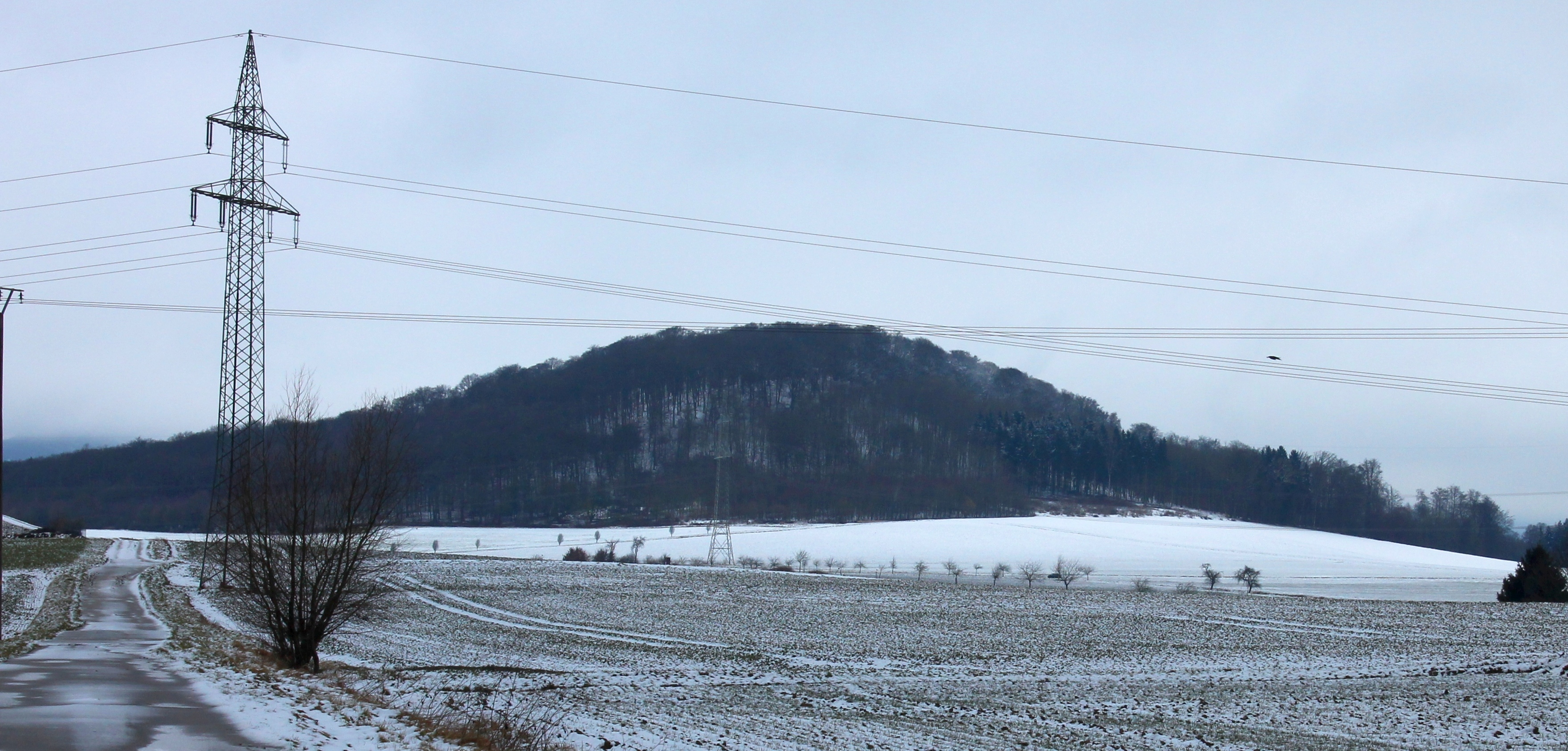
View of Lotterberg from the east in winter

The present-day half-timbered house with sandstone foundations was constructed by master craftsman Johann Hermann Alheit in 1776 from the wood of the previous house. Above the door, on the righthand oak beam, there is carving of a blackbird on a branch (see image on the right). In the first half of the 18th century Johannes Umbach ran a guesthouse at the Amselhof. In 1932 Konrad Dittmar took over the 27 morgen [approx. 15 ha] of arable and forestland at Amselhof and later passed it on to his son, Karl Dittmar. At the Amselhof, up until the 1970s, one felt one was back in the 19th century, because there was no electricity, running water, or telephone. Instead, the inhabitants of Amselhof used paraffin lamps in the evenings.

The Amselhof was the setting for the book Das rote Haus – eine Erzählung aus Hessen (The red house — a story from Hesse), written in 1933 by Wilhelm Ide (born 18 February 1887 in Kassel; diede 18 July 1963 in Marburg).

== Horses' grave ==
In the area of Amselholz on Lotterberg, close to Amselhof, there is a horses' grave. The romantic grave made of red sandstone has a decoration of two horses' heads. Engraved in the stone are the words, Hier ruhen Bella und Rosa, den 15ten Juni 1868 (Here lie Bella and Rosa, 15 June 1856). The horses buried here, are not, as was thought for a long time, from the Isabellen - a harnessed team of six belonging to the last Hessian Prince-elector, Friedrich Wilhelm I. Nevertheless, there are still two different stories about how the graves came to be.

In the first story, the two horses drew a carriage in which a hunter from Kassel often used to travel to his hunting ground in Amselwald on Lotterberg. One day, the old horses were not up to the effort anymore and the hunter, so that the horses wouldn't fall into other hands, shot them in Amselholz on 15 June 1856.

In the second story, the horses were two gray horses that belonged to the widow Biermann from Kassel. When the animals were old and could not pull the carriage anymore, the widow tried to give the horses to a farmer, who should put them up for stud. Because her request was turned down, she gave a hunting guest, a Rittmeister, instructions to shoot the 12- and 13-year-old horses in Amselholz.

== Legend ==
There was a giant who lived on Lotterberg called Lothar. Because the giant Kunibert had stole Lothar's beloved, the giantess Nagathe, and tried to take her back to Heiligenberg (a nearby hill), Lothar threw a huge block of stone at him. The throw went wrong and the stone landed in the field next to the Eder river, where it can still be seen today as the Riesenstein, close to Wolfershausen.
