= Riesenstein (Wolfershausen) =

Megalith in Hesse, Germany

- Riesenstein
- Giant's Stone
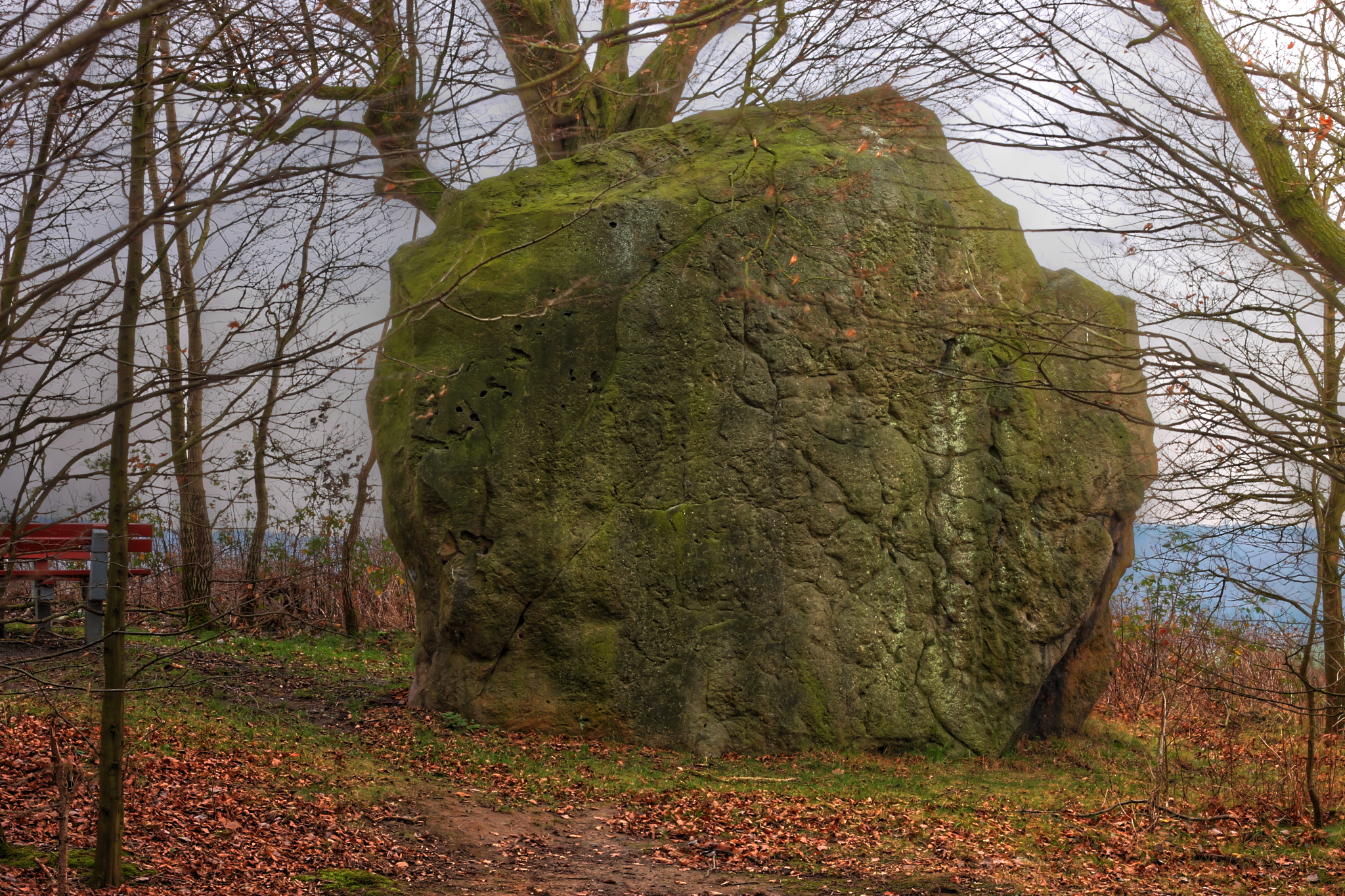
- The megalith Riesenstein from the north. HDR Image

- Location within Hesse
- 51°11′33″N 09°26′39″E
- Type: megalith
- Location: Wolfershausen, Hesse, Germany

History
- Built: earlier than 3000 B.C.

Site notes
- Material: Tertiary quartzite
- Length: 4.6 m (15 ft)
- Public access: yes

The Riesenstein (English: giant's stone) is a megalith or menhir, which is situated close to the village of Wolfershausen. It is the largest megalith in the district of Schwalm-Eder-Kreis, Hesse, Germany.

== Location ==
The Riesenstein is located 1.14 km (0.71 mi) directly north of the village of Wolfershausen. It can be reached from a tarmacked road north of the railway bridge, where it is signposted. It is located on the south-eastern corner of a small woodland. The megalith is also close to the eastern bank of the Eder River, which is just 180 m (590 ft) away (over the railway).

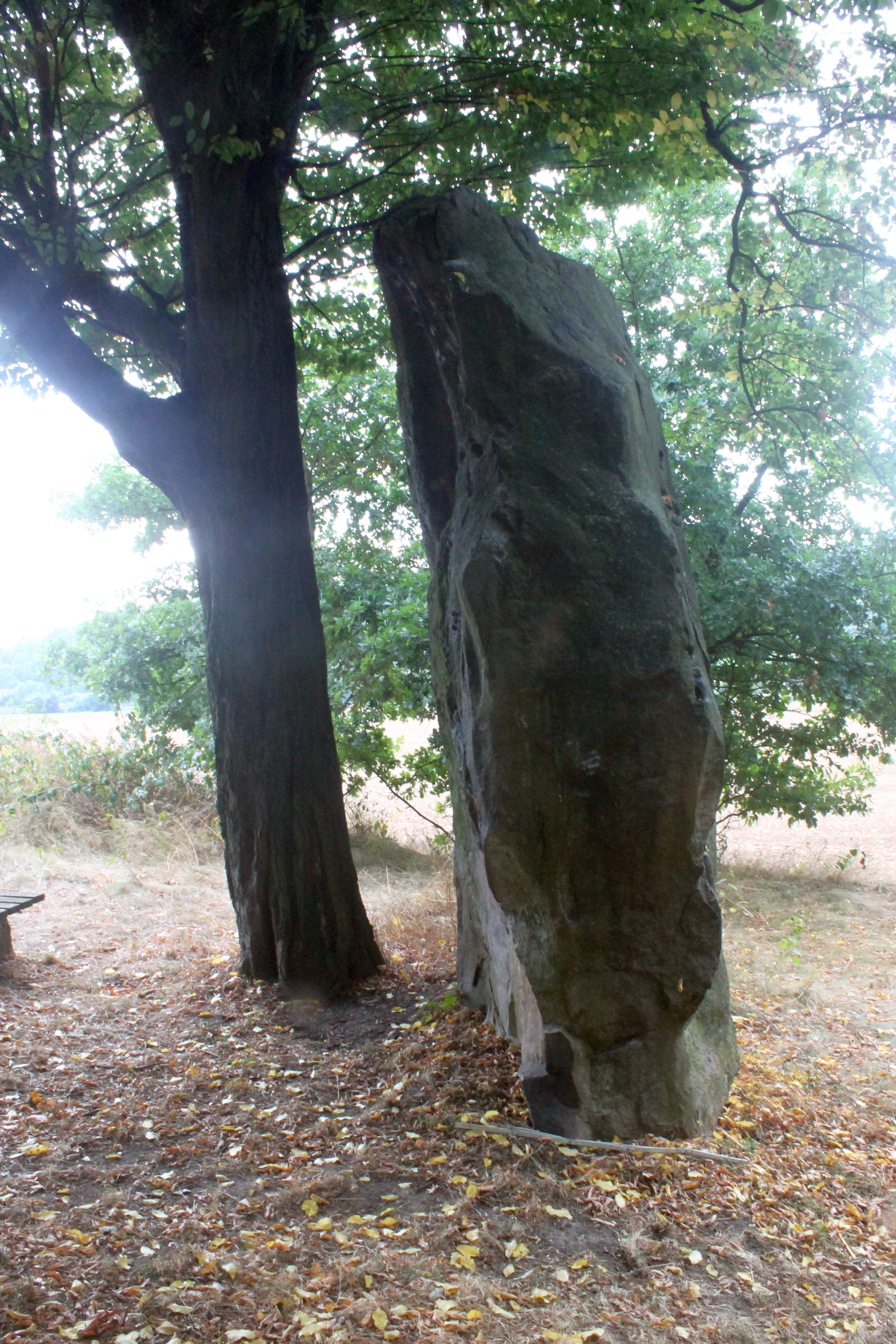
Side view of the Riesenstein megalith

== Composition, Dimensions, and Geometry ==
Riesenstein is composed of Neogene Miocene (from 23 million years ago to 8 million years ago) quartzite. In contrast to quartzites produced by metamorphism, the Tertiary sedimentary quartzites were the product of intense weathering of local Triassic Buntsandstein sandstones in a tropical climate. This entailed bleaching of sandstone and silicification by movement of silica-saturated groundwater through the strata. Consequently, the rock is practically made completely of quartz, with very little porosity.

The megalith has an oblate rectangular cuboid shape. It has a maximum height of 4.7 m (15 ft), a maximum width of 4.6 m (15 ft), and it is approximately 1 m (3 ft 3 in) thick. A rough estimate of the surface area of the flat large side is 14 m^{2} (150 sq ft). Hence the Riesenstein has an above-ground volume of ca. 14 m^{3} (490 cu ft). Quartzite is composed wholly of quartz, which has a density of 2,648 kg/m^{3} (4,463 lb/cu yd). Therefore, the above-ground mass of the stone is ca. 37 metric tons (36 long tons). For comparison, the sarsen (also a kind of silicified sandstone that resulted from Cenozoic acid leaching) stones of Stonehenge only weigh ca. 7 metric tons (6.9 long tons).

The weak, originally-horizontal bedding planes of the quartzite are now vertical, which rules out the stone being in a natural position. Furthermore, the surrounding area (in the wood) is covered with small blocks of quartzite, as are many other nearby hills, proving that Tertiary quartzite outcrops or is close to the surface in these places. Riesenstein is therefore unlikely to have been transported far, if at all.

== History ==
Archeological digs found neolithic human remains at the base of the megalith, proving the stone was in use approximately 3000 yrs B.C.

In 1615 the megalith was first referred to in documents as "Großer Stein" (English: large stone).

In 1986 Riesenstein became a German natural monument.

== Legends ==
Two legends are connected with the Riesenstein.

In the wide floodplain [of the Eder River], monks and men from the neighbouring villages built a large monastery. The building took a long time. Finally the Breitenau Monastery was finished and pious monks' song could be heard mixed with the first chimes of the monastery bells. For a long time a malicious giant on the Lotterberg hill had been watching the festivities. Now he couldn't hold back his anger and hate any more. He ripped up a huge rock and threw it with all his might at the monastery to reduce it to rubble. But in his haste he threw wrongly and the stone dropped before it passed the Ellenberg hill on the other side of the Eder River. The stone is still present and admonishes future generations to past events.

In a different story, two male giants had a fight over the giantess Nagathe, because they were both in love with her. Nagathe had moved in with the Giant Lothar on Lotterberg, but his rival Kunibert wouldn't accept this. Kunibert left his home at Heiligenberg and kidnapped Nagathe in front of Lothar. In a mad fury Lothar threw a large stone at his disappearing rival, but he missed and the stone was rammed into the soft ground. Because this story was often told, the stone was given the name "giant's stone".
