= Mainz-Hessian War =

Military conflict

The Mainz-Hessian War of 1427 was the final military conflict in the two-century long dispute between the Archdiocese of Mainz and Landgrave of Hesse over supremacy of the Hesse region. The decisive victories of Louis I, Landgrave of Hesse over the Mainzian military leader Gottfried von Leiningen near Fritzlar and over Archbishop Konrad von Dhaun near Fulda spelled the end of Mainz's ambitions in the Hesse region. The Peace of Frankfurt, signed on December 8, 1427, decisively ended both the war and the long-standing power struggle between Hesse and Mainz.

== Background ==
Previous causes of dispute between Hesse and Mainz included control over the villages within the Reinhardswald, the Lippoldsberg and Helmarshausen monasteries, and the rights to the city of Wetter. From 1425 onward, mutual interference in the affairs of the Fulda Abbey and controversial deals with Count Henry VII and Wolrad I of Waldeck brought tensions to a breaking point. Attempts to defuse the situation by other princes were unsuccessful, and open war broke out between the two states in 1427.

=== Fulda ===
For most of the 14th and early 15th century, the abbey of Fulda was heavily in debt due to both feuds with secular lords and knights as well as a devastating fire in 1398. In addition, their current abbot, Johann I von Merlau, fell ill in 1419. With the abbot ailing, the collegiate chapter, under pressure from the new Archbishop of Mainz, Konrad von Dhaun, appointed Hermann II von Buchenau as coadjutor and administrator. This decision quickly led to a clash between Abbot Johann, who insisted on preserving his rights as abbot of Fulda, and the new coadjutor. Johann was attacked by Hermann at Neuhof Castle in 1420 and expelled to the village of Ottershausen (?). Johann attempted to petition Archbishop Konrad and Bishop Johann II of Würzburg for aid, but the two ignored his petition, instead appointing Eberhard von Buchenau, a relative of the coadjutor, as their senior bailiff in Fulda. Mainz's interference in Fulda posed a serious threat to the Hessian Landgrave Ludwig I, as Fulda and the Buchenauers closeness to Mainz raised the possibility of Fulda securing independence from Hesse through Mainz. In addition, Hermann von Buchenauer had pawned important Fuldan and Buchonian castles to Mainz to pay down Fulda's debt. In 1425, Abbot Johann was finally expelled from Fulda; he would then seek refuge with Landgrave Ludwig.

=== Waldeck ===
Count Heinrich VII von Waldeck, who had become a Mainzian Lehnsmann in June 1400 after the murder of Duke Friedrich von Braunschweig and Lüneburg, along with his son, Wolrad I, pledged half of his county to Landgrave Ludwig for 22,00 guilders for life in 1424. Ludwig had already paid the sum and received the corresponding homage, but after Wolrad and his mother, Margaretha von Nassau-Wiesbaden, met with Archbishop Konrad of Mainz and the Archbishop of Cologne and administrator of Paderborn, Dietrich II von Moers, Wolfrad and his father made a dramatic reversal of policy. Citing a promise made earlier to the Archbishop of Mainz, Heinrich and Wolrad revoked their contract with Landgrave Ludwig in 1462 and pledged half of their county to Archbishop Konrad for 18,000 guilders and opened their castles to him and the Archbishop of Cologne. Archbishop Konrad offered to reimburse the Landgrave for the deposit of 22,000 guilders he had paid to the Waldecks, but Ludwig refused the offer. This sudden change of course only worsened the tensions between Hesse and Mainz.

== War of 1427 ==
In the early summer of 1427, Count Gottfried von Leiningen, a nephew of Archbishop Konrad, assembled a large company of knights in Fritzlar before advancing into Lower Hesse, where the Mainzian troops would loot the countryside. Landgrave Ludwig responded to this challenge by amassing his own army of knights and infantry in Gudensberg and devastating the fields and gardens of Mainz and Fritzlar. On July 21, after Ludwig had rejected Archbishop Konrad's offer to pay the Waldecks deposit, Gottfried reinforced his army with 600 horsemen and additional foot soldiers before launching a campaign of devastation against the Hessian towns of Gudensberg, Felsburg, and Melsungen. Over the course of this campaign, the villages of Geismar, Haddamar, Heimarshausen, Werkel, Wehern, Lohne, and Balhorn were looted and burned down. On July 23, just as the Mainzers were looting and burning down the village of Udenborn, Landgrave Ludwig's relief force moved across the Eder river between Obermöllrich and Zennern and pushed the Mainzer forces onto an open field on the Großenengliser Platte, just south of Fritzler, where they inflicted a heavy defeat upon them. After further defeats, Gottfried and his contingent fled first to Mainz and then Fulda. Near Fulda, Archbishop Konrad had already assembled a second army to defend the Hochstift and the city of Fulda. However, when Hessian troops approached Fulda, both the city and the abbey refused to grant the Mainzers protection within their walls due to the Archbishop's repeated interference in their internal affairs. On August 3, Landgrave Ludwig marched on Fulda, capturing the city and chasing out both the coadjutor and senior bailiff and reinstating Johann von Merlau as Abbot. When Archbishop Konrad refused to open the occupied Fuldian castles to the Hessians, resulting in a battle on August 10, 1427, on the Münsterfeld just west of Fulda. This battle ended as a victory for the Landgrave, and while the Archbishop managed to escape, around 300 knights from Mainz were captured by the Hessian forces.

== Aftermath ==
After negotiations in Frankfurt that lasted two days, Archbishop Konrad signed a peace treaty with Langrave Ludwig on December 8, 1427. The Peace of Frankfurt, as it become known, ended the long struggle between Hesse and Mainz, cementing Hessian dominance over the region. Mainz paid 44,000 guilders in compensation for war damages and lost almost all of its territory in Lower and Central Hesse to the Landgrave, with the exception of Fritzlar, Naumburg, Amöneburg, and Neustadt. Landgrave Ludwig returned the Waldecks pledged territory in return for a refund of the pledge sum and became a pledge partner of the Fulda towns and castles, including Hünfeld, Lauterbach, Fischberg Castle, Brückenau, Schildeck, Rockenstuhl and Geisa, which had previously been pledged to Mainz.
