= Bramer =

Bramer is a surname. Notable people with the surname include:

- Benjamin Bramer (1588–1652), German mathematician, architect, inventor, and adviser
- Leonaert Bramer, Dutch artist
- Shannon Bramer (b. 1973), Canadian poet

== See also ==
- Jimmy Van Bramer (b. 1969), American politician
