= Dietrich Schenk von Erbach =

Archbishop-Elector of Mainz

- Archbishop-Elector of Mainz
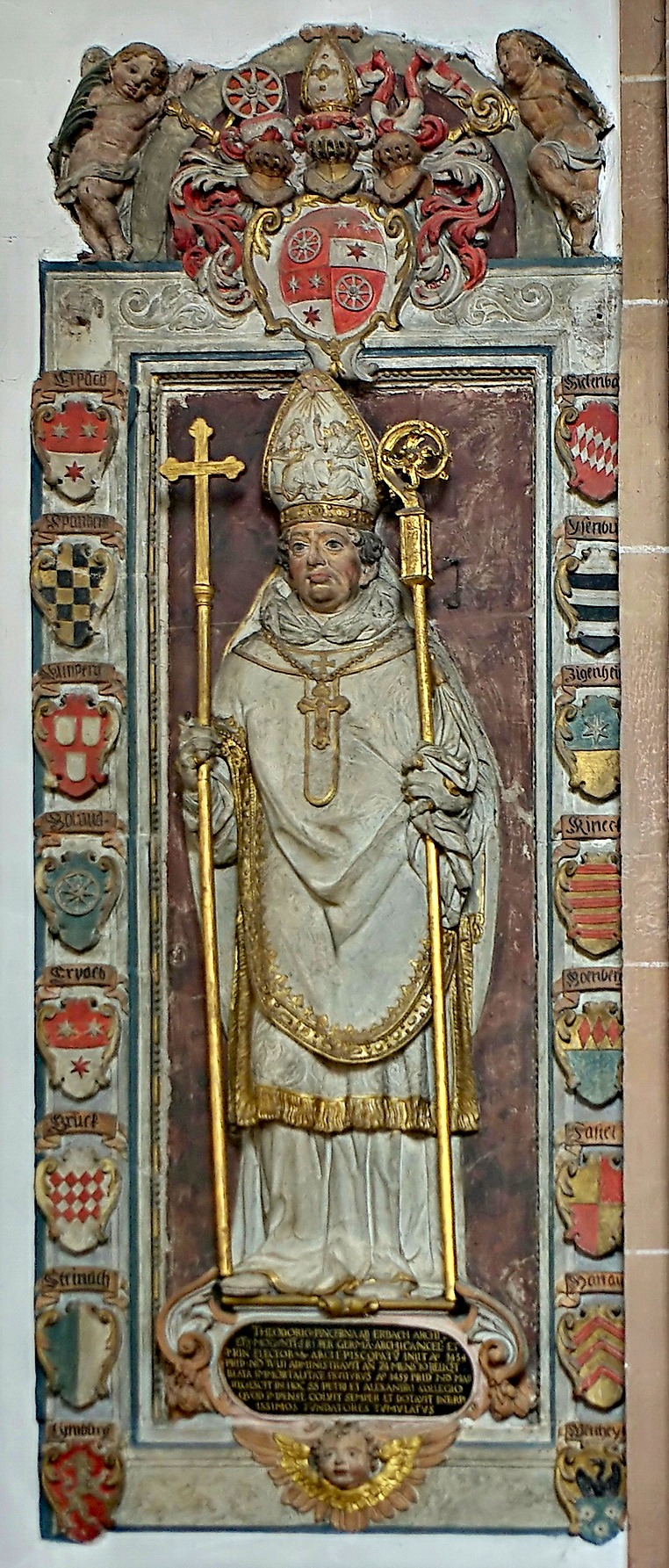
- Statue of Archbishop Dietrich Schenk von Erbach, from his tomb in Aschaffenburg.
- Church: Catholic Church
- Archdiocese: Mainz
- In office: 1434–1459
- Predecessor: Conrad III of Dhaun
- Successor: Diether von Isenburg

Personal details
- Born: c. 1390
- Died: 6 May 1459

Dietrich Schenk von Erbach (c. 1390 – 4 May 1459) was a German nobleman who served as Archbishop and Elector of Mainz from 1434 until his death in 1459.

== Biography ==
Dietrich was a son of Arch-Cupbearer Eberhard VI of Erbach. He was a member of the cathedral chapter of Mainz when on 6 July 1434 he was elected its archbishop. Theodoric was confirmed by Pope Eugene IV on 20 October. At the Council of Basel Theodoric maintained a neutral position and tried to mediate between both sides. In 1439 he managed to get all the German princes and the King to recognise Eugene as the legal pope.

He commissioned the printing of the Mainz Psalter.

Theodoric died in Aschaffenburg in 1459.

Dietrich Schenk von Erbach Erzschenken von Erbach Born: c. 1390 Died: 4 May 1459
Catholic Church titles
Preceded by Conrad III	Archbishop-Elector of Mainz; 1434–1459	Succeeded by Dieter von Isenburg
