= Eppenberg Charterhouse =

Coordinates: 51°08′39″N 9°27′51″E

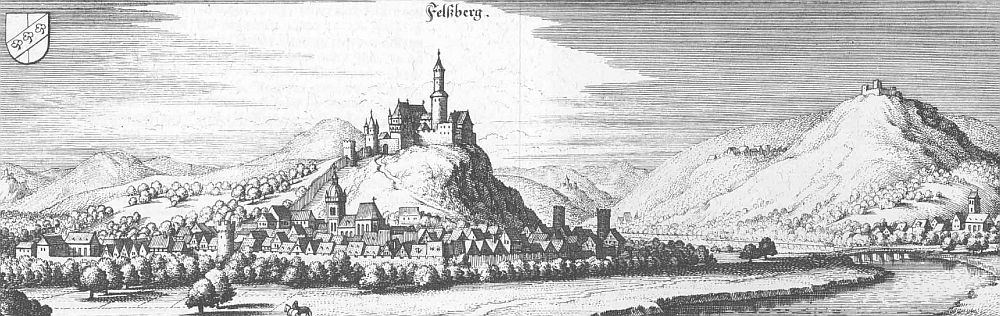
Felsberg (centre), Heiligenberg (right, to the front), Eppenberg Charterhouse (right, to the back): engraving from Topographia Germaniae by Matthäus Merian the younger, 1655

Eppenberg Charterhouse (German: Kartause Eppenberg) was a charterhouse, or Carthusian monastery, now a ruin, situated on the Eppenberg next to the Heiligenberg in Gensungen, now part of Felsberg in Hesse, Germany. It was established to replace a failing monastery of Premonstratensian canonesses.

== History ==
=== Premonstratensian priory ===
About 1217 the canonesses of Ahnaberg Priory near Kassel were permitted to establish a daughter-house on the Eppenberg, on the shoulder of the Heiligenberg. This foundation was confirmed on 3 March 1219 by Siegfried II, Archbishop of Mainz, who took it under his protection. The total number of canonesses in Ahnaberg was set at 40, and the remainder moved to a newly established daughter-house at Eppenberg.

The relationship of the new priory to its mother house was clearly not without friction. In 1223 the provost and community of Ahnaberg re-stated their rights in Eppenberg. On 17 February 1224 Archbishop Siegfried once more confirmed the rights of Ahnaberg Priory. But in 1250, for reasons now unknown, the prioress of Eppenberg openly rejected the rights of Ahnaberg, and Eppenberg, like Ahnaberg itself, became an independent house under the supervision and protection of Spieskappel Abbey.

The newly independent priory rapidly flourished, mostly because of gifts and acquisitions of land in the nearby villages of Altenbrunslar, Böddiger, Besse and Gensungen. In 1269 Eppenberg was able to found a daughter-house at Homberg an der Efze. Growing prosperity however led to a decline in morals and discipline, and eventually to prodigality, mismanagement, and economic collapse.

=== Charterhouse ===
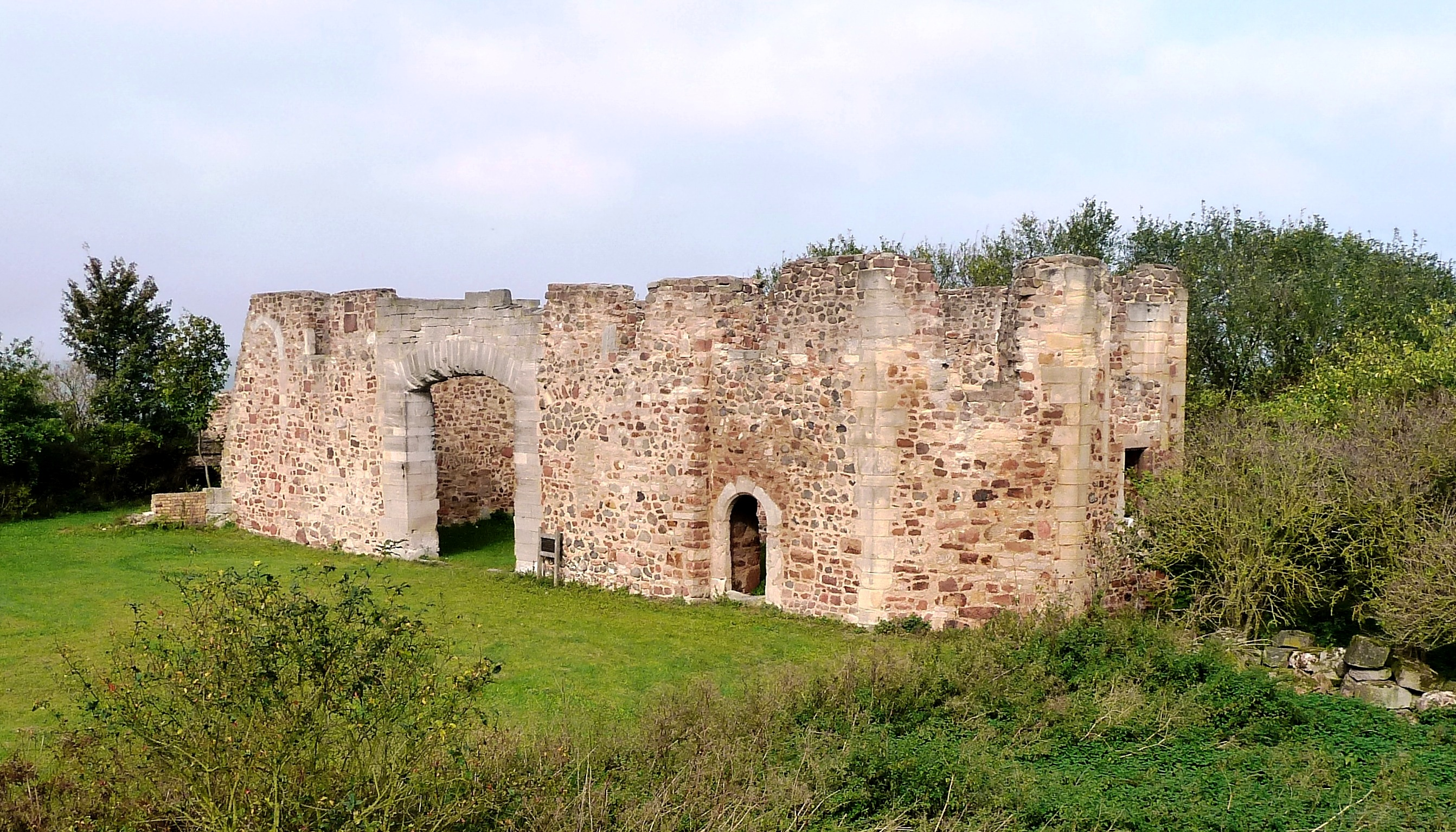
Ruins of the monastic church

Landgrave Ludwig I of Hesse, greatly offended at the conditions in the priory, the neglected estates and buildings, and the loss of discipline, rigour and order, obtained a papal bull in 1438 to dissolve the Premonstratensian priory and replaced it by a charterhouse, which was settled by hermits from Erfurt in 1440. The buildings were generously and extensively rebuilt for Carthusian use and re-dedicated to Saint John the Baptist. In 1471 Landgrave Ludwig II of Hesse gave the charterhouse the estate of Wimmenhof (now Domäne Mittelhof) and the nearby, half-derelict Heiligenburg Castle, on the condition that the monks should pray weekly in the castle chapel for his salvation.

=== Secularisation ===
In 1527, in the wake of the Synod of Homberg of 1526, which introduced the Protestant Reformation in Hesse, the monastery was dissolved and taken over by Landgrave Philip I of Hesse for use as a hunting lodge and farm. In about 1610 Landgrave Maurice of Hesse-Kassel had the hunting lodge remodelled in Italian Renaissance style. The buildings and lands were maintained by the nearby Mittelhof.

In the Thirty Years' War the building complex was mostly destroyed, and afterwards it became a subsidiary building and sheep-farm to the state-owned Domäne Mittelhof. In the Seven Years' War (1756–63) French troops were holed up there for seven weeks after losing the Battle of Grebenstein; two dugouts on the slopes of the Heiligenberg remain as a reminder of their camp.

== Present day ==
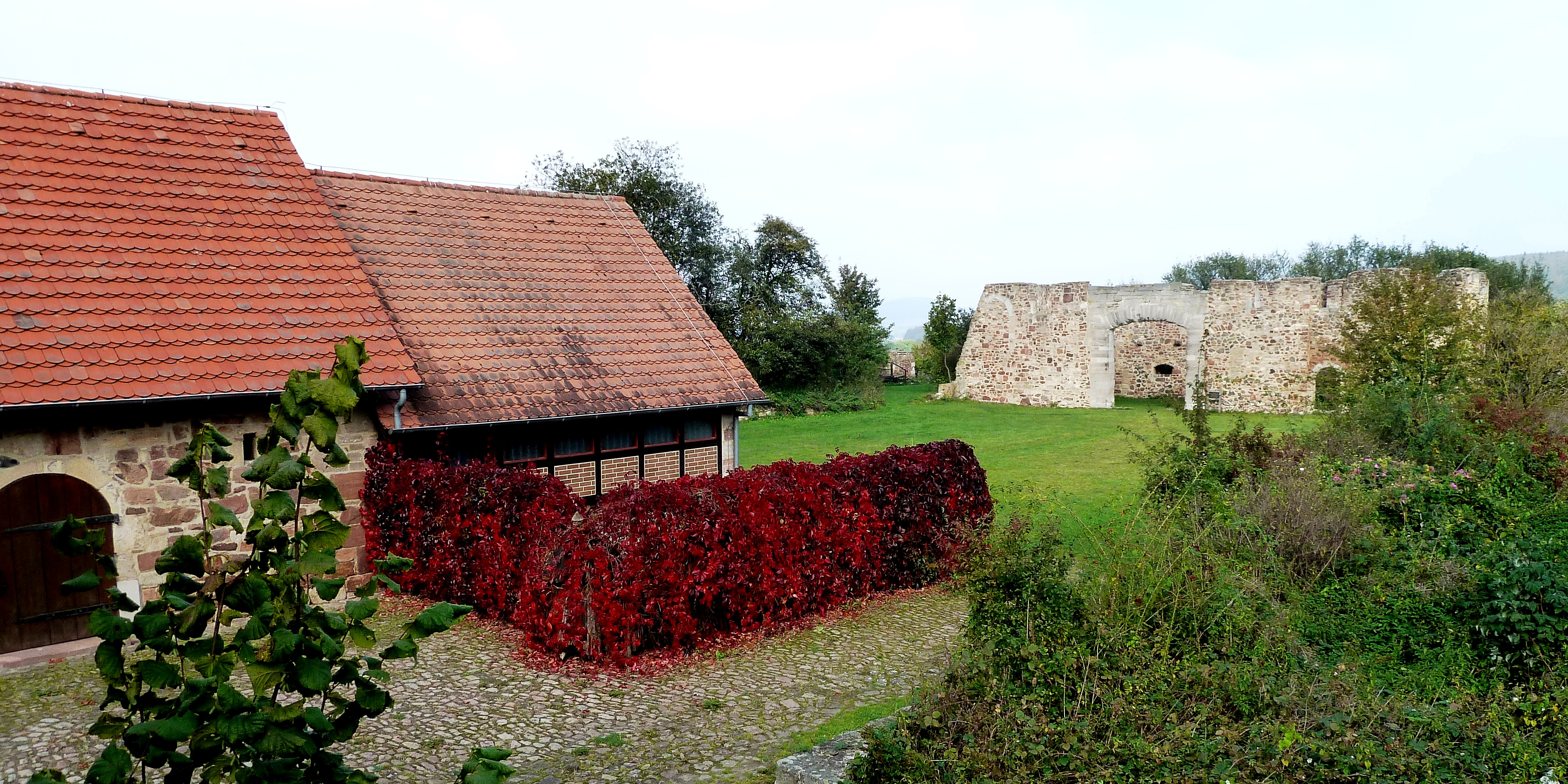
The former gatehouse, now the Museum of Bee-keeping

In 1957 the principal building was struck by lightning and burnt down, leaving only the bare walls. The claustral buildings and the monastery church fell increasingly into dereliction, until in 1984 the Bezirks-Imkerverein Felsberg ("Felsberg Beekeepers' Association") took on the task of restoring and caring for the site. In the former gatehouse they established a highly regarded museum of bee-keeping. Of the monastery itself the only remains are those of the church.

The area around the charterhouse site and the ruins themselves were declared a nature reserve in December 1988.

== See also ==
- Catholic Church in Germany
