= Egbert Hayessen =

German army officer and anti-Nazi resistance fighter (1913–1944)

Egbert Hayessen (28 December 1913 – 15 August 1944) was a German resistance fighter in the struggle against Adolf Hitler, and a major in the army.

Born in Eisleben, Hayessen grew up on the Hessian state domain of Mittelhof near Felsberg-Gensungen. In 1924, he went to Roßleben. There, in 1933 at the Roßleben Monastery School he did his Abitur. After his Abitur, Hayessen completed military training at Artillery Regiment no. 12 in Schwerin as a career officer and rose to major on the General Staff with General Friedrich Fromm, Commander-in-chief of the Reserve Army. Hayessen first learnt of the plot against Hitler and Operation Valkyrie on 15 July 1944 from Robert Bernardis. He turned away from National Socialism and took part in the attempt to assassinate Hitler at the Wolf's Lair in East Prussia on 20 July 1944, taking on the foreseen logistical connections between City Commandant Paul von Hase and Police President Wolf-Heinrich Graf von Helldorf. On the day of the attack, Egbert Hayessen brought Paul von Hase the news of General Fromm's arrest at headquarters on Bendlerstraße in Berlin. At the City Commandant's office, Hayessen then took part in the preparations to occupy the radio building in Berlin and to arrest Propaganda Minister Joseph Goebbels.

On 15 August 1944, Hayessen was sentenced to death by hanging at the Volksgerichtshof, and the sentence was carried out the same day at Plötzensee Prison in Berlin.

Egbert Hayessen is memorialized at the Plötzensee Memorial Centre. Furthermore, a plaque in memory of his act of conscience may be seen outside the Mittelhof near Gensungen.

== Literature ==
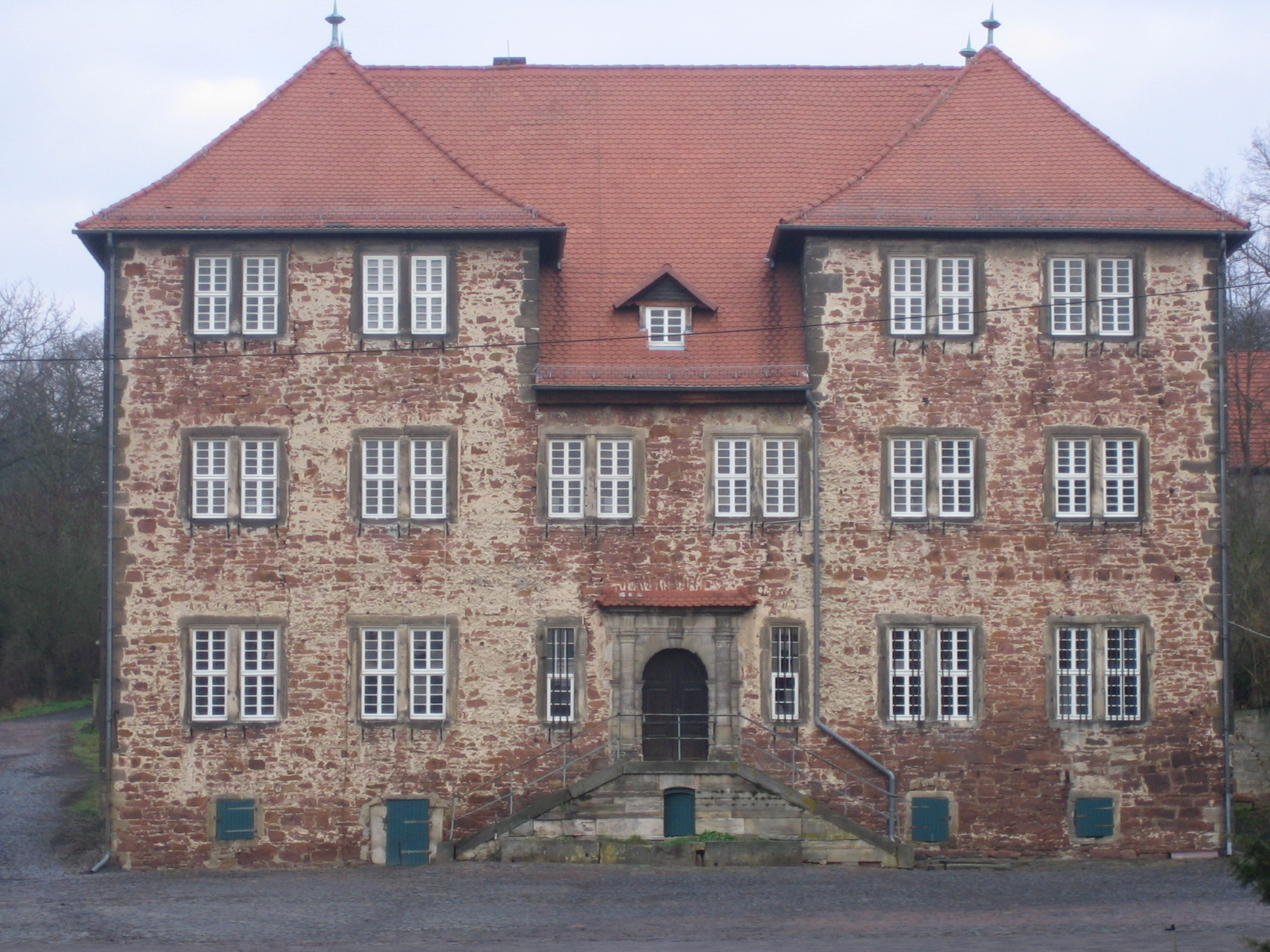
Staatsdomäne Mittelhof

- Plötzensee Memorial Centre Archive
