= Wolfershausen =

Village in Felsberg, Schwalm-Eder-Kreis, Germany

- Part of Felsberg
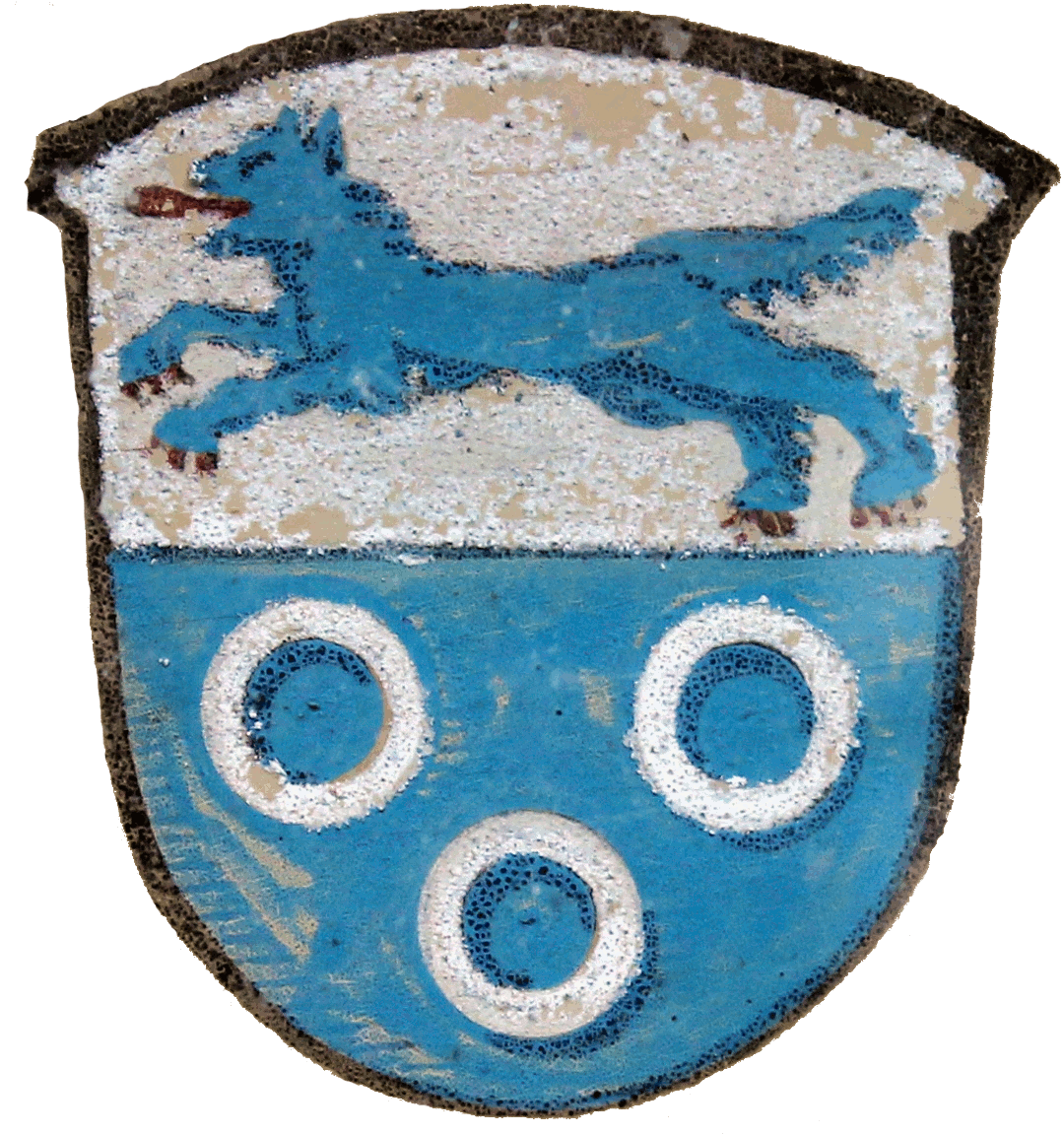
- Coat of arms
- Interactive map of Wolfershausen
- Location within Germany Location within Hesse
- Coordinates: 51°10′53″N 9°26′39″E
- Country: Germany
- State: Hesse
- District: Schwalm-Eder-Kreis
- Town: Felsberg

Government
  - Mayor: Jochen Hammerschick (SPD)

Area
  - Total: 3.69 km^{2} (1.42 sq mi)
- Elevation: 159–194 m (522–636 ft)

Population (2009-12-31)
  - Total: 760
  - Density: 210/km^{2} (530/sq mi)
- Time zone: UTC+01:00 (CET)
  - Summer (DST): UTC+02:00 (CEST)
- Postal codes: 34587
- Dialling codes: 05665
- Vehicle registration: HR

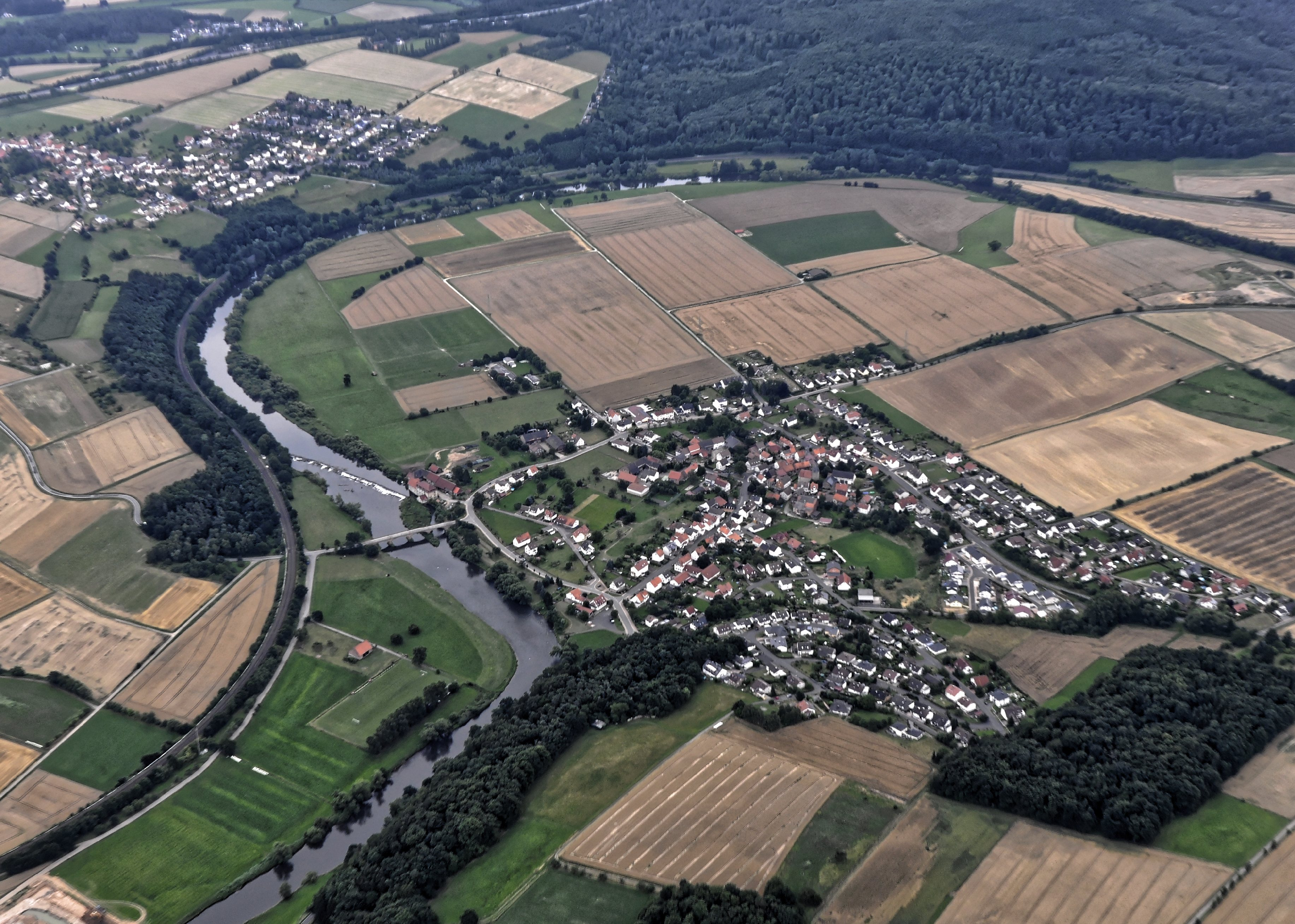
view from the north

Wolfershausen is one of the sixteen constituent communities that form the town of Felsberg in Schwalm-Eder-Kreis, North Hesse, Germany.

== Geography ==
The boundary of the village encompasses an area of about 3.7 km^{2} (1.4 sq mi), in which approximately 760 people live.

The village is situated on the western (cut) bank of the river Eder. To the west of the village is the Lotterberg, a volcano that was active in the Miocene and became extinct 7 million years ago. The Eder converges with the river Fulda just 4.5 km (2.8 mi) downstream at Edermünde.

== History ==
Wolfershausen was first mentioned in 1061 in a document from the Fulda monastery. The abbot, Widerad von Eppenstein, transferred the land and farm of a gentleman and his wife from Maden to a monastery at Morschen. In this exchange, the towns of Wolfeshuson, Hebel and Heßlar were involved. The gentry of Wolferhausen were liegemen, that is they were noblemen who were obliged to pay a tithe to the Saint Peter's Church in Fritzlar. In 1232 Landgrave Konrad von Thüringen attacked the town of Fritzlar. The knights from Wolfershausen were defending the Heiligenburg Castle, which was destroyed in the landgrave's attack. The Archbishop Siegfried III from Mainz gave the order for the castle to be rebuilt. This decision caused the nobles of Wolfershausen to transfer their allegiance to the Landgrave, which caused them great loss later on (for instance the loss of their castle). In fact, the nobles of Wolfershausen often transferred their loyalty to the side that brought them the most, many times over history.

The coat of arms for Wolfershausen originates from 1259. The shield is party per fess: upper — a wolf courant to dexter, armed and langued, lower — three annulets argent in pile on azure. The annulets in pile (stacked rings) signify the town of Rengshausen, a town in the community of Knüllwald, approximately 28 km (17 mi) south of Wolfershausen, from where the noble family originated. In 1273, the castle, which was built by the Wolfershausen noble family, was probably destroyed by soldiers from Fritzlar and never subsequently rebuilt.

In 1291 the town was mentioned as Wolfershusen and Wolfishusen. In 1357 the town was called Wolfartdeshusen. In 1465 the Breitenau Monastery (in Guxhagen) purchased the patronage of the church from the noble family von Löwenstein. In 1555 the town belonged to Felsberg, in 1585 it was administered by Kassel.

On 1 January 1972 the town joined the newly formed municipality of Brunslar. This was incorporated into the town of Felsberg on 1 January 1974.

== Church ==
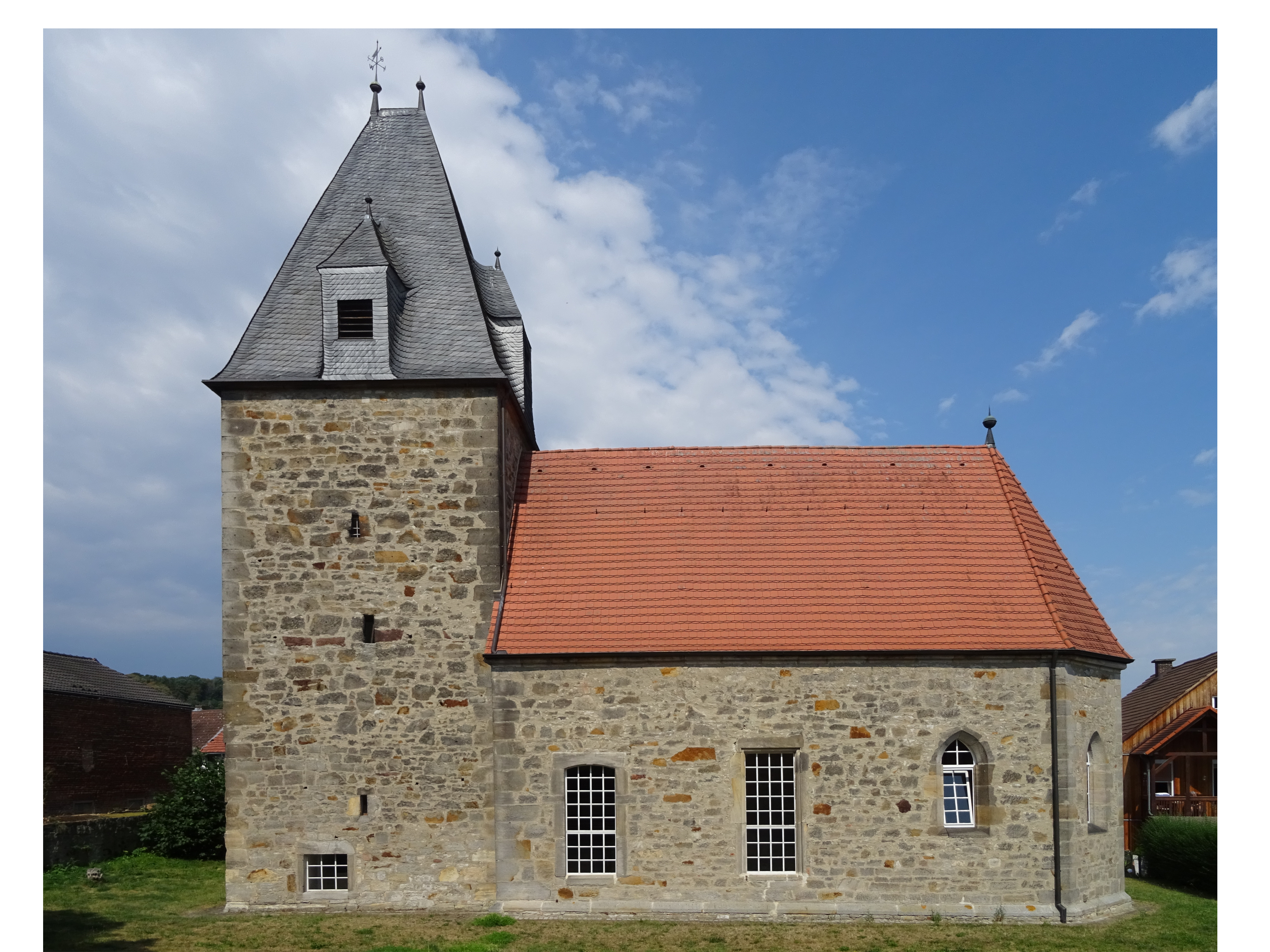
Protestant church

In the 13th century, after 1273, a fortified church, with a square tower, was built on the remains of the old castle. The present-day aisle was constructed in the Gothic art style around 1484.

== Monuments ==
- The menhir Riesenstein, 1.14 km to the north of the town.
- The Gothic art-style church.
