= Rhünda Skull =

Hominin fossil

Coordinates: 51.115488°N 9.406807°E

The Rhünda Skull
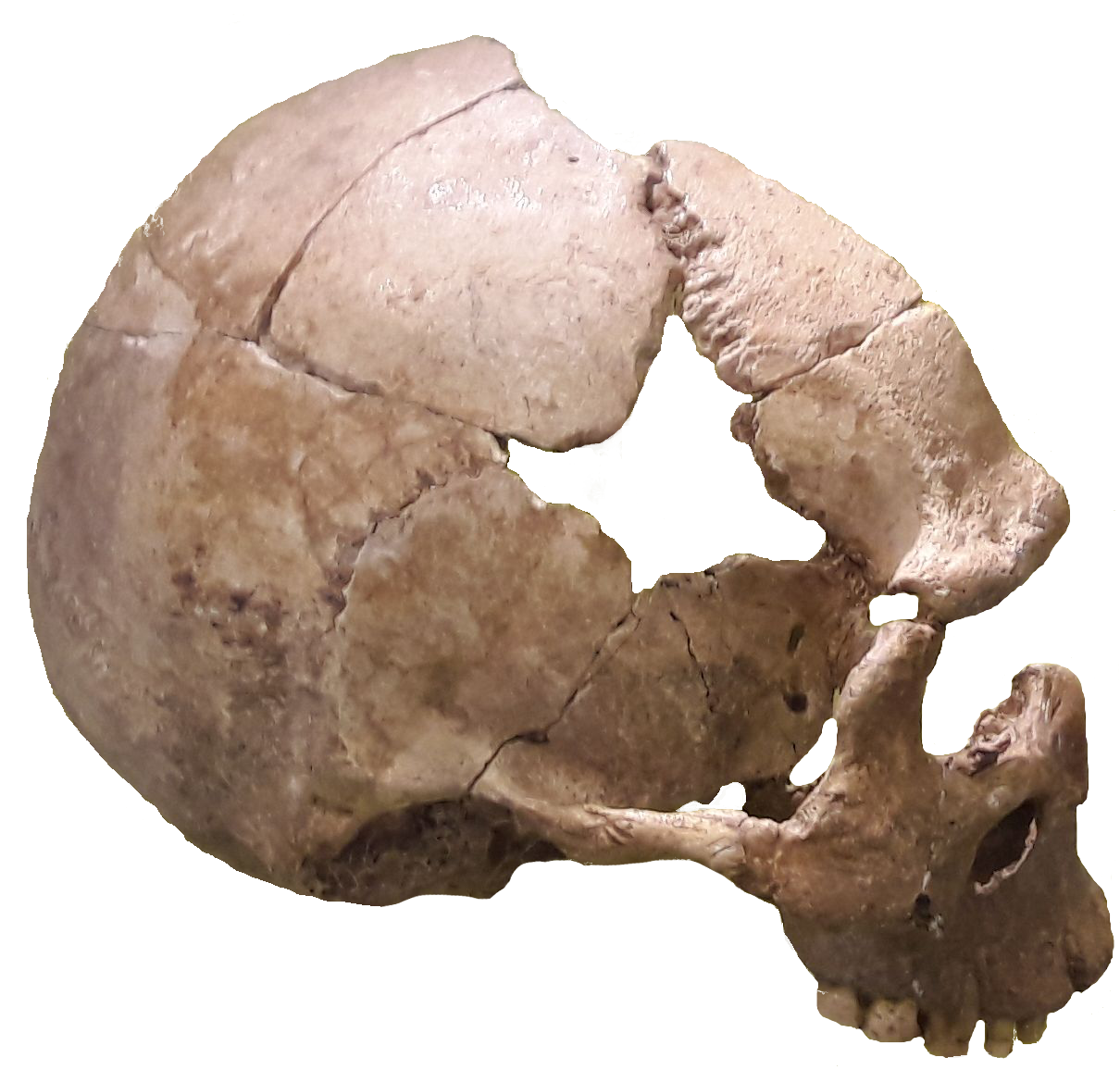
- Common name: The Rhünda Skull
- Species: homo sapiens sapiens
- Age: 12000 ± 80 years BP
- Place discovered: Rhünda in North Hesse, Germany
- Date discovered: 19 July 1956
- Discovered by: Eitel Glatzer

The Rhünda Skull is a fossil human skull that was found just outside the village of Rhünda in North Hesse, Germany. It is dated to the Magdalenian, about 12,000 years old.

== Discovery ==
On the night of 19 July 1956 there was a heavy storm in North Hessen. This caused the stream northwest of Rhünda, the Rhündabach, to strongly erode the field that is now the Rhünda sports ground. On the morning of 20 July, a villager found parts of a hominid skull in the newly-eroded stream bed, about 80 centimetres (31 in) below the ground surface. The skull pieces were covered in calcareous sinter and surrounded by lime-rich tuff, loess, and basalt fragments.

== History of Research ==
The find was passed on to Prof. Dr. Eduard Jacobshagen in the Department of Anatomy and Anthropology at the University of Marburg. On 26 August 1956, Prof. Jacobshagen presented his research at the international congress 'Hundert Jahre Neanderthaler: 1856–1956 [a century of Neanderthals]' in Düsseldorf. From his reconstruction of the skull, he postulated it belonged to the species Homo neanderthalensis, i.e. a Neanderthal. This would mean the fossil was 30,000 years old. Furthermore, he thought the bones belonged to a female.

Heberer and Kurth from Göttingen University reconstructed the skull again and carried out fluorine and ^{14}carbon dating on the surrounding material. They suggested that the skull belonged to a 'modern' homo sapiens sapiens. Together with the ^{14}carbon age of the calcareous sinter that surrounded the skull at 8,365 ± 100 BP, the owner of the skull was thus firmly believed to have lived in the late to early Preboreal. This correlates to the Mesolithic period.

In 2002 Wilfried Rosendahl sent 2 g of the skull to the Centre for Isotope Research (Centrum voor Isotopen Onderzoek) at the University of Groningen. Using the accelerator mass spectrometry ^{14}carbon method, they dated the sample at 10,000±80 years BP. After calibration (with INTCAL 98), this gave an age of 10,015–9,747 BP, which correlates to the Magdalenian-Azilian period, at the beginning of the European Mesolithic. They also showed that the skull belonged to a man.

The skull resides in the Museum of Hessian History in Kassel; there is a copy in the museum in Gensungen, close to Felsberg.
