= Wilhelm Wessel =

German publisher

Wilhelm Wessel was a German book publisher of the 17th century. Based in the town of Kassel, he published the Hessian Arms Book as well as the controversial Fama Fraternitatis.
