= Felsberg, Hesse =

Town in Schwalm-Eder-Kreis, Kassel, Germany

Felsberg
- Town
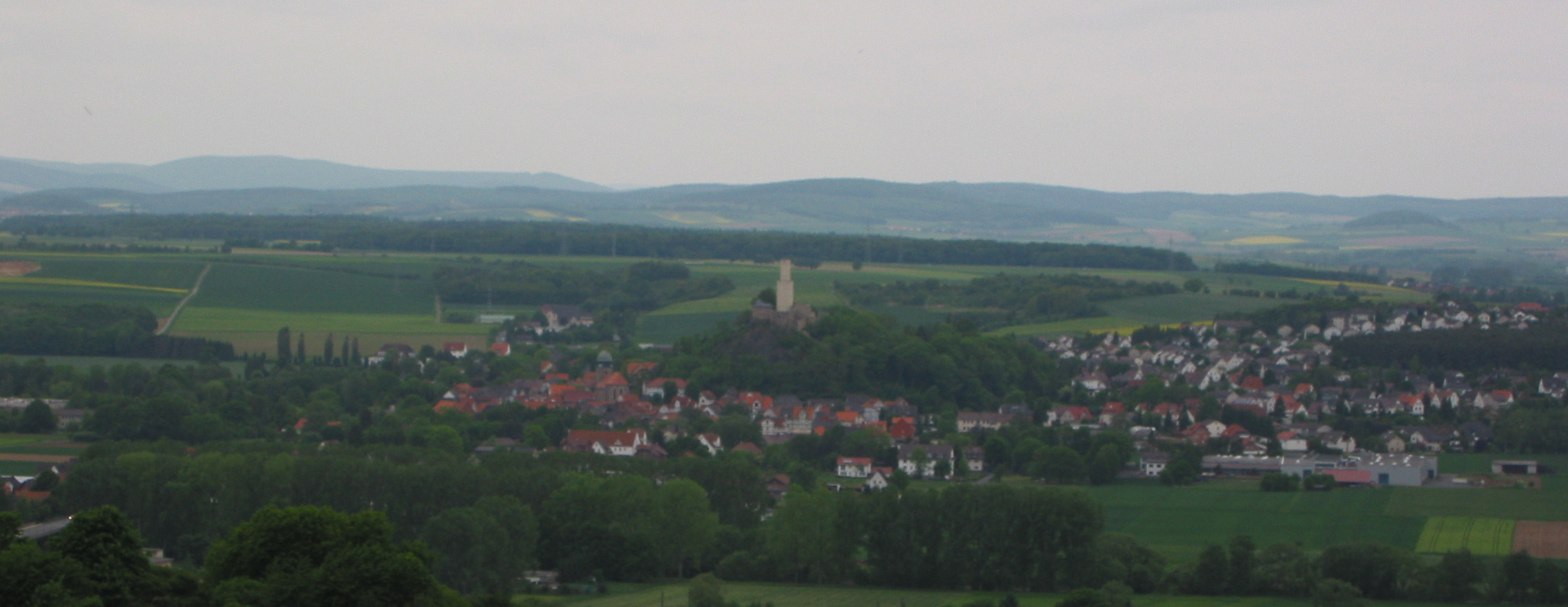
- Panorama of Felsberg

- Coat of arms

- Location of Felsberg within Schwalm-Eder-Kreis district
- Interactive map of Felsberg
- Location within Germany Location within Hesse
- Coordinates: 51°08′06″N 9°25′16″E
- Country: Germany
- State: Hesse
- Admin. region: Kassel
- District: Schwalm-Eder-Kreis

Government
  - Mayor (2019–25): Volker Steinmetz (Ind.)

Area
  - Total: 83.32 km^{2} (32.17 sq mi)
- Elevation: 162 m (531 ft)

Population (2025-12-31)
  - Total: 10,472
  - Density: 125.7/km^{2} (325.5/sq mi)
- Time zone: UTC+01:00 (CET)
  - Summer (DST): UTC+02:00 (CEST)
- Postal codes: 34587
- Dialling codes: 05662, 05665 (Wolfershausen), 05683 (Lohre)
- Vehicle registration: HR, FZ, MEG, ZIG
- Website: www.felsberg.de

Felsberg (German pronunciation: [ˈfɛlsˌbɛʁk]) is a town in the Schwalm-Eder district about 25 kilometres (16 miles) south of Kassel.

== Geography ==
The landscape around Felsberg is marked by hills and small lakes, as well as the remains of gravel quarrying. As part of the West Hesse Depression, it lies in a sunken area that was formed by volcanic activity in the Tertiary sub-era. The change from partly basaltic hills to smooth river valleys is striking. While the river valleys are covered by fluvial sediments, fertile loess beds can be found higher up. The river Eder flows through Felsberg's municipal area. Near Gensungen lies the Heiligenberg ("Holy Mountain") with the ruins of the Heiligenburg Castle.

=== Constituent communities ===
The town consists of 15 communities: Altenbrunslar, Altenburg, Beuern, Böddiger, Gensungen, Helmshausen, Hesserode, Heßlar, Hilgershausen, Lohre, Melgershausen, Neuenbrunslar, Niedervorschütz, Rhünda and Wolfershausen together with the historic Felsberg, to which the other, formerly independent, communities were amalgamated on 1 January 1974.

== History ==
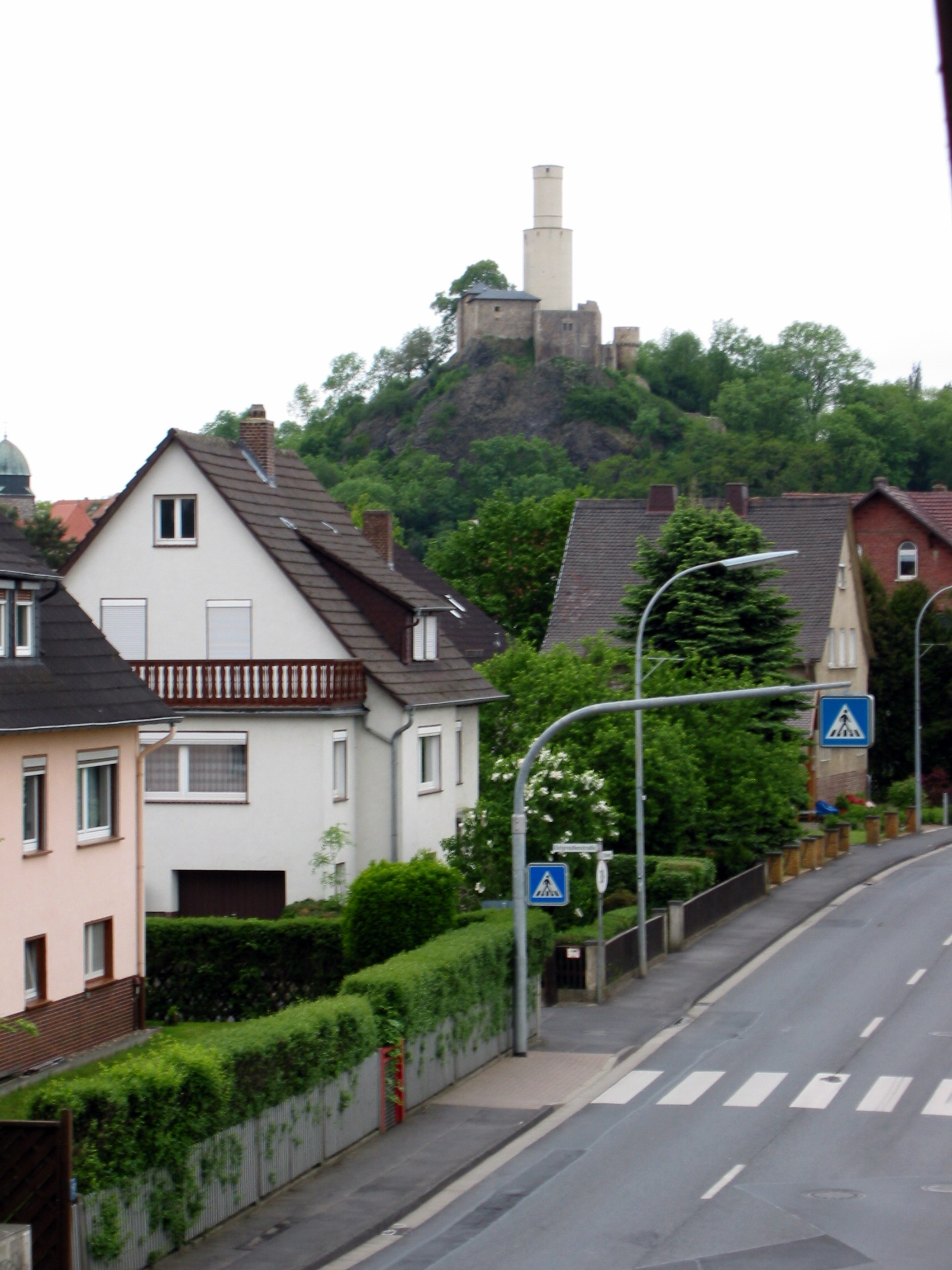
The Felsburg above Felsberg, with its soaring white tower

There were settlers in the Felsberg region, as long ago as the last ice age, as witnessed by the find of the 12,000-year-old, so-called Rhünda Skull. In the 1st Century AD, the Felsberg area was inhabited by the Chatti, a Germanic tribe. The only mention of the area from this time is a report by the Roman historian Tacitus about one of Germanicus's campaigns, when in the year 15 he destroyed Mattium (probably nowadays Maden), the Chatti's capital.

In the 8th Century, the Felsberg region was part of the Frankish Empire, and this is when the town was first mentioned in documents. It was also at this time that Christian missionary work was being carried out in the area by Saint Boniface, who in 723 felled Thor's Oak near Fritzlar, about 15 km (9 mi) west of Felsberg, thereby starting the Christianization of the peoples of northern Germany.

Within the town's municipal area lie the ruins of three castles; the Felsburg, the Altenburg, in the constituent community of the same name, and the Heiligenburg Castle, above the constituent community of Gensungen, on the river Eder's opposite bank. The town is thus sometimes known as the Drei-Burgen-Stadt ("Three-Castle Town"). The castles were built in the Middle Ages for their strategic locations, during the feud between the Archbishopric of Mainz and the Landgraviate of Thuringia, or Hesse. The Heiligenburg Castle belonged to Mainz. Both the Felsburg and the Altenburg, only 2 km (1 mi) apart, are distinguished by their butter-churn towers. The Salzstraße ("Salt Road") ran through Felsberg from the river Werra, where the salt was mined, to the Rhineland.

In 1090, Felsberg was mentioned in a Mainz document under the name Velisberc, and again under the same name in 1209 in a good's directory from the Petrus Estate in Fritzlar. Felsberg's first documentary mention as a town came in 1286. The historic town core was once surrounded by an 830m-long town wall, only parts of which are preserved today.

A house of Premonstratensian canonesses, the Eppenberg Priory, was established here in about 1217, on the Eppenberg in Gensungen. This was dissolved in 1438, and rebuilt as a Carthusian monastery, Eppenberg Charterhouse, which was secularised in 1527.

In 1526, Felsberg became Evangelical under Philip the Magnanimous, after a resolution by the Homberg Synod.

The Thirty Years' War brought widespread destruction to Felsberg.

In the Second World War, Felsberg was heavily damaged by aerial bombardment and the destruction of the Edertal Dam.

== Politics ==
The town council has 37 members. The last two municipal elections gave the following results:

Summary of Felsberg election results
	2006		2011	
Parties	Votes %	Seats	Votes %	Seats
Social Democratic Party (SPD)	53.9	20	50.3	19
Christian Democratic Union (CDU)	23.8	9	21.6	8
Alliance 90/The Greens	6.4	2	14.5	5
Free Democratic Party (FDP)	5.7	2	4.9	2
Free Voters (FWG)	5.0	2	4.4	2
Die Freien Bürger (DFB)	5.2	2	4.4	1
Total	100	37	100	37

Election 2011 Felsberg
SPD	50.3%
CDU	21.6%
B'90/GRÜNE	14.5%
FDP	4.9%
FWG	4.4%
DFB	4.4%

The town executive (Magistrat) consists of 14 councillors and the mayor. Of those, 8 seats are held by the SPD, 3 by the CDU and one seat each by the Alliance 90/The Greens, the FDP and the FWG.

The last three elected mayors were:

Mayors of Felsberg
Date elected	Name	Party	Percentage of votes
28 October 2001	Klaus Stiegel	SPD	85.2%
1 April 2008	Volker Steinmetz	Independent	67.6%
3 November 2013	Volker Steinmetz	Independent	73.6%

Klaus Stiegel was mayor of Felsberg for 24 years.

=== Coat of arms ===
The town's civic coat of arms has been known since 1570, when it was displayed at the Schloss Rotenburg (a stately home in Rotenburg an der Fulda, built by Landgrave Ludwig II in 1540). It was also published in the Hessisches Wappenbuch ("Hessian Arms Book") by Wilhelm Wessel in 1633.

Heraldically, the arms might be described thus: Party per pale gules and argent, thereover a bend sinister vert, therein three trefoils argent.

=== Town partnerships ===
Felsberg is twinned with the following towns:

- Vernouillet, France
- Cheddar, United Kingdom

It also has friendship agreements with these places:

- (Germany) Felsberg, a constituent community of Überherrn, Saarland
- Felsberg, Graubünden, Switzerland
- (Germany) Dingelstädt, Thuringia

== Personalities ==
- Benjamin Bramer (1588–1652), artist, architect, builder, geodesist, mathematician
- Egbert Hayessen, (1913–1944), resistance fighter against the Third Reich
- Harold Goldsmith, born Hans Goldschmidt (1930–2004), American Olympic foil and épée fencer
- Günter Böttcher (1954–2012), German handball player, coach and university lecturer
