= Benjamin Bramer =

- Born: February 15, 1588; Fesberg, Holy Roman Empire
- Died: March 17, 1652 (aged 64); Ziegenhain, Holy Roman Empire
- Scientific career
- Fields: Mathematics

Benjamin Bramer (15 February 1588 – 17 March 1652) was a German mathematician, architect, inventor, and adviser.

== Early life ==
Bramer was born on 15 February 1588 in Felsberg, Hesse to a Protestant minister father. The minister later died when Bramer was three years old. This led him to be adopted by his brother-in-law, Jost Bürgi, who was a prominent mathematician at the time. He moved to Bürgi's home in Kassel after being adopted. Bürgi educated Bramer from a young age, particularly in the fields of mathematics and architecture. When Bramer was 16 he stayed in Prague with his foster father after Bürgi was appointed to the imperial court. Bramer would stay there for five years before returning to Kassel to begin his career.

== Career ==
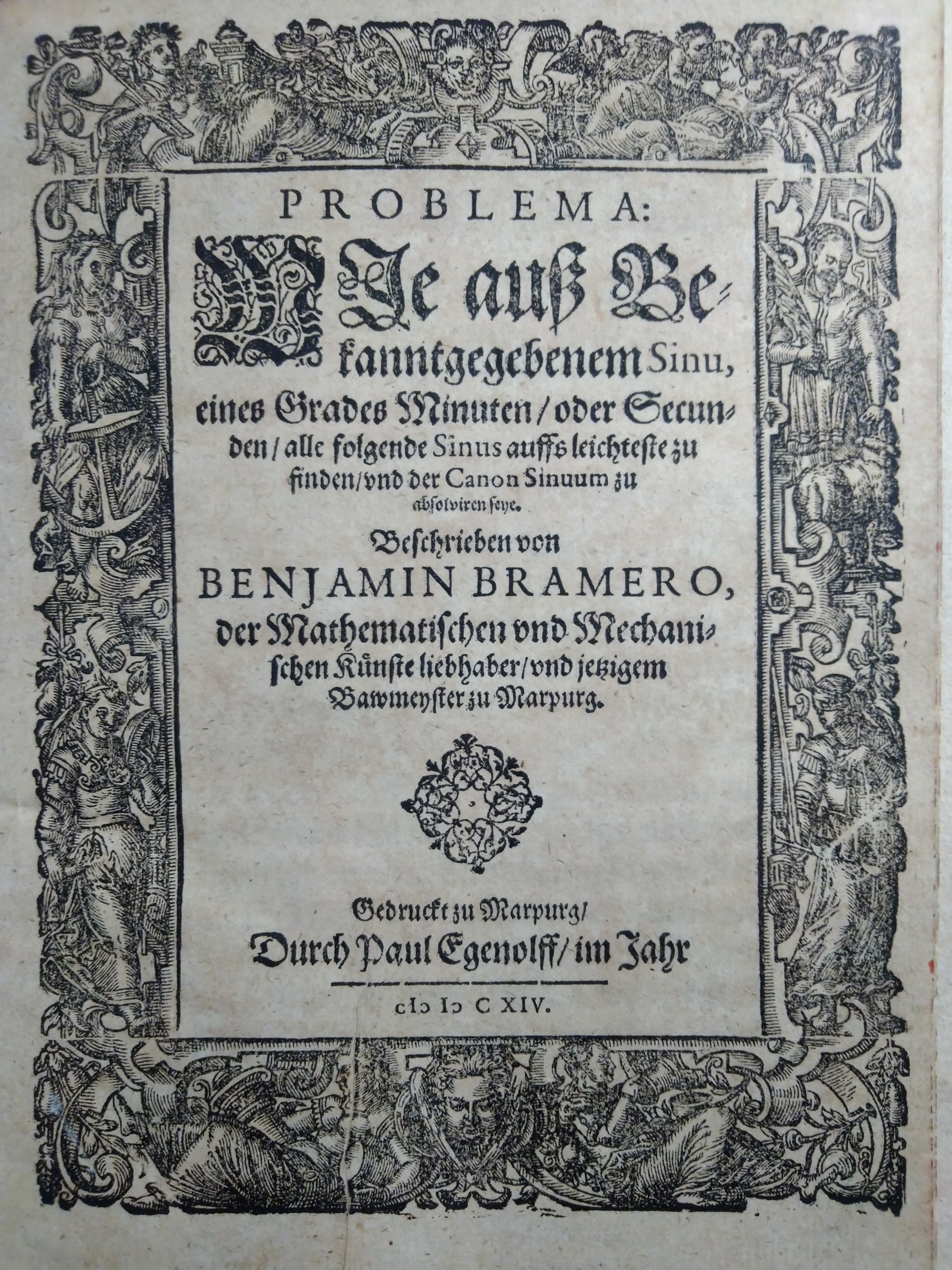
Title page of the Benjamin Bramer's booklet Problema wie aus bekannt gegebenem sinu (...), Marburg, 1614

One of his first jobs was as an architectural adviser to Count Christian von Waldeck. He advised him to construct a new church in the town of Widungen, but the out break of the Thirty Years' War caused him to begin focusing on the design of military fortifications. One such fortification was the Rheinfels Castle which he improved for the Count of Solms. In 1635 he became the master builder of Ziegenhain Fortress.

Bramer's first scientific publication was in 1614. Titled Problema wie aus bekannt gegebenem sinu eines Grades, Minuten oder Sekunden alle folgenden sinus aufs leichtests zu finden und der canon sinuum zu absolvieren sei he described various measures to calculate sines. He also published a work on vacuums titled Kurze Meldung vom Vacuo oder leerem Orte, neben anderen wunderbaren und subtilen Quaestionen, desgleichen Nic Cusani Dialogus von Waag und Gewicht.

In 1630, he constructed an early pantograph enabling him to draw accurate geometric perspective which he described in an earlier 1617 publication titled Trigonometrica planorum mechanica oder Unterricht und Beschreibung eines neuen und sehr bequemen geometrischen Instrumentes zu allerhand Abmessung. Although he is typically not credited with the invention of the pantograph, his early design is superior to the pantograph invented by Christoph Scheiner.
