= Heiligenberg (Naumburg) =

Mountain in Germany

Coordinates: 51°12′05″N 9°12′07″E

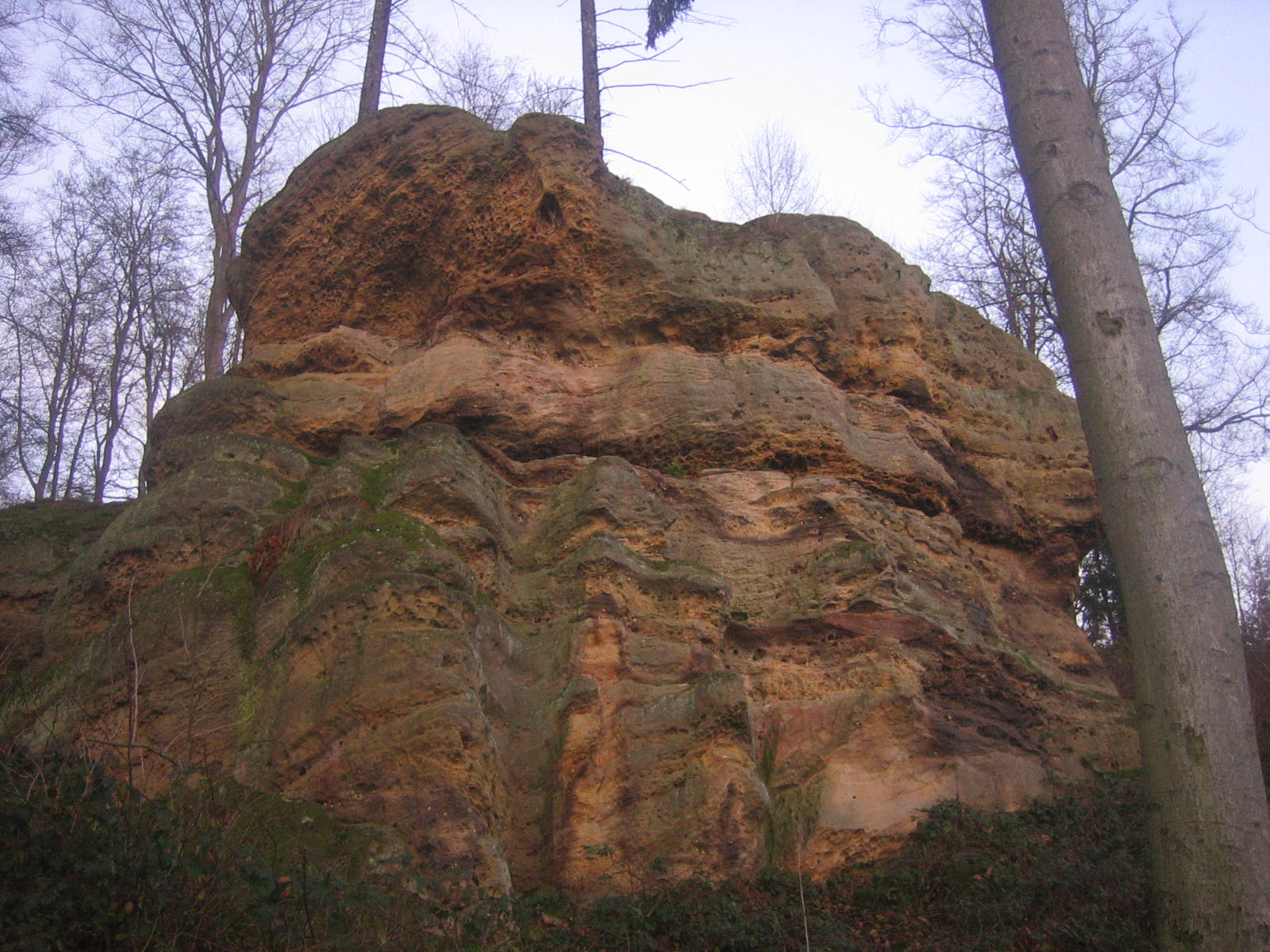
- Riesenstein von Heimarshausen

Highest point
- Elevation: 380 m (1,250 ft)

Geography
- Location: Hesse, Germany
- Parent range: West Hesse Highlands

Heiligenberg is a mountain of Hesse, Germany. It is located between Altendorf to the north and Heimarshausen to the south of the Naumburgh township in the district of Kassel. It lies in the East Waldeck Border Lowlands (Ostwaldecker Randsenken) of the West Hesse Highlands (Westhessisches Bergland), and is covered with a mixed deciduous and evergreen forest. It lies within the Habichtswald Nature Park. The Elbe, a northern tributary of the Eder, runs east past the mountain.

On the southeast flank of the Heiligenberg, at 318.2 m, is the giant stone of Heimarshausen (Riesenstein von Heimarshausen), a roughly 9 m high, jagged and white-red sandstone rock, which in prehistoric times was a site of sacrifice, a place of worship and an observatory and is today designated as a natural monument.
