= Conrad III of Dhaun =

German nobleman

- Conrad's epitaph in Mainz Cathedral
- Born: c. 1380
- Died: 1434
- Buried: 10 June 1434; Mainz Cathedral
- Noble family: vom Stein
- Father: John II of Stein-Dhaun
- Mother: Jutta of Leiningen

Conrad of Dhaun (c. 1380 – 1434) was a German nobleman. His relatives were the Wild- and Rhinegraves of Dhaun. He was Archbishop and Prince-elector of the Bishopric of Mainz from 1419 until his death as Conrad III. His term was marked by the Hussite wars and by serious disputes with the Landgraviate of Hesse and within the city of Mainz.

== Life ==
=== Ascent to Archbishop ===
Konrad was appointed canon in Mainz in 1396. In 1414, he became provost of Frankfurt Cathedral and governor of the Eichsfeld (an exclave of the Bishopric of Mainz). The residence of the governor was Rustenberg Castle, near Heiligenstadt. On 10 October 1419, he was elected archbishop of Mainz, and his election was confirmed by Pope Martin V on 15 December 1419. In this period, the residence of the Archbishops of Mainz was Ehrenfels Castle, now in Hesse, because the citizens of Mainz, which was a free imperial city, were hostile to the clergy.

=== Imperial politics ===
In August 1421, Conrad, together with Archbishop Dietrich II of Cologne and Elector Palatine Louis III, joined the Second anti-Hussite Crusade. They travelled to Bohemia via Cheb and participated in the siege of Žatec. However, the siege ended on 2 October when the imperial army fled after rumours spread that a large Hussite relief army was approaching.

Emperor Sigismund, Holy Roman Emperor appointed Conrad as imperial vicar during the Imperial Diet in Nuremberg on 25 August 1422. However, Elector Palatine Louis III objected to this appointment, on the grounds that the Golden Bull of 1356 had given the position of imperial vicar to the Elector Palatine for the areas where Franconian law was in force, and to the Elector of Saxony for the areas where Saxon law was in force. Conrad resigned in May 1423. In 1424, Conrad was a founding member of the League of Bingen, which opposed Emperor Sigismund.

In 1429, Conrad travelled to Bratislava, where he participated in his capacity as Archchancellor in the negotiations between Emperor Sigismund and the Hussite leaders.

=== Struggle with Hesse ===
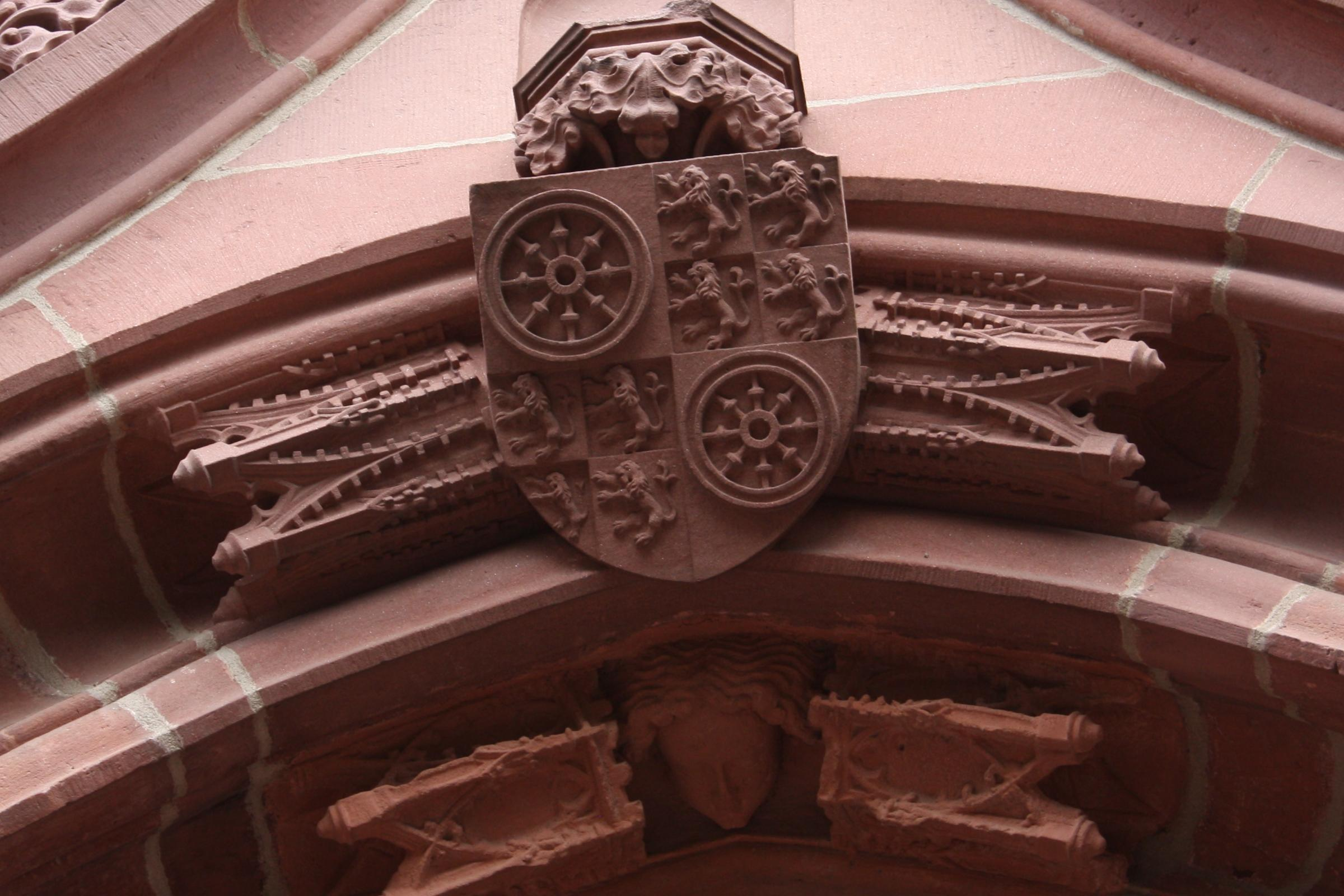
Conrad's coat of arms on the church of Eltville

The archbishops of Mainz had been struggling with the Landgraviate of Hesse over territorial dominance in the area for two centuries. In 1427, Conrad once again declared war on Hesse, about a sum of money due from the mortgage on the County of Waldeck, and also to support his close friend co-adjutor Herman II of Buchenau in a conflict with Prince-abbot John I of Fulda monastery. An army of 600 cavalry and additional infantry led by Count Gottfried of Leiningen (a younger relative of the cathedral dean of the same name), attacked northern Hesse from Fritzlar, an exclave of Mainz, and devastated the area around Gudensberg, Felsberg and Melsungen. However, they were defeated by Landgrave Louis I in a battle between the village of Großenenglis and nearby Holzheim (now an abandoned village), a few kilometers south of Fritzlar. Louis I defeated Gottfried again in pursuit engagements at Jesberg, Felsberg, and Fritzlar. Gottfried retreated to Fulda, where Conrad was ready with a second army. However, the city and monastery of Fulda refused Gottfried the protection of their city walls, and his army was decisively defeated on August 10.

On 8 December 1427, a peace treaty between Hesse and Mainz was signed in Frankfurt. Mainz had to accept almost all of its possession in Upper and Lower Hesse as Hessian fiefs, only Fritzlar, Naumburg, Amöneburg and Neustadt remained as allodial Mainzer possessions in the area. This spelled the end of Mainz's territorial aspirations in northern Hesse.

=== Dispute with Mainz ===
Only a few years later, there were violent clashes between the patricians and the guilds in Mainz. There were also tensions between the citizens and the clergy. In 1430, the patricians angrily left the city. In 1432, the city attempted to tax the clergy, and they left the city in 1433. Conrad excommunicated the city on 14 May 1434.

== Death ==
However, Conrad died a few weeks later. He was buried in Mainz Cathedral on 10 June 1434. His grave monument was probably sculpted by Madern Gerthener, whom Conrad knew from his period as pastor as St. Bartholomew. Gerthener had also sculpted the grave monument of Conrad predecessor, John II of Nassau.

== Footnotes ==
Conrad III of Dhaun vom Stein Born: c. 1380 Died: 1434
Preceded by John II of Nassau	Archbishop and Elector of Mainz; 1419-1434	Succeeded by Dietrich Schenk von Erbach
