= Heiligenburg Castle =

- Burg Heiligenburg
- Felsberg-Gensungen
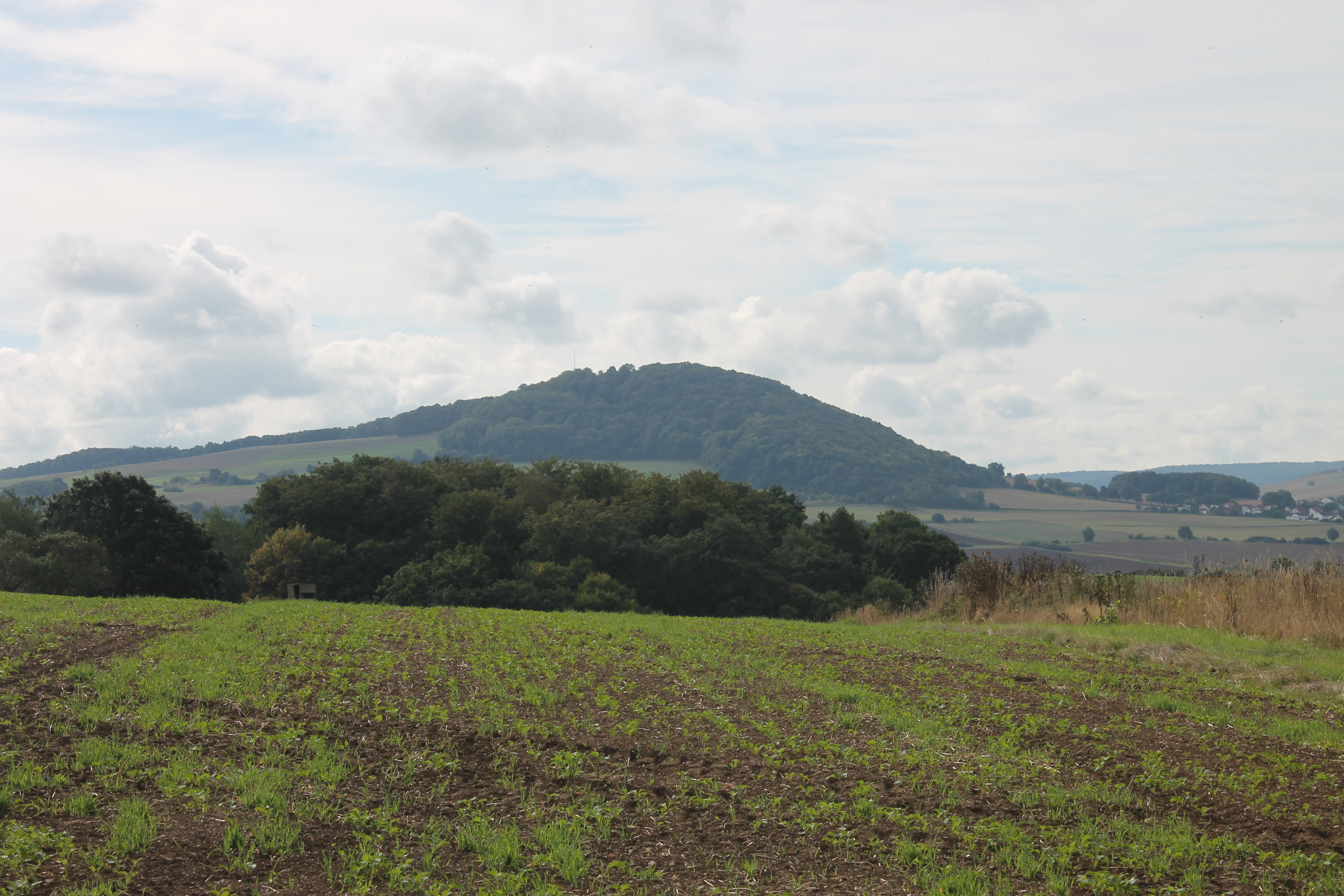
- Heiligenberg, as seen from Altenbrunslar

Site information
- Condition: ruined

Location
- Coordinates: 51.132778°N 9.458333°E

Site history
- Built: 12th century
- Materials: sandstone and basalt
- Demolished: 1232, 1273
- Rebuilt: 1247, 14th century
- Restored: 1956 to 1960
- Restored by: Heiligenberg Society

Airfield information
- Elevation: 393 metres (1,289 ft) AMSL

Heiligenburg Castle (German: Burg Heiligenburg) is a castle on the hill of Heiligenberg in the district of Schwalm-Eder-Kreis, Hesse, Germany.

Heilgenberg is a 393 m (1,289 ft) high hill close to the town of Felsberg-Gensungen in North Hesse. The hill is the remains of an extinct Miocene volcano, of which only the basalt that filled the neck of the volcano remains. The name of the hill stems from one of the oldest churches in Hesse.

Extensive views of the surrounding area can be seen from the ramparts of the ruins, and so that it is a local tourist attraction. The entrance to the ruined castle and tower is free.

== Early history ==
In prehistoric ages there was probably an Iron Age (La Tène B) fortress on the hill. Excavations by archeologists from Marburg University found two rounded bow fibulae (La Tène A/B) and a possible wall structure with ceramics that were dated at La Tène B. In early Christian times, there was a chapel on the Heiligenberg. This was proved by the finding of an old bell clapper during excavations, which probably came from the chapel.

== Construction ==
Before the castle was built, the Heiligenberg belonged to nobility, especially the viscounts (German: Vizegrafen) of Felsberg, who lived in the Felsburg castle at Felsberg. In the 12th century, the Thuringian and Hessian Landgraves argued with the Archbishop of Mainz over possession of the hill. Archbischop Conrad I constructed strong fortification on the Heiligenberg between 1180 and 1186 as protection against Louis III, Landgrave of Thuringia. Shortly after the building of the castle there was bitter fighting, because the fort lay strategically between Felsberg, Gudensberg, and Melsungen, and combined they threatened the strongly-fortified Fritzlar, which was the centre of the Electorate of Mainz power in North Hesse and the geographical heart of the Landgraviate of Hesse. In 1193 a knight named Heinrich von Heiligenberg is documented, who was probably an offspring of the nobles from Uttershausen (close to Wabern), and from 1196 until their demise in 1263, the family Isfried von Heiligenberg were castellans (German: Burgmannen) of the castle and had to protect it in the name of Mainz.

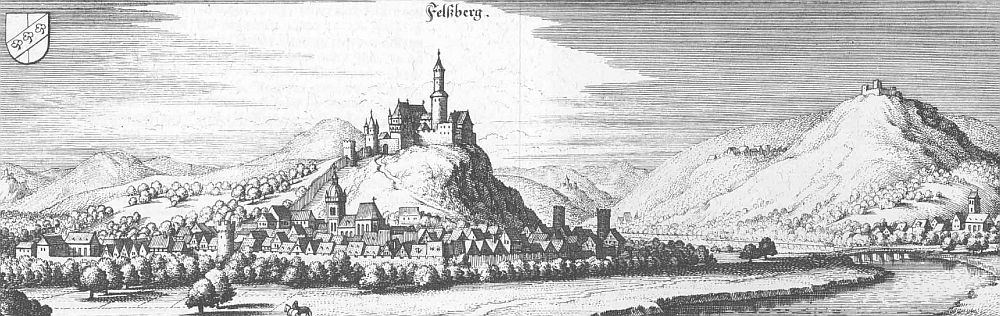
Felsberg (middle), Heiligenberg (right), Eppenberg Charterhouse (lower middle right) – Figure from Topographia Hassiae by Matthäus Merian 1655.

== Destruction, reconstruction and decay ==
In 1232, Conrad of Thuringia, who since 1231 had been responsible for the Hessian lands of the Landgraves of Thuringia, conquered and destroyed the town of Fritzlar as well as Heiligenburg Castle. In 1247 the castle was reconstructed by Mainz castellans from Wolfershausen. In 1273 the castle was destroyed again by Henry I, Landgrave of Hesse. The castle was not immediately restored and lay in ruins for many years.

From 1401 to 1403, Landgrave Hermann II built a smaller castle on Heiligenberg. This building stood until 1471, when the landgrave's nephew, Landgrave Louis II charged the nearby Eppenberg Charterhouse with the care of the castle. The landgrave ordered that the monks should pray for the castle's soul at least one a week in the church on the hill. Nevertheless, the wall of the castle and the chapel soon fell into decay. In the 15th century, the church was documented as a chapel.

== Modern times ==
During the Seven Years' War, there were numerous small battles on Heiligenberg. French troops camped out on the Heiligenberg for seven weeks in 1761. Their allies pitched their camp on the Felsburg. Two hills with trenches on the sides of the Felsberg hill are remains of the French occupation.

Around 1860, the forester Faber started afforestating the Heiligenberg. A refuge hut and working quarters were constructed. To protect the buildings and location, a so-called Heiligenberg club was started. In 1885 a larger refuge hut was constructed and shortly afterwards it was extended to include a restaurant. From 1902 to 1992 there was a wooden lookout tower on the summit of the hill. In 1934 planning began to excavate the ruins, and from 1935 to 1939 excavations and partial renovation were carried out under the direction of the government buildings inspector Georg Textor.

In 1952 a castle gate with a bell was installed and dedicated to the displaced people of World War II. From 1956 to 1960 the Heiligenberg Society began restoration again. On the festival ground a hotel and restaurant were constructed. In 2002 a sculpture trail – Ars Natura- was initiated; local artists have put various pieces of objet d'art along a path around the Heiligenberg.
