= Büraburg =

Castle ruin in Hesse, Germany

Coordinates: 51°07′14″N 9°14′11″E

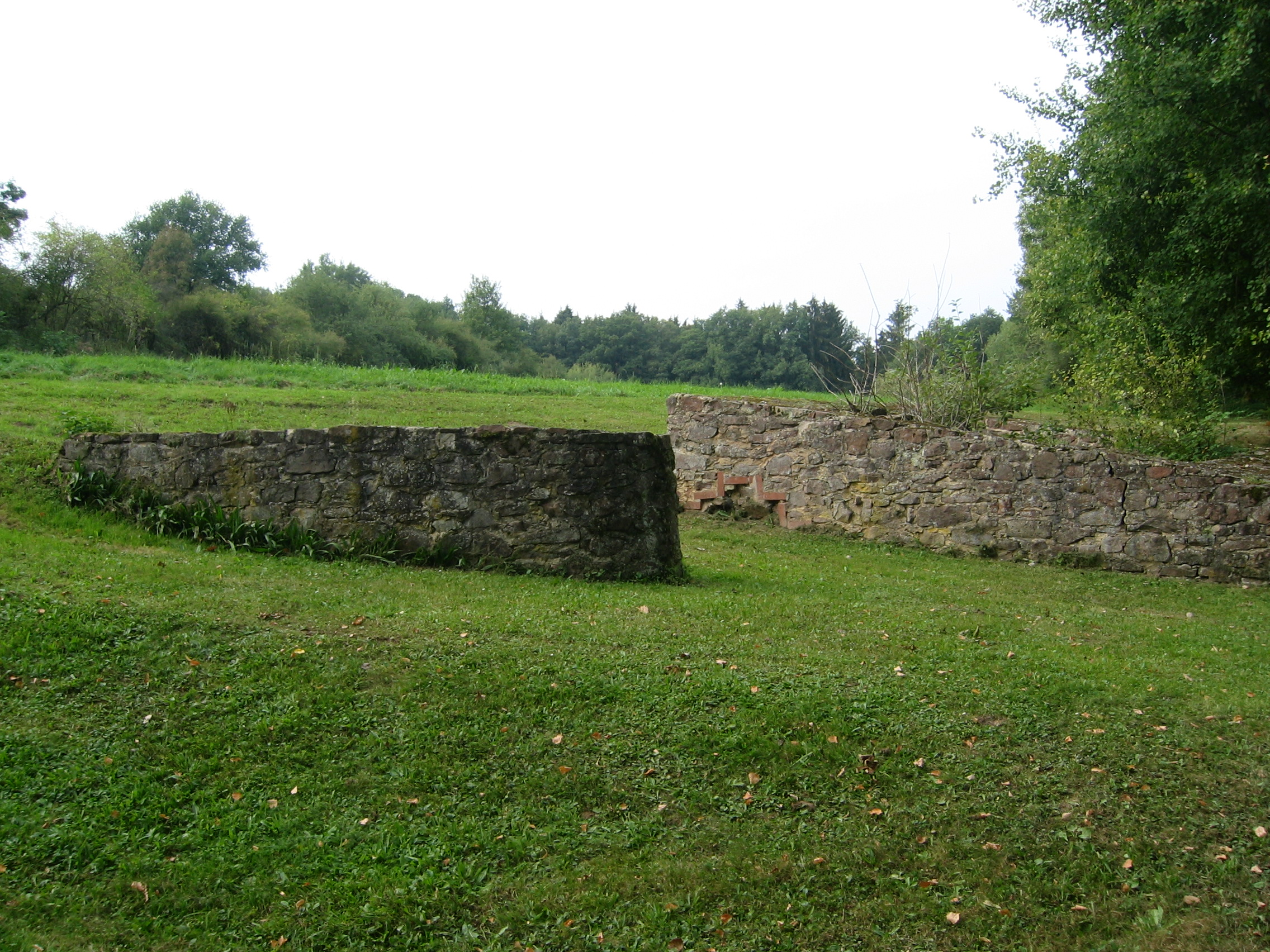
Büraburg, remains of a gate

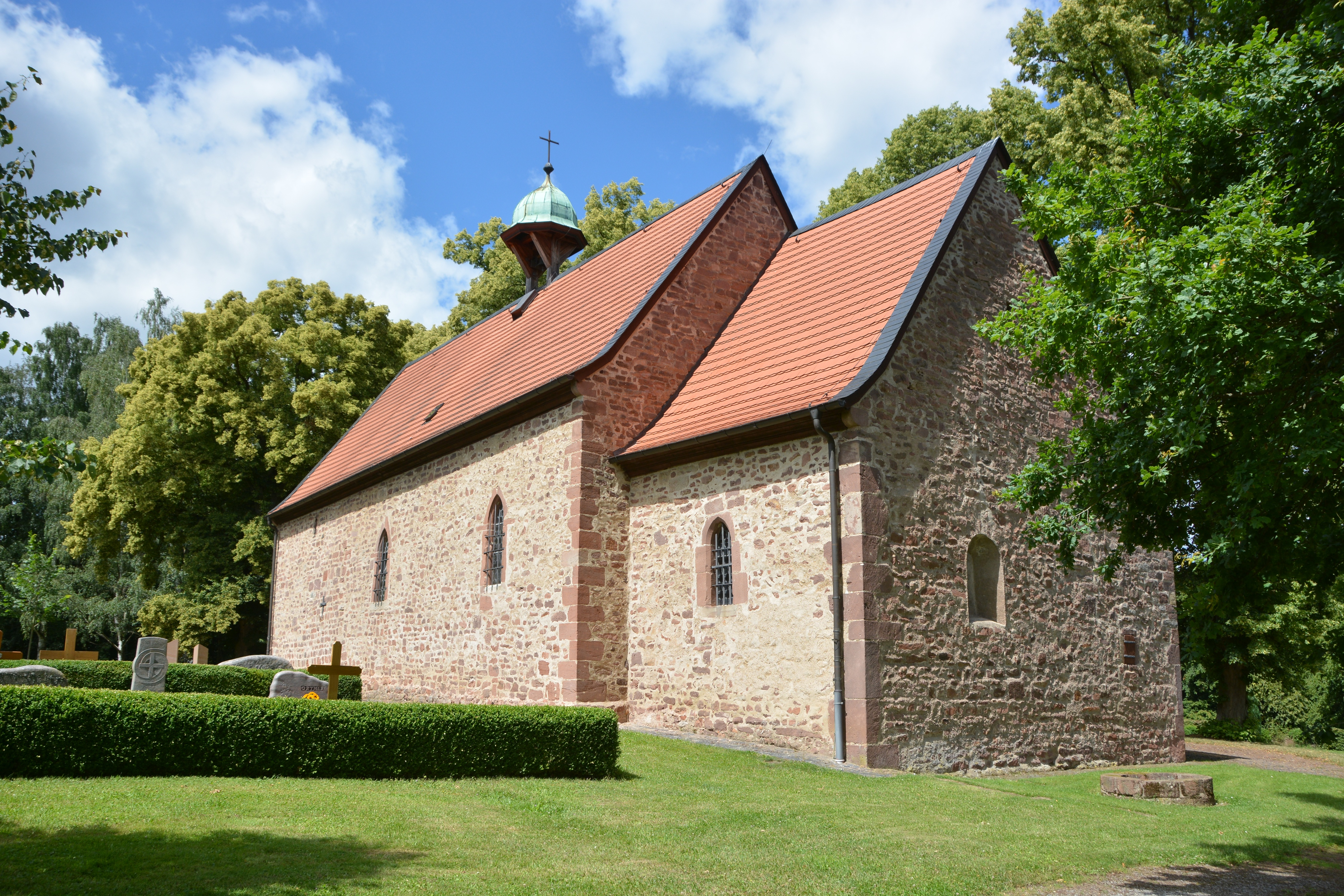
St. Brigida Chapel

The Büraburg was a prominent hill castle with historic significance, on the Büraberg hill overlooking the Eder river near the town of Fritzlar in northern Hesse (Germany). Only foundation walls remain, and a church dedicated to St. Brigida.

A Christian monastery was already located on the hill in the seventh century. It was occupied by the Franks c. 690, who fortified it with a castle and kept a mounted garrison there. The Franks supported the missionary efforts of Saint Boniface, who cut down the Donar Oak in nearby Geismar and established a short-lived bishopric in Büraburg.

== Background ==
=== Strategic importance ===
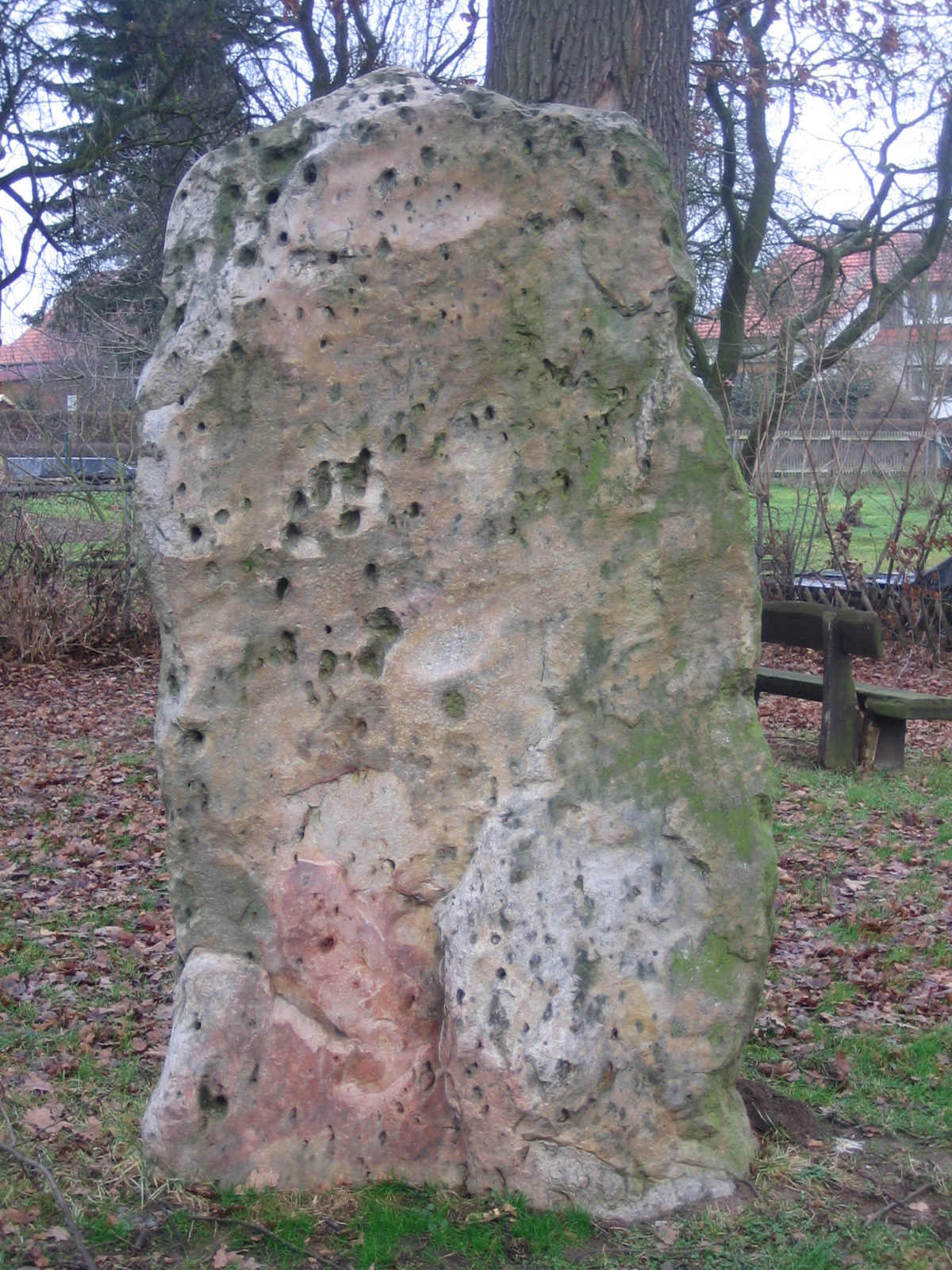
Wotanstein in Gudensberg

Hessia, from the early seventh century on, served as a buffer between areas dominated by the Saxons (to the north) and the Franks who brought the area to the south under their control in the early sixth century and occupied Thuringia (to the east) in 531.

By 650, the Franks were establishing themselves as overlords, which is suggested by archeological evidence of burials, and were building fortifications in various places including Christenberg. By 690 they were taking direct control over Hessia, apparently to counteract expansion by the Saxons, who built fortifications in Gaulskopf and Eresburg across the river Diemel, the northern boundary of Hessia. Büraburg (which already had a Frankish settlement in the sixth century) was one of the places the Franks fortified in order to resist the Saxon pressure, and according to John-Henry Clay the Büraburg was "probably the largest man-made construction seen in Hessia for at least seven hundred years". Walls and trenches totaling one kilometer in length were made, and they enclosed "8 hectares of a spur that offered a commanding view over Fritzlar and the densely populated heart of Hessia". The presence of a mounted garrison is deduced from archeological finds, including spurs, harness fittings, and fragments of weapons.

During the Saxon wars of Charlemagne, it was an important fortified base of the Franks, but with the final submission of the Saxons in 804 it lost its military significance.

=== Religion ===
The area around Fritzlar shows evidence of significant pagan belief from the first century on. Geismar was a particular focus of such activity; it was continuously occupied from the Roman period on, with a settlement from the Roman period, which itself had a predecessor from the fifth century BC. Excavations have produced a horse burial and bronze artifacts. A possible religious cult may have centered on a natural spring in Geismar, called Heilgenbron; the name "Geismar" (possibly "energetic pool") itself may be derived from that spring. The village of Maden, Gudensberg, now a part of Gudensberg near Fritzlar and less than ten miles from Geismar, was likely an ancient religious center: the basalt outcrop of Gudensberg is named for Wodan, and there is a two-meter tall quartz megalith called the Wotanstein in the center of the village.

Büraburg itself contained a Christian settlement before Boniface. The St. Brigida church was dated to the time of the Hiberno-Scottish mission by Joseph Vonderau, a Fulda archeologist who excavated Büraburg in the 1920s. According to Wand, the church must have been founded later; he states it probably served the Frankish fortress whose construction he dated c. 690. Though one scholar considers that Wand's later dating is correct and that there is no reason to assume the church was already named for St. Brigid, recent scholarship suggests perhaps Vonderau was correct in assuming the Hiberno-Scottish background. For instance, after renovations from 2002-2006, pieces of wood were found in the chancel arch that dated back to between the mid-sixth century and 667/668. This may mean that the church predates even the mission of Saint Kilian, who may have preached in the area in the 680s and was killed in Thuringia in 689—or it may mean that older wood was used to construct the church. Wand's excavations (1969-1996) revealed a monastic complex whose oldest layer contains a cistern lined with stone; one of those stones featured an inscription of the Benedictine cross. The complex could have housed an abbot with up to six monks. Excavations have shown traces of at least sixty buildings (not all from the same time period).

John-Henry Clay considers it likely that the church was indeed Hiberno-Scottish and dates from the earliest fortification, using wood from some nearby building. The connection between Kilian and Boniface is not unique; in Wurzburg Boniface promoted Kilian's cult, and he may have used the cistern in Büraburg as a baptismal font, continuing missionary work that already started before he came to the area.

== Donar Oak and bishopric ==
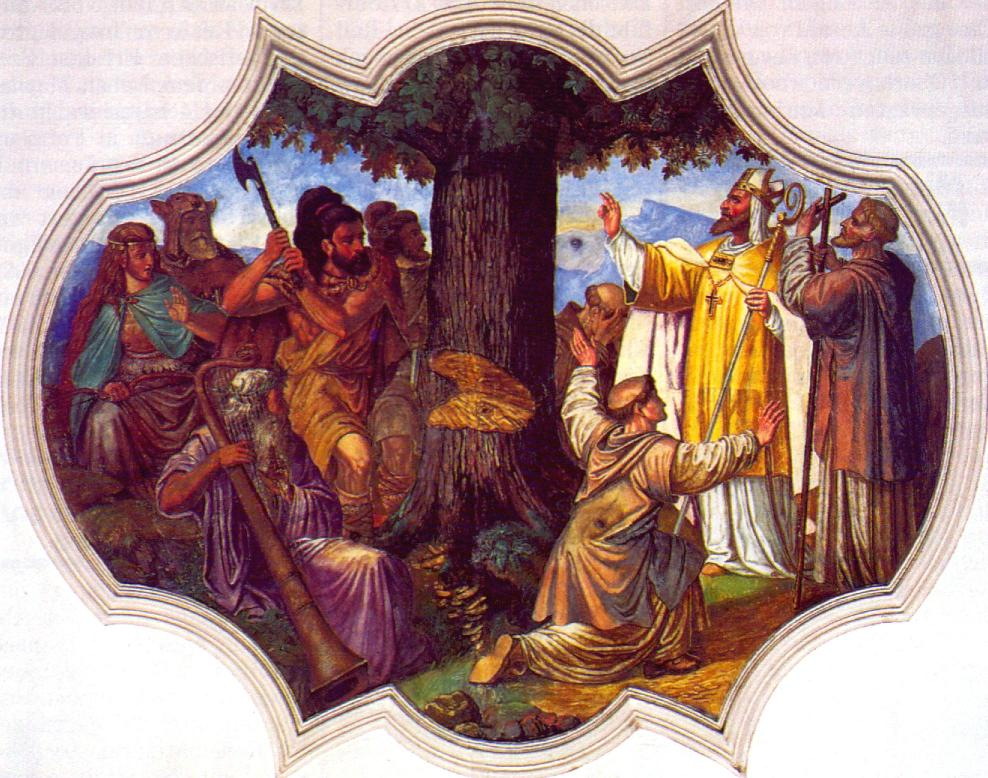
1737 painting of St. Boniface overseeing the felling of Donar's Oak, located in the St. Martinskirche of Westenhofen in Schliersee

In 723 AD the Anglo-Saxon missionary Saint Boniface arrived in the area on his mission to convert the central and northern German tribes to Christianity. Seeking to demonstrate the superiority of Christianity, he and his followers felled a sacred oak dedicated to the god Donar (Thor) by the local tribe of the Chatten/Chatti. His hagiography claims that when Thor failed to punish Boniface for his infraction, the locals agreed to be baptized.

Using the wood of the oak, Boniface erected a small chapel dedicated to Saint Peter at a site nearby, in what soon became the important religious, intellectual, and trade center of Fritzlar. Between 723 and 741 Büraburg may have been led by an abbot Humbert, or so local traditions hold. In 742 Boniface established a bishopric at Büraburg, the first in Germany north of the Roman Limes, but after the death of the only bishop, Witta, in 748 the bishopric was incorporated by Lullus, Boniface's successor as archbishop of Mainz, into his own diocese. From 747 to 786 Büraburg was administered by an auxiliary bishop, Meginoz, but this post was not filled again after Meginoz's death.

== Current situation ==
Excavations have unearthed extensive fortifications from the 7th and 8th century AD on the hilltop. Today, a church dedicated to St. Brigida stands at the site, containing parts of the original church building from the 7th century.
