= Mader Stein =

- Maderstein
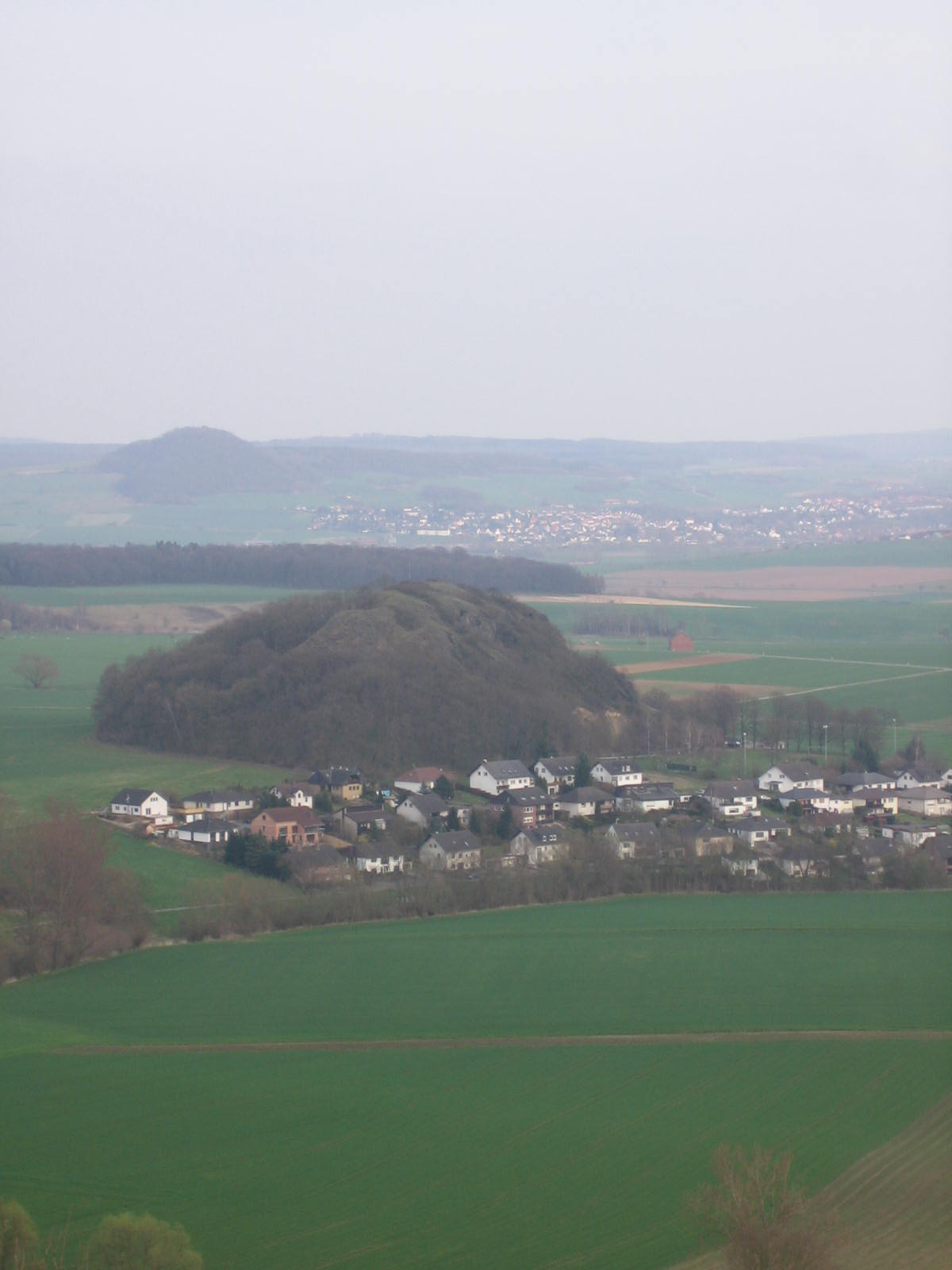

Highest point
- Elevation: 265 m (869 ft) Normalhöhennull
- Prominence: 55 m (180 ft) Lamsberg
- Isolation: 0.7 km (0.43 mi) Lamsberg
- Coordinates: 51°10′04″N 9°22′53″E

Geography
- Location within Germany
- Location: Schwalm-Eder-Kreis, Hesse, Germany
- Parent range: West Hesse Depression

Geology
- Rock age: Miocene
- Mountain type: neck of an extinct volcano
- Rock type: basalt

Mader Stein, or Maderstein, is a 265 m (869 ft) (NHN) high hill in North Hesse, Schwalm-Eder-Kreis, north-east of the village of Maden, which belongs to the town of Gudensberg.

== Geology ==
The hill is the remains of an extinct volcano that belongs to the West Hesse Depression. The volcano was active in the Miocene, i.e. during the period about 23 to 5 million years ago (Ma). The only part of the volcano that is left is the neck; the rest has been eroded. The alkali basalt has a silica (SiO_{2}) volume percentage of 45–55%. The main minerals in the rock are plagioclase, augite and olivine.

The hill cannot be called a kuppe because the top is covered with rock formations. Instead Mader Stein can considered a rocky hillock. The columns of basalt of the hill are sub-horizontal, as at Scharfenstein.

== Biotope ==
The hill, is part of a 311 ha Habitats Directive (German: Flora, Fauna, Habitat; FFH) conservation area that covers the Gudensberg region and the Falkenstein forest (FFH-Nr. 4721–304). Basalt is relatively poor in nutrients and minerals for plants, and the summit of the hill is very hot and dry in summer, which gives rise to unique flora successions. In particular, Dictamnus, a flowering plant in the family Rutaceae, is found on Mader Stein and Nenkel, although it is very rare in the rest of Germany. To maintain this situation the town of Gudensberg regularly sends people to cut down bushes (in particular blackthorn) that encroach on the summit of the hill.

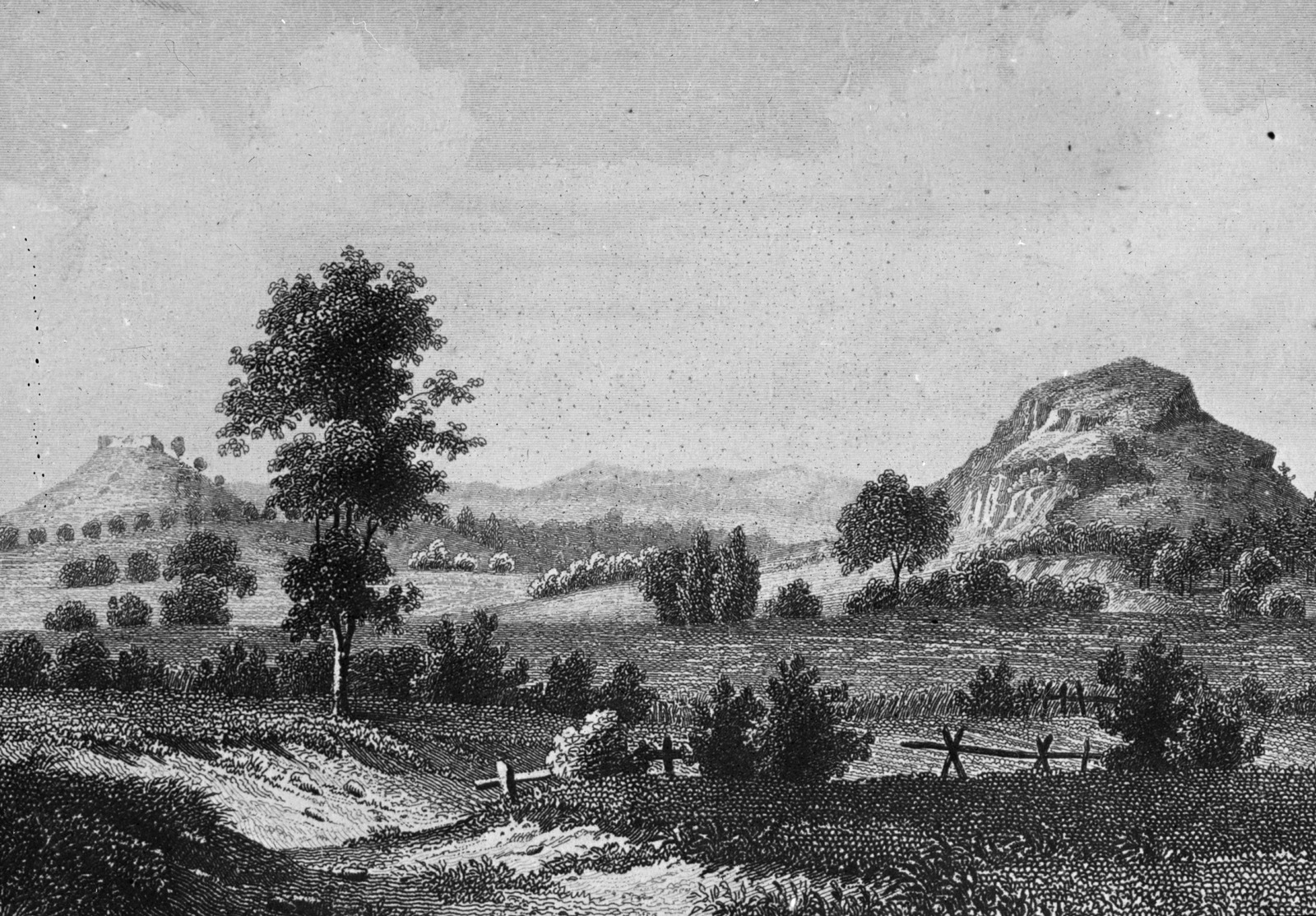
Steel engraving of Mader Stein (right) and the Odernberg in Gudensberg (left) from the collection of Ernst Wahle, kept at the library of the University of Heidelberg.

== Traditions ==
In previous times the hill was climbed on Ascension Day to dance or collect wild herbs. During Advent a Christmas tree is illuminated on the top of the hill.

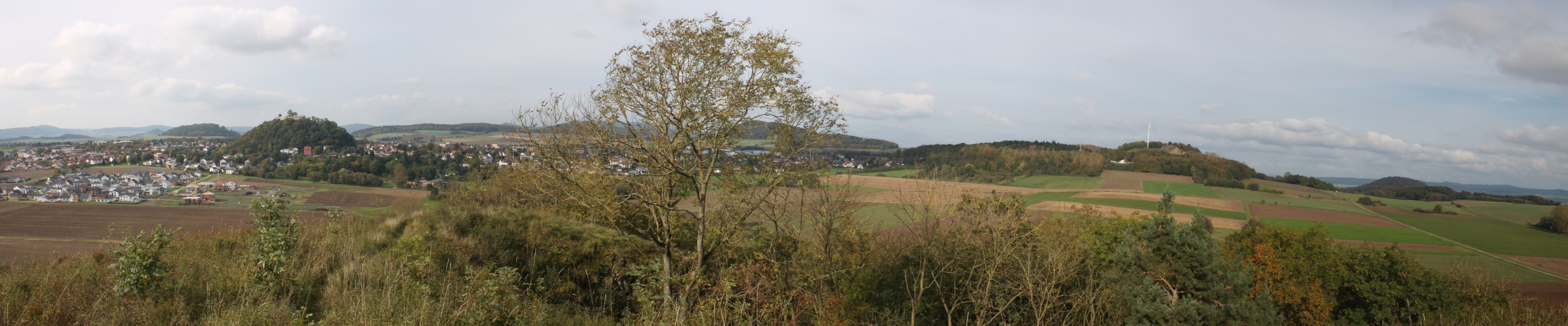
Northern panorama from the top of Mader Stein. On the left of the tree is the town of Gudensberg around the Obernberg. Right of the tree are, from left to right, the Lamsberg with a wind turbine and Lotterberg

== Legend ==
The first Christian church in Fritzlar was built by Saint Boniface in the year 732 from the wood of the Donar's Oak that he felled in Gaesmere, part of the town of Fritzlar, in the year 723/24. It is said that the Devil, who lived on Mader Stein (or the nearby Lamsberg), wanted to destroy the church with a stone. There are two different versions of the next part:

1. Either the stone caught in his sleeve, or
2. the stone was deflected by the upheld shield of the archangel Michael.

Either way, the stone fell in a field on the outskirts of Maden. This is a real stone; a menhir called Wotanstein. The marks and scratches on the stone are said to have been caused by the devil's claws.
