= Züschen =

Züschen may refer to:

- Züschen, Fritzlar, a village in Hesse, Germany
- Züschen (megalithic tomb), a prehistoric burial monument in Hesse, Germany
