= Witta of Büraburg =

Witta of Büraburg (also known as Albuin or Vito Albinus, a close Latin translation of his Germanic name) (born in Wessex; died 26 October 747) was one of the early Anglo-Saxon missionaries in Hesse and Thuringia in central Germany. He was also a disciple and companion of Saints Boniface and Lullus.

Following the establishment by Boniface of the bishopric of Büraburg near Fritzlar in 741, Witta was the first and only bishop there. After his death on 26 October 747, no successor was appointed and Lullus, then archbishop of Mainz, incorporated the bishopric into his own because he wanted to have control over the Christian missionary efforts towards the East. Witta was buried in the chapel of Saint Sturm (Sturmius, Sturmi) which Lullus later (769) used as the nucleus for the new and influential Benedictine Hersfeld Abbey.

His feast day falls on 26 October.
