= Fritzlar =

- Town
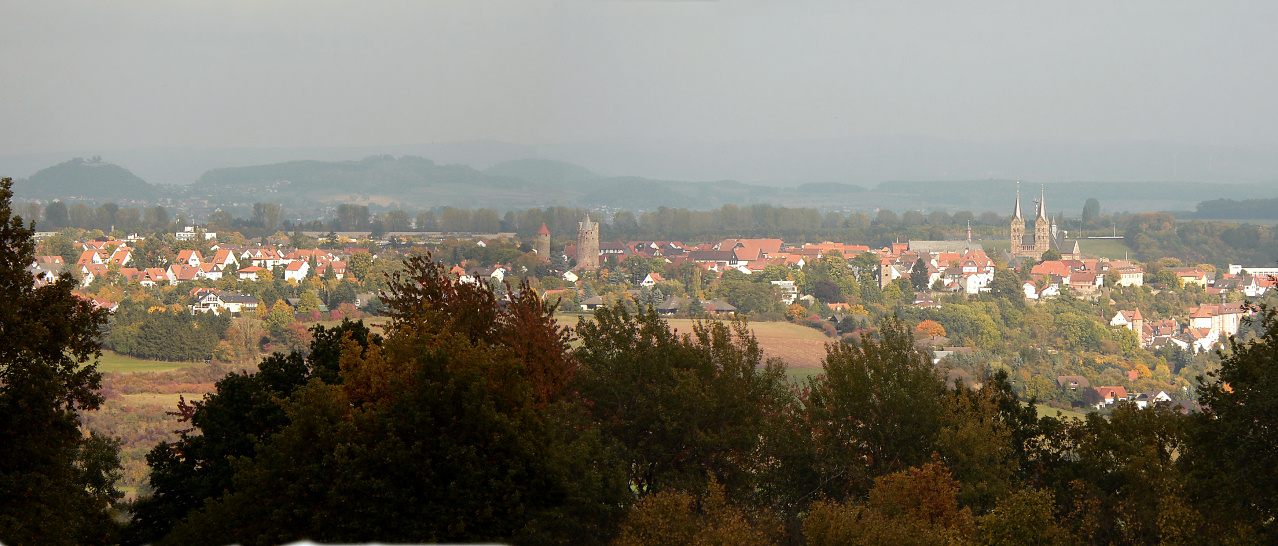
- View of Fritzlar

- Flag Coat of arms

- Location of Fritzlar within Schwalm-Eder-Kreis district
- Interactive map of Fritzlar
- Location within Germany Location within Hesse
- Coordinates: 51°8′N 9°17′E
- Country: Germany
- State: Hesse
- Admin. region: Kassel
- District: Schwalm-Eder-Kreis

Government
  - Mayor (2018–24): Hartmut Spogat (CDU)

Area
  - Total: 88.81 km^{2} (34.29 sq mi)
- Elevation: 170 m (560 ft)

Population (2025-12-31)
  - Total: 14,503
  - Density: 163.3/km^{2} (423.0/sq mi)
- Time zone: UTC+01:00 (CET)
  - Summer (DST): UTC+02:00 (CEST)
- Postal codes: 34560
- Dialling codes: 05622
- Vehicle registration: HR
- Website: www.fritzlar.de

Fritzlar (German pronunciation: [ˈfʁɪtslaːɐ̯]) is a small town (pop. 15,000) in the Schwalm-Eder district in northern Hesse, Germany, 160 km (99 mi) north of Frankfurt, with a storied history.

The town has a medieval center ringed by a wall with numerous watch towers. The "Grey Tower" ("Grauer Turm") is the highest remaining urban defense tower in Germany, at thirty-eight meters (125 feet) high. The city hall, first documented in 1109, with a stone relief of St. Martin, the town's patron saint, is the oldest in Germany still in use for its original purpose. The Gothic church of the old Franciscan monastery is today the Protestant parish church, and the monastery's other buildings have been converted into a modern hospital. Many houses in the town center, notably around the market square, date from the 15th to 17th centuries and have been carefully maintained or restored. The town is dominated by the imposing Romanesque-Gothic Church of St. Peter from the 12th-14th centuries.

In 1974, the town hosted the 14th Hessentag state festival.

== Geography ==
Fritzlar lies in northern Hesse, mainly on the north bank of the Eder river. Ten villages in the surrounding area were incorporated into the town in 1974, among them the former town of Züschen. The area is characterized by fertile farmland and mostly wooded basalt peaks, many of which are topped by medieval castles or castle ruins. Examples of these can be found at Gudensberg, Homberg, Felsberg, Heiligenberg, Altenburg, Jesberg, and Naumburg, among others.

== Climate ==
Climate data for Fritzlar (1981-2010)
Month	Jan	Feb	Mar	Apr	May	Jun	Jul	Aug	Sep	Oct	Nov	Dec	Year
Mean daily maximum °C (°F)	3.3 (37.9)	4.5 (40.1)	9.4 (48.9)	14.3 (57.7)	18.9 (66.0)	21.6 (70.9)	24.1 (75.4)	23.8 (74.8)	19.4 (66.9)	13.8 (56.8)	7.8 (46.0)	4.1 (39.4)	13.8 (56.7)
Mean daily minimum °C (°F)	−2.3 (27.9)	−2.5 (27.5)	0.7 (33.3)	3.2 (37.8)	7.1 (44.8)	10.0 (50.0)	11.9 (53.4)	11.5 (52.7)	8.7 (47.7)	5.2 (41.4)	1.9 (35.4)	−0.9 (30.4)	4.5 (40.2)
Average rainfall mm (inches)	36.6 (1.44)	34.7 (1.37)	34.9 (1.37)	37.7 (1.48)	64.1 (2.52)	53.9 (2.12)	67.7 (2.67)	54.2 (2.13)	50.5 (1.99)	44.2 (1.74)	45.4 (1.79)	41.5 (1.63)	565.4 (22.25)
Source: Météoclimat

== History ==
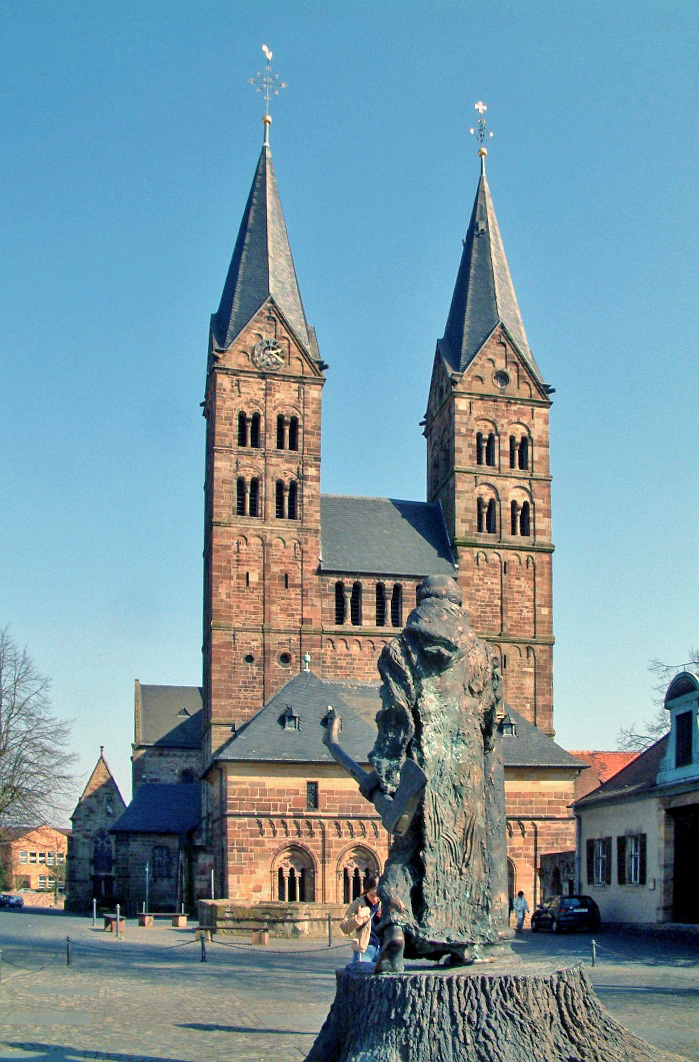
Saint Peter's Church, with statue of St. Boniface, who was a Christian missionary from England, in foreground

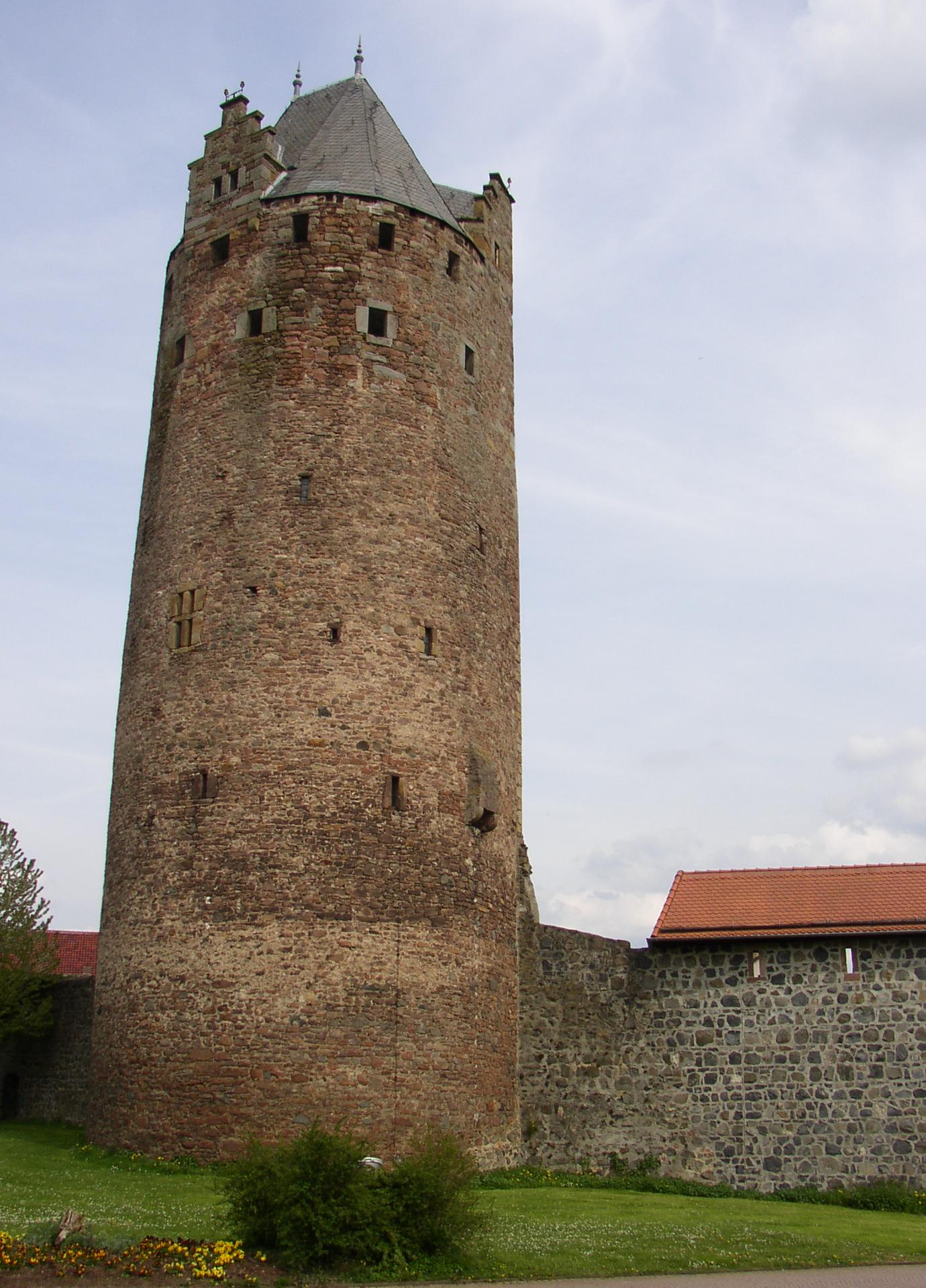
Grey Tower

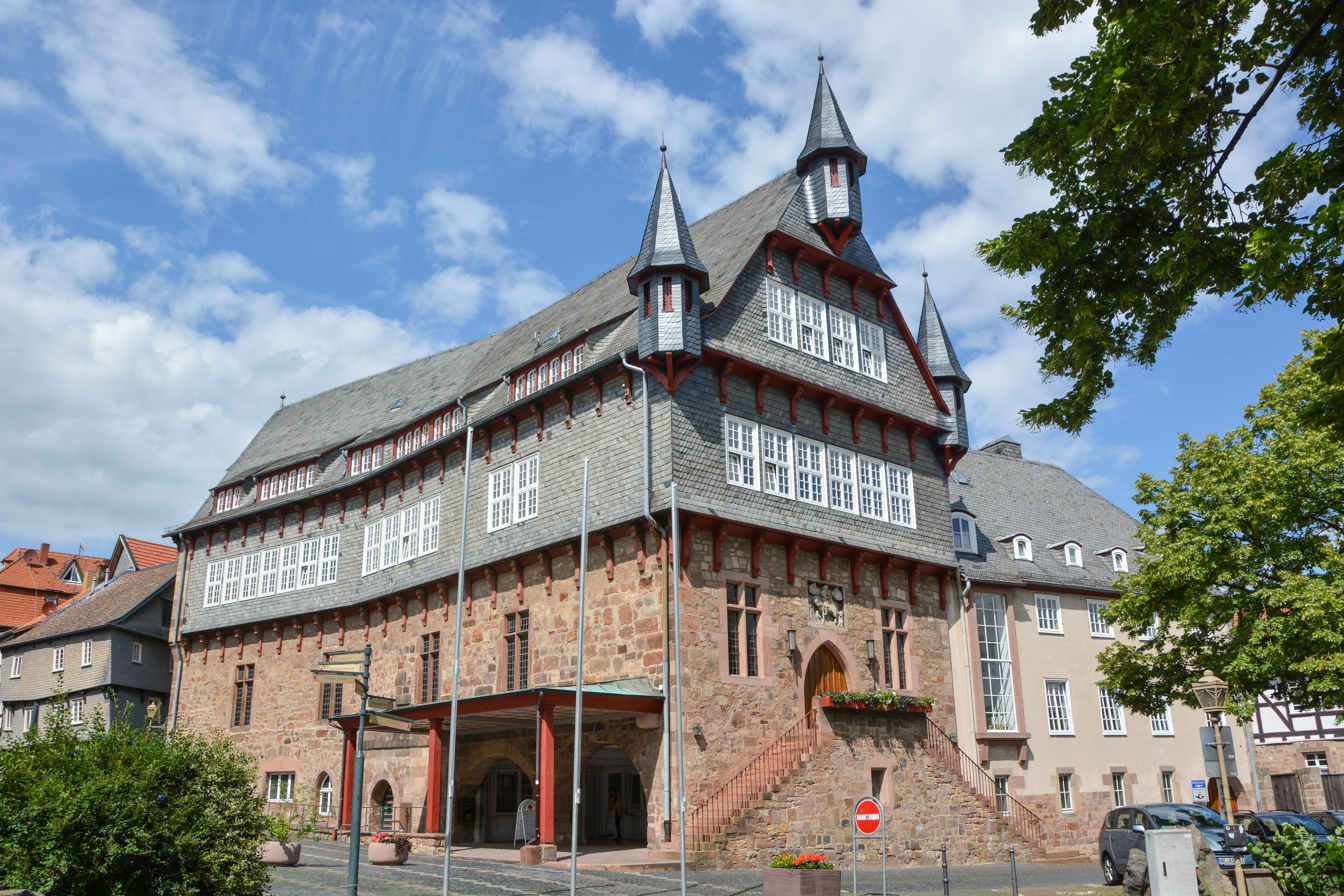
Town Hall

=== Saint Boniface ===
The Anglo-Saxon missionary Saint Boniface, apostle of the Germans, established a church and monastery dedicated to Saint Peter in Fritzlar in 724. The current Saint Peter's Church, constructed in the 11th century, is accompanied by a monument to Boniface.

Boniface also established the first bishopric in Germany outside the boundaries of the old Roman Empire on a hill (Büraburg) across the Eder river, where a Frankish fortress and town provided protection, but after the death of Witta, its first and only bishop, in 747 the bishopric was incorporated into the diocese (later archdiocese) of Mainz by Lullus, the disciple and successor of Boniface as archbishop of Mainz. The Benedictine monastery founded by Boniface in Fritzlar in 724 gained prominence as a center of religious and worldly learning under its first abbot, Saint Wigbert, who built the original stone basilica of 732 on the site of Boniface's wooden chapel. In 782 emperor Charlemagne granted it imperial protection and substantial territory, and this triggered the rapid development of the town around it. The monastery was converted into a college of secular canons (Chorherrenstift) in 1005, its members no longer living in monastic union and simplicity, but maintaining their own, and generally rather well-to-do, households in town in the vicinity of the church. Several imposing stone residences (Curias) built by wealthy canons during the 14th century survive to this day in the old part of the town. The canons' college was dissolved only in 1803.

=== Birthplace of the German Kingdom ===
Located at the crossroads of several important trade routes and site of an imperial residence since Charlemagne, Fritzlar was a frequent site of royal visits and of assemblies and synods of the German princes and church leaders during the early Middle Ages. Undoubtedly the most important of these was the Reichstag of 919 when Henry I ("Henry the Fowler"), duke of Saxony, was elected King of the Germans to succeed Charlemagne's Frankish successors on the throne of what had become known as the East Frankish Empire. This event marked the end of bitter rivalry between the two large German tribes of the Franks and the Saxons and the beginning of the German Empire that lasted until the Napoleonic wars. King Conrad I of Germany, duke of Franconia, had died in December 918 without a son and urged his brother, margrave Eberhard, who was to succeed him as Duke of Franconia, to nominate Henry as king, although they had been at odds with each other from 912 to 915 over the title to lands in Thuringia. Conrad's choice was respected by the Reichstag of 919, where Henry was proclaimed king by the leaders of the Franks and Saxons. Burchard I, Duke of Swabia quickly swore allegiance as well, but Duke Arnulf of Bavaria did not submit to Henry until the latter advanced with an army into Bavaria in 921.

Conrad himself had risen to the position of duke of Franconia only after defeating the rival Babenberg counts in a battle near Fritzlar in 906, in which his father, Conrad, Duke of Thuringia the Elder, was killed.

=== Developments during the Middle Ages ===
In 1079 Fritzlar ceased to be a crown possession when it was given to the archbishop of Mainz by Emperor Henry IV in the aftermath of his submission to the Pope at Canossa. It thus became a pivotal pillar in the long-lasting feuds between Mainz and the landgraves of Thuringia and later of Hesse for territorial supremacy in northern Hesse.

Located in the border area between Frankish and Saxon territories and, following Martin Luther's Reformation, a Roman Catholic enclave owned by the Archbishop of Mainz in the midst of Protestant Hesse, the town was frequently embattled, by Saxons and Franks, by Protestant and Catholic princes, and repeatedly sacked and rebuilt.

The first major devastation occurred in 774, during Charlemagne's Saxon Wars. While the king was in Italy, the Saxons invaded Hesse and besieged Büraburg, where the population of Fritzlar had sought refuge. Failing to take the fortress, the Saxons destroyed Fritzlar, but not St. Wigbert's stone basilica. This gave rise to the legend that two angels had appeared to chase away the invaders and protect the church.

The next happened in 1079. Emperor Henry IV, who frequently resided in Fritzlar, was faced with an insurrection led by the pretender king Rudolf of Swabia (Rudolf of Rheinfelden), who had been supported by the Pope. Having submitted to the Pope at Canossa in 1077, Henry had gone to Fritzlar. A papal legate was not able to arrange an end to the dispute, and in early 1079 an army of Saxons, partisans of Rudolf, attacked Henry in Fritzlar. He fled, and town and church were sacked and destroyed.

Between about 1085 and 1118, a new and larger basilica was built at the site of St. Wigbert's church. It was the site of the imperial synod of 1118 at which the papal interdict of Henry V, who again had opposed the pope on the matter of investiture of bishops, was announced and ratified and where Saint Norbert of Xanten, founder of the order of the Premonstratensians (Norbertines) and later archbishop of Magdeburg, successfully defended himself against charges of heresy. At the same synod, prince-bishop Otto of Bamberg was suspended for having remained loyal to Henry V during his quarrels with the papacy.

This second basilica was radically reconstructed between 1180 and 1200, essentially in the form in which it is still found today, although a number of smaller additions and alterations have been made throughout the centuries since then. During the same period, from 1184 to 1196, the town was fortified by the construction of the first wall around its periphery.

The next devastating blow was the sack of the town by Thuringian landgrave Conrad in 1232, when much of the population was killed and the town plundered. Mainz responded by immediately rebuilding and further fortifying the town, adding numerous towers to the walls and building seven watch towers and fortified refuges on strategic hills in the surrounding countryside.

In the early 13th century, the Franciscans (Friars Minor) established a monastery in the town. They obtained permission to build their church and quarters directly up against the town wall, thereby obliterating the watch walk on the inside of the wall that was crucial for quickly moving defenders from one part of the wall to another. In exchange they had to agree to defend their part of the town's fortification in the event of a siege. The Franciscans were forced to leave when the Lutheran Reformation was introduced in 1522. Following the Counterreformation, Jesuits moved in during 1615, followed by the return of the Franciscans in 1619. The monastery was dissolved in 1811. Its splendid Gothic church, completed in 1244, today serves as the parish church for the town's Protestant Christians who purchased it in 1817/1824.

The Thirty Year War (1618–1648) inflicted serious damage on Fritzlar and the neighboring villages, culminating with an outbreak of the black plague. The town's population dropped from about 2000 to merely 600, and it took 200 years before the inhabitants again numbered 2000. During the Seven Years' War (1756–1763) the town was occupied by French troops and parts of its fortifications were destroyed, along with the vineyards on the steep slope above the Eder river.

In the early 18th century, the order of Ursuline nuns established a nunnery and school for girls.

=== Modern age ===
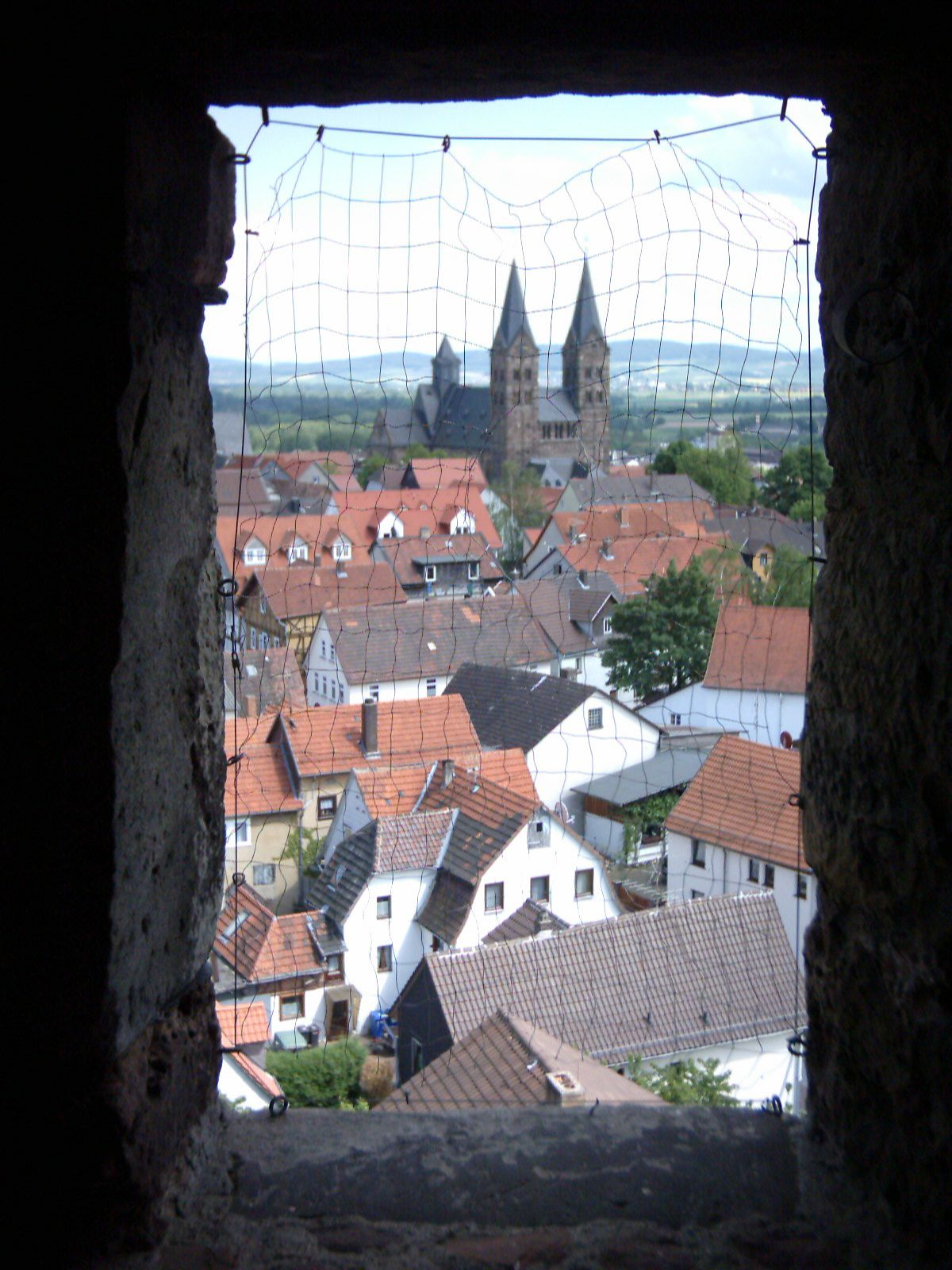
View of Fritzlar from the Grey Tower

In 1803, when all ecclesiastic states in Germany were abolished, Fritzlar was incorporated, together with Naumburg, as the nominal Principality of Fritzlar into the Electorate (principality) of Hesse-Kassel (Kurhessen or Hesse-Cassel). In 1821 it became the administrative center of the district (Kreis) Fritzlar. Hesse-Kassel in turn was annexed by Prussia in 1866, following the Austro-Prussian War in which the Elector had sided with Austria. In 1932 the district was merged with the neighboring district of Homberg to form the district of Fritzlar-Homberg.

In 1974, the three districts of Fritzlar-Homberg, Melsungen and Ziegenhain were combined into the new district Schwalm-Eder, with its administrative seat in Homberg (Efze).

Today, Fritzlar is a service and market center for the surrounding area, with schools, hospital, and a sizeable military garrison with airfield which is the homebase of the Luftbewegliche Brigade 1 (1st Air Mobile Brigade) and the Kampfhubschrauberregiment 36 Kurhessen (Attack Helicopter Regiment 36) of the German Army.

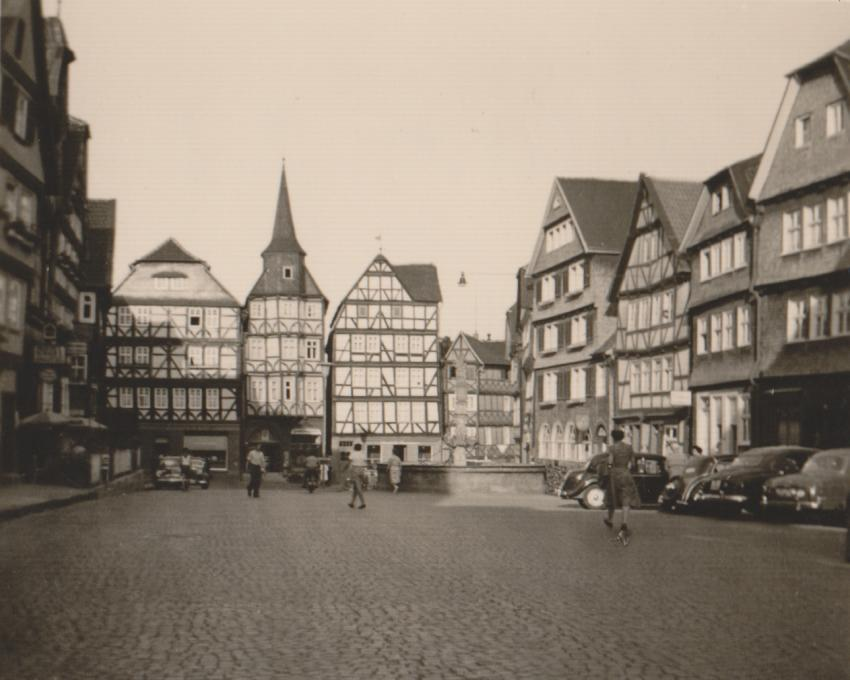
The market square in 1954

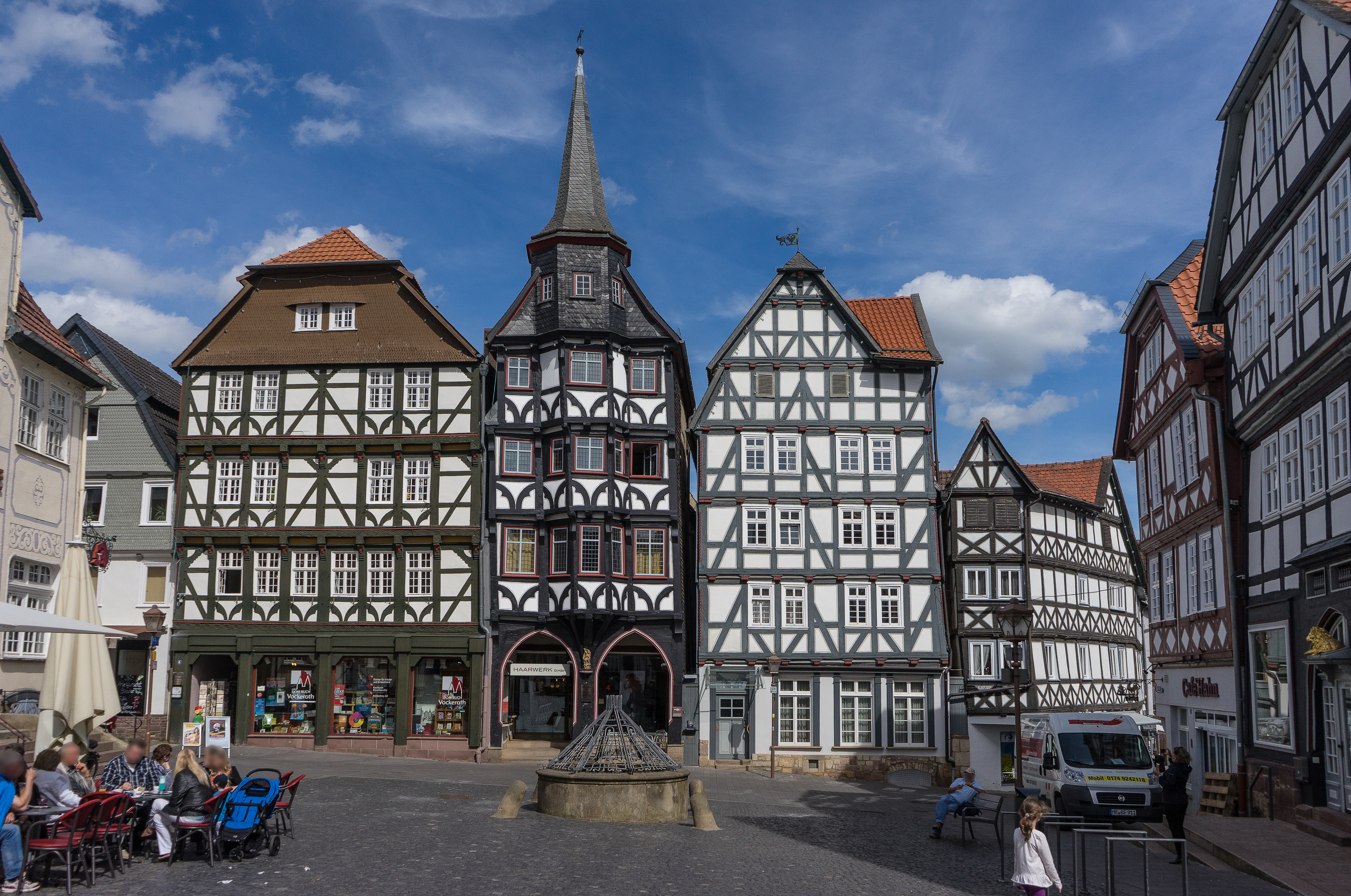
The market square in 2015

== Politics ==
Town council consists of 37 councillors. As of the last municipal election held on 31 March 2021, the seats are apportioned thus:

CDU	: 16 seats
SPD	: 10 seats
FWG (citizens' coalition)	: 5 seats
Greens	: 5 seats
FDP	: 1 seat

The town executive (Magistrat) consists of 10 members and the mayor.

Mayor Hartmut Spogat (CDU) was reelected on 28 January 2018 with a 78.48% share of the vote. The FWG candidate Gert Rohde got 21.52% of the vote.

=== Coat of arms ===
The civic coat of arms shows two red wheels joined by a cross of the same colour and the whole set from upper left to lower right (or upper right to lower left, heraldically speaking) on a silver background. As such, it bears a keen likeness to Mainz's civic coat of arms, simply having the colours reversed but showing the same "Double Wheel of Mainz", and this recalls the centuries-long allegiance that Fritzlar owed the Archbishopric of Mainz.

=== Town partnerships ===
- Burnham-on-Sea and Highbridge (civil parish), Somerset, United Kingdom
- Casina, Emilia-Romagna, Italy
- Middleton, Wisconsin, United States

== Notable residents ==
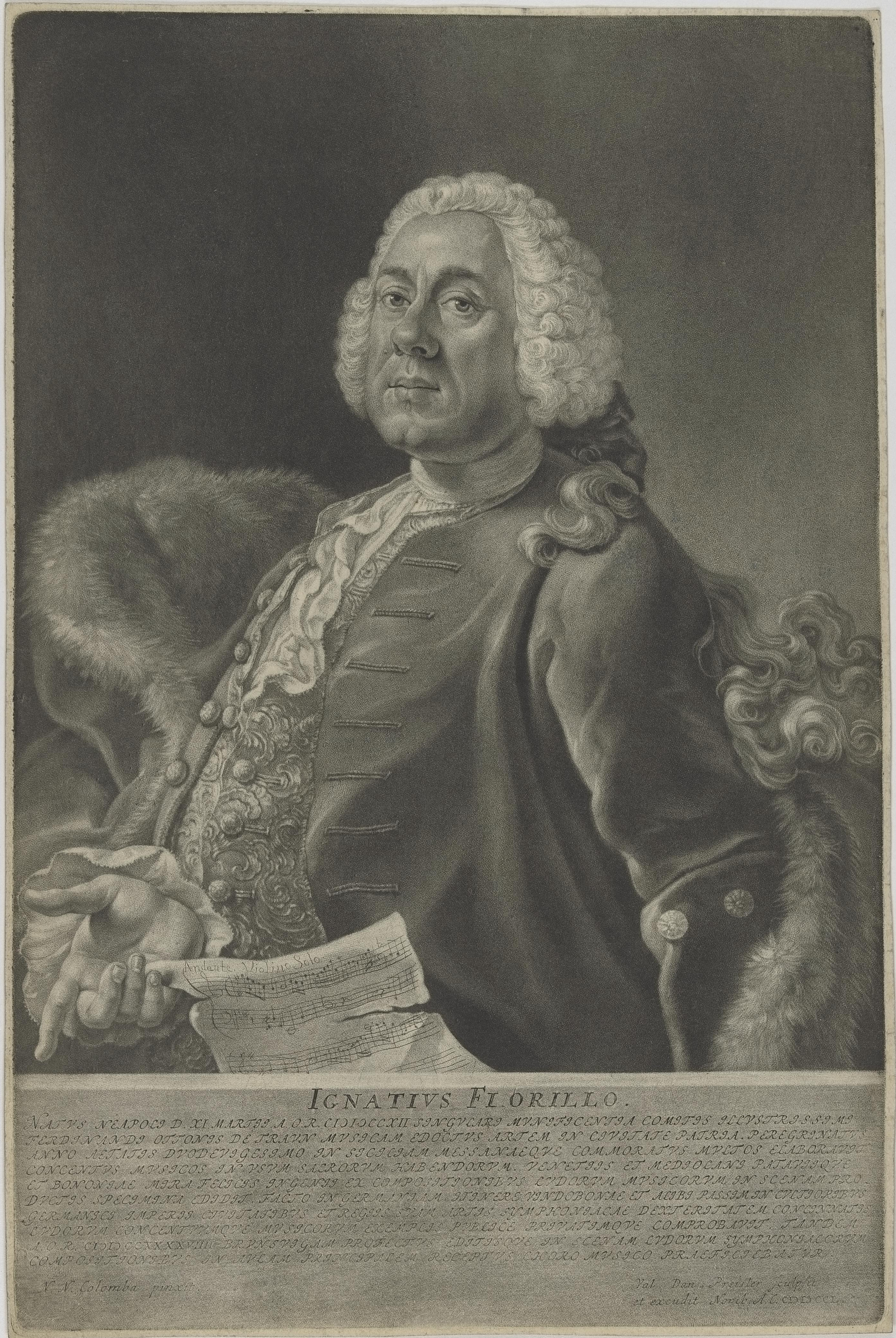
Ignazio Fiorillo

- Hermann of Fritzlar (died after 1349), medieval German mystic
- Saint Wigbert (born in Wessex 670, buried 747 in Fritzlar), disciple of Saint Boniface
- Herbort of Fritzlar (flourished around 1190), cleric and writer, German-speaking poet of the Middle Ages
- Witta of Büraburg (born around 700, died after 760), bishop of Büraburg from 741 to 747
- Ignazio Fiorillo (born 1715 in Naples, died 1787 in Fritzlar), composer
- Bettina von Arnim (1785–1859), writer, studied at Fritzlar's Ursuline School from 1794 to 1797
- Reiner Schöne (born 1942), actor, singer, songwriter and author
- Kazimiera Kulej Śliwa (born 1946), director of WPBP N1 of Wrocław
