= Saint Peter's Church, Fritzlar =

Saint Peter's Church
- Fritzlarer Dom
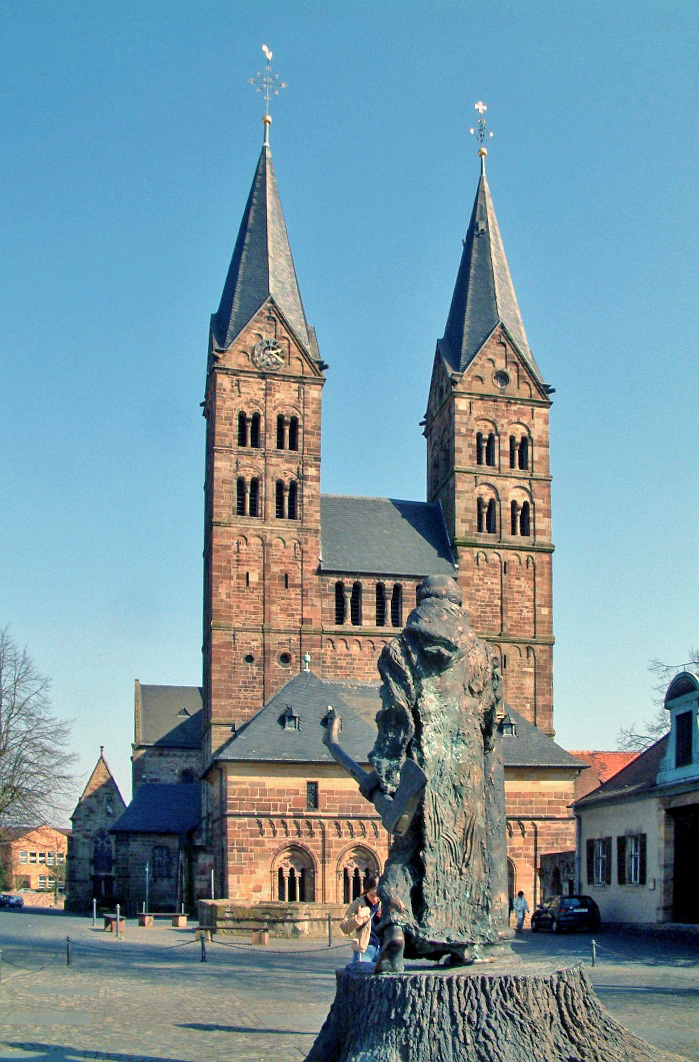
- The westwerk, with statue of St. Boniface in the foreground

- Location within Hesse Location within Germany
- 51°07′51″N 9°16′26″E
- Location: Fritzlar
- Country: Germany
- Denomination: Roman Catholic

History
- Status: Minor Basilica
- Dedication: Saint Peter

Architecture
- Architectural type: Basilica
- Style: Romanesque, Gothic
- Groundbreaking: 1085/90 (current building)

Administration
- Diocese: Diocese of Fulda
- Parish: Domgemeinde

Clergy
- Pastor: Jörg-Stefan Schütz

Saint Peter's Church (German: St. Peterskirche) is a Roman Catholic church and minor basilica located in the small German town of Fritzlar. It is often colloquially referred to as a cathedral (German: Fritzlarer Dom), due to its great size.

== History ==
=== Earlier structures ===
A first Christian place of worship at Frideslar was built by Boniface around 723, reportedly from the wood of an oak tree devoted to Donar. A church and monastery followed in ca. 732 under Wigbert. None of these buildings have left any archaeological traces yet discovered, so the first concrete evidence is for a larger church that was built around the year 800 featuring a transept width of around 24 m and a total length of 24 m.

The church at Fritzlar was destroyed by the forces of Rudolf of Rheinfelden in 1079 during his confrontation with Emperor Henry IV. An early attempt at rebuilding was soon abandoned.

=== Current church ===
The current church was started around 1085/90 as a High Romanesque basilica. It was likely finished in 1118.

Between 1171 and 1232 a late Romanesque renovation followed. The roof truss above the choir was finished in 1194. The next stage of work already took place in the transitional period from the Romanesque to the Gothic: Between 1253 and 1276, the narthex also known as Paradies, was added. The two fully Gothic southern side aisles date to 1290 to 1323. The Gothic Marienkapelle was constructed in 1354-65/6.

The (half-timbered) chapter hall was built on top of the northeastern crypt around 1560. The rood screen was replaced by a wrought-iron lattice in 1692. A simplified, low-ceilinged upper floor was added to the narthex in 1731, a porch was constructed at the northern portal in 1735. From 1799 to 1828 the high central tower was demolished and replaced by a lower pyramidical tower.

In 1868, a storm caused the southern tower spire to collapse during a mass, killing 21 and injuring 31 people. The spires and pediments of both western towers were then rebuilt around 1873 in Romanesque Revival style.

Comprehensive renovation/repairs occurred in 1913-20 and 1963-70. In 1974, the church museum was opened.

In 2004, Pope John Paul II made the church a Minor Basilica. Another renovation of the church interior took place 2010-12. In December 2012 it was reopened to the public.

== Description ==
=== Church building ===
The current building is a combination of Romanesque and Gothic as well as later features, but in its current form retains the general external appearance of a Romanesque basilica. Original structures from this period include the main and north crypt, the walls of the transept, the core of the outer wall of the northern aisle, the polygonal choir apsis, the long choir, nave and the arched ceiling.

The furnishing is a more eclectic mix of styles. Interior features include a large crucifix from ca. 1300, a Baroque baptismal font (1693) and pulpit (1696), altars from 1703 (Reliquienaltar), 1680s/1690s (high altar) and the 1970s (Pfarraltar).

=== Bells ===
No.	Name	Year	Caster	Diameter (mm)	Weight (kg)	Note (16tel)	Tower
1	Martin	1972	Petit & Gebr. Edelbrock	1715	3416	ais^{0} +3	South
2	Große Osanna	1466	Meister Goswin	1709	~3400	cis^{1} −1	North
3	Große Maria	1412	Henrich Heistirboum	1475	~2150	d^{1} +4	North
4	Wigbert	1972	Petit & Gebr. Edelbrock	1140	1084	fis^{1} +4	South
5	Kleine Osanna	1456	Meister Goswin	1125	~980	gis^{1} +7	South
6	Bonifatius	1685	Johannes Schirnbein	910	~480	ais^{1} +11	South
7	Kleine Maria	1456	Meister Goswin	707	~270	eis^{2} +5	North
8	Tertia	1369	Meister Johannes	627	~190	fis^{2} +7	North
