= Gudensberg =

- Town
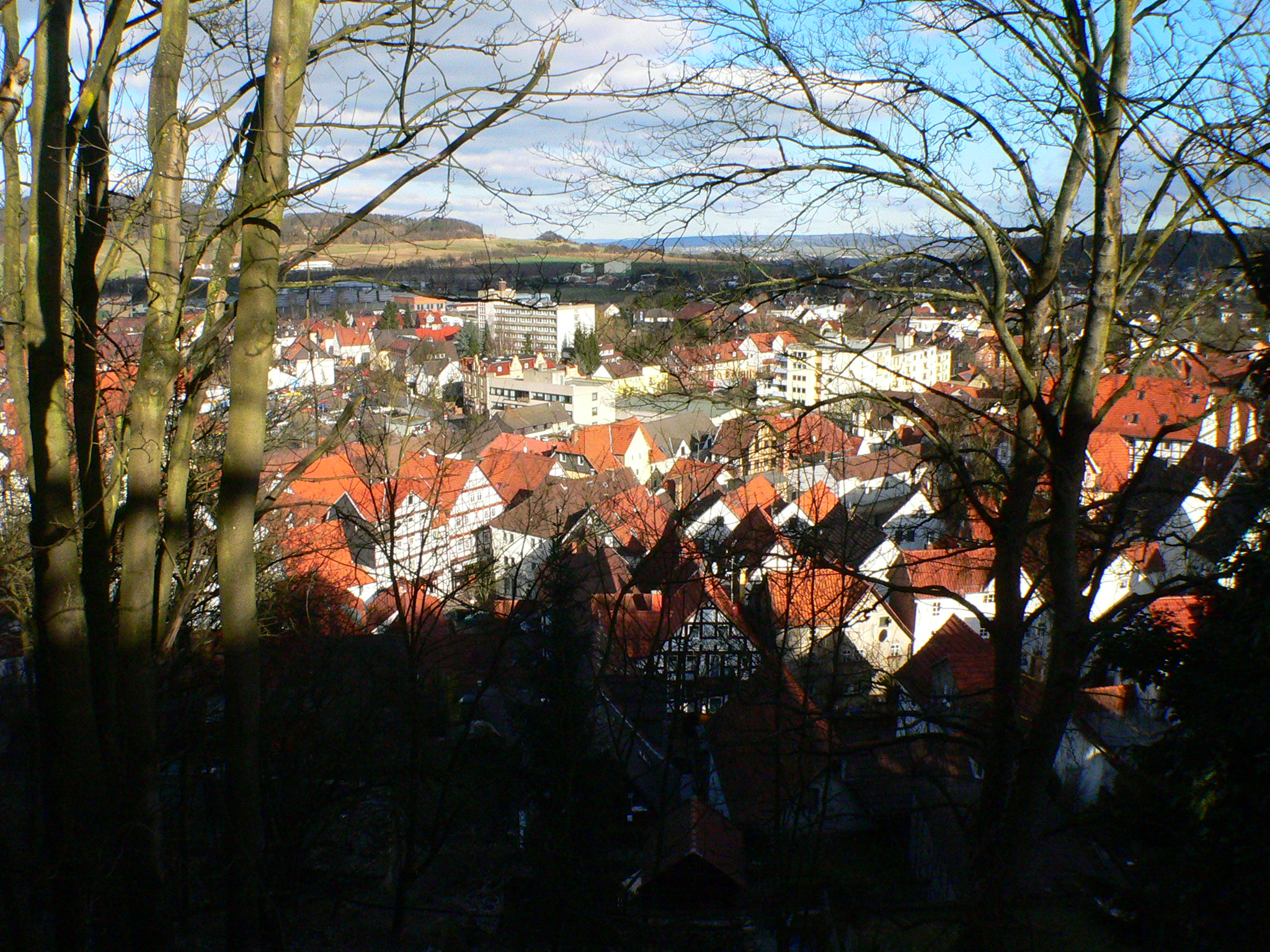
- View of Gudensburg from above

- Coat of arms

- Location of Gudensberg within Schwalm-Eder-Kreis district
- Interactive map of Gudensberg
- Location within Germany Location within Hesse
- Coordinates: 51°11′N 09°22′E
- Country: Germany
- State: Hesse
- Admin. region: Kassel
- District: Schwalm-Eder-Kreis
- Subdivisions: 7 Stadtteile

Government
  - Mayor (2021–27): Sina Best

Area
  - Total: 46.49 km^{2} (17.95 sq mi)
- Elevation: 228 m (748 ft)

Population (2025-12-31)
  - Total: 9,873
  - Density: 212.4/km^{2} (550.0/sq mi)
- Time zone: UTC+01:00 (CET)
  - Summer (DST): UTC+02:00 (CEST)
- Postal codes: 34281
- Dialling codes: 05603
- Vehicle registration: HR, FZ, MEG, ZIG
- Website: www.gudensberg.de

Gudensberg (German pronunciation: [ˈɡuːdn̩sˌbɛʁk]) is a small town in northern Hesse, Germany. Since the municipal reform in 1974, the nearby villages of Deute, Dissen, Dorla, Gleichen, Maden, and Obervorschütz have become parts of the municipality.

== Geography ==
Gudensberg is situated in the district of Schwalm-Eder-Kreis, Hesse, Germany, at the southeasternmost edge of the Habichtswald Nature Park, about 20 km (12 mi) south of Kassel and 10 km (6.2 mi) northeast of Fritzlar.

The town's municipal area borders to the north and northeast on Edermünde, to the east on constituent communities of Felsberg which lie along the lower reaches of the river Eder. South and southeast of the river Ems lie further parts of Felsberg. To the south, southwest, and west are constituent communities of Fritzlar. To the northwest, Gudensberg's community of Gleichen abuts Niedenstein; in this direction, behind the Odenberg (elevation = 381 m (1,250 ft)), rise the Langenberge, (a low mountain range), that belong to the Habichtswald Nature Park.

== History ==
=== Gudensberg ===
In the area around Gudensberg, many prehistoric and early historic finds have shown that the area was inhabited by people now known as the Chatti. On the Lamsberg, finds from the Rössen culture have been unearthed. In 1938, between the Odenberg and Gudensberg, a Linear Pottery culture settlement from about 4000 BC and an Iron Age settlement were discovered. At the Kassler Kreuz, a graveyard with cremated remains from about 1000 BC was discovered when a railway was built in 1899.

In the 10th century, the Hof Wodensberg, a farm in Gudensberg, was run using three-field crop rotation. Gudensberg itself had its first mention in documents in 1121. The town's name is presumably derived from an older form, Wotansberg, after the god Wōdanaz, who was worshiped as the highest god by the Chatti in Old Germanic times. In the Middle Ages, a castle was built on the hill and was named the Obernburg. It was the seat of Hessian regional counts (Gaugrafen). From 1122 to 1247, Gudensberg belonged to the Landgraves of Thuringia, and the place experienced its heyday, with its first town wall built between 1170 and 1180, and its first mention as a town in 1254 with a town constitution at the turn of the 13th century.

With the partition of Thuringia, Gudensberg fell to the Landgraviate of Hesse, and in 1277, Henry I was proclaimed the first Landgrave of Hesse on the Mader Heide (heath) near Gudensberg. In 1300, Landgrave Henry I moved his residence from Gudensberg to Kassel and Gudensberg lost its political and administrative importance. In 1324, however, Gudensberg was still being mentioned as the "Capital of Nyderlandt". In 1365, the Hospital Heiliger Geist (Holy Ghost Hospital) for lepers was founded.

In the many feuds between the Archbishopric of Mainz and the Landgraviate of Hesse, Gudensberg was one of Hesse's main bases and repeatedly suffered damage as a result. In 1387, Gudensberg and the Wenigenburg (castle) —– but not the Obernburg —– were sacked by troops from Mainz. Fiery catastrophes befell the town a number of times. In 1587, the town was laid waste through carelessness. In 1640, during the Thirty Years' War, the town was sacked by Imperial troops; in this plundering, the philosopher and theologian Daniel Angelocrater lost all his belongings.

Tilly convened a Landtag of Hessian towns in Gudensberg in 1626. In 1709, Landgrave Karl of Hesse-Kassel (or Hesse-Cassel) organized excavations in the Mader Heide which brought to light remnants of Iron Age settlements. In the Seven Years' War, the still partly preserved Obernburg was heavily damaged by bombardment in 1761 by British troops under John Manners's leadership. In 1806, French troops plundered and thoroughly destroyed what was left of the Obernburg. The town gates were torn down because they were a traffic hazard in 1823.

=== Deute ===
Deute's first mention in documents goes back to 1314. A house dating from 1665 is still standing today. In the 18th century, there was a working brown coal mine in Deute.

=== Dissen ===
Dissen's first mention in documents goes back to 1061.

=== Dorla ===
Dorla, which lies on the Ems, had its first mention in documents in 1040. The village church was consecrated in 1718.

=== Maden ===
At the time when the Chatti lived in the area, Maden was a main town, and at the Mader Stein they held their things. Maden's first mention as Mathanon in pago Hassorum comes from about 800 in the Bresiarium Lulli, making Maden one of Hesse's oldest villages (at least by the measure of documentary mention) and in 2000 it celebrated 1225 years of existence. In 1046, Maden was mentioned as Madanum, in 1061 as Madena and in 1295 as major Maden. Emperor Otto I, the Great, awarded Maden to the Archbishop of Mainz.

Count Werner IV of Maden founded the Benedictine Monastery of Breitenau near Guxhagen in 1113. After Werner's death in 1121, rule and ownership rights passed to Count Giso IV from the Burg Hollende. Lower jurisdiction was held as of the 14th century by Alb. Lugelin, Gerlach von Linne and the von Holzsadel family.

Maden was the Seat of the County of Hesse. In 1325 it was called: "County and state court of Hesse, that one calls the court of Maden". The Wodanstein in Maden was first mentioned in 1408.

Between Maden and Gudensberg lies the historically important Mader Heide (heath).

=== Obervorschütz ===
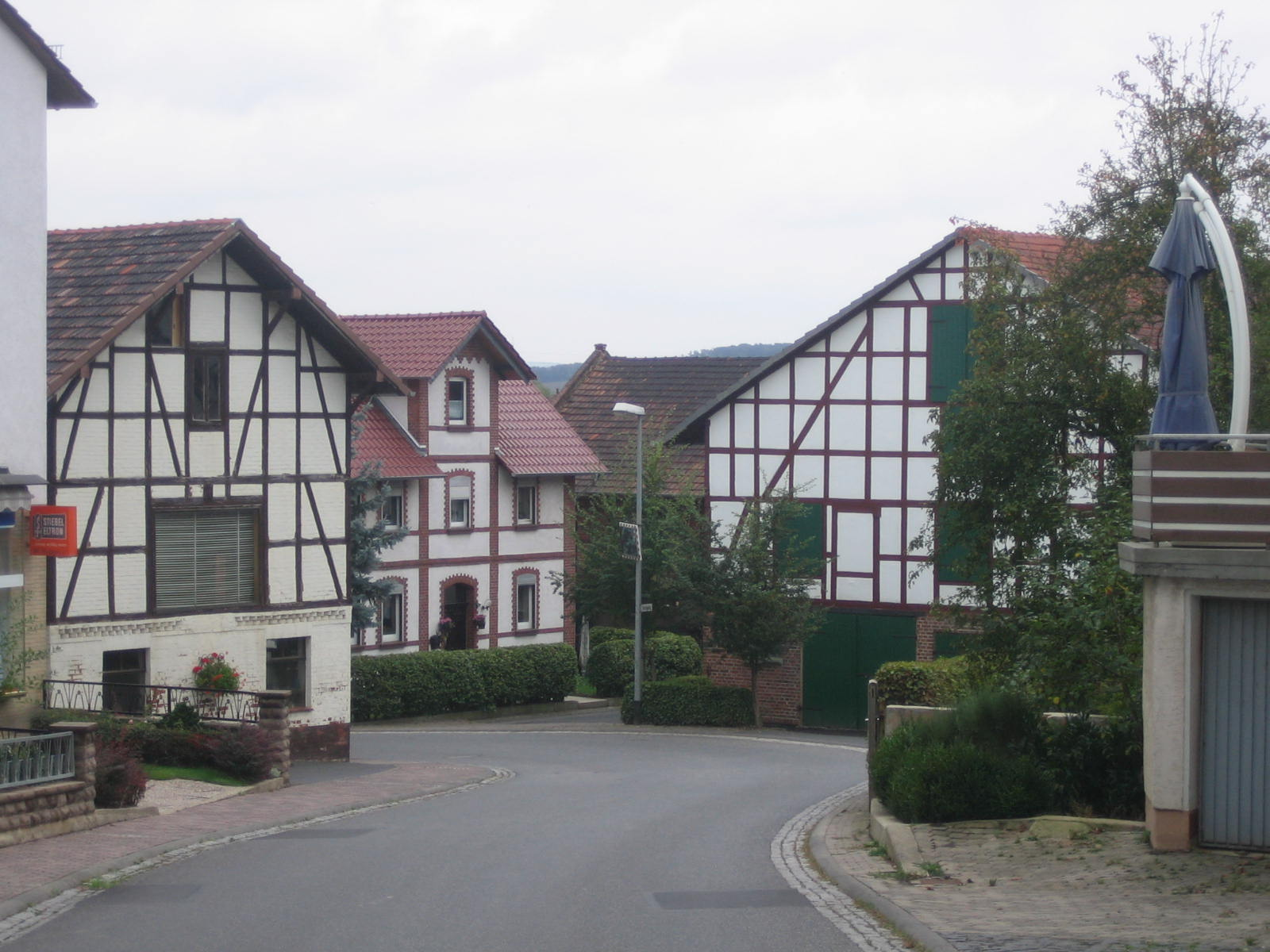
Half-timbered houses in Obervorschütz

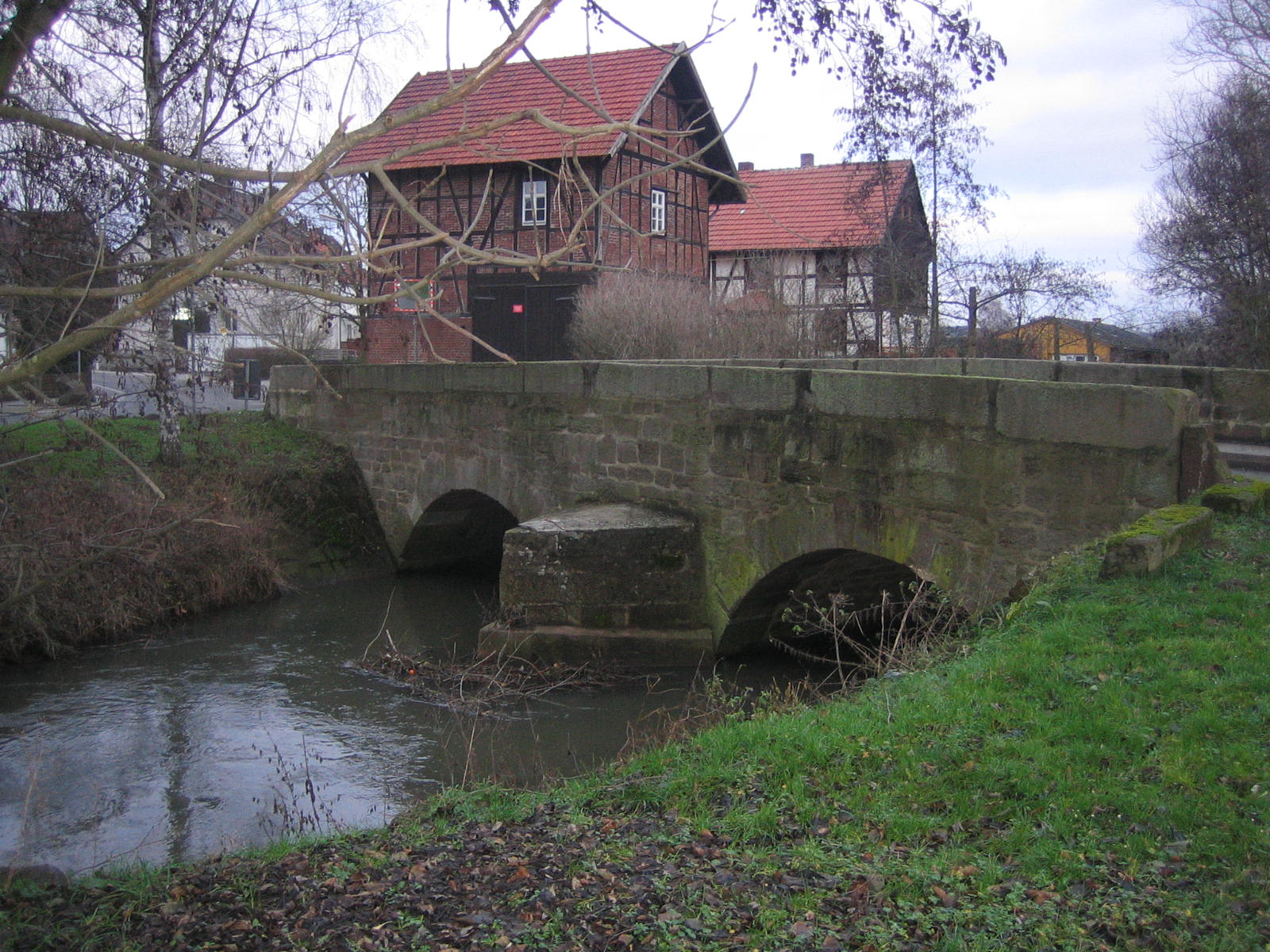
Bridge over the Emsbach in Obervorschütz

The find of a stone axe in the area bears witness to a very early culture settling in the Obervorschütz area about 3000 BC. A late-Roman era metalwork find was a Roman belt mount bearing Germanic imagery indicating a skilled artisan in the area. However, the village's first documentary mention, under the name Burrisuzze, did not come until 1074. It was later mentioned in 1275 as villa superior Vorskutheund and in 1357 as Obirm Vorschütz.

== Politics ==
=== Town Council ===
The Town Council consists of 31 representatives:

Parties		% 2011	Seats 2011	% 2006	Seats 2006
SPD	SPD	56.8	18	58.4	18
CDU	CDU	24.0	7	27.3	8
GRÜNE	Greens	14.7	5	8.5	3
FDP	FDP	4.4	1	5.8	2
Total		100.0	31	100.0	31
Voter turnout in %		51.6		50.8	

== Culture and sightseeing ==
=== Buildings ===
Above the town, on the Schlossberg, lie the ruins of the old castle, the Obernburg. On a saddle below the Obernburg, a tower that was part of the town's old defences still stands. From the 306 m (1,004 ft) high hill there is an outstanding view across the heath, to the Mader Stein, to the Nenkel and to the Odenberg (and other mountains).

Various historic buildings are to be found in the town core, mostly half-timbered houses, among them the old Amtshaus with its Renaissance porch, the rectory from 1642, the Renthof built in 1643, and the town's oldest building, the Ackerbürgerhaus, built in 1596. The Evangelical church St. Margarete is a Gothic structure from the 14th century, with additions and renovations dating to the 15th and 16th centuries. On Kasseler Strasse, at the corner of Fritzlarer Strasse, is the Hospital of the Holy Ghost, founded in 1365 for lepers, but renovated many times up until the 18th century. Also in the Old Town is the Old Cemetery with historic gravestones from the 18th and 19th centuries. The Classicist town hall dates from 1839. The handsome synagogue built between 1840 and 1843 was closed in 1937 and gradually fell into disrepair until it was bought by the city in 1991, thoroughly renovated, and inaugurated as a cultural center in 1995.

Of interest is a horse hoof print on a stone in the churchyard wall. It is said that Charlemagne's horse made this mark when it stamped on this stone in the now-abandoned village of Karlskirchen, after his rider had just fought a battle there. The legend has it that the horse created the Glisborn in doing so, or though previous legends exist as well.

=== Natural monuments ===
Dissen's most notable landmark is a basalt knoll, the Scharfenstein, which attracts a lot of climbers because of the difficult and varied climbs available. There is also a gallery grave. Less notable, but legendary, is the Glisborn (or sometimes called Glißborn), a spring north of the Scharfenstein that was a holy place to the Chatti, who believed it had healing powers, and that it was of godly origins. In the Gudensberg Town Forest lies the Lautarius Grave, an archaeological site from the New Stone Age, built by the Wartberg culture.

Scenic mountaintops near Gudensberg include the Mader Stein at the edge of the Maden Heath (Mader Heide), the Odenberg, the Nenkel and the Wartberg.

== Economy and infrastructure ==
=== Transport ===
Gudensberg lies on Autobahn A 49. An express busline joins Gudensberg with Kassel and Fritzlar, and at times with Bad Wildungen and Frankenberg.

=== Grifte-Gudensberger Kleinbahn ===
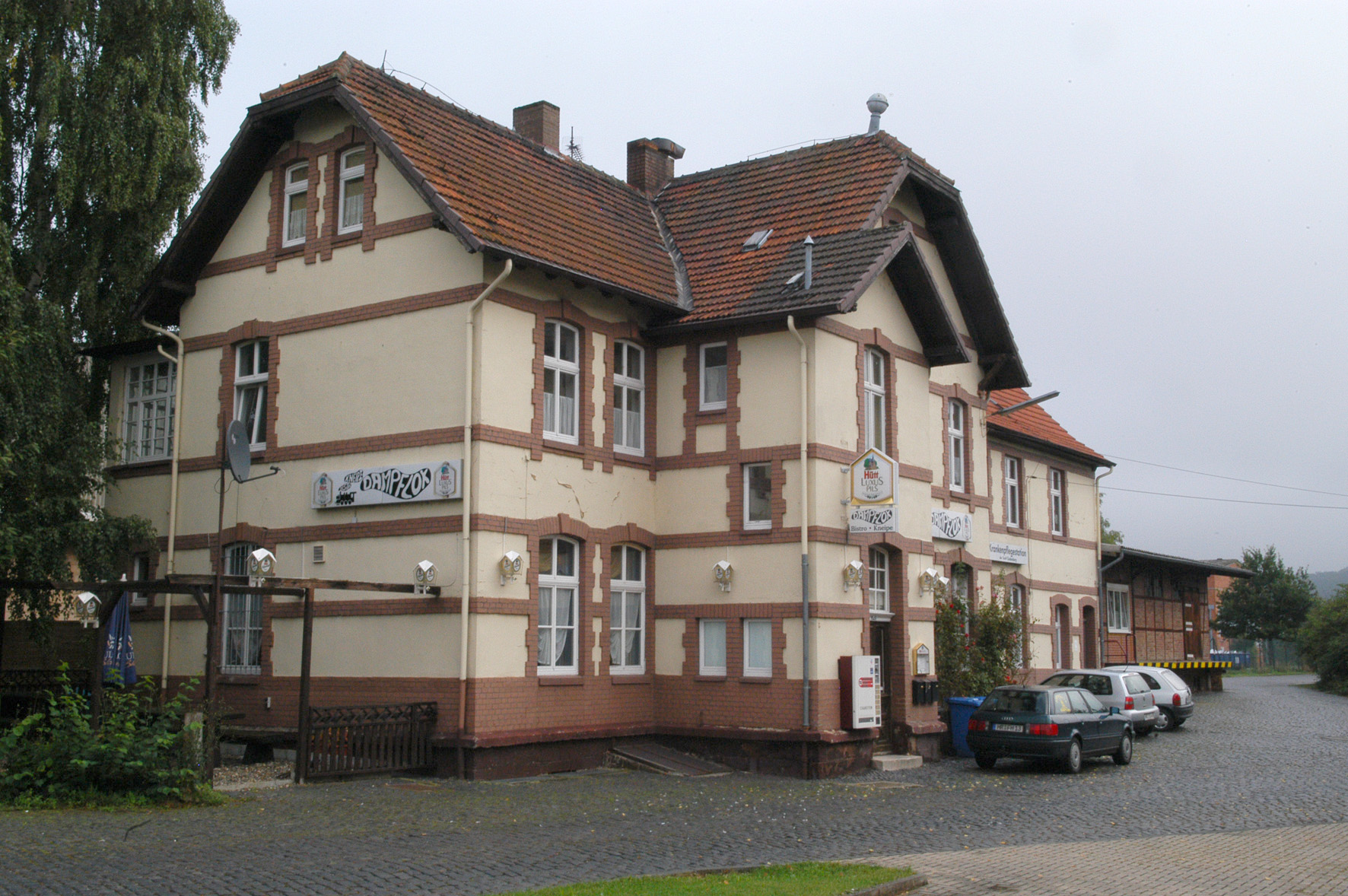
Gudensberg's former railway station (2005)

The Kleinbahn was a "small" railway, small in the operational sense; the track was standard gauge and the trains full-sized. Work on it began in 1898, and the 7.72 km (4.80 mi) long line, with four stations was opened on 15 July 1899. The service ran as follows:

- Grifte, 0.00 km
- Haldorf, 2.58 km
- Dissen, 4.25 km
- Gudensberg, 7.72 km

Passenger services on the line were terminated on 31 December 1954. Thereafter, only a packaging machine manufacturer from Gudensberg used the line to ship his wares, and even then only weekly. The tracks were removed in 1980, and the railway embankment is nowadays used as a cycling and hiking path.

=== Established businesses ===
Dupon Biscuits, GTS Stanztechnik, Weber Netze, DPD Lager 34, and Stolle.

== Education ==
The town has three kindergartens, two primary schools (one of which is in Obervorschütz), one comprehensive school with a school observatory, a special school and a media centre.

== Sons and daughters of the town ==
- Matthias Beller, chemist
- Matthias Botthof, IFBB Pro
- Regiane Da Silva, IFBB Pro
- Hugo Brunner, librarian and historian
- Daniel Angelocrater, theologian
- Ulrich Sonnemann, philosopher
- Conrad Mel, theologian and pedagogue
- Helmut Reitze, journalist
- Thomas Freudenstein, footballer
- Otto Kastl, footballer
- Heinrich Reuter (1905–1984), painter
- Bernd Siebert, politician and Member of the German Bundestag and Landtag of Hesse

== Literature ==
- Eduard Brauns: Wander- und Reiseführer durch Nordhessen und Waldeck, A. Bernecker Verlag, Melsungen 1971, S.303.
- Eckhart G. Franz: Chronik von Hessen. Chronik-Verlag, Dortmund 1991. ISBN 3-611-00192-9.
