= Wotanstein (Hesse) =

Megalith located in the village of Maden, Germany

- Wotanstein
- Wodanstein
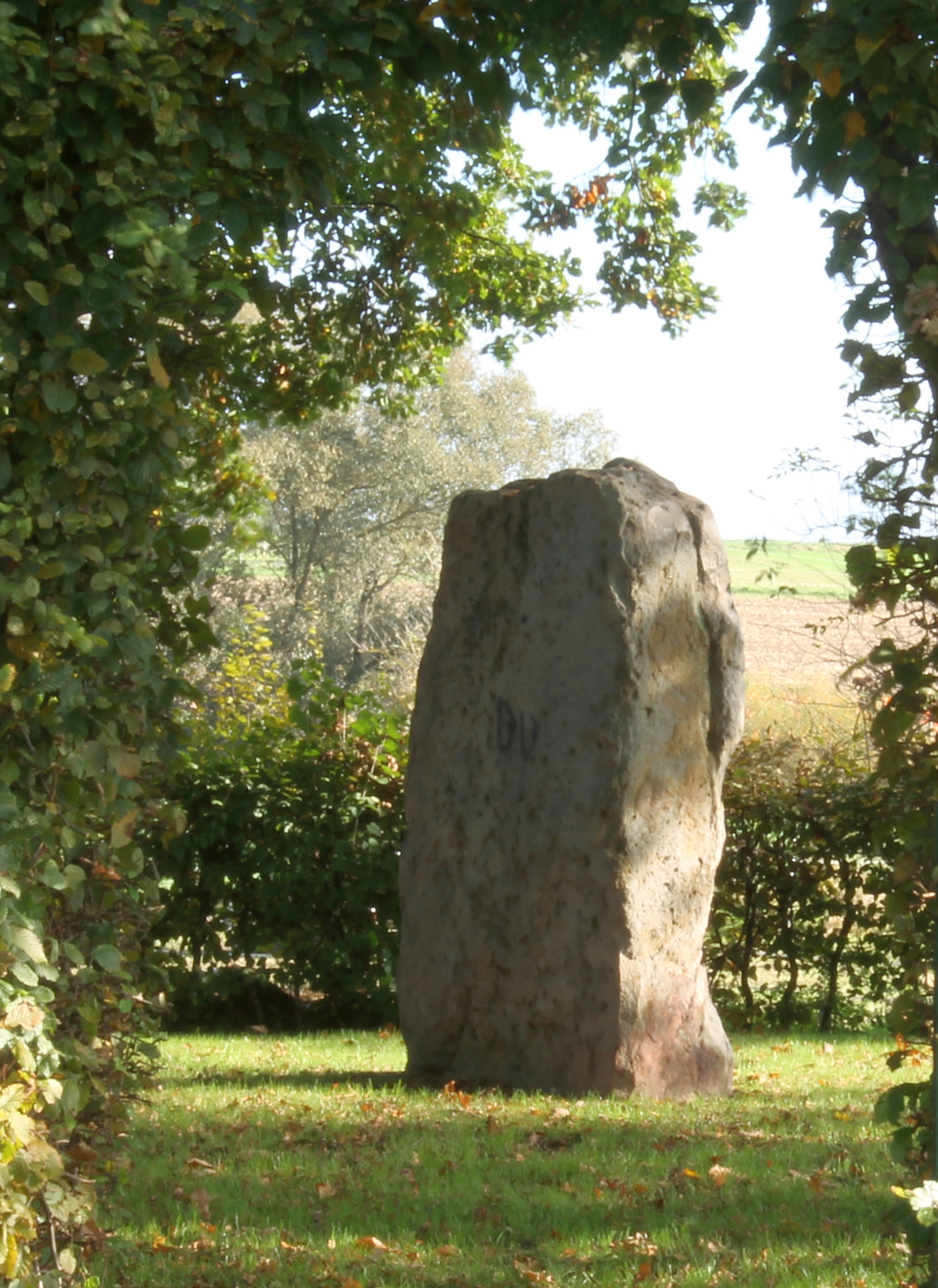
- Wotanstein, a megalith near Maden, Hesse

- Location within Hesse
- 51°9′48″N 9°22′13″E
- Type: megalith
- Location: Maden, Hesse, Germany

Site notes
- Material: Tertiary quartzite
- Height: 2.12 m (6 ft 11 in)
- Length: 1.2 m (3 ft 11 in)
- Width: 0.55 m (1 ft 10 in)
- Public access: yes

The Wotanstein (English: Wotan's stone), also known as 'Wodanstein' or earlier on 'Malstein', is a small megalith or menhir situated close to the village of Maden, Schwalm-Eder-Kreis, Hesse, Germany.

== Geographical location ==
The megalith is situated on the south-west corner of the village of Maden, on an elevation between the streams of the Goldbach to the east and Henkelborn to the west. The land on which it stands has an elevation of 177 m (581 ft). It is on the east side of the road that goes to Obervorschütz.

== Composition, dimensions, and geometry ==
The stone is c. 2.12 m (6 ft 11 in) high, 1.2 m (3 ft 11 in) wide, and 0.55 m (1 ft 10 in) thick. The above-ground volume is thus 1.4 m^{3} (49 cu ft) and given quartzite has a density of 2,648 kg/m^{3} (4,463 lb/cu yd), the above-ground stone weighs c. 3.7 metric tons (3.6 long tons). For comparison, the above-ground mass of Riesenstein near Wolfershausen is ten times more. The excavation during the Seven Years' War (see below) discovered the stone is as deep underground as it is high above-ground. Therefore, its mass is closer to c. 7.5 metric tons (7.4 long tons).

It is composed of Neogene Miocene (from 23 million years ago to 8 million years ago) quartzite. In contrast to quartzites produced by metamorphism, the Tertiary sedimentary quartzites were the product of intense weathering of local Triassic Buntsandstein sandstones in a tropical climate. The quartzite does not locally outcrop (the next outcrops are near Fritzlar, Borken and Melsungen), so that the stone must have been brought to this place and erected.

The stone's longest horizontal axis strikes N065 ± 5° and it stands vertically. Therefore, the largest faces are directed towards c. 155°, i.e. south-south-east and 335°, north-north-west.

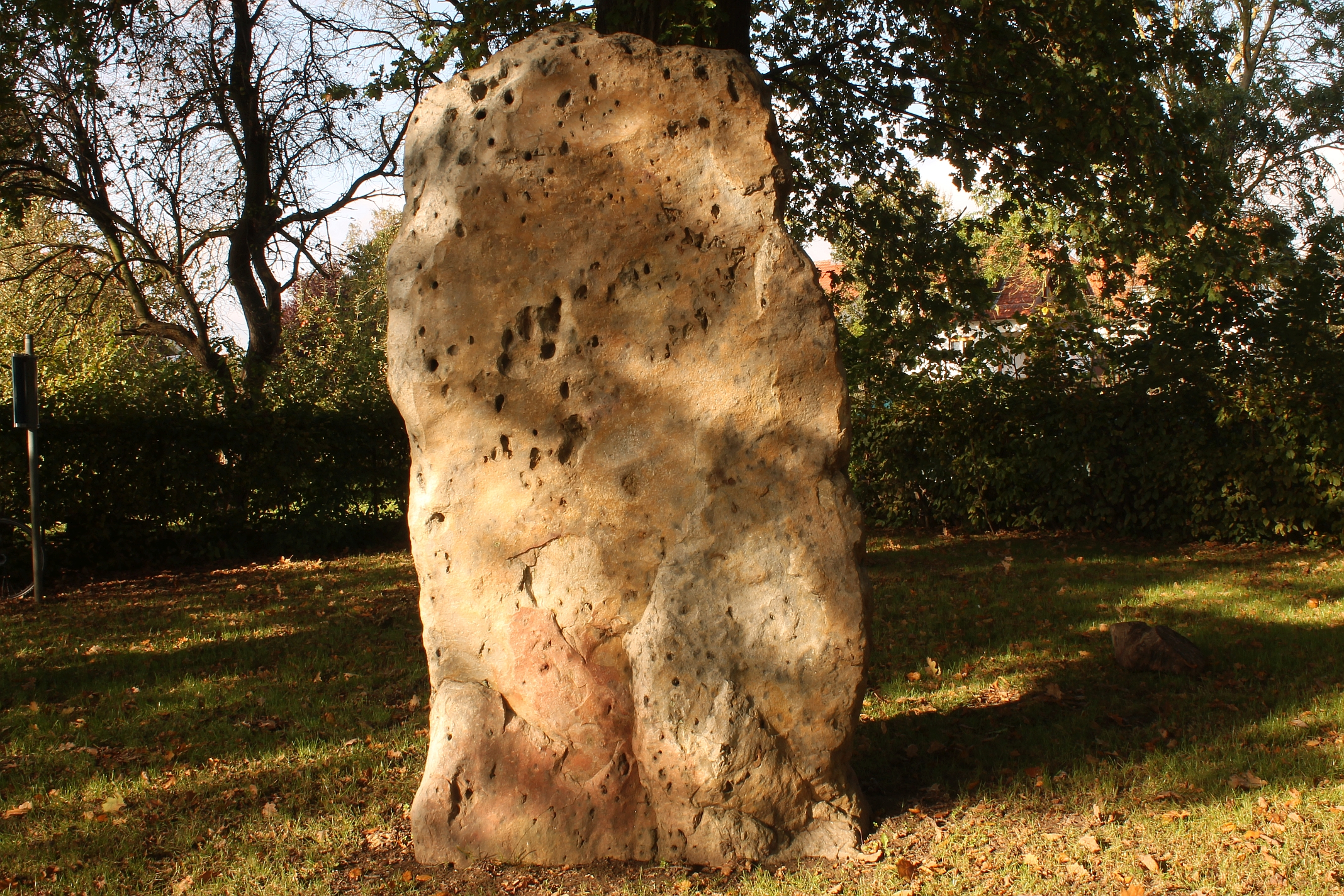
Wotanstein from the southeast, showing the marks said to be made by the devil's claws

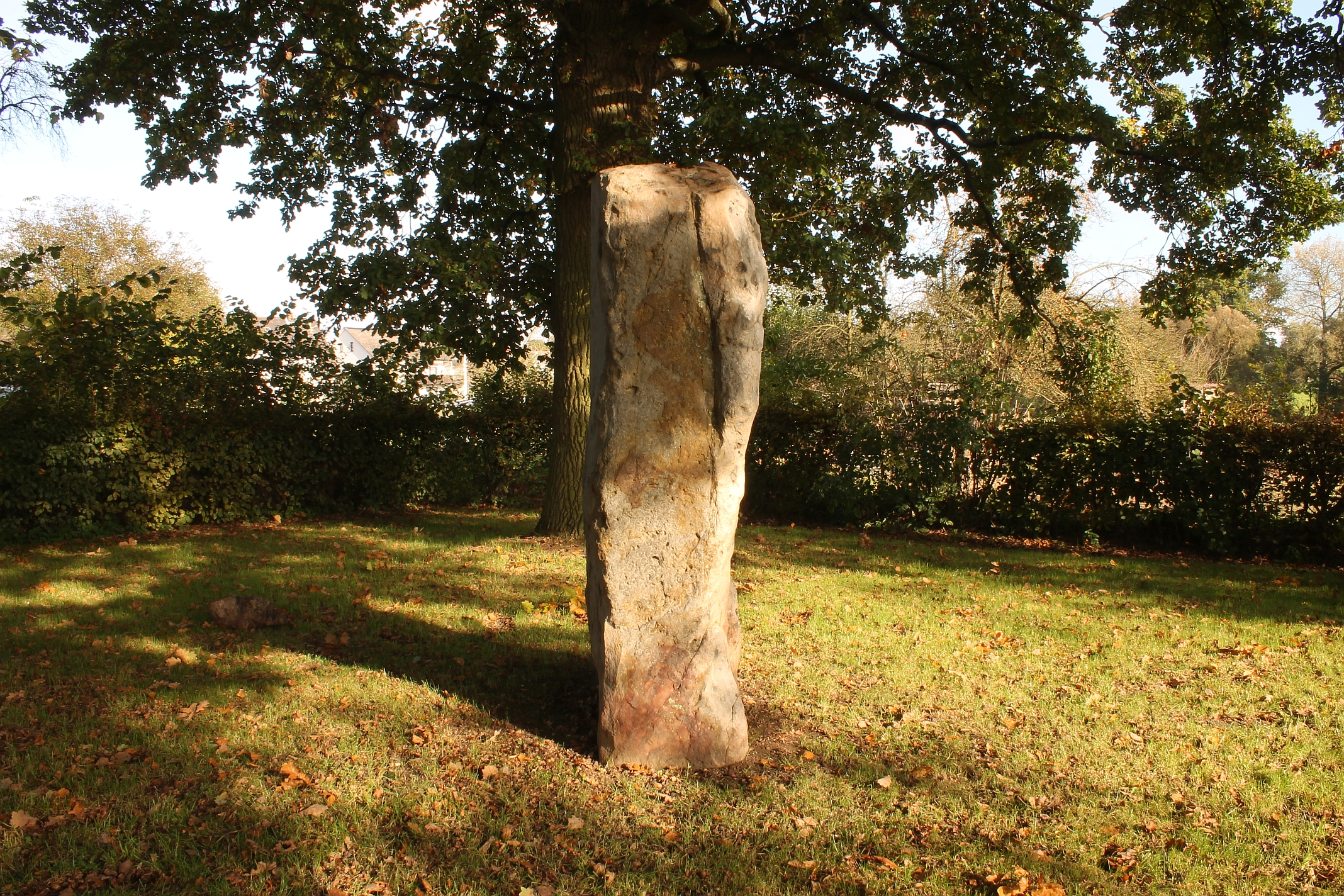
Wotanstein from the southwest, showing the thickness of 55 cm and bedding planes of the quartzite

== History ==
It is not known for certain when the megalith was erected or for what reason it was placed in this location. However, it is presumed from finds at other similar megaliths in the area (e.g. Riesenstein) that it was erected in the 3rd century BC.

Later, around the 1st century BC, it was most probably used by the Chatti to worship Odin, known in Old High German as "Wôtan" or "Wodan".

In 1407 the stone was mentioned in documents as deme langen steyne zu Madin (English: the long stone at Madin (Maden)). According to oral tradition, during the Seven Years' War (1756–1763) it was excavated because it was rumoured that treasure was buried under it, but remains of human bones were found instead. They also discovered the stone was as deep as it is high.

== Legend ==
The first Christian church in Fritzlar was built by Saint Boniface from the wood of the Donar's Oak. It is said that the Devil, who lived on Mader Stein (or the nearby Lamsberg hill), wanted to destroy the church with a stone. There are two different versions of the next part:

1. Either the stone caught in his sleeve, or
2. the stone was deflected by the upheld shield of the archangel Michael.

Either way it fell in a field on the onskirts of Maden. The stone was called Wotanstein. The marks and scratches on the stone were caused by the devil's claws.
