= Lullus =

Benedictine monk and missionary (died 786)

Saint Lullus of Mainz
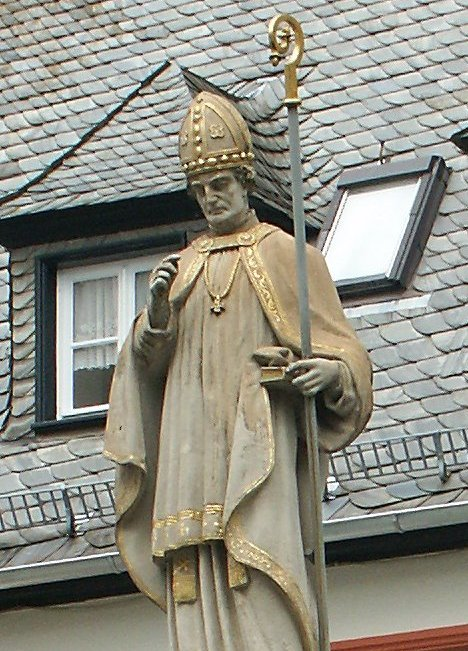
- Statue of Saint Lullus in Bad Hersfeld

Archbishop of Mainz Venerable Missionary
- Born: c. 710; Wessex
- Died: 16 October 786; Hersfeld Abbey
- Venerated in: Eastern Orthodox Church; Roman Catholic Church
- Canonized: 7 April 852
- Feast: 16 October; 1 June

Saint Lullus (also known as Lull or Lul, born AD 710 – died 16 October 786) was the first permanent archbishop of Mainz, succeeding Saint Boniface, and first abbot of the Benedictine Hersfeld Abbey. He is historiographically considered the first official sovereign of the Electorate of Mainz.

== Monk to archbishop ==
Lullus was born in Wessex around AD 710. He was a monk in the Benedictine monastery of Malmesbury Abbey in Wiltshire. His earlier name may have been "Rehdgerus" (possible in a multitude of spellings including Ratkar, Hredgar, Raedgar, etc.). During a pilgrimage to Rome in 737, he met Saint Boniface and decided to join him in his missionary work in northern Germany. In 738, Lullus joined the Benedictine monastery of Fritzlar, founded by Boniface in 732. There, his teacher was abbot Saint Wigbert, who had also come from England.

In 741, Charles Martel died, and in this year the most important phase of Boniface's career started, with Lullus as his closest assistant. Many of the biographical facts about Lullus derive from the Boniface Correspondence: he is attested as a deacon in 745-46, as Boniface's archdeacon in 746-47, and as priest in 751, though he was probably ordained before that. The correspondence evidences that Lullus was trusted enough to be Boniface's messenger (he went to Rome twice on his behalf), including in the secret negotiations over Boniface's successor at Mainz. Lullus exchanged letters (and gifts) with Edburga of Minster-in-Thanet and Leoba, among others. Since he was the youngest of Boniface's associates and was not yet tied to a specific place, he grew to be his closest associate. Moreover, a study by Michael Tangl, cited by Theodor Schieffer, suggests that Boniface, whose eyesight had begun to fail him early in the 740s, may have used Lullus's services in reading and writing the letters that were such an important part of his work. Tangl suspects that Lullus likely cooperated with Boniface on some of the most important letters.

King Pippin confirmed him in 753 as bishop of Mainz, and in 754 he became archbishop, as Saint Boniface resigned and appointed Lullus his successor. Lullus became the first regular archbishop of Mainz when Pope Adrian I granted him the pallium in about 781. He then greatly expanded his bishopric by absorbing those of Büraburg (near Fritzlar) and Erfurt.

== Carolingian era ==
From 769 onward, Lullus promoted the establishment of the Carolingian style monastery of Hersfeld Abbey, which he succeeded in having placed under Charlemagne's Carolingian dynasty protection in 775.

Lullus's chief accomplishment was the completion of Saint Boniface's reform of the church in the Frankish Carolingian Empire and the successful conclusion of the Christianization of the Germans in Hesse-Thuringia. But while Boniface had looked for a close link to Rome, Lullus sought a better understanding with the Frankish kings.

Lullus died on 16 October 786 in Hersfeld Abbey at Bad Hersfeld, and is buried in the church.

== Veneration ==
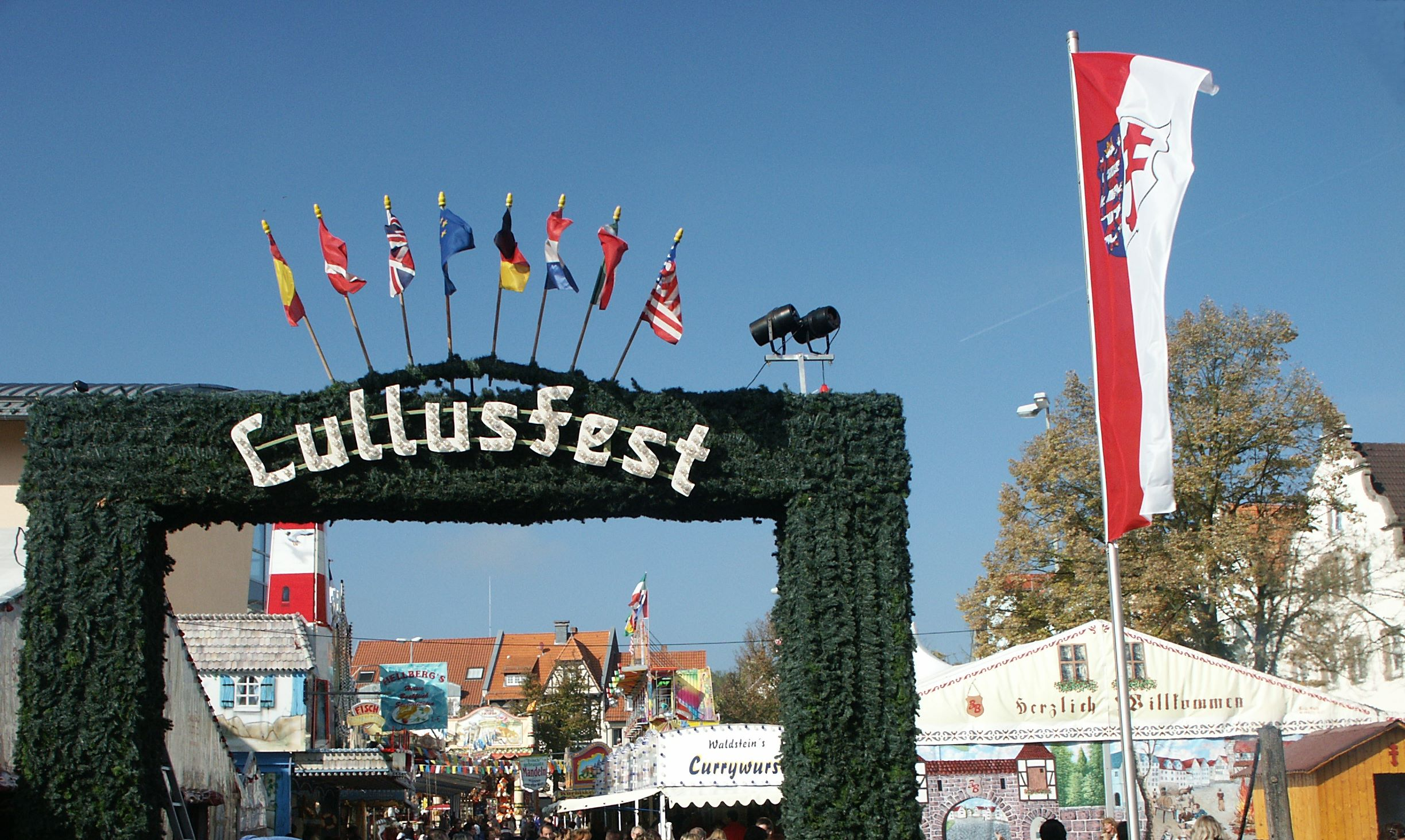
Hersfelder Lullusfest entrance

Lullus was canonized on 7 April 852. He is commemorated with a feast day on 16 October.

The Vita Lulli, written by Lampert of Hersfeld (probably between 1063 and 1073) led to Lullus being venerated as a saint and becoming the main patron of the abbey along with Wigbert.

Lullusfest, the oldest folk festival in Germany, marked its 1,160th birthday in 2012. The festival celebrates the founding of the city of Bad Hersfeld. Founded more than 1,275 years ago, the city still reveres Saint Lullus, who left Malmesbury in the 730s on a mission to convert the German tribes to Christianity.

== See also ==
- List of Carolingian monasteries
- Carolingian Renaissance

Preceded by Saint Boniface	Archbishop of Mainz; 754-786	Succeeded by Richhulf
