= Züschen, Fritzlar =

Coordinates: 51.173°N 9.227°E

Züschen is a village and former city in the municipality of Fritzlar, Schwalm-Eder-Kreis in the German State of Hesse.

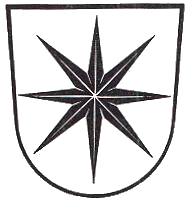
Arms of Züschen

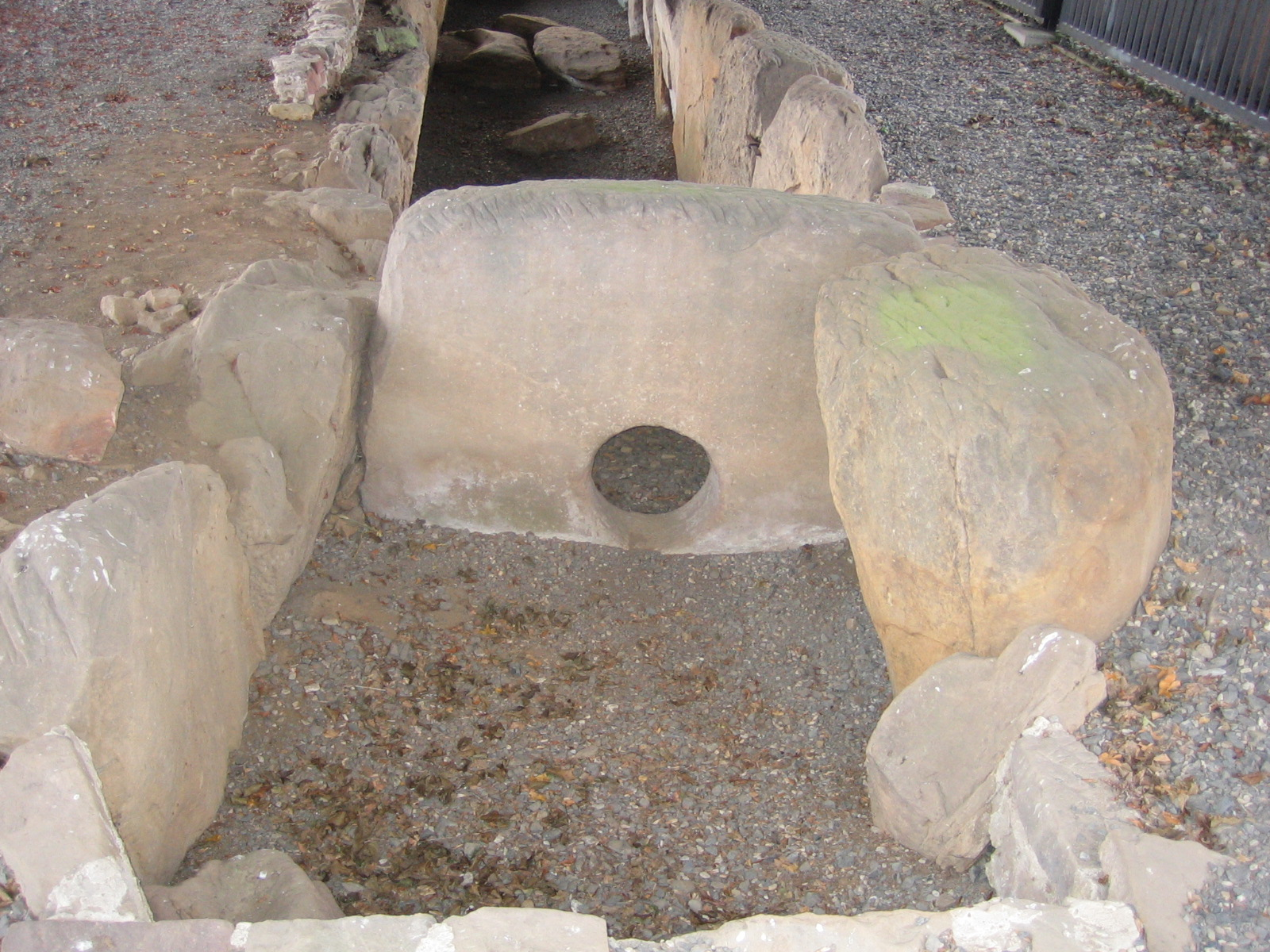
The "Steinkammergrab" (cist) of Züschen

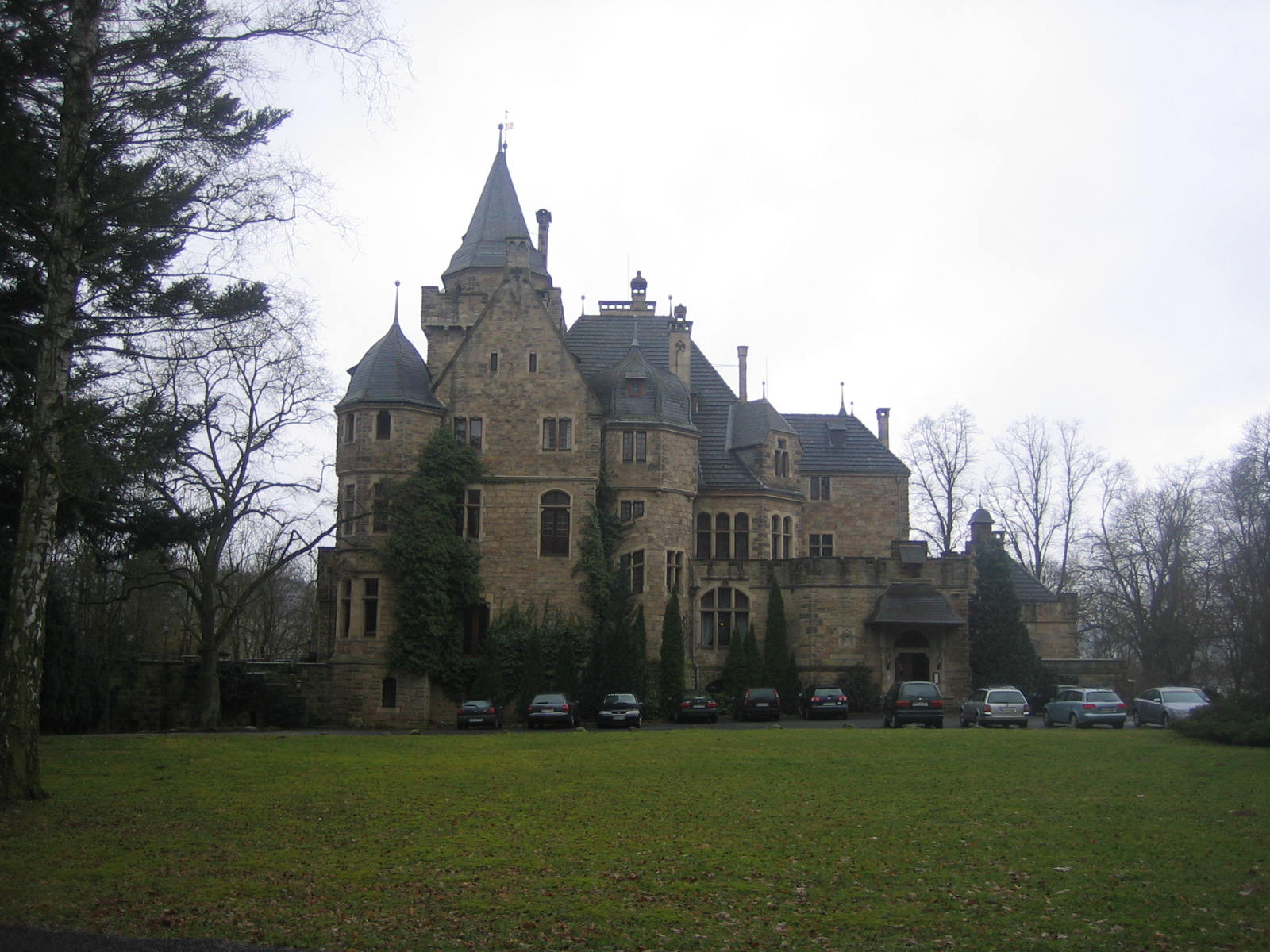
Garvensburg Castle in Züschen
