= Hermann of Fritzlar =

Medieval German mystic

Hermann of Fritzlar was a medieval German mystic and author of a collection of legends, the Buch von der Heiligen Leben (Book of the Lives of the Saints), also known as Das Heiligenleben (The Saints' Life), which was written between 1343 and 1349.
