= Büraberg =

Hill in Germany

- Location within Hesse

Highest point
- Elevation: 275 m (902 ft)
- Coordinates: 51°07′14″N 9°14′11″E

Geography
- Location: Schwalm-Eder-Kreis, Hesse, Germany

The Büraberg is a hill in the county of Schwalm-Eder-Kreis, Hesse, Germany.
