= Scharfenstein (Hesse) =

Mountain in Germany

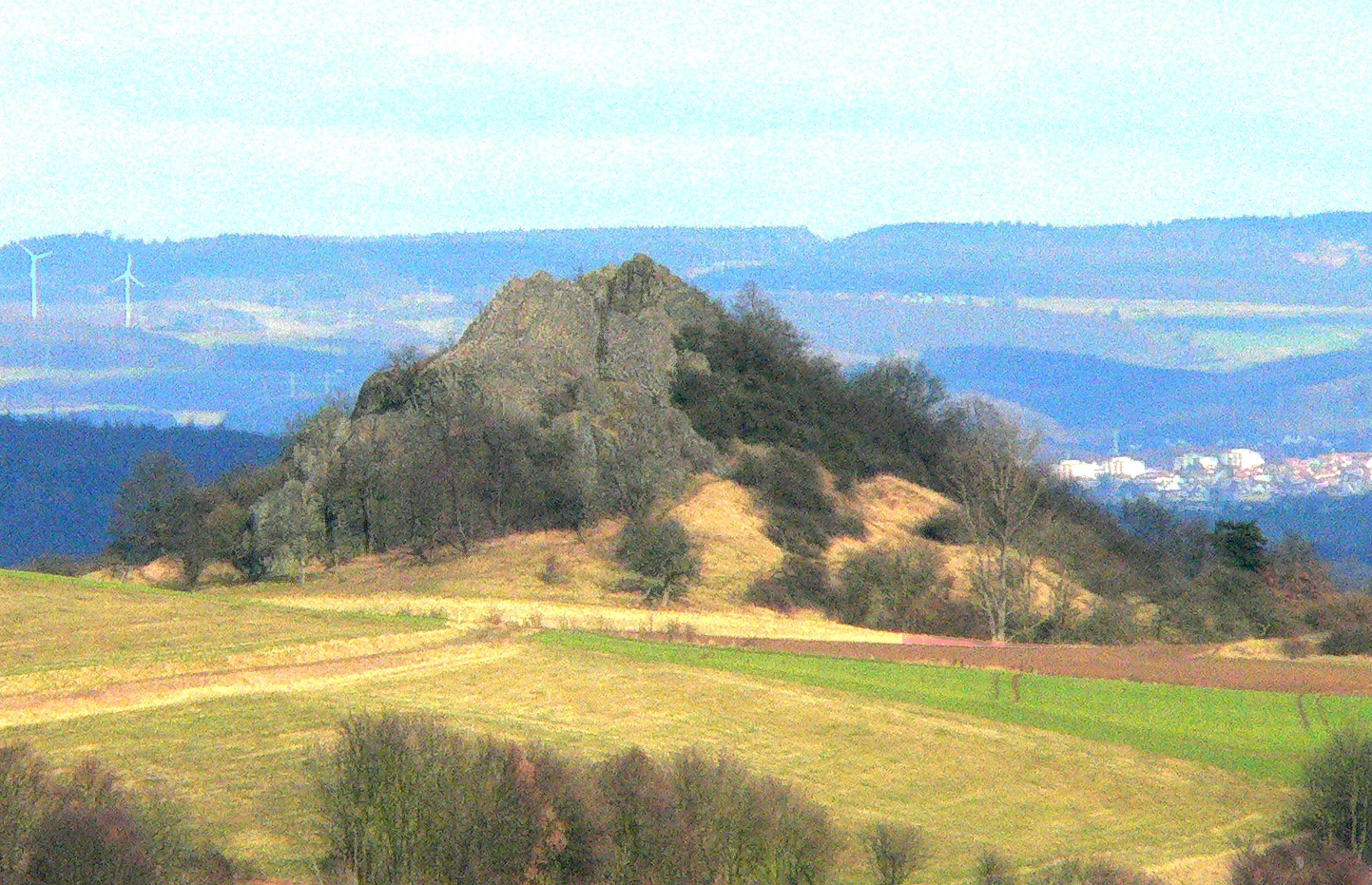
- View of Scharfenstein from Odenberg

Highest point
- Elevation: 304 m (997 ft) Normalhöhennull
- Prominence: 35 m (115 ft)
- Isolation: 1.2 km (0.75 mi) Odenberg
- Coordinates: 51°11′32″N 9°23′34″E

Geography
- Location within Germany
- Location: Schwalm-Eder-Kreis, Hesse, Germany

Geology
- Rock age: Miocene
- Mountain type: extinct volcano
- Volcanic zone: West Hesse Depression

Scharfenstein is a 304 metres (997 ft) hill composed of basalt in the Schwalm-Eder-Kreis district of North Hesse, Germany. It is the remains of one of a number of extinct volcanoes in the West Hesse Depression.

== Geographical Location ==
Scharfenstein lies ca. 2.5 kilometres (1.6 mi) north-east of the town centre of Gudensberg, and ca. 1 kilometre (0.62 mi) west-south-west of the village of Dissen. Directly next to it runs the Bundesautobahn 49, and the hill can be reached from a car park off the autobahn. Alternatively the outcrop can be reached on foot from Dissen by crossing a bridge over the autobahn.

== Geology ==
The hill is the remains of an extinct volcano that belongs to the West Hesse Depression. The volcano was active in the Miocene, i.e. it began 20 million years ago and ended 7 million years ago. The only part of the volcano that is left is the neck or volcanic plug; the rest has been eroded. The alkali basalt has a silica (SiO_{2}) volume percentage of 45-55%. The main minerals in the rock are plagioclase, augite and olivine.

Peculiar to Scharfenstein, compared to other basalt outcrops in the area, are the very well-developed basalt columns, which are for the most part horizontal or slightly inclined. Basalt in columnar form is due to cooling, in which the long axis of the column is in the direction of the slowest cooling. It is likely that after eruption or intrusion, the basalt slumped back to produce the outcrop features at Scharfenstein.

The fresh broken edges of basalt are as sharp as a knife edge, which gives Scharfenstein (English: sharp stone) its name. Between the 21 and 22 March 1865, as the result of weathering, especially repeated freezing and cracking, the original outcrop broke apart and was reduced in height by a half.

== Cultural Heritage ==
In 1838, Franz von Dingelstedt published a collection of poems, one of which was entitled 'Althessiche Sage' (English: old hessian legend). It tells the romantic story of a band of Roman warriors, who, after being defeated in battle by the German barbarians, ask for sanctuary. They are then locked inside the hill and only come out in moonlight.

At Scharfenstein, at midnight hour,
Are mystic tones revealed,
Like tramp of war-steeds, and shield.
What clang of armour! Why, the doors
Assail tumultuously,
Till Scharfenstein moves circling round,
And caverns open fly?

— Franz von Dingelstedt The Mountain of Scharfenstein,
1st verse, translated by Mary Anne Burt, London, 1855.

Ludwig Emil Grimm (14 March 1790 –– 4 April 1863), the third brother of the more famous Brothers Grimm, Jacob and Wilhelm, painted Scharfenstein in watercolours (see figure right) in 1835, i.e., before it broke apart.

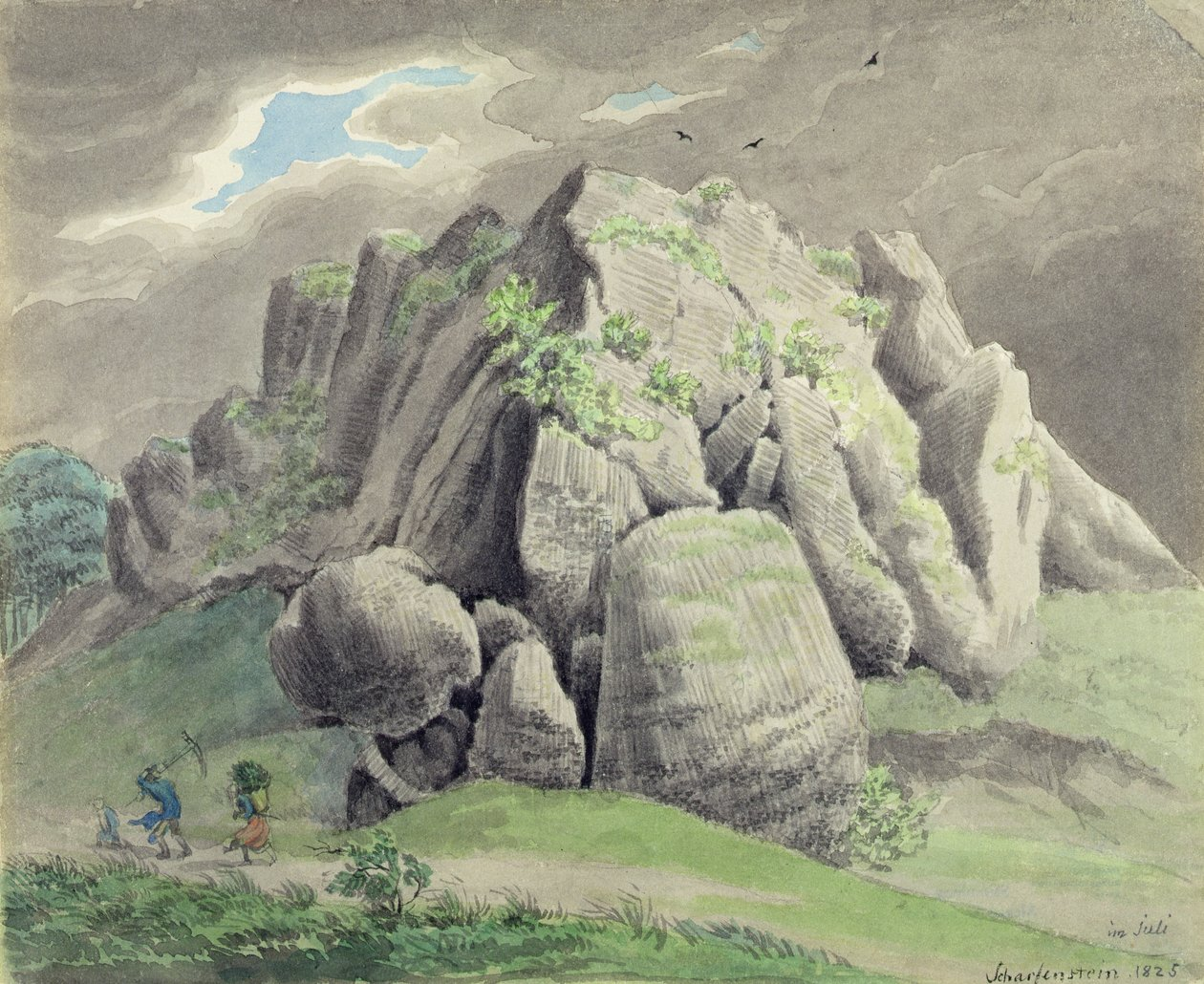
Watercolour of Scharfenstein

== Legend ==
It is said that a beautiful virgin keeps a treasure chest within the hill. On every seventh year she comes out and sneezes seven times. Whoever, at this time, calls out "Gott helf!" (English: lit - so help me God!, or bless you!) will receive the treasure and girl. Once a coach driver heard the sneezing, and called out six times "Gott helf!". But instead, on the seventh time, he cursed loudly and the girl disappeared. She was never seen again.

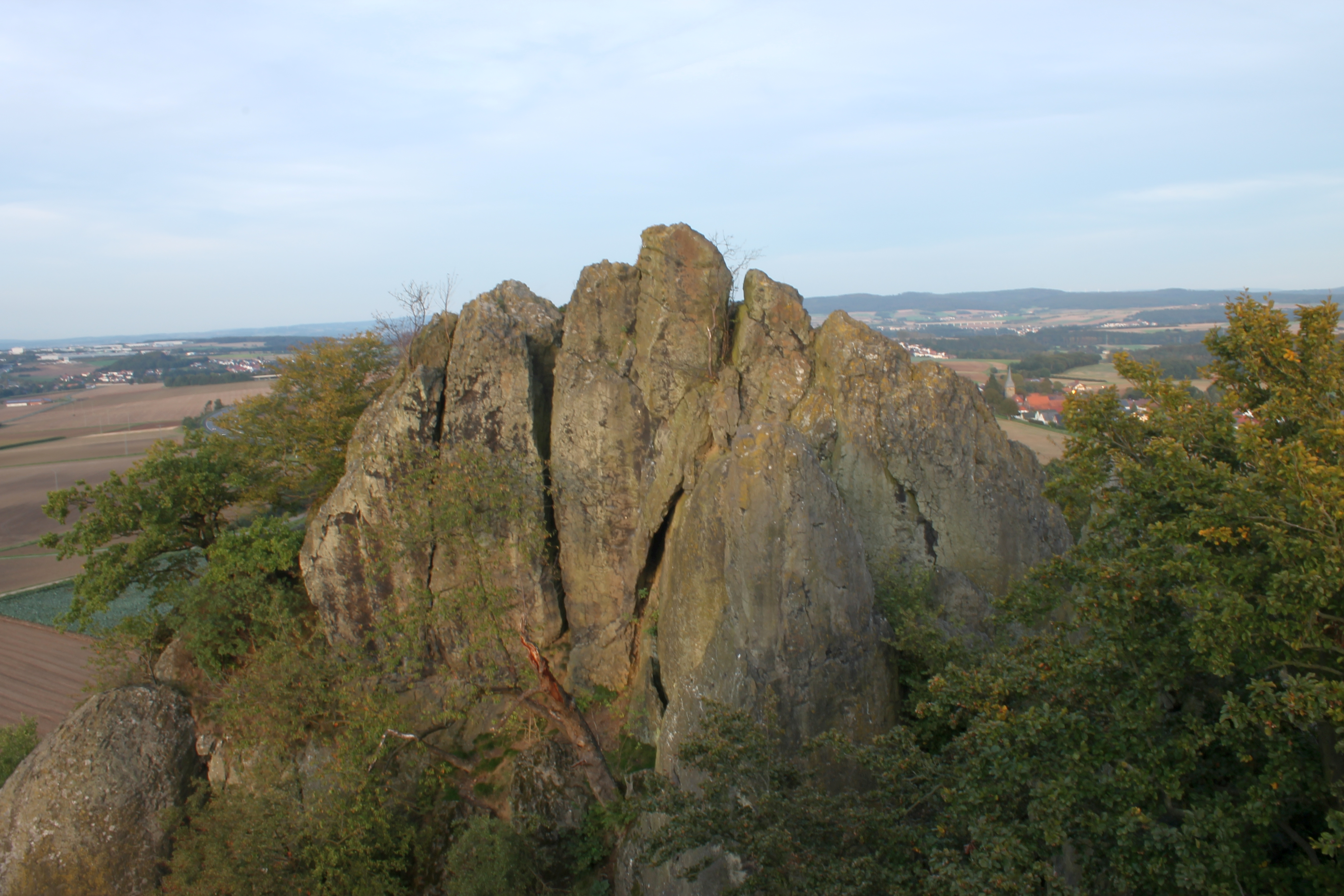
View from the southern summit of Scharfenstein of the northern half of the outcrop. In the middle the famous climbing route, Schiefe Anna.

== Outdoor Activities ==
Scharfenstein is a well-known target for climbers. There are over 85 climbing routes on the basalt hill.
