= Herbort of Fritzlar =

Herbort von Fritzlar was a cleric and writer. He wrote the German-language epic Song of Troy, comprising 18,458 verses in Middle High German, probably around 1190 to 1200.
