= History of Central European forests =

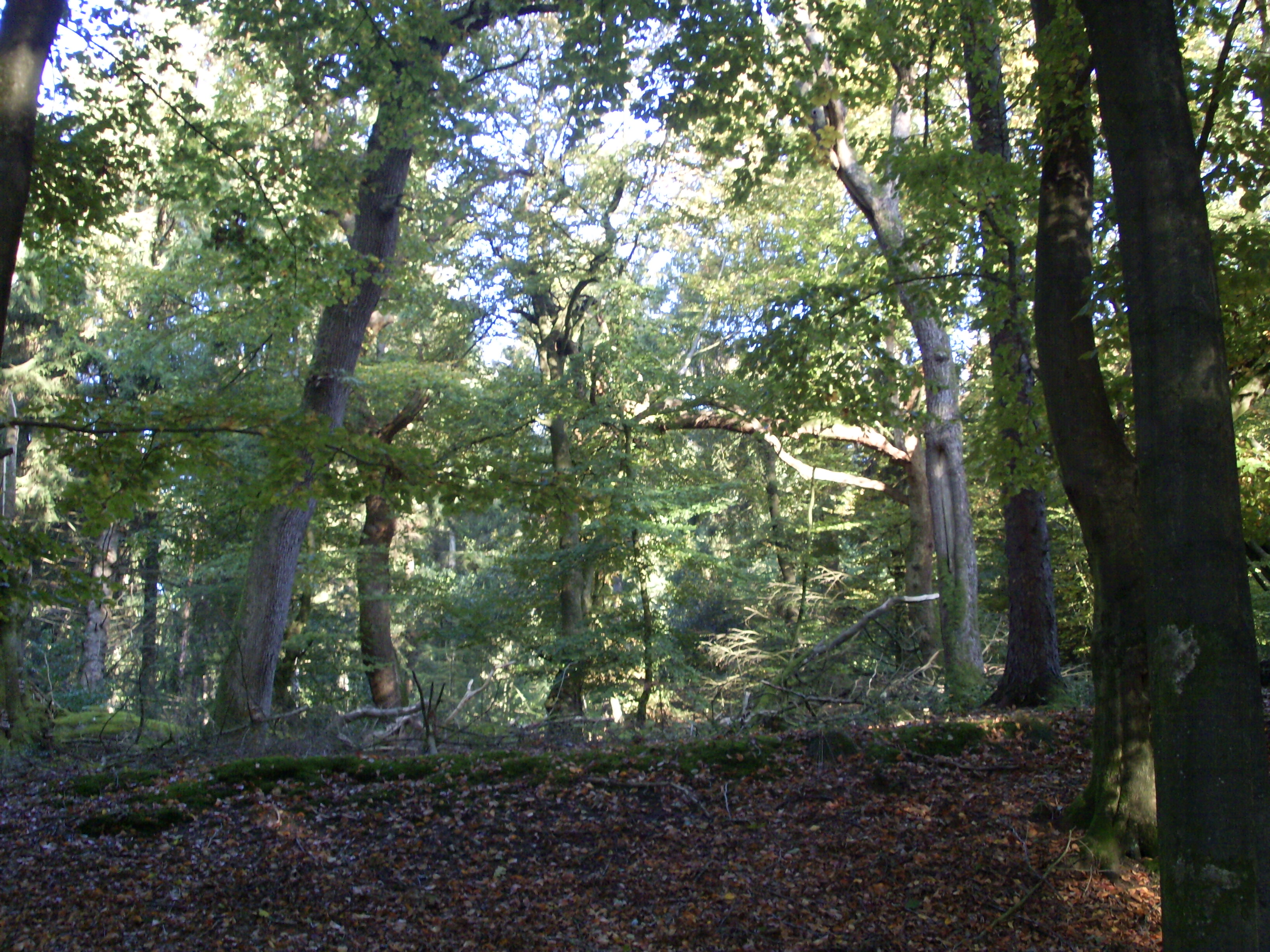
Handewitter Forest in Schleswig-Holstein, North Germany

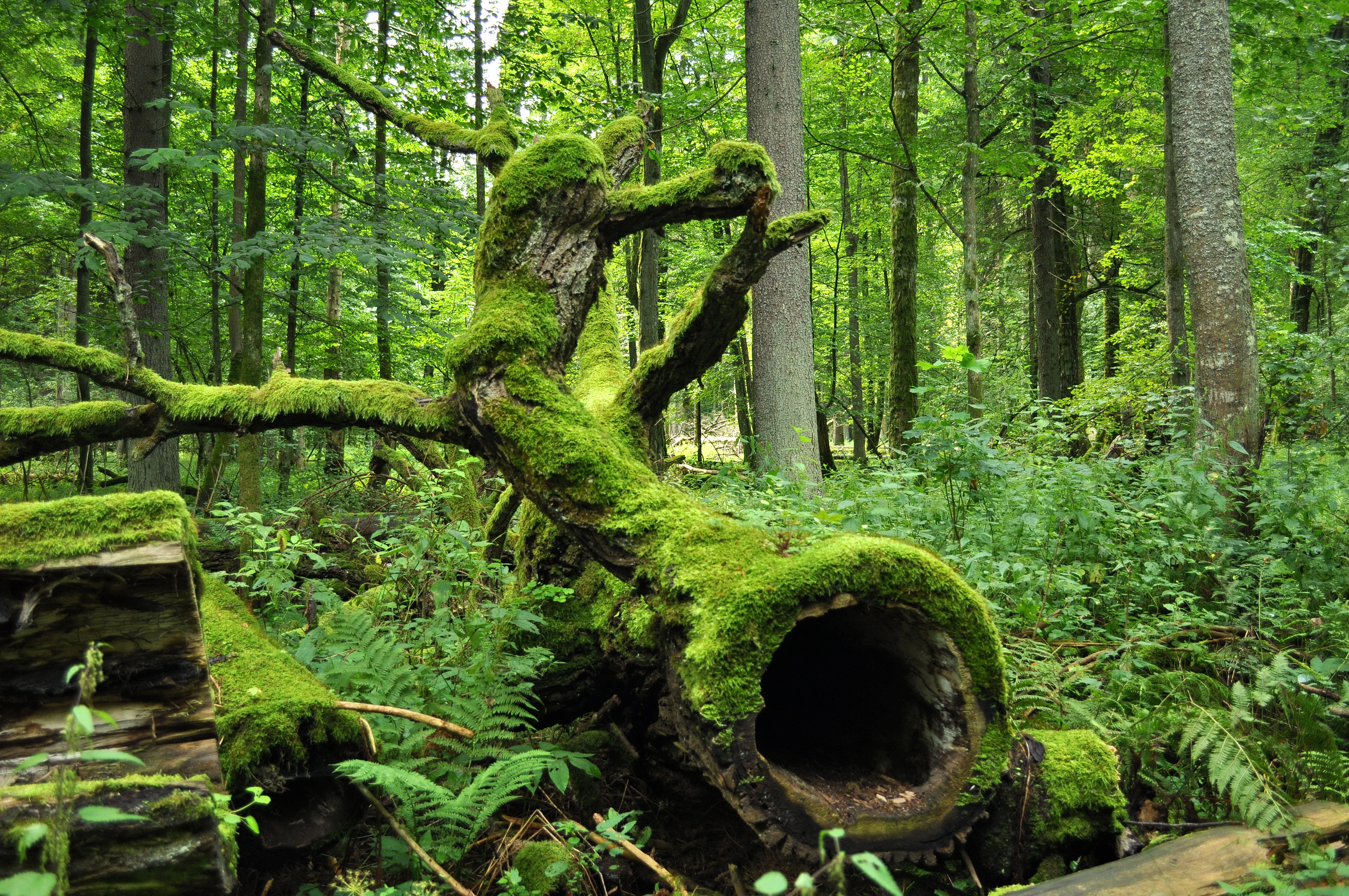
Białowieża Forest, Poland

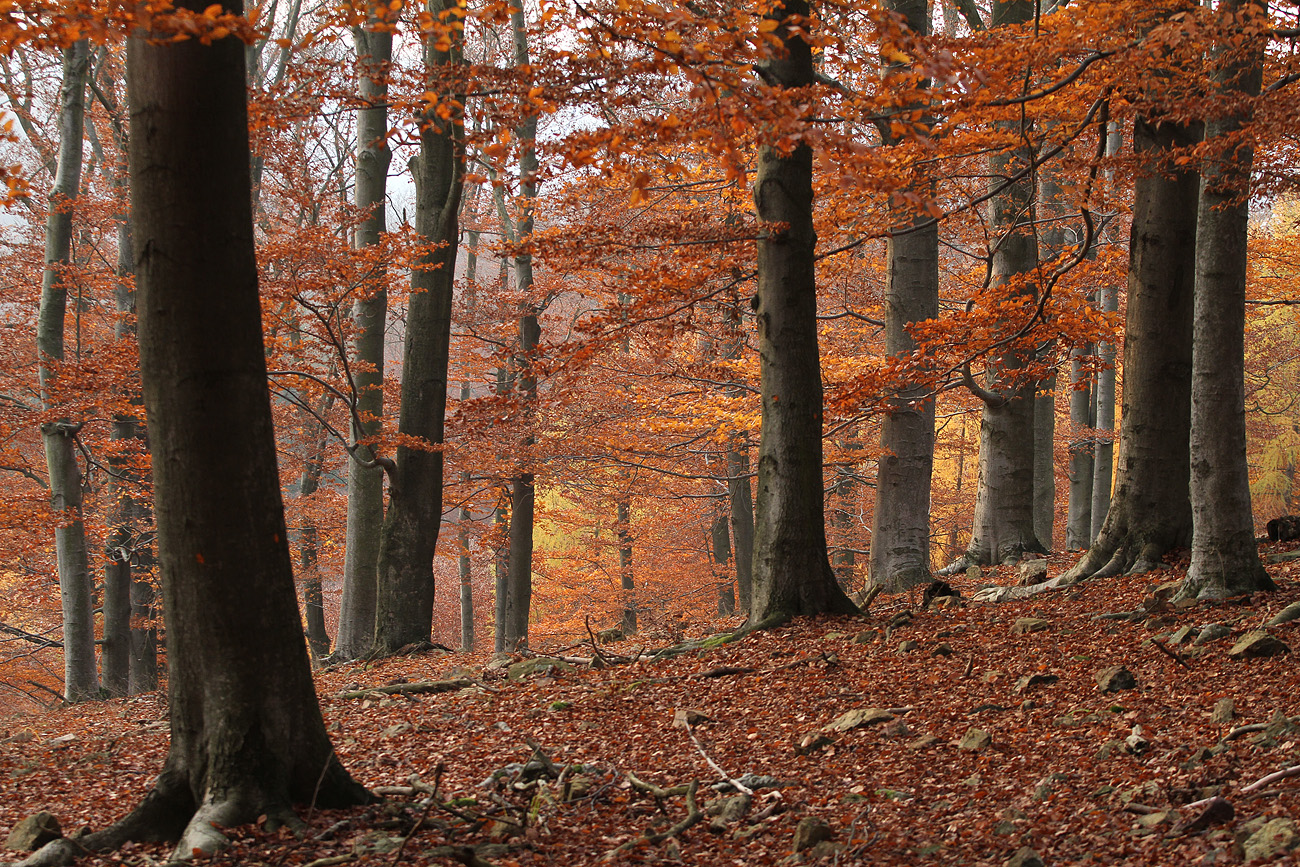
Křivoklátsko forest in central Bohemia, Czech Republic

The history of Central European forests is characterised by thousands of years of exploitation by people. Thus a distinction needs to be made between the botanical natural history of the forest in pre- and proto-historical times—which falls mainly into the fields of natural history and Paleobotany—and the onset of the period of sedentary settlement which began at the latest in the Neolithic era in Central Europe - and thus the use of the forest by people, which is covered by the disciplines of history, archaeology, cultural studies and ecology.

The definition of Central Europe is a (sometimes heated) area of debate, and isn't used with consistent meaning across fields of study, encyclopedias and dictionaries, cultures or natural and political borders.

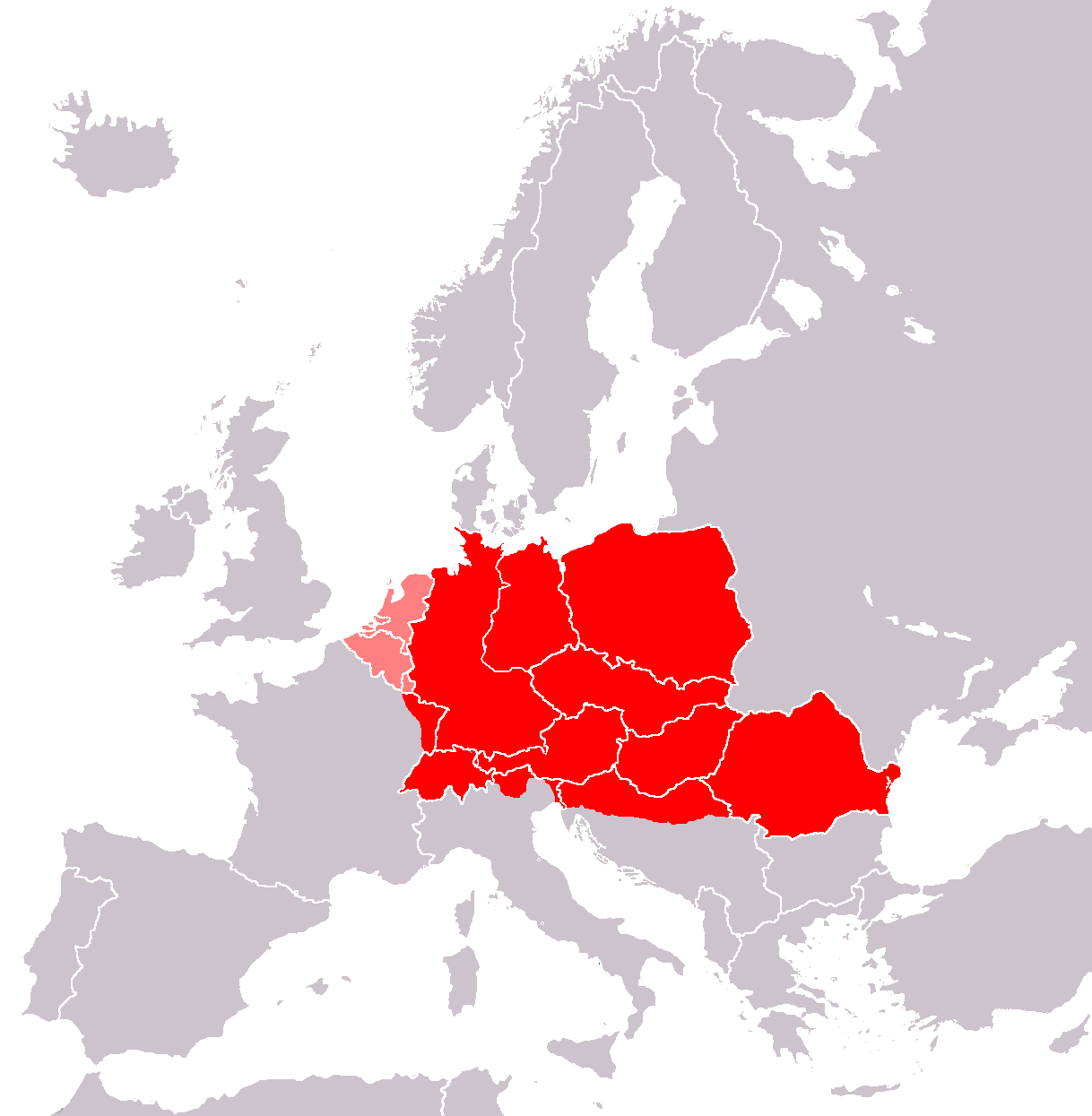
Most definitions of the term are a subset of this definition (Meyers Enzyklopaedisches Lexikon; 1980), but that's about where the agreement ends and different definitions within this grouping may not overlap at all.

In rough terms the general area both geographically and ecologically is situated between the North Sea, the Alps, the Baltic Sea and the Black Sea.

== Overview ==
Historical and contemporary human activity has profoundly influenced the composition of forests in the densely populated region of Central Europe. Remaining forest in Central Europe today is not generally considered natural forest, but rather a cultural landscape created over thousands of years which consists almost exclusively of replacement communities. The oldest evidence of human and forest interaction in Central Europe is the use of hand axes about 500 thousand years ago. The degree of hemeroby (human influence) and the extent of the original natural state from so long ago is difficult to estimate. It is believed that during glacial times during the ongoing ice age Central Europe was largely deforested and, in the period of "natural" re-emergence of the forest, since the end of the last glacial period, the Würm glaciation (about 11 700 years BP), people began to play a part transforming the potential natural vegetation. Sedentary, Neolithic farmers of the Linear Pottery Culture, about 7 500 years ago, began to change the forested landscape massively.

Due to feudal structures, the power over and ownership of forests was not at all clear for many centuries, which resulted in widespread overexploitation. As a result, during the period 1750-1850 forests in Central Europe had been decimated, causing a serious lack of timber. Some contemporary reports even spoke partly of desert-like landscapes at that time.

During the late 19th and 20th centuries a huge amount of artificial reforestation was implemented.

Today's forest communities in central Europe are influenced by the usefulness of the individual tree species. Apart from a few remnants of "near-natural forest" the vast majority of today's Central European forests are either artificial forests or whose present composition has arisen as a result of active or passive human intervention. By far the most common are commercial timber forests, which may be more or less near-natural, with beech and oak, spruce and pine. "Ancient forests" in Central Europe refer to the few remaining stands that are neither currently used for forestry nor were exploited in historical times.

Even with these, certain types of human influence, for example, forest browsing, cannot be completely ruled out. The composition and dynamics of the old Central European forests must therefore be reconstructed from these relics, from forest research areas and natural forest cells after they have ceased to be used, and by comparison with forest types in similar climatic conditions that are still true virgin forests, especially the Hyrcanian Forest on the Caspian Sea.

There is almost no data on the density and the influence of megaherbivores in prehistoric times, only conjecture. According to many forest scientists and a number of hunters, perpetual forest structures, which are advantageous for the forestry industry and the ecology, cannot be established without strong hunting measures to cull the present-day herbivores, the red and roe deer ensuring a correspondingly low density of these herbivores. Excessive stocks of deer do not only harm the forest as a commodity, but also prevent the natural regeneration of the forest through selective browsing by the animals and therefore hinder its natural development.

The megaherbivore theory argues that larger densities of game should therefore be permitted, because it would create a half-open and diverse landscape. Apart from red and roe deer there are no large herds of herbivores today and they have few natural predators. In today's cultural landscape, the establishment of permanent forest is seen as an economic and ecological goal; herbivores roving over wide areas inflict economic damage and are therefore hunted. The grazing of wild megaherbivores is therefore limited, as a landscape conservation measure, to large nature reserves in which a species-rich and semi-open landscape is to be preserved and economic objectives are rated as less important.

=== Forms of forest use ===
- Silviculture and forest management dominate forestry in Central Europe today.
- Hunting is probably the earliest form of forest use. Among the most important species hunted are roe deer, various species of red deer, wild boar, red fox and some smaller mammals. In the past large carnivores - the lynx, brown bear and wolf - also belonged to this group; but today, these species have very small populations in German-speaking countries and restricted to very small areas within the region, so these animals are currently protected. Forests were kept partly as game reserves, as so called "wildbann" forests (Wildbannforste), reserved for grand hunts by the nobility, and are probably better preserved in a relatively original state as a result.
- Silvopasture is an early historical, agroforestry form of forest use, whereby cattle were driven into the forest for pasture. Depending on how intensively this was done, the forest was either thinned or died out. Woody plants that are not readily eaten, such as juniper, spread. As a result, in many places, clear, park-like countryside and juniper heaths were created in the Middle Ages and modern era. These communities later reduced as areas were reforested or as agricultural use intensified.
- Recreation activities in the forests of Central Europe increased during the 20th century as a result of the leisure society. The social function of European forests is increasingly seen as important, and competes with its classic uses.
- Protection forests (Schutzwald) are those where the economic exploitation takes a low priority. The protection they offer may refer to location (e.g. unstable soils), to objects (avalanche protection of settlements), to habitat conservation and other ecologically significant factors, or the forest as a social space. The use of forest to provide a protective function is today the third major component alongside economic forestry for wood products and hunting.

== Historical Overview ==
- Effect of the ice ages
- Effects of Neolithization
- Roman-Germanic settlement period
  - Forests in free Germania
  - Forests in Roman occupied Germania
  - Forests during the period of mass migration
- Forest development in the Middle Ages - pre-industrial uses, destruction, first regulated uses
  - Royal privileges over forest use legislated through wildbanns
  - Common use of the forests by adjacent settlements such as those around the Markwald
  - Nuremberg Imperial Forest (Reichswald) (as early as the Middle Ages, regulated pine industry in the late 15th century?), earlier regulated selection cutting in southwestern Germany and especially in Switzerland?
  - Effects of preindustrial forest uses (saltworks, charcoal burning, naval construction, ...)
  - Historical agricultural forms of use (leaf and pine needle gathering for animal straw, wood pasture - continued long after the Middle Ages, though in terms of area no longer relevant by the 20th century)
- Forest development from the end of the Thirty Years' War to the present
  - Little Ice Age, 15th to 19th centuries, a period of cold weather affecting wood growth and consumption, which in the early 19th century contributed to a large shortage of timber
  - Thirty Years' War - recovery of population decline
  - Effects of preindustrial forest uses (mining, smelting, saltworks, charcoal burning, dairy farming (Holländerei) (exploitation, timber rafts from the Black Forest, some to London), naval construction (in the Battle of Trafalgar huge oak forests were lost), ...)
  - Wood shortage (Holznot)
  - Development of forestry from 1700:
  - Industrialization: substitution of charcoal by lignite, coal, crude oil
  - Discovery of fertilizers
  - Forest dieback or Waldsterben

== Effects of ice ages ==
Unusual climatic extremes began to occur during the Pliocene epoch, four million years ago. In the Pleistocene epoch that followed, these fluctuations culminated in a number of extensive ice ages, which ended, in central Europe, around 12,000 years ago. (For details, see the last glacial period and climate history.)

During these cold periods, the average temperature in Central Europe fell by up to 12 °C. The snowline in the Alps dropped by 1,200 metres to 1,400 metres. Between the Alpine glaciers and the Scandinavian ice sheet, with a thickness of up to 3,000 m, was a relatively narrow, ice-free belt.

Central Europe was unforested at this time, except for local wooded areas of steppe and tundra which were covered by frost-resistant birch and pine. The vegetation of this period is referred to as Dryas flora, after its flagship species, the mountain avens (Dryas octopetala).

=== Extinctions ===
Unlike, for example, the North American continent where mountain ranges are oriented in a north–south direction, the east–west running ranges in Europe blocked the retreat of forest species in the face of advancing ice sheets. This barrier led to the extinction of several species in Europe. In the early ice ages, horse chestnut (Aesculum hippocastanum) and sweet gum (Liquidambar) became extinct. The following cold period led to the extinction of sequoia (Sequoia), umbrella pine (Sciadopitys, Cryptomeria ), arborvitaes (Thuja), tulip trees (Liriodendron) and Douglas fir (Pseudotsuga). Hemlock (Tsuga) and hickory (Carya) became extinct during the Quaternary glaciations in Central Europe.

In addition, of the numerous oak species only three were able to return to Germany and Central Europe from their refuge areas, namely the English oak (Quercus robur), sessile oak (Q. petraea) and downy oak (Q. pubescens). By comparison, in North America there are over 80 species of oak. Other types lost considerably in their intraspecific genetic diversity during the return migration such as the white fir (Abies alba).

=== Refuges ===
Forest flora was pushed back slowly by climatic change. The refuges of the last ice age were probably but not exclusively in southern Europe. A few species on today's Atlantic coast between England and France could also have survived the cold spell of the forest steppes. Another area of retreat was east and southeast Europe. Unlike much of Scandinavia and Russia, the Carpathians remained ice-free. So some species were also able to survive here. But the classic refuge remained the Mediterranean region, where the sea made for a balanced climate and highly rugged mountain ranges partitioned different residual populations.

=== Return migration ===
In the interglacials those species that had survived extinction gradually repopulated the region. These return migrations took place at different rates for different tree species. The determining factors for the speed with which tree species repopulated the clear areas, were e. g. the method of seed distribution, the duration of flowering, degree of frost resistance and their ability to absorb nutrients. The picture of these migrations can be reconstructed using pollen analysis.

First to advance were woody pioneer species that were quick to spread, such as birch and pine. They were followed by heat-loving species such as oak and elm. Finally they were followed by slower migrating woody species that evolved into a climax community (see cyclic succession). With the end of the interglacial period and the onset of cooler climates, these species then retreated to their refuges again or simply died out.

== Most recent post-glacial period ==
In the most recent section of the Quaternary period, the Holocene or postglacial epoch, the forests began to return, about 11 700 years ago, to the treeless, post-glacial steppes. Pollen analysis has largely clarified how this return migration happened. For Central Europe, there were ten phases as a rule (according to Franz Firbas), which are called pollen zones and given Roman numerals as part of the Blytt–Sernander sequence.

More recent works are increasingly often using their own pollen zone systems in order to better reflect local circumstances. The process of reforestation is fairly broadly consistent, but there are some regional differences due to local circumstances which are not discussed here in detail. Due to the migration rate (which for beech was about 260 metres/year) there is a temporal delay in the various phases from south to north.

=== Late Arctic period, Allerød and Younger Dryas ===
This covers pollen zones I-III (approx 12,400 to the 9,500 BC) and roughly corresponds to the period of the late Paleolithic. Pioneer species in the early postglacial (Holocene) included various species of willow (Salix), but birch (Betula) and pine (Pinus) also gained a foothold again in Central Europe. Short-term fluctuations in temperature at the end of this phase stopped any further advancement of the forest.

=== Pre-interglacial (Preboreal) and early interglacial (Boreal) ===
In the Preboreal stage, corresponding to the beginning of the Mesolithic, birch and pine were the dominant species. From this time there were no more cold periods. Hazel (Corylus) spread rapidly and found favourable growing conditions beneath the open stands of pine.

=== Middle interglacial (Atlantic) ===
At the end of the Middle Stone Age, average temperatures rose markedly. Phytosociologically this was the start of the Atlantic period. Previous tree species were displaced, especially by oak (Quercus) and elm (Ulmus). Most of these species were demanding, particularly in terms of their need for nutrients and warmth. The less shade-tolerant pine, in particular, was forced onto poorer sandy sites and moors. The oak, accompanied by the elm and lime, now formed the most predominant stands in Central Europe, the mixed oak forest.

In this time, people went through the transition from a nomadic wandering people to the sedentary lifestyle of the Neolithic. The great houses of the Linear Pottery culture already placed a high demand for wood on local forests which were still small and a few in number. No later than the Neolithic, the forest was being deliberately managed to produce logs.

During the Neolithic period more heat-loving deciduous shrubs spread out from their refuges in southern Europe back to Central Europe. Maple (Acer) and ash (Fraxinus) enriched existing stocks. The average temperatures were now 2-3 °C higher than today. The downy oak (Quercus pubescens) returned to Germany again. Alder (Alnus glutinosa) carrs arose in the marshy lowlands and spruce (Picea abies) reached the Harz Mountains.

=== Late interglacial (Subboreal) ===
In the late interglacial the climated became cooler and wetter. For the first time since the last ice age beech (Fagus sylvatica), hornbeam (Carpinus betulus) and silver fir (Abies alba) are evident again.

During the Bronze Age the average temperature fell further. Beech trees advanced into the hitherto oak-dominated woods. During the Iron Age, from 1000 B. C. beech trees were threatening the oak population in almost all areas. Aided by the humid, maritime climate of Central Europe and an ability, even in old age, to add to its habitat, the beech (with its high crown plasticity) became the dominant tree species. On the drier sites (precipitation < 500 mm/yr) in the east the hornbeam assumed this role.

In the Central Uplands a mixed mountain forest developed as beech invaded it. The extremely shade-tolerant fir also succeeded in gaining a foothold in these forests and in several areas ousted the spruce and beech. It is possible that at this time the establishment of potential natural vegetation came to an end however as human settlement spread across Central Europe and large herds of herbivores were roaming around.

=== Post interglacial period (Sub-Atlantic) ===
As a result of falling average temperatures the distribution areas, e.g. of the downy oak, became divided. From now on the influence of settled human forms of settlement becomes increasingly noticeable. This gives us our modern life zones which is controlled by altitudinal zonation.

== Iron Age to Roman-Germanic period ==
The first intensive use of forests began in the Celtic period with the expansion of agriculture and the smelting of metals. This increased during the Roman-Germanic period especially in the densely populated southwestern areas.

== Forests in Germania ==
=== Free Germania ===
Publius Cornelius Tacitus described "Free Germania" (Germania magna) in the 1st century as "terra aut silvis horrida aut paludibus foeda" – a land, covered by horrid forests or loathsome bogs. Tacitus' Mediterranean homeland at that time had already been a cultural landscape for centuries, its forests cleared for fields, orchards and towns, to say nothing of the use of wood for home fires and maritime construction.

A land whose forests probably covered 70% of its surface, and which was climatically very different, clearly impressed Roman observers. This impression can be seen in the names they gave it. Mountain ranges like the Black Forest were called Silva Abnoba, not Mons Abnoba. It may thus be deduced that at that time trackless low mountain ranges were still largely spared from human influence. But even on the plains there were still great, contiguous areas of forest. These were located especially between the settlement areas of the various Germanic tribes and were respected on both sides as a boundary.

Settlement areas included riparian forests and woods on rich soils. Initial incursions were made in order to build the settlements themselves. Next woods were cleared for farming and grazing. Timber felling for heating led to the further thinning of natural stands of trees around the settlements. Various forms of use, such as wood pasture, favoured mast-bearing trees like oaks (Quercus) and beech (Fagus). In the vicinity of ore mining beech trees were probably felled over a wide area because fire from beech charcoal was needed to work metals.

Permanent towns and villages were, however, a rarity in Free Germania. Settlements would be abandoned after a period of time and biological succession set in. This enabled a return of vegetation to something resembling its natural state.

=== Roman-occupied Germania ===
The forest in Roman-occupied Germania (the Roman provinces of Germania Superior and Inferior) was more intensively used than in the unoccupied area. The construction of towns, such as Mainz, Trier, Cologne and Xanten, needed appropriate quantities of timber. A continual supply of large stocks of timber was needed for household heating and the operation of Roman baths with their extensive under-floor heating and hot water basins.

After the conquest of all Germania had failed (due to the defeat of Varus in 9 AD) the Romans switched to a defensive strategy. This, too, demanded large quantities of timber. The construction of the limes, over 500 kilometres long, which was predominantly a wooden rather than a stone redoubt, required a wide swathe to be cut through the forest from the Rhine to the Danube and wood was needed for construction of palisades and watchtowers.

The Roman engineers were careful, as far as possible, to follow the shape of the terrain with the limes and to inclose fertile soils. For example, the fertile Wetterau, opposite the Mainz was within the limes; the poor, pine-covered keuper soils south of the Odenwald were left beyond it however. Much of the beech and oak stock on nutrient-rich soil had to give way to agricultural fields and pasture land. At several places grassy and dwarf shrub heathlands emerged that have survived to the present day. The Romans also kept away from the plains with their unpredictable rivers. The alder (Alnus glutinosa) carrs away from the rivers, however, were turned into grazing land.

In selecting sites for their settlements, the Romans also avoided dense coniferous forests, although mixed forest areas may still have been attractive. They prized softwood, however, especially that of silver fir (Abies alba), for construction and shipbuilding. Pine was felled in all accessible locations and transported over long distances (by rafting). Thus, the natural mountain forest in parts of the Alps, the Black Forest and the Vosges was divided.

The Romans brought familiar species of tree with them to Germania from the Mediterranean region; these included sweet chestnut (Castanea sativa), horse chestnut (Aesculus hippocastanum) and walnut (Juglans regia). These species had died out in North Europe during the ice age. The trees were valued for their fruit. In addition, the robust timber of sweet chestnuts was used in wine growing.

== Völkerwanderung - the Migration Period ==
The Romans gradually gave way to growing pressure from the Germanic tribes. First, settlements on the right bank of the Rhine were abandoned after the defeat of Varus. And from the 2nd century several tribes broke through the border (the Marcomanni and Lombards). In the 4th and 5th centuries, the Germanic peoples finally overwhelmed the last remnants of the Limes. Pollen analyses from this period show that agriculture came to a standstill in many areas. Abandoned Roman castella and manors became forest land.

Settlement patterns in the formerly occupied Germania changed. Permanent settlements were abandoned in favor of semi-sedentary settlement forms. If the forest and soil became exhausted around a settlement, its population moved on. As the population density decreased a succession of forest communities began again in many areas, which had been strongly influenced by the economies of the Roman settlers. The pollen analyses from this period show that the beech (Fagus sylvatica) spread out widely again, both in the areas deserted by the Romans, and along the Pomeranian Baltic coast and to southern Sweden.

Roman colonization saw the first, drastic impact on the forest communities of Central Europe. It left forest-free areas that did not recover from grazing; the species structure in many forest communities was disrupted by selective use, and introduced species became part of the vegetation.

== Middle Ages ==
=== Völkerwanderung and the Middle Ages ===
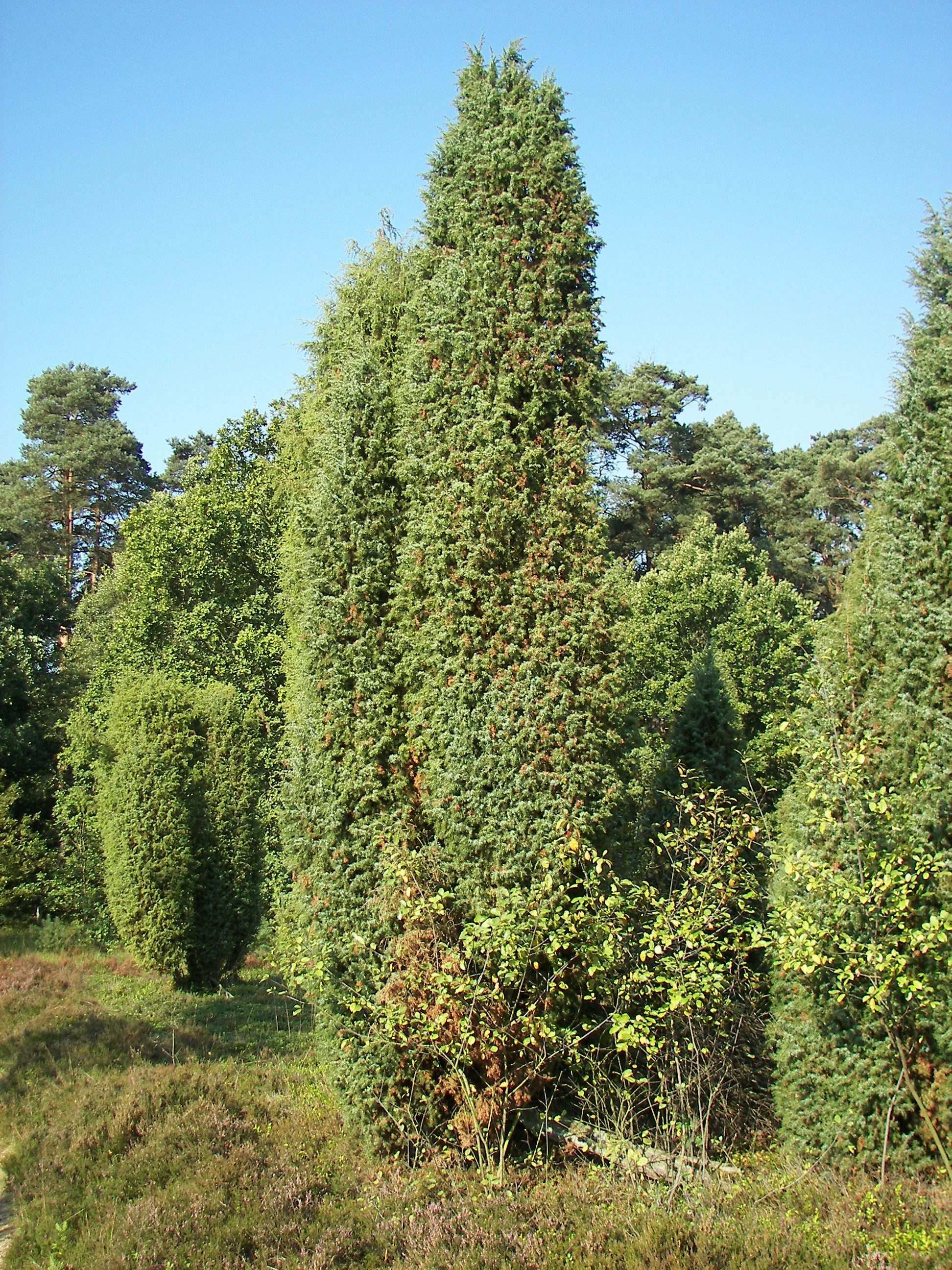
A juniper on the Lüneburg Heath.

The expansion of the forests as villages were abandoned during the Völkerwanderung was followed by a period of forest clearance in the Early and High Middle Ages. Deforestation to create arable land and provide construction timber and firewood was largely uncontrolled. These periods have affected the landscapes of Central Europe right up to the present and created our familiar cultural landscapes.

The so-called Little Ice Age, with its particularly cold periods from 1570 to 1630 and 1675 to 1715, which was associated with catastrophic crop failures and disease, led to the desettlement of large areas of land into which secondary forest spread. The destruction during and in the aftermath of the Thirty Years' War also led to the strong afforestation of formerly agricultural lands, in many parts of Germany the population only recovered to its 1600 level by 1800 or later.

=== Forest development in the Middle Ages ===
==== Proportion of forested land ====
With the turmoil of the Migration Period, the forest spread into Central Europe again. In areas cultivated during Roman colonization, the forest often regained a foothold. Only at the end of the Migration Period did the area of settlement increase again, and permanent settlements soon developed especially on agronomically suitable soils.

Two intensive periods of forest clearing can be distinguished. The first lasted from about 500 to about 800 and the second from about 1100 to about 1300, the beginning of the crisis of the 14th century. Especially during the first clearance period, the Carolingian era, those areas that had already been developed by the Romans were resettled. Next, areas that were easily accessible and had fertile soils were colonized.

The high Central Upland ranges remained empty at this early stage. The first permanent settlements in the Black Forest for example only appear from about 1000, and the Harz was only traversable by difficult footpaths. Riparian forests near rivers (such as B. am Rhein) remained unsettled due to the unpredictability of the river. Water meadow woods further from the river were used. After 800, the pace of settlement and deforestation faltered in Central Europe. The population did not increase significantly due to epidemics and the invasion of foreign peoples (Normans in the north and Magyars in the south).

=== Forest use in the Middle Ages ===
==== Wood pasture ====
As well as swine, large livestock (cattle and horses) were also driven into the forest creating areas of wood pasture, which had clearly negative consequences for forest tree communities. Unlike pigs, which preserved the character of the forest, large domestic animals destroyed the trees. "Overgrazed" forests quickly turned into scrub.

Particularly disastrous was the woodland grazing of sheep and goats. The latter in particular are able to destroy older trees thanks to their climbing skills. The grazing of goats in the forest was therefore forbidden in early forest regulations. But the prohibition was often ignored because sheep and goats, as domestic animals of the poorer sections of the population, contributed significantly to their survival.

==== Honey pasture ====
Beekeeping in the Middle Ages was a major forest activity because honey was still the only sweetener for food until the 19th century. As a result, the rights for beekeeping were managed at a high level. This form of activity is mentioned, for example, in connexion with the Nuremberg Imperial Forest. The existence of honey hunting operations helped to protect the forest. Tree species such as lime, pussy willow, fir and also pine were particularly favoured by this type of work.

==== Forest tillage ====
Forest tillage (Waldfeldbau) was practised from the 11th century and varied according to the region. This form of agriculture was established after the better soils had already been exploited for farming. This type of agricultural "intermediate use" (Zwischennutzung) had numerous variants, something that is reflected in the names they were given: Hackwald, Hauberge, Reutberge, Birkenberge and Schiffelland are the most common designations.

The importance of these forms of economy increased during the pre-industrial period. They were constantly improved and formed an elaborate system of secondary forest uses (Lohrinde), firewood and farming. For this, the trees were first cleared by fire or felling. After the soil had been worked with mattocks or ploughs, it was sown with rye, buckwheat or wheat.

Usually the soil yielded crops for no longer than a year. It was then turned into grazing land until trees grew up again from the stumps or from seed. This form of agriculture had a considerable impact on the composition of forest trees.

==== Resin collecting ====
Resin collecting is one of the oldest forms of forest exploitation. The resin was collected from conifers, of which spruce and pine were preferred. Even this form of forest use caused considerable destruction. It hindered growth and weakened the vitality of entire stands of trees. As a result, early on resin collecting was restricted to stands that were not easily felled and transported i.e. those that were a long way from rivers. Because resin was a popular base material, such bans were ignored everywhere.

==== Firewood ====
Even today, wood is still an important source of energy for mankind. In Central Europe it was replaced by coal during the course of the 19th century. In the Middle Ages there were two quite different uses for firewood from the forests - local and non-local. Locally there was only one requirement that had an unrestricted priority: the use of firewood for home fires. In addition, a range of industry processes required firewood as an energy source or as a raw material, for example: charcoal burning, glassmaking, salt production and mining with its associated hammer mills.

==== Charcoal burning ====
Charcoal burning was carried out in all woods and forests. In woods that were closer to settlements greater care was taken to avoid forest fires and to use only lower value wood. In woods that were more distant from human habitation there were no such restrictions. Charcoal burning generally took place near small rivers and streams that were used to transport the charcoal. In the Middle Ages earthen kilns (Erdmeiler) were exclusively used to produce charcoal.

==== Glassworks ====
Glass was highly prized during the Middle Ages and was correspondingly valuable. Forest glassworks often had small settlements tied to them, where the families of the glassblowers lived. Glassworks needed a particularly large supply of wood and were often described in contemporary reports as "wood-eating businesses". Glassworks also needed charcoal burners and ash burners, who supplied important fuel for the manufacture of glass. 90% of the wood was used to make potash, the most important raw material for glassmaking; the remaining 10% for the actual glass smelting.

==== Saltworks ====
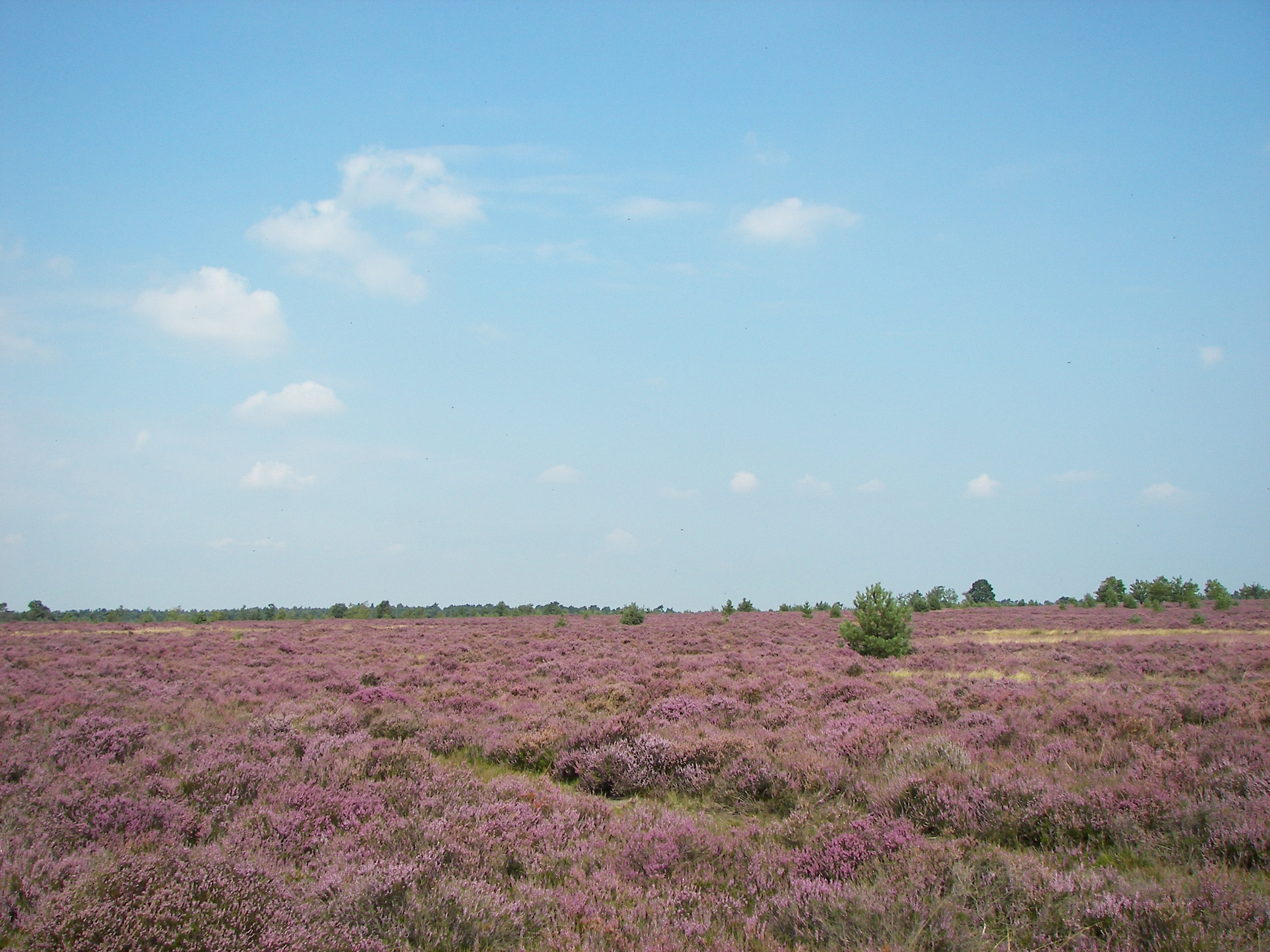
Lüneburg Heath is the site of former salt extraction and was previously a forested area.

In the Late Middle Ages the majority of salt deposits were transferred into the ownership of the territorial princes. That started an unrestrained extraction of this important economic commodity. Large quantities of wood were needed for the process of salt mining, both for the construction of galleries as well as for the boiling pans (Sudpfannen) of the saltworks or salines. These took the largest proportion of wood.

How disastrous the extraction of salt was for some landscapes is illustrated by the example of the town of Lüneburg in North Germany. Before salt was discovered it was surrounded by dense forests, but during the course of salt mining all the woods were cleared. Only a heath landscape remained, a countryside that was further devastated by plaggen agriculture. During the 20th century much of the area to the southwest of Lüneburg became a British military training area, causing further destruction.

==== Mines ====
Mining required three natural conditions: first, the presence of ores; second, large forests, needed for pit props and the wood for producing charcoal; and third, water power in the shape of rivers and streams. Smelting was carried out in the vicinity of the shaft. In the Harz, mining is mentioned as early as the 10th century. Because mining needed such large quantities of wood, its regulation was an early consideration and, by the end of the Middle Ages the first taxes were imposed on forests for their use in the mining industry. Forests in mining regions enjoyed a special status and, early on, their primary use for mining purposes was firmly established.

==== Timber and rafting ====
Building and construction timber was exported to various parts of Europe from an early date. Popular types of wood, such as oak and conifers are recorded as being rafted down rivers to the Baltic Sea from the 13th century. Yew was especially prized because of its outstanding properties, especially its flexural strength, which was popular in the manufacture of weapons. In order to make bows, such as the English longbow, entire stands of yew were cleared in Austria. This species of tree was hated by carters because their draught animals died from eating its poisonous fruit.

=== Summary ===
The consequences of medieval forest use may be summed up as follows: many cohesive forest areas were largely destroyed, due mainly to the felling of trees for firewood. Even the most remote forest areas were affected. What remained was a landscape whose devastation is still recognizable, for example, the treeless hill ridges, the moorland and the present distribution of tree species in the central European forests.

The dwindling forests that did not regenerate themselves led to erosion of the soils, including those suitable for agricultural, in the wake of which, fields and settlements had to be abandoned. The result was a shortage of supply, especially in time of war. Given the devastating effects of overexploitation arising for the reasons set out above, territorial lords imposed official regulations for the use of woodland, a case in point being the 1579 Hohenlohe Forest regulations.

== Holznot ==
"Holznot", an imminent or existing acute lack of wood as a raw material, has been a social problem since the 16th century. Due to the realization that coniferous forests naturally regenerate only with difficulty, the planting of conifer seeds was successfully attempted in the Middle Ages.

Large quantities of wood were needed as a source of energy in private households and in early industrial production, for example, in glassmaking, tanning, the production of soot and in mining (in pit construction to support tunnels against collapse).

In the Black Forest huge quantities of timber were tied together to form rafts and exported to the Netherlands, where the wood was needed for shipbuilding. Farmers have overexploited forests for centuries through grazing and to make straw. At the end of the 18th century, there were hardly any forests left in Germany (see Deforestation). Wood eventually became so scarce that, in winter, fence posts, steps and all kinds of wooden objects, that were expendable in the short term, were burned as firewood.

== Today ==
In places like Germany today, hunters pay fees to the landowner in whose forest they hunt. These fees are covered inter alia by the use or sale of meat or fur from the animals killed. The hunting of deer is particularly necessary in Central Europe, due to the absence of large carnivores. Without human intervention, certain plant species would be destroyed by selective feeding, which is already seriously endangering some species. For the same reason the goal of ecological forest management, which is moving away from monocultures towards stable mixed forests, has been threatened by high levels of deer. Often spruce which, compared to other tree species is less robust, experiences problems trying to rejuvenate itself on most sites where it grows today after having been artificially planted.

=== Typical types of European commercial forest ===
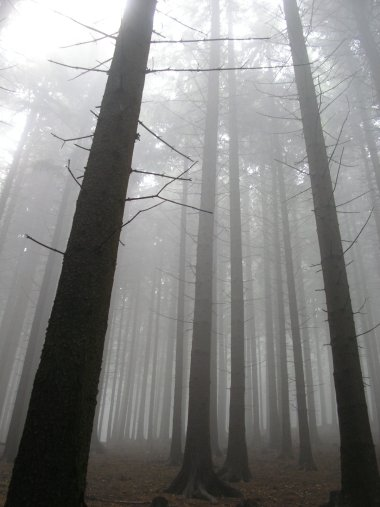
An even-aged forest in the mist.

Commercial forests today can be divided into various types, although due to the modern forestry industry, most people today only have mature forests in mind:

- High forest from "core growth" (Kernwachs) with a single, high tree storey.
  - Even-aged forest
  - Uneven-aged forest called plenterwald
- Low or coppiced forest or woodland from coppicing
  - Like the Hauwald (felled wood), a former type of forest use. Deciduous trees were cut to the stump - i.e. 30 to 50 centimetres above the ground - every 15 to 30 years. The wood was used mostly as firewood or in charcoal production. These deciduous trees (lime and hazel) regrew from the stump and could be cut down again after 15 or more years. As a result of new stems sprouting from the stump the trees grew bushy with numerous shoots on each stump. An example of a Hauwald can still be seen, for example, in Lindholz in the Havelland Luch.
  - See also Hauberg.
- Mittelwald, a forest with two tree storeys, is a transitional form between high and low forest
- Pasture woodland (Hutewald or Hudewald), or grazing forest, is an ancient form of use, as well as forest farmland (Waldäcker) or forest fields, as a combined agricultural and forestry form of land use
- Next, there are a variety of obsolete special uses, such as Lohwald, which were only local or regional.

=== Development of forest ownership ===
- Common land (Allmende)
- Wildbannforst
- Markwald
- Territorial lordship (Landesherrlichkeit)
- Secularisation
- Private forest (Privatwald)
  - Hauberg
  - Waldinteressentenschaft
- Forest community (Waldgenossenschaft e.g. Haingeraide)
- Communal forest (Kommunalwald)
- Church forest (Kirchenwald)
- State forest (Landeswald)
- Federal forest (Bundeswald)

== See also ==
- Forest in Germany
- German Forest
- Mitteleuropa
- Cyclic succession
- Slash-and-burn, especially the history section.
- Royal forests, about forest development in England in the Middle Ages
- Wood-pasture hypothesis

== Literature ==
- Bernd-Stefan Grewe: Wald, European History Online, publ. by the Leibniz Institute of European History, Mainz, 2011, retrieved 18 May 2011.
- K. Jan Oosthoek, Richard Hölzl (eds.), Managing Northern Europe's Forests. Histories from the Age of Improvement to the Age of Ecology, Berghahn, Oxford/New York, 2018, ISBN 978-1-78533-600-3.
- Richard Hölzl, Historicizing Sustainability. German scientific forestry in the 18th and 19th centuries", Science as Culture 19/4, 2010, pp. 431–460
- Karl Hasel / Ekkehard Schwartz: Forstgeschichte. Ein Grundriss für Studium und Praxis, Kessel, Remagen, ²2002, ISBN 3-935638-26-4.
- Richard B. Hilf: Der Wald. Wald und Weidwerk in Geschichte und Gegenwart – Erster Teil [Reprint of the original 1938 edition]. Aula, Wiebelsheim, 2003, ISBN 3-494-01331-4
- Hansjörg Küster: Geschichte des Waldes. Von der Urzeit bis zur Gegenwart. Beck, Munich, 1998, ISBN 3-406-44058-4.
- Joachim Radkau: Holz. Wie ein Naturstoff Geschichte schreibt. Oekom, Munich, 2007, ISBN 978-3-86581-049-6
- August Seidensticker: Waldgeschichte des Alterthums. Ein Handbuch für akademische Vorlesungen, 2 vols. (I: Vor Cäsar, II.: Nach Cäsar), Trowitzsch & Sohn, Frankfurt an der Oder, 1886 [reprint: Amsterdam, 1966]
- Rolf Peter Sieferle: Der unterirdische Wald. Energiekrise und Industrielle Revolution. Beck, Munich, 1989, ISBN 3-406-08466-4.
