= Mittelhees =

- Ortsteil of Kreuztal
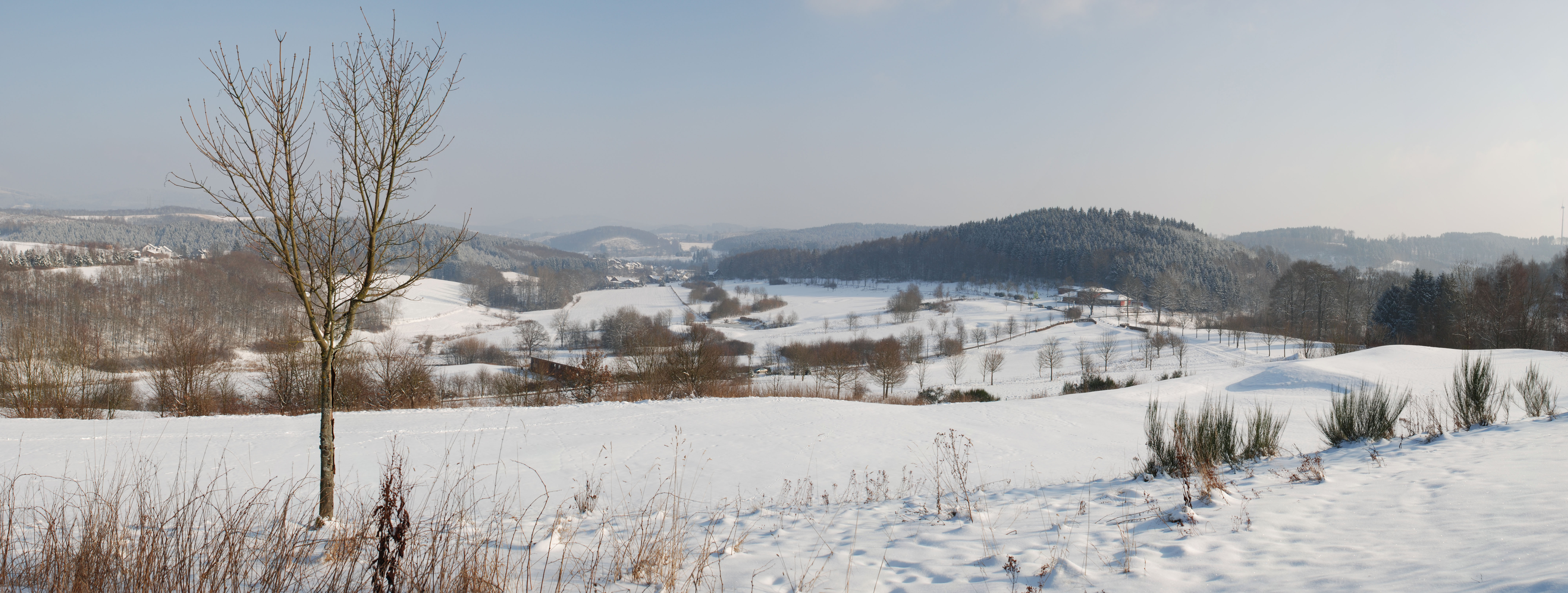
- Winter Landscape at the Golf Course
- Interactive map of Mittelhees
- Location within Germany Location within North Rhine-Westphalia
- Coordinates: 50°56′48″N 07°56′59″E
- Country: Germany
- State: North Rhine-Westphalia
- Admin. region: Arnsberg
- District: Siegen-Wittgenstein
- Town: Kreuztal

Area
  - Total: 2.03 km^{2} (0.78 sq mi)
- Elevation: 310 m (1,020 ft)
- Time zone: UTC+01:00 (CET)
  - Summer (DST): UTC+02:00 (CEST)
- Postal codes: 57223
- Dialling codes: 02732
- Vehicle registration: SI
- Website: kreuztal.de/stadtinfo-tourismus-freizeit/stadtinfo/stadtteile/mittelhees/

Mittelhees is a constituent community of Kreuztal, Siegen-Wittgenstein, North Rhine-Westphalia, Germany.

It has a population of 53 inhabitants.

Mittelhees is probably the original headquarters of the noble family of the Junker of the Hees. In the 15th century, it was referred to as the Hees in connection with the Hof Wurmbach, which still exists today and is a listed monument.

The village used to be an independent municipality. Until the communal reorganization on January 1, 1969, Mittelhees belonged to the parish of Oberholzklau as well as to the Amt Freudenberg, to which it came in 1452. Then, together with three other Heestal communities (Oberhees, Osthelden and Fellinghausen) it came to Kreuztal.

The few houses are situated in the valley of the Hees in the middle of meadows and fields. Many old farms and the rural structure have been preserved to this day. The eponymous Heesbach flows through the districts of Oberhees, Mittelhees, Junkernhees and Fellinghausen and flows into the Littfe.

Since 1997, Mittelhees has had a golf course on which the Siegerland Golf Club has been based.

== Additional images ==
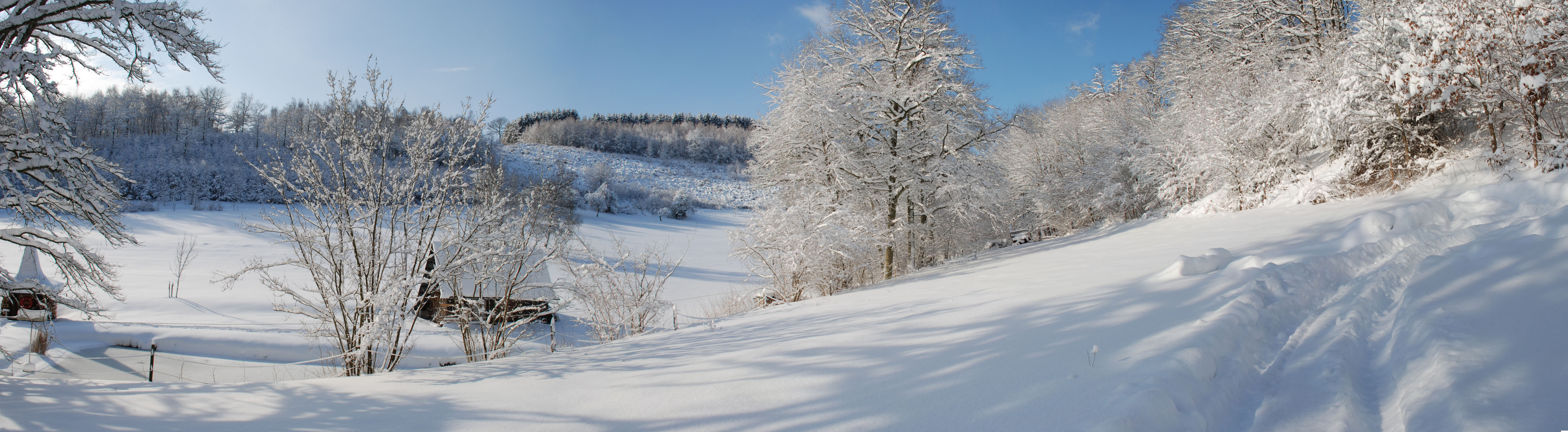
At the entrance to the golf club

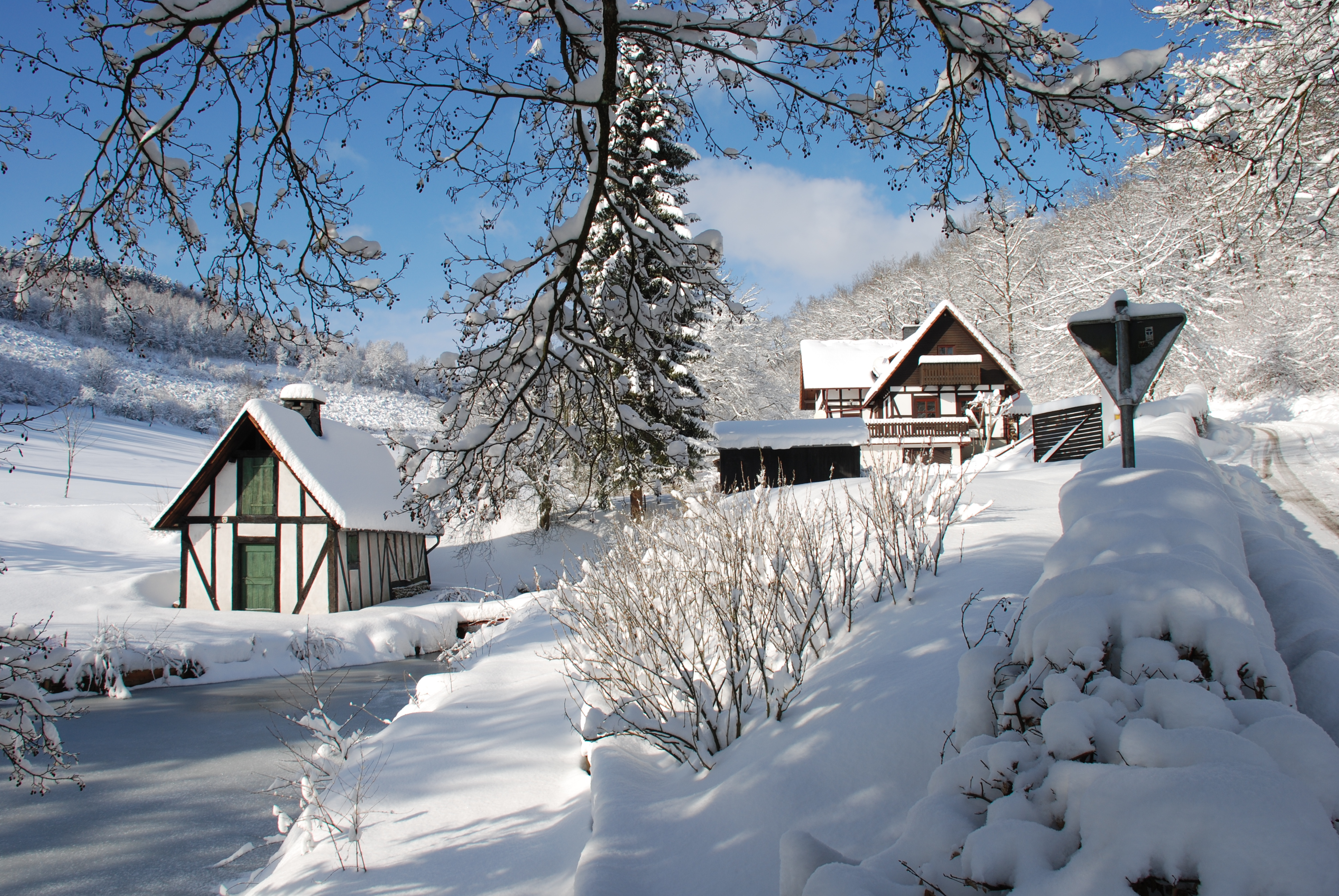
Winter 2010

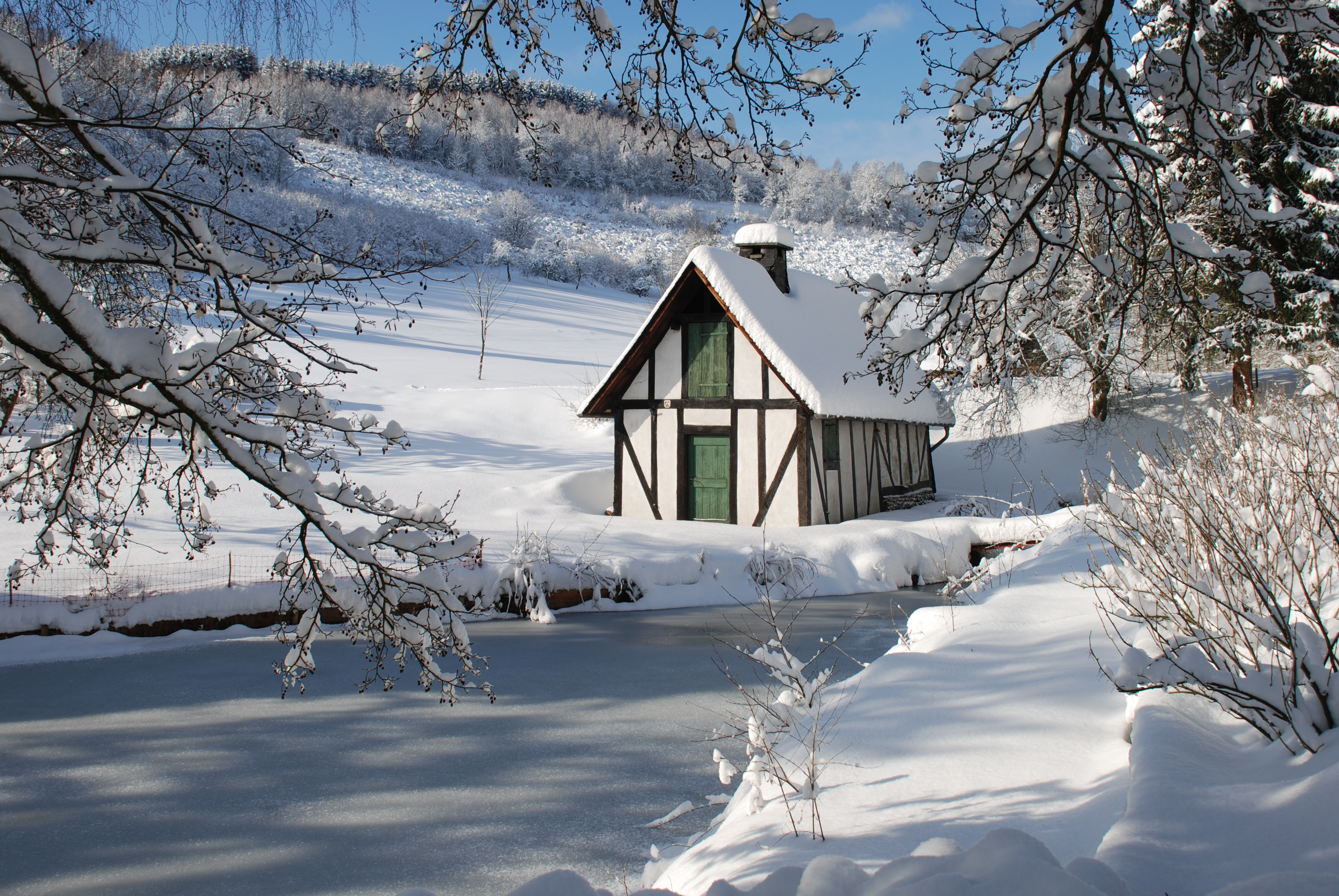
The ancient bakery in Mittelhees

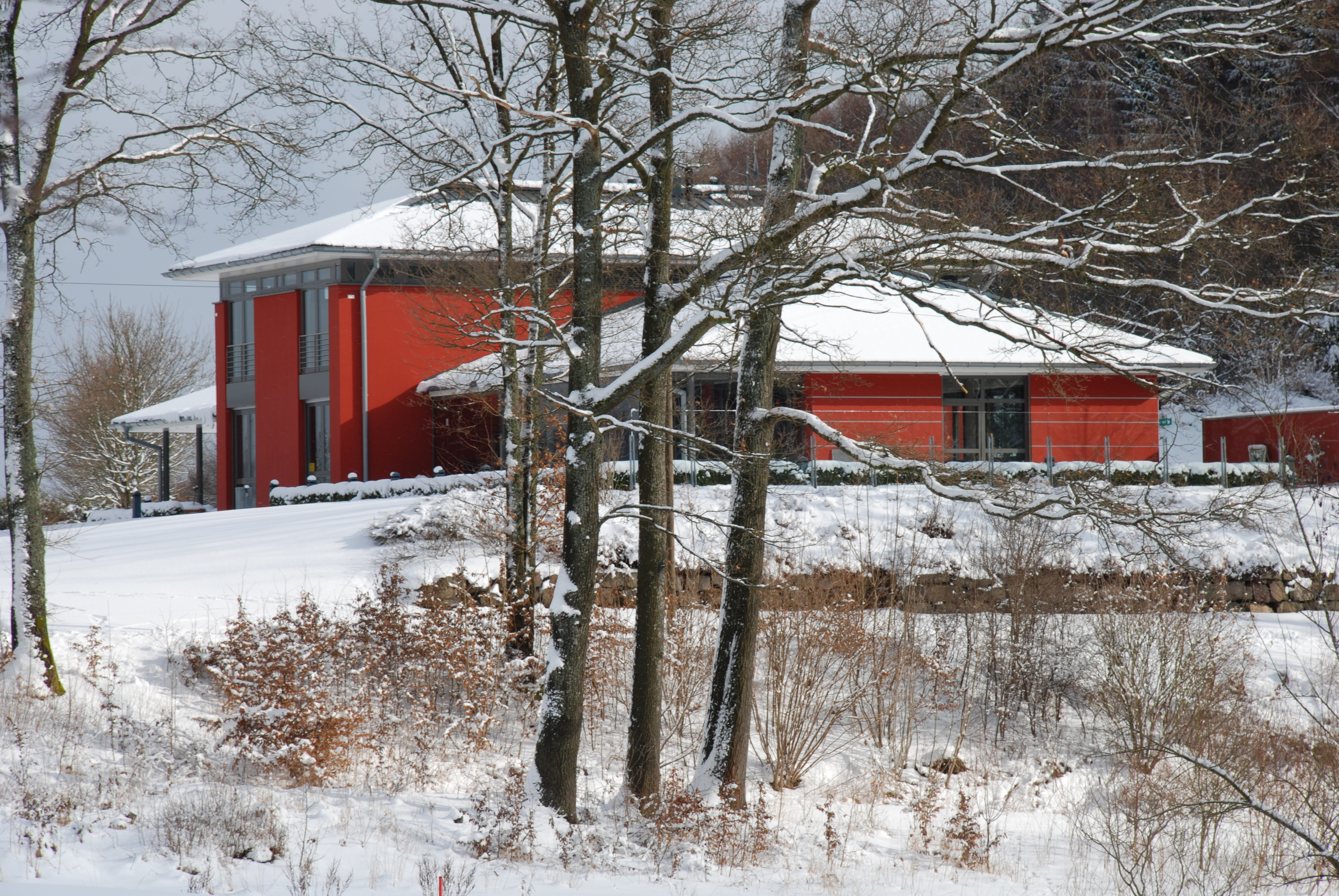
Clubhouse Golfclub Siegerland

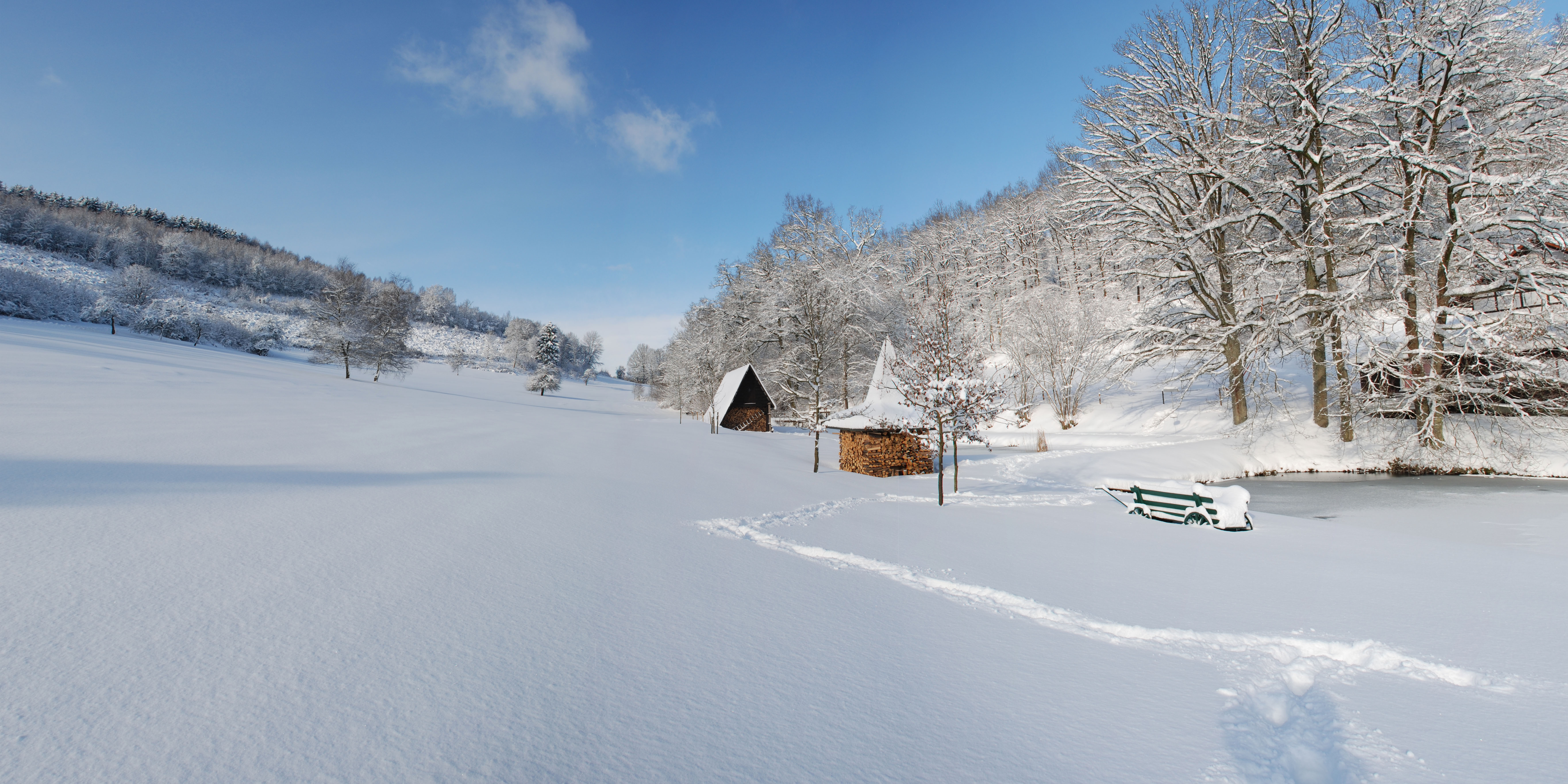
Side valley in Mittelhees at the Berghäuser Weg
