= Hainburg =

Hainburg may refer to the following places:

- Hainburg an der Donau, Lower Austria, Austria
- Hainburg, Germany, Hesse, Germany
