= Altenbrunslar =

- Part of Felsberg
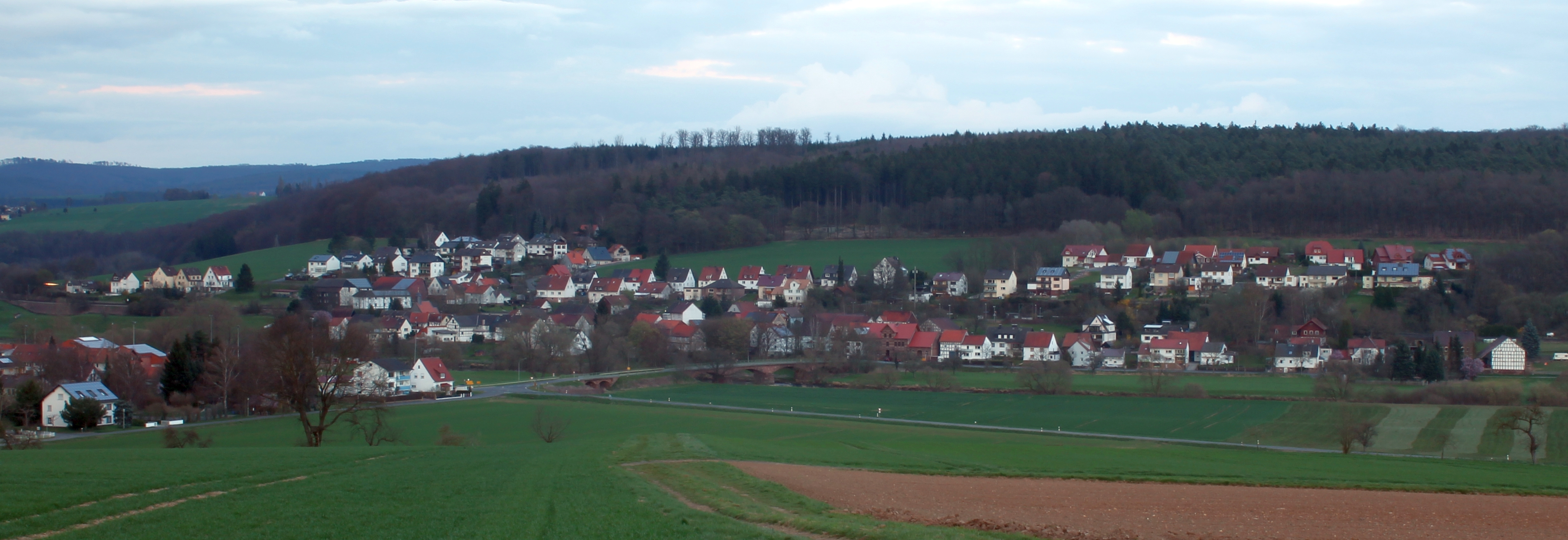
- Altenbrunslar from the west, on a spring evening
- Interactive map of Altenbrunslar
- Location within Germany Location within Hesse
- Coordinates: 51°10′1″N 9°26′43″E
- Country: Germany
- State: Hesse
- District: Schwalm-Eder-Kreis
- Town: Felsberg
- Founded: 1381

Government
  - Mayor: Günter Sippel (SPD)

Area
  - Total: 9.092 km^{2} (3.510 sq mi)
- Elevation: 154–273 m (505–896 ft)

Population (2021)
  - Total: 306
  - Density: 33.7/km^{2} (87.2/sq mi)
- Time zone: UTC+01:00 (CET)
  - Summer (DST): UTC+02:00 (CEST)
- Postal codes: 34587
- Dialling codes: 05662
- Website: www.altenbrunslar.de

Altenbunslar is a small village in North Hesse, Germany. It is part of the town Felsberg.

== Geology ==
The bedrock is composed of Triassic Buntsandstein. It is so-called because it is composed of different-coloured sandstones. The rolling hills that are caused by the nearly even weathering of the sandstones, are punctuated by steep basaltic outcrops, which are the remains of Neogene (Miocene) volcanic necks (i.e. the cone of the volcano has been eroded which left behind the harder central region (neck) where the magma previously made its way to the surface).

== Geography ==
The boundary of the village encompasses an area of about 9.1 km^{2} (3.5 sq mi), of which about 80% is covered by forest. Altenbunslar is one of the sixteen constituent communities that form the town of Felsberg in Schwalm-Eder-Kreis, North Hesse, Germany. The nearest city is Kassel, which is 23 km (14 mi) to the north. Approximately 350 people live in the village.

The village is situated on the eastern (cut) bank of the Eder River. To the east of the village is the Quillerwald (Quiller Forest) or Markwald (common forest), the latter was so named because once it belonged to all the surrounding villages, at least in terms of the right to cut wood and graze animals, but not hunting. The Eder River confluences with the Fulda River just 9 km (5.6 mi) upstream from Altenbrunslar at Edermünde (mouth of the Eder).

== History ==
=== Prehistoric times ===
The Rhünda Skull, found near the town of Rhünda, which is just south of Felsberg, proves that this area was populated already 12000 years ago. Archaeological finds show that around c. 2900–2450 cal. BC, in the nearby Quiller Forest, a prehistoric people of the Corded Ware culture settled. During the building of the A7 motorway in 1935, many burial mounds were found on Schleifsteinskopf, a hill within Quiller Forest (see above). Around the same time, the Riesenstein, a menhir weighing more than 40 metric tons (39 long tons), was erected close to Wolfershausen.

=== Middle Ages ===
The first mention of the place Bruneslar was in 1154. The first recognised use of the name Altenbrunslar was in a document from 1381, in the list of possessions of Friedrich III von Hertingshausen († 1422), a knight from the surrounding area.

In 1527, after the Protestant Reformation, Johannes Bonecker (Bydenkap), a monk from the Breitenau Monastery, applied for the post of vicar in Altenbrunslar. The first Protestant vicar installed in the chapel was Ludolphus (given name, family name unknown) from 1528 to 1534.

=== Modern history ===
In 1639, the village was named Altenbraunßlar in the hessische Mannschaftsregister. Brunslar has always been an important location for armies to cross the River Eder. For instance, in the Seven Years' War, when in 1760 John Manners, Marquess of Granby lead his troops to confront the French, he bridged the River Eder at Brunslar.

=== Railway ===
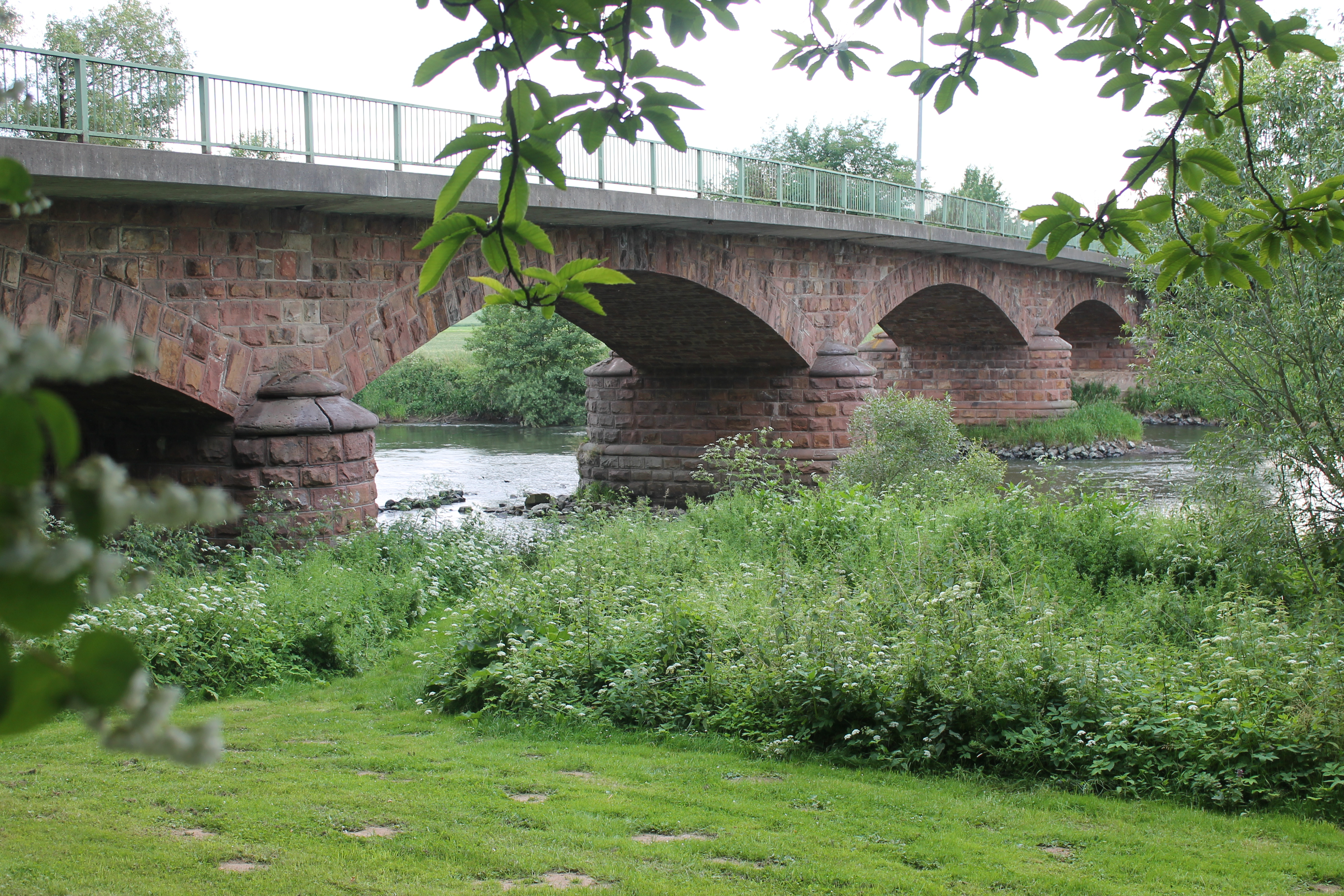
The sandstone bridge over the River Eder at Altenbrunslar

The first section of the Main–Weser Railway between Kassel and Wabern, running directly through Altenbrunslar, was opened on 29 December 1849. The first train to pass through Altenbrunslar was pulled by the Henschel locomotive Hassia The first continuous rail service from Kassel to Frankfurt ran on 15 May 1852, although there wasn't a railway station at Altenbrunslar to start with. After petitioning, a station was constructed in 1902.

=== 20th century ===
During the Second World War, the Allies bombed and breached the Edersee Dam in the night of 16–17 May 1943, as part of Operation Chastise. The resultant flood wave hit Altenbrunslar half an hour later (the dam is about 30 km (19 mi) upstream). The population of Altenbrunslar fled into the forest after they were warned by radio. The whole Eder Valley and most of the village was flooded, but the bridge mostly stood up to the water and only the upper part was in need of repair afterwards. A number of houses close to the river were damaged.

=== Administration ===
From 1413 to 1807 and from 1813 to 1821, Altenbrunslar belonged to the administration of Felsberg, from 1807 to 1813 to the Canton of Gensungen of Napoleon's Kingdom of Westphalia, and from 1821 onwards to the District of Melsungen (Landkreis Melsungen), which, in 1866, became part of the Kingdom of Prussia. On 1 February 1971, Altenbrunslar joined Neuenbrunslar to become the Brunslar Community. This was incorporated into the town of Felsberg on 1 January 1974.

== Architecture ==
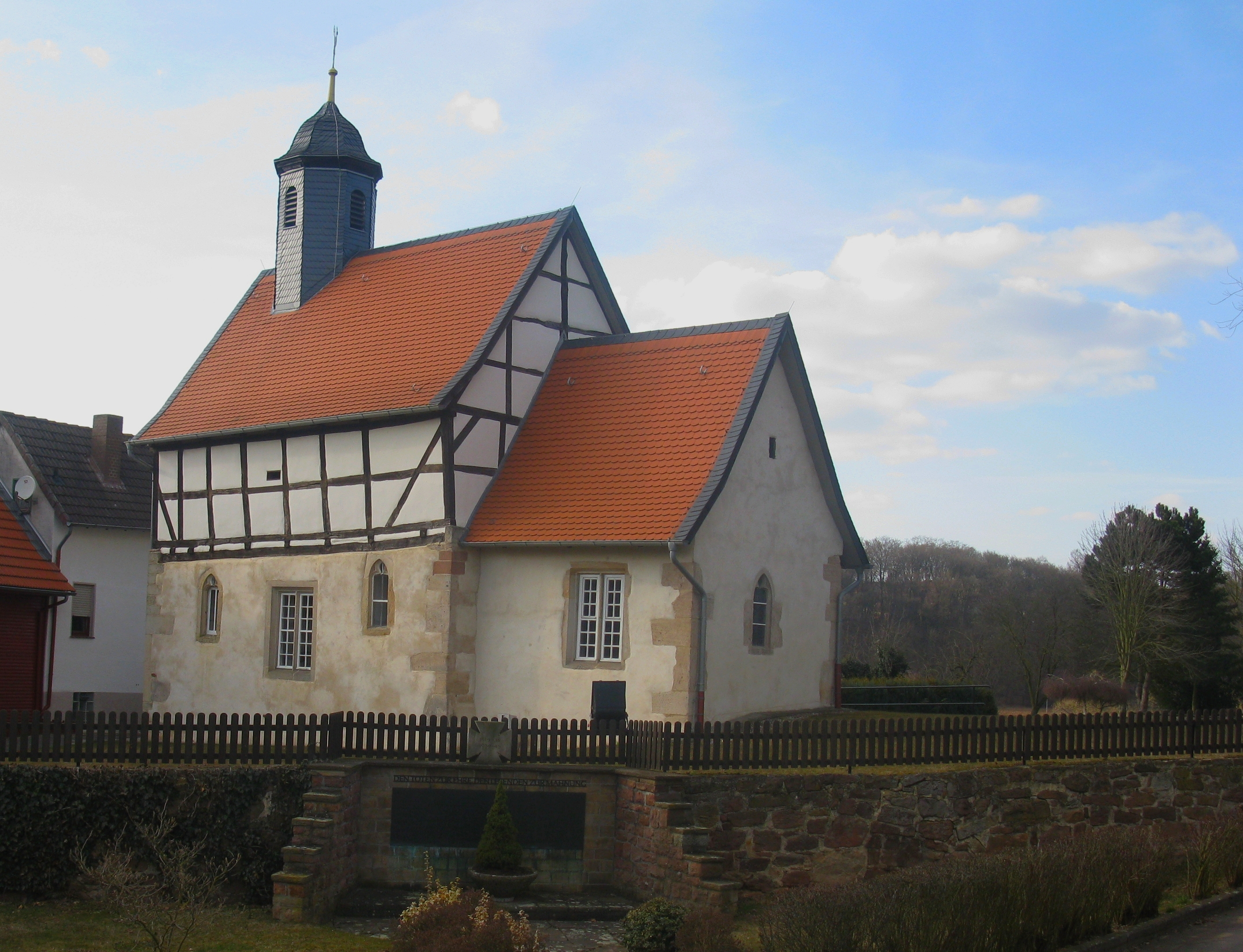
The chapel in Altenbrunslar

The first permanent sandstone bridge over the Eder River at Altenbrunslar was built in 1885. Before this bridge, there was only a temporary wooden bridge in summer and a ferryman in winter.

The small, evangelical chapel in Altenbrunslar is an object of cultural heritage. It was originally built, probably at the beginning of the 10th century, in the romanesque style, but later a gothic style choir was added. Above the aisle is a half-timbered upper level that was constructed in 1681. The upper level was used in the past as a granary.

In 2000, the chapel was completely renovated.

The church bell is reported to have come from the nearby ruined village of Brechelsdorf. On the bell is written in Gothic script:

"im jahr des herren 1487 gegrüßt seist du maria" (in the year of the Lord 1487 greetings to thee Mary).

== Transport ==
The village has its own railway station. NVV trains connects to the north with the main Intercity-Express railway station at Kassel-Wilhelmshöhe in 22 minutes, and then they travel on to Kassel main station. To the south, Wabern is 16 minutes away.

The bridge over the Eder at Altenbrunslar is an important traffic route in North Hesse. The Landesstraße (state road) L3222 crosses the bridge from Neuenbrunslar towards Melsungen, and is joined in Altenbrunslar by the Kreisstraße (district road) K151 from Ellenberg.

== Adjacent communities ==
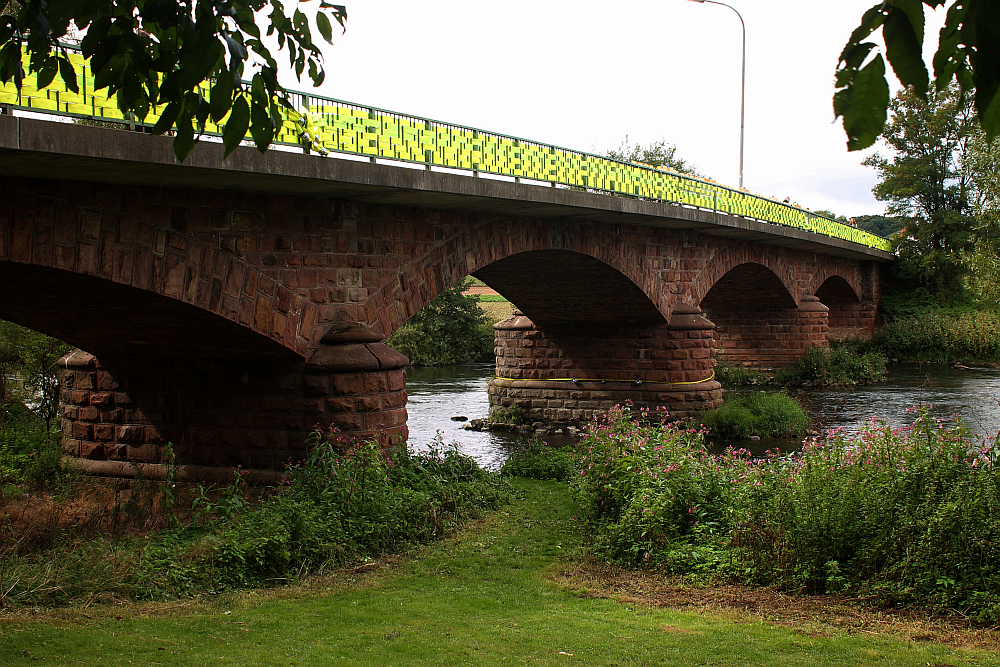
Fire hoses woven into the fences on the sides of the Brunslar bridge.

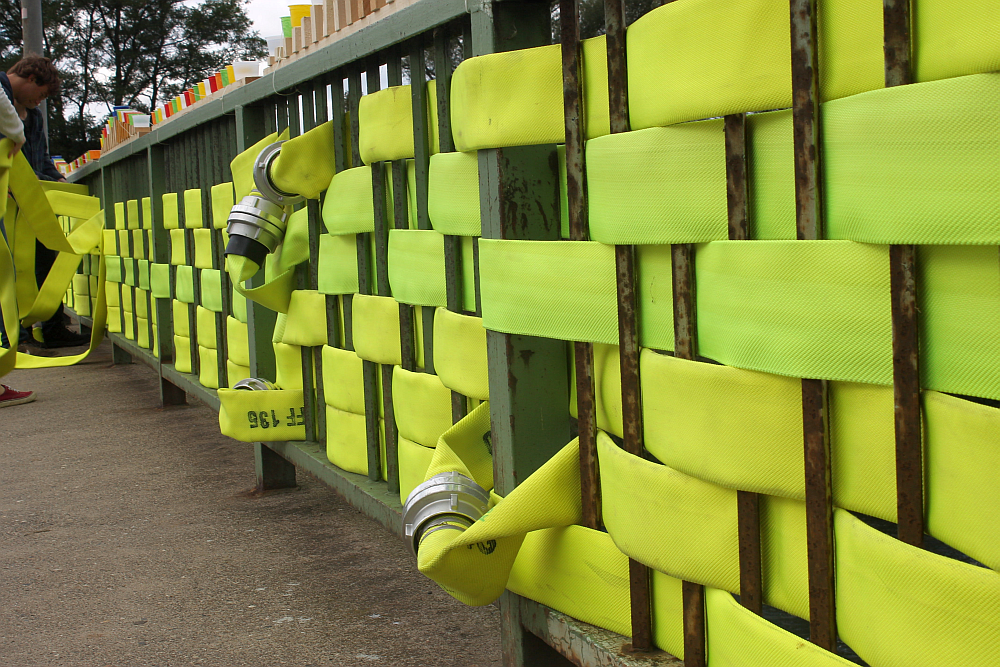
Close-up of fire hoses woven into the posts of the fences on the sides of the Brunslar bridge.

== Twin towns ==
Altenbrunslar, through Felsberg, is twinned with the following towns:

- Vernouillet, France, since 1982.
- Cheddar, United Kingdom, since 1987.

It also has friendship agreements with these places:

- (Germany) Felsberg, a constituent community of Überherrn, Saarland
- Felsberg, Graubünden, Switzerland
- (Germany) Dingelstädt, Thuringia

A school exchange system between Felsberg school and collège Marcel-Pagnol in Vernouillet has been in operation for the last 30 years.

== Famous people ==
- Konrad Belz (born 30 December 1887 in Altenbrunslar, died 7 March 1936 in Haina). Because he was a member of the communist party, he was imprisoned at Breitenau concentration camp in early March 1933. He was released shortly after, but died as a result of the brain embolism he suffered in the hands of the SA. In 2013, a metal plate was set in to the pavement in Kassel (Henkelstraße 13) to commemorate his life.

== Art events ==
On the weekend of 5–6 September 2015, Alten- and Neunenbrunslar held a bridge party (German: Brückenfest Brunslar) to celebrate the sandstone bridge over the Eder. Otto W. Werren, a local artist, had the idea to weave old fire brigade hoses, which have a bright yellow-green colour, into the posts of the handrails on the side of the bridge. This was carried out by the youth of the villages. For the weekend, the bridge was illuminated with different coloured lights.

External videos
- Hessischer Rundfunk article about the Brückenfest, YouTube video

== In popular media ==
Altenbrunslar was chosen as Dolles Dorf (English: great village) in the Hessischer Rundfunk television programme of the same name. A ten-minute film about the village was broadcast on 25 August 2012.
