= Junkernhees =

- Ortsteil of Kreuztal
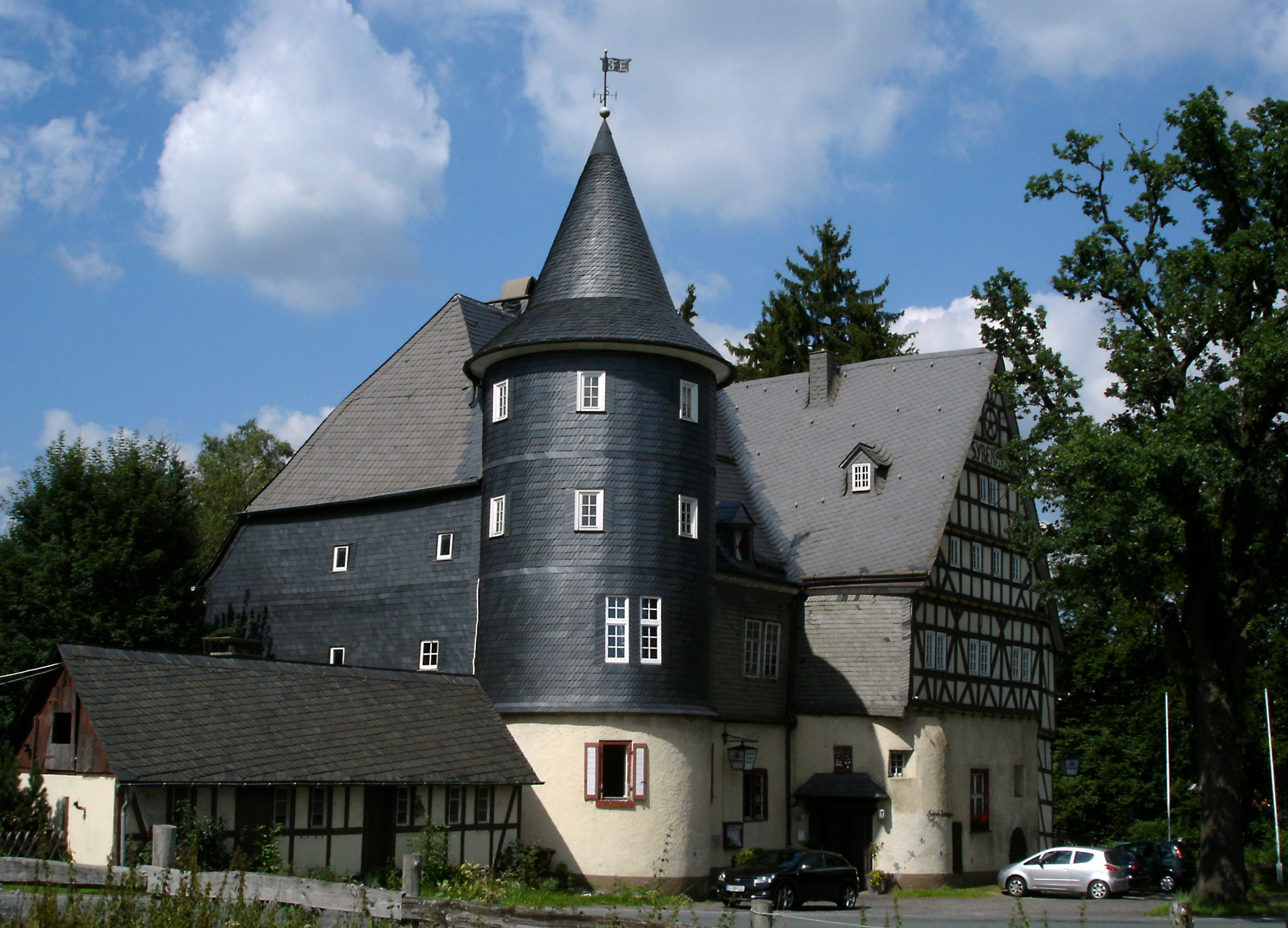
- Junkernhees Castle
- Interactive map of Junkernhees
- Location within Germany Location within North Rhine-Westphalia
- Coordinates: 50°57′05″N 07°57′30″E
- Country: Germany
- State: North Rhine-Westphalia
- Admin. region: Arnsberg
- District: Siegen-Wittgenstein
- Town: Kreuztal
- Founded: 1294

Area
  - Total: 1.49 km^{2} (0.58 sq mi)
- Elevation: 300 m (980 ft)
- Time zone: UTC+01:00 (CET)
  - Summer (DST): UTC+02:00 (CEST)
- Postal codes: 57223
- Dialling codes: 02732
- Vehicle registration: SI
- Website: kreuztal.de/stadtinfo-tourismus-freizeit/stadtinfo/stadtteile/junkernhees/

Junkernhees is a constituent community of Kreuztal, Siegen-Wittgenstein, North Rhine-Westphalia, Germany.

It has a population of 253 inhabitants.

It is embedded in the Heesbach valley and surrounded by forests. The approx. 70 houses are spread over a quite large area and are crossed by the L712 highway. Northbound, Junkernhees borders on Osthelden. In the west are the districts of Mittelhees and Oberhees. In the east follows first Fellinghausen and then Kreuztal.

At the end of the village towards Mittelhees there is an old cultural monument, the Junkernhees Castle.

== History ==
The name Hees comes from the Heesern, who settled there about 700 years ago. Junkernhees was first mentioned in 1294.

Until the communal reorganization in North Rhine-Westphalia on January 1, 1969, Junkernhees was a district of the former community of Osthelden.
