= Hainburg, Germany =

Hainburg
- Municipality
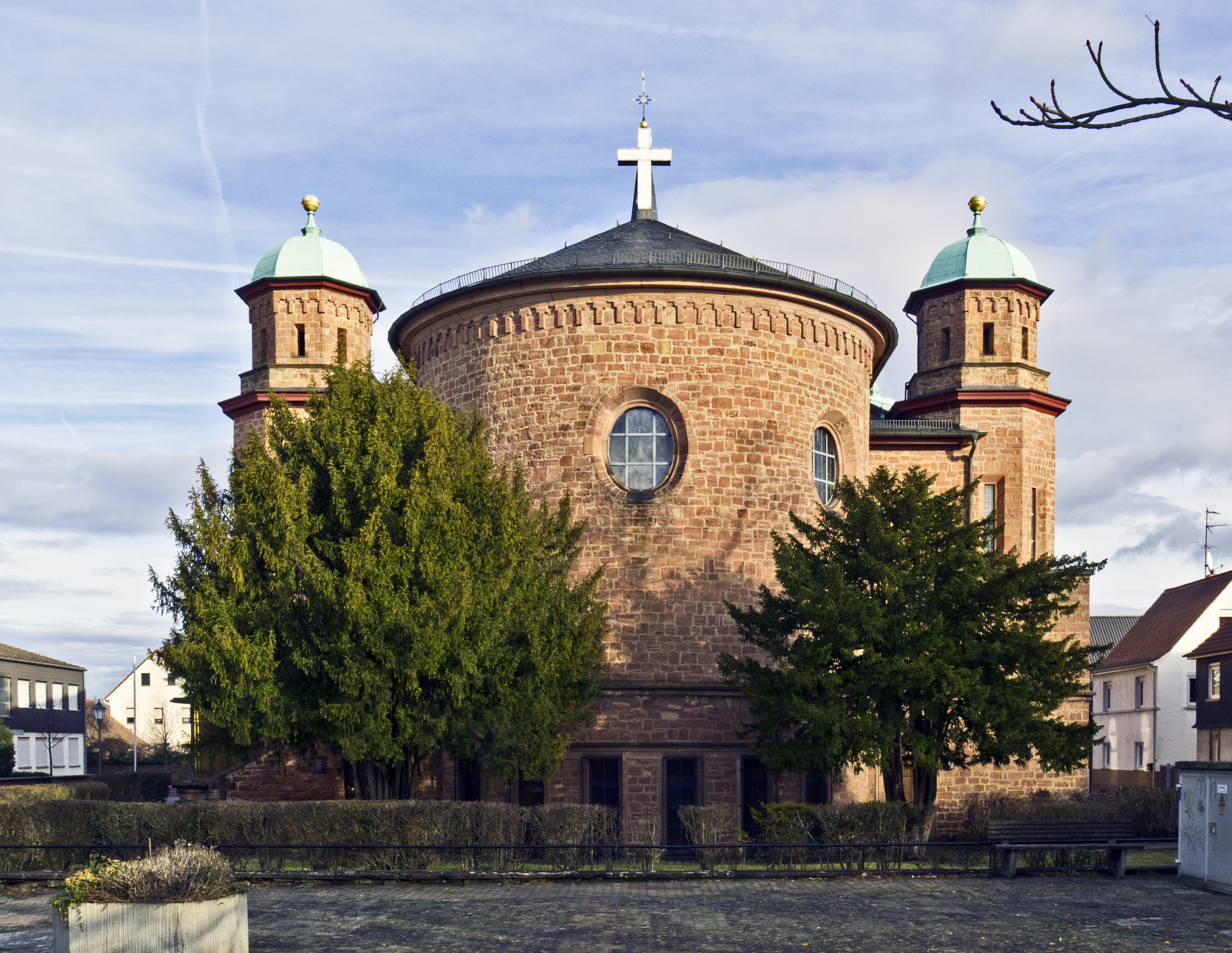
- Church of Saint Wendelin in Hainstadt

- Coat of arms

- Location of Hainburg within Offenbach district
- Interactive map of Hainburg
- Location within Germany Location within Hesse
- Coordinates: 50°5′N 8°56′E
- Country: Germany
- State: Hesse
- Admin. region: Darmstadt
- District: Offenbach

Government
  - Mayor (2022–28): Alexander Böhn (CDU)

Area
  - Total: 15.94 km^{2} (6.15 sq mi)
- Elevation: 90 m (300 ft)

Population (2025-12-31)
  - Total: 14,516
  - Density: 910.7/km^{2} (2,359/sq mi)
- Time zone: UTC+01:00 (CET)
  - Summer (DST): UTC+02:00 (CEST)
- Postal codes: 63512
- Dialling codes: 06182
- Vehicle registration: OF
- Website: www.hainburg.de

Hainburg (German pronunciation: [ˈhaɪnbʊʁk]) is a municipality of just under 14,400 inhabitants in the Offenbach district in the Regierungsbezirk of Darmstadt in Hesse, Germany.

== Geography ==
=== Location ===
Hainburg is one of 13 towns and communities in the Offenbach district. The town lies at the edge of the Frankfurt Rhine Main Region on the bank of the Main. It lies east of Frankfurt am Main. In the north is found the town of Hanau (Main-Kinzig-Kreis). Hainburg lies in the southern part of Hesse and borders in the east on the state of Bavaria.

=== Neighbouring communities ===
Hainburg borders in the north on the town of Hanau and the community of Großkrotzenburg (both in the Main-Kinzig-Kreis), in the east on the communities of Kahl and Karlstein (both in the Aschaffenburg district in Bavaria), in the south on the town of Seligenstadt and in the west on the towns of Rodgau and Obertshausen.

=== Municipal area’s extent ===
The municipal area stretches over just under 16 km².

Hainburg am Main is, with regards to transport, well linked to the surrounding towns and communities.

=== Constituent communities ===
Hainburg's two Ortsteile are Hainstadt and Klein-Krotzenburg, with the latter's population being about 2,000 fewer than the former's.

== History ==
=== Hainstadt ===
Near Hainstadt are preserved the remains of a Roman settlement. It is, however, questionable whether there was continuous settlement here between the time when this was built and the 12th century, when Hainstadt had its first documentary mention.

Hainstadt's coat of arms

When Gottfried of Eppstein sold Electoral Mainz the Amt of Steinheim with all the places belonging thereto in 1425, the Electors and Archbishops of Mainz took over as the new landlords. In 1532, the compulsory labour that Hainstadt people would ordinarily have to have done was cast aside in favour of payments in money.

When the Auheimer Mark (an old cadastral unit) was partitioned in 1786, Hainstadt was given part of the Markwald (common forest). After Electoral Mainz's Secularization, the Oberamt of Steinheim passed in 1803 to the Landgraviate of Hesse-Darmstadt. In 1882, the Hanau-Eberbach railway was opened, with a railway station in Hainstadt.

On 1 January 1977, in the course of municipal reform in Hesse, Hainstadt was merged with the neighbouring community of Klein-Krotzenburg under the name Hainburg.

=== Klein-Krotzenburg ===
Klein-Krotzenburg's coat of arms

Cutzenburch had its first documentary mention in 1175 in a legal battle between the Seligenstadt Abbey and Saint Peter's Monastery in Mainz. The Seligenstadt Abbey at this time had extensive landholdings in Krotzenburg. Already by this time, the Prince-Elector-Archbishop of Mainz was the landlord in Klein-Krotzenburg.

During the Thirty Years' War, the populace suffered mightily. In 1632 alone, 90 inhabitants died of the Plague. By the war's end, everyone had fled the village.

In 1736, a chapel was built on the Liebfrauenheide (heath), which soon became a pilgrimage site. After Electoral Mainz's Secularization, the Oberamt of Steinheim passed in 1803 to the Landgraviate of Hesse-Darmstadt, bringing Klein-Krotzenburg with it.

On 1 January 1977, in the course of municipal reform in Hesse, Klein-Krotzenburg was merged with the neighbouring community of Hainstadt under the name Hainburg.

== Politics ==
=== Community council ===
The municipal election held on 26 March 2006 yielded the following results:

Parties and voter communities		% 2006	Seats; 2006	% 2001	Seats; 2001
CDU	Christian Democratic Union of Germany	54.5	20	58.7	22
SPD	Social Democratic Party of Germany	26.8	10	25.1	9
GREENS	Bündnis 90/Die Grünen	7.8	3	6.7	2
FDP	Free Democratic Party	4.3	2	4.5	2
BFH	Bürger für Hainburg	6.7	2	5.0	2
Total		100.0	37	100.0	37
Voter turnout in %		51.4		56.8	

=== Mayor ===
The current mayor, Bernhard Bessel (CDU), who has been in office since 1993, was reëlected on 12 September 2004 for a third term on the first vote with 64.8% of the ballots cast. Voter turnout was 59.1%.

=== Town partnerships ===
- Vernouillet, Yvelines, France
- Alberndorf im Pulkautal, Lower Austria, Austria
- Retz, Lower Austria, Austria
- Trumau, Lower Austria, Austria

=== Sponsorship ===
In 1975, the community took on the sponsorship for Sudeten Germans driven out of the communities of Peterswald (now Petrovice u Chabařovic) and Nollendorf (now Nakléřov) in the Aussig district.

== Transport ==
The constituent community of Hainstadt lies on the Odenwaldbahn (railway; RMV Line 65), which links the community to Hanau, Frankfurt, Wiebelsbach-Heubach and Erbach.

Towards the west runs the Offenbacher Landstraße or Landesstraße 3416 to Bundesstraße 45 and the A 3. Northwards, Landesstraße 3065 goes towards Hanau, and southwards towards Seligenstadt.
