= Osthelden =

- Ortsteil of Kreuztal
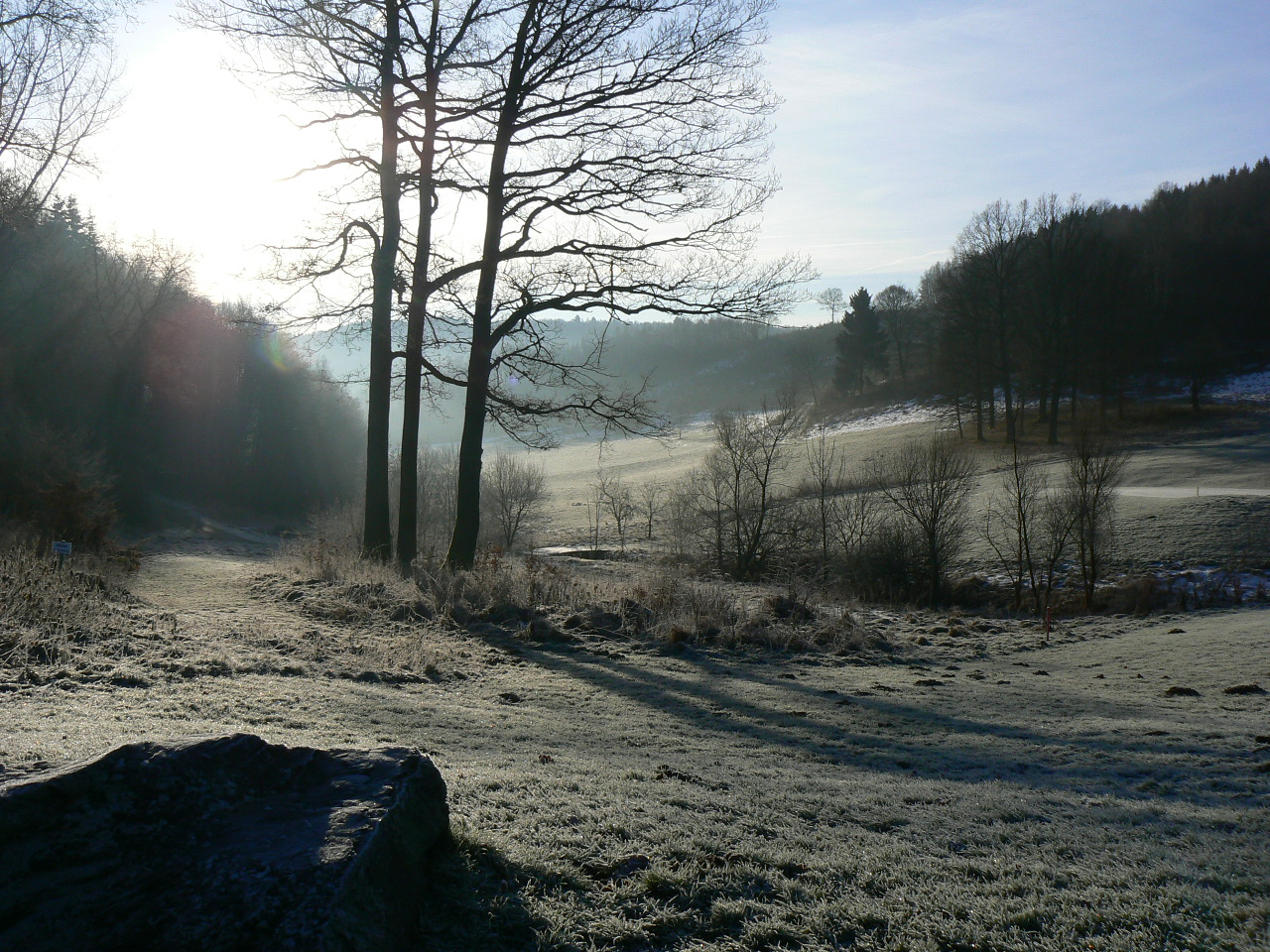
- View over the Berghäuser valley near Osthelden in winter

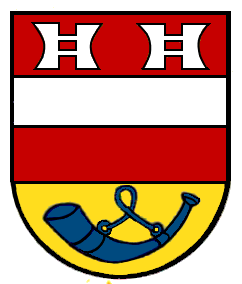
- Coat of arms
- Interactive map of Osthelden
- Location within Germany Location within North Rhine-Westphalia
- Coordinates: 50°57′40″N 07°56′40″E
- Country: Germany
- State: North Rhine-Westphalia
- Admin. region: Arnsberg
- District: Siegen-Wittgenstein
- Town: Kreuztal
- Founded: 1344

Area
  - Total: 3.65 km^{2} (1.41 sq mi)
- Elevation: 326 m (1,070 ft)
- Time zone: UTC+01:00 (CET)
  - Summer (DST): UTC+02:00 (CEST)
- Postal codes: 57223
- Dialling codes: 02732
- Vehicle registration: SI
- Website: kreuztal.de/stadtinfo-tourismus-freizeit/stadtinfo/stadtteile/osthelden/

Osthelden is a constituent community of Kreuztal, Siegen-Wittgenstein, North Rhine-Westphalia, Germany and has its name from the stream Osthelde. It is located on the road from Wenden to Kreuztal, where the road descends into the valley with a sharp bend and has 710 inhabitants.

== History ==
Osthelden is one of the oldest settlements in the Siegerland. There is no document about its origin. In terms of folk culture, Osthelden is a Moselle Franconian-speaking place and is situated on the Uerdinger and Benrather lines. It is unclear since when the first humans used the protected hollow on the upper reaches of the Osthelden stream as a settlement. The first written reference to Osthelden can be found in the Bickenschen Mannbuch, a feudal register of the Lords of Bicken. There it says (in today's words): Anno Domini 1344 - "The Lords of Bicken (Burg Hainchen/Netphen) had left the tenth rights in Osthelden and Fellinghausen to the Gobel von der Hees".

For the year 1461, five persons subject to statutory requirements are named. Nine households are mentioned in a tax list from 1563. The first exact map "Markung des Dorfes Osthelden" was produced in 1720 by Erich Philipp Ploennies.

Of the 28 buildings drawn in the register of 1834, 24 are residential buildings. The oldest surviving house in Osthelden - built in 1657 - was demolished in 2003.

Until the communal reorganization in North Rhine-Westphalia on January 1, 1969, Osthelden was an independent municipality, which included today's Kreuztal borough Junkernhees. The places were part of the Amt Ferndorf at that time.

== Famous people ==
- Andreas Kuhl, born 1979, world champion in German ju-jutsu
