= Brechelsdorf =

Coordinates: 51.1700°N 9.4600°E

Brechelsdorf was a village that was abandoned around the 14th to 15th century AD. There are no visible remains today. It was situated within the perimeter of the village of Altenbrunslar, which part of the town of Felsberg, in the district of Schwalm-Eder-Kreis in North Hesse, Germany.

== Location ==
The village was situated approximately 1 km (0.62 mi) north of Altenbrunslar, on the eastern bank of the River Eder. It was on a small plateau, about 250 m (820 ft) above sea level, within the forest.

== History ==
In 1319 the village was called Brecholdisdorf, in the years 1418 und 1419 as Brekelstorff, Brechtoldistorf and Brechelsdorf, and in 1360 it was known as Frekolsdorf. It is probable that the village was abandoned during the 1346–1353 outbreak of the Black Death pandemic in middle Europe. By 1410, the village had been registered as abandoned. In the Salbuch of Breitenau, written in the year 1579, the village is described as a ruined farm with farmyard, which is used by the people of Altenbrunslar.

In 1848, an urn of ashes was found on the site. A field was still named Breckelsdorf (in local dialect as Brächelsdorf) in 1930's.

The church bell in the chapel at Altenbrunslar is purported to have come from Brechelsdorf, but the inscription on the bell; im jahr des herren 1487 gegrüßt seist du maria (English: in the year of the Lord 1487 greetings to thee Mary), makes this questionable.
