= Brunslar =

- Interactive map of Brunslar
- Location within Germany Location within Hesse
- Coordinates: 51°10′1″N 9°26′43″E
- Country: Germany
- State: Hesse
- District: Melsungen
- Disbanded: 1 January 1974

Area
  - Total: 16.41 km^{2} (6.34 sq mi)
- Elevation: 154–273 m (505–896 ft)

Population (1974)
  - Total: 2,000
  - Density: 120/km^{2} (320/sq mi)
- Time zone: UTC+01:00 (CET)
  - Summer (DST): UTC+02:00 (CEST)

Brunslar was a short-lived municipality in North Hessen, in the now-extinct district of Melsungen, Germany. It was established during the change of district boundaries on 1 February 1971, when the independent communities of Altenbrunslar and Neuenbrunslar fused. On the 31. December 1971 the community of Wolfershausen joined the Brunslar municipality.

At the beginning, the municipality covered an area of 1271 ha, in which approx. 1300 people lived. As the village of Wolfershausen was integrated, the area expanded to 1641 ha and the population increased to approximately 2000 residents.

On 1 January 1974 the municipality of Brunslar, together with the municipalities of Gensungen, Helmshausen, Hilgershausen und Rhünda were included into the town of Felsberg.
