= Wildbannforst =

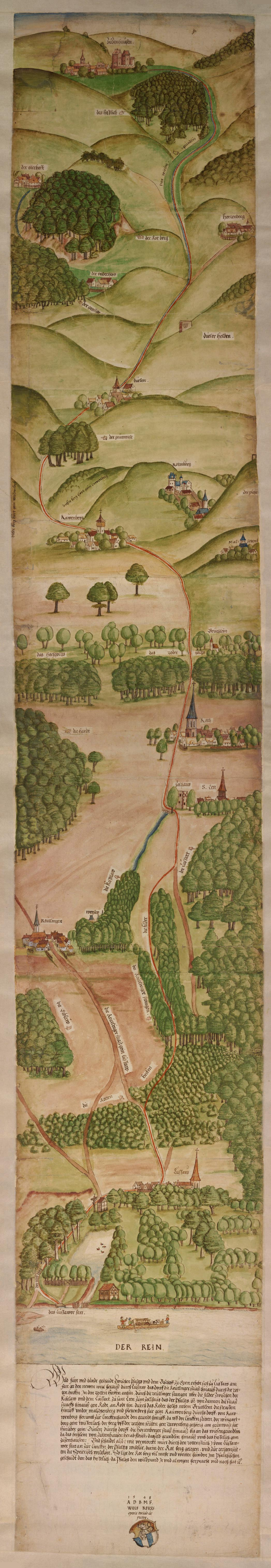
The wildbann boundary between Electoral Palatinate and the Bishopric of Speyer, 1548

A Wildbann ("wildlife ban") in the Holy Roman Empire was a specific form of royal hunting privilege.

The forest referred to in a Wildbann was called a Wildbannforst ("wildlife ban forest") or Bannforst ("ban forest"). Originally only the king had the right to hunt in a wildbann. Hunting rights were also delegated to others for a fee. They had to pay the so-called wildgeld ("wildlife money").

Before the 9th century, royal forests were known as forestes [singular: forestis]. A forestis was a legally recognised region that could be used by the king. This right included the use of forest produce (such as timber), hunting, fishing and clearing. Royal rights over any unoccupied land (ius eremi) were the legal basis for the establishment of the forestes. From the 8th century the Church and the nobility also established such forestes or took over former royal forestes.

As a result of the increasing importance of hunting during the 9th century, the designation of these areas changed from forestis to wildbann. The wildbann was a hunting area under the king's ban, which extended over a region that could belong to a number of landowners. In addition to hunting rights, the king also exercised supervision of the forest within his wildbann.

In the 15th century the word wildbann was replaced by the term Forst ("forest"). A Forst was an area over which "forest sovereignty" (Forsthoheit) was exercised.

To protect such a forest and its wildlife, several so-called Wildhuben ("wildlife hides", probably forester's huts) were established. These were lived in by foresters.

The management of a wildbann lay in the hands of a vogt (bailiff). Together the bailiffs and foresters guaranteed oversight of the king's forest.

== See also ==
- Bannwald

== Literature ==
- Richard B. Hilf: Der Wald. Wald und Weidwerk in Geschichte und Gegenwart - Erster Teil [Reprint]. Aula, Wiebelsheim, 2003, ISBN 3-494-01331-4
- Hans Hausrath: Geschichte des deutschen Waldbaus. Von seinen Anfängen bis 1850. Series by the Institute for Forest and Regional Administration of the University of Freiburg. Hochschulverlag, Freiburg im Breisgau, 1982, ISBN 3-8107-6803-0
