= Cyclic succession =

Pattern of vegetation change

Cyclic succession is a pattern of vegetation change in which in a small number of species tend to replace each other over time in the absence of large-scale disturbance. Observations of cyclic replacement have provided evidence against traditional Clementsian views of an end-state climax community with stable species compositions. Cyclic succession is one of several kinds of ecological succession, a concept in community ecology.

When used narrowly, 'cyclic succession' refers to processes not initiated by wholesale exogenous disturbances or long-term physical changes in the environment. However, broader cyclic processes can also be observed in cases of secondary succession in which regular disturbances such as insect outbreaks can 'reset' an entire community to a previous stage.

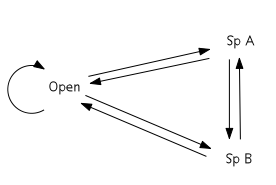
Graphic Model of Cyclic Succession

These examples differ from the classic cases of cyclic succession discussed below in that entire species groups are exchanged, as opposed to one species for another.

On geologic time scales, climate cycles can result in cyclic vegetation changes by directly altering the physical environment.

== History ==
The cyclic model of succession was proposed in 1947 by British ecologist Alexander Watt. In a seminal paper on vegetation patterns in grass, heath, and bog communities, Watt describes the plant community is a regenerating entity consisting of a "space-time mosaic" of species, whose cyclic behavior can be characterized by patch dynamics. Based on the current composition and its corresponding stage of succession, he explains, a community can either be in an 'upgrade' phase toward late-successional shrubs or 'downgrade' degenerate phase toward grasses. These phases would occur in a predictable cycle. Watt's study has since become a classic example frequently cited in scientific ecology.

== Modeling cyclic succession ==
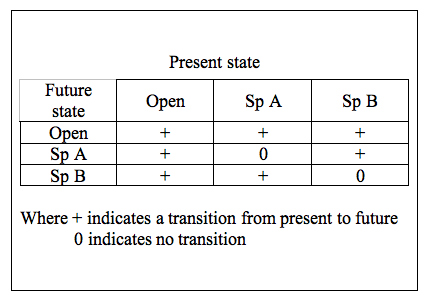
Cyclic Succession Matrix

The cyclic model of succession can be displayed in terms of a transition matrix. Based on the Markov chain, the matrix describes the likelihood of future states based on the milieu of present states. The three states in the simplest cyclic model are open substrate (usually a bare patch of land), Species A dominance, and Species B dominance. With respect to facilitation, inhibition, and tolerance models of succession, the key feature of the cyclic model is that A and B are not autosuccessional – that is, they do not facilitate their own growth. Rather, A will either facilitate the succession of B or be eliminated (through mortality) such that the patch occupied becomes open substrate. Likewise, B will either facilitate the succession of A or be eliminated. Open substrate can remain open or become occupied by either A or B. This configuration results in a cyclic scheme of species dominance.

== Mechanisms ==
Cyclic succession is a descriptive phenomenon that can be accounted for in several ways. In Watt's bog system, he suggested that factors endogenous to the plant species were at play. He writes, "Each patch in this space-time mosaic is dependent on its neighbours and develops under conditions partly imposed by them." In other words, species life history characteristics fluctuate cyclically under the influence of surrounding species. These periodic shifts in life history properties produce observable changes in community composition. In the system Watt observed, phasic development was specifically responsible for changes in growth and mortality rate.

As a result of changes in survival and growth ability, the balance of species dominance shifts, thus marking discrete stages. If the milieu of interspecific relationships satisfies the conditions described in the model above, a cyclic pattern of succession is observed.

Exogenous factors, such as depredation by herbivores, can also be indirect drivers for cyclic succession if they differentially modulate plant life history properties over time. Density-dependent root gnawing by rodents is proposed as one such mechanism in the Larrea-Opuntia system. Watt noted that cyclic fluctuations in mortality rate could also be produced through differential response to seasonal conditions like frost.

Patterns of cyclic succession cannot be readily linked to any single species, as Watt's Calluna bushes have been observed in non-cyclic systems. Rather, it is the aggregate composition of species that gives rise to the cyclic process.

== Additional empirical evidence ==
Strong empirical evidence for cyclic succession can be found in Watt's follow-up publication on the bracken system in the Journal of Ecology. Calluna vulgaris and Pteridium aquilinum were found to replace each other.

Another salient example of cyclic replacement occurs in a two-species plant community in the Sonoran Desert. Even though water availability is limiting such that only one species would be predicted to survive, Larrea tridentata and Opuntia leptocaulis are observed to replace each other in the absence of environmental disturbance.
