= Fellinghausen =

- Ortsteil of Kreuztal
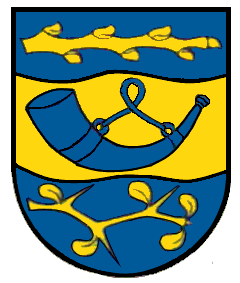
- Coat of arms
- Interactive map of Fellinghausen
- Location within Germany Location within North Rhine-Westphalia
- Coordinates: 50°57′28″N 07°58′32″E
- Country: Germany
- State: North Rhine-Westphalia
- Admin. region: Arnsberg
- District: Siegen-Wittgenstein
- Town: Kreuztal

Area
  - Total: 4.36 km^{2} (1.68 sq mi)
- Elevation: 286 m (938 ft)
- Time zone: UTC+01:00 (CET)
  - Summer (DST): UTC+02:00 (CEST)
- Postal codes: 57223
- Dialling codes: 02732
- Vehicle registration: SI
- Website: kreuztal.de/stadtinfo-tourismus-freizeit/stadtinfo/stadtteile/fellinghausen/

Fellinghausen is a constituent community of Kreuztal, Siegen-Wittgenstein, North Rhine-Westphalia, Germany.

It has a population of 2.766 inhabitants.

The village consists of the districts of Fellinghausen, Dornseifen and Weiden.

== History ==
The first mention was made around 1300, a precisely dated document exists from 1344, Dornseifen and Weiden were first mentioned in 1413.

Until 1818 the rural character remained intact, but with industrial development a change to the working class community took place, in which agriculture was only a part-time occupation.

Until the end of 1968 the town belonged to the Amt Ferndorf. On 1 January 1969, Fellinghausen was incorporated into the city of Kreuztal, which was created as part of the communal reorganization.

A special feature in Fellinghausen is the historical Hauberg, which shows the form of traditional forest use in the Siegerland. In the project, the Forest Cooperative has undertaken to continue an area of about 24 hectares from its forest ownership in the old form of forest management (historical use of the Hauberg) in order to make a contribution to the preservation of tradition. Regular guided tours for school classes, clubs or private groups are conducted under the direction of the Waldgenossenschaft Fellinghausen in cooperation with the Forstamt Hilchenbach.

In addition, there are eleven local clubs in Fellinghausen, including the TuS Fellinghausen 1920 e. V. and the Kyffhäuser Kameradschaft Fellinghausen e. V.
