= Hauberg =

Type of communal forest management

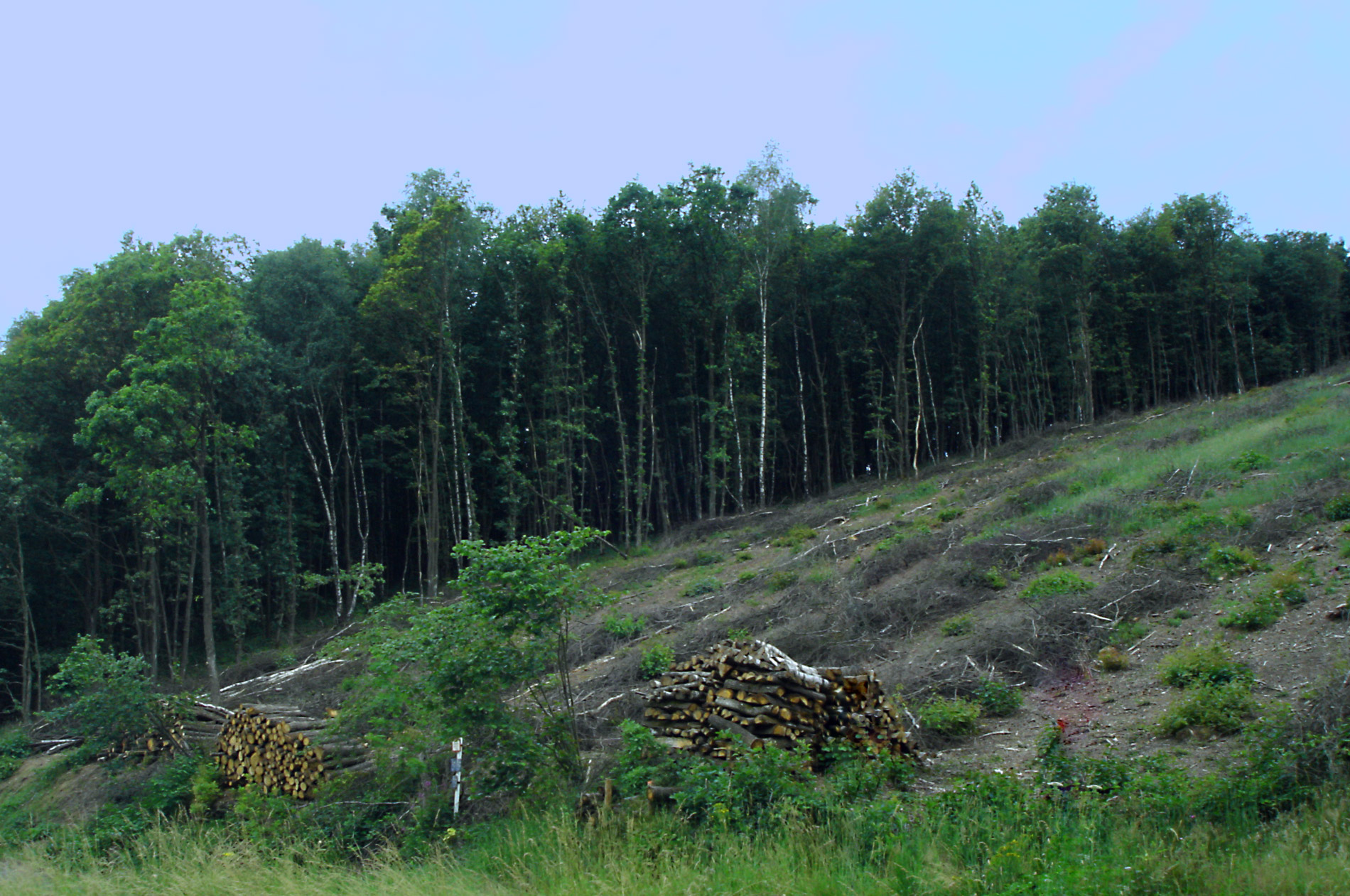
The Hauberg near Netphen

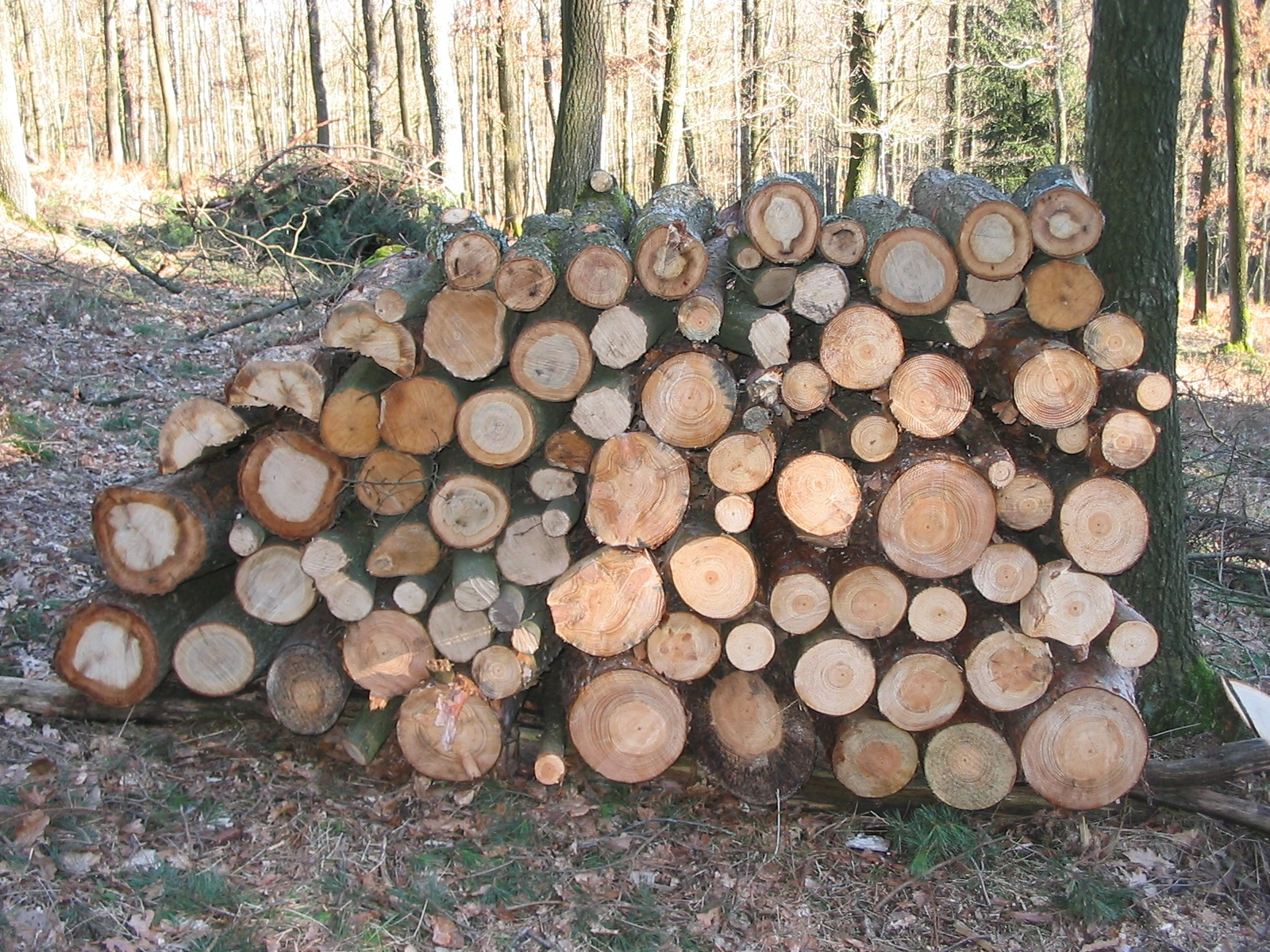
Woodpile near Salchendorf

Hauberg is a type of communal forest management that is typical of the Siegerland and adjacent parts of the Lahn-Dill Uplands and the Westerwald in central Germany. Its aim is to manage the forest in order to produce tanbark and charcoal for the regionally important iron ore industry as well as firewood. In addition to forestry uses, the area also has agricultural uses, such as the growing of rye and buckwheat, typical of shifting cultivation, in the year after the timber harvest, as well as subsequent communal grazing (commons).

== Overview ==
The Hauberg is an oak-birch coppiced woodland, in which other trees are occasionally scattered. With a cycle of from 16 to 20 years the Hauberg undergoes clearcutting or coppicing, leaving the stumps in the ground to begin growing again. Only in the year after clearfelling is the land used for grain. In years when there is a lot of mast, pigs are kept in the Hauberg.

With the decline in demand for tanbark and charcoal this form of management has lost its significance. In the second half of the 20th century large areas were turned over to high forest management. The remaining low forest stands are almost exclusively devoted to the production of firewood and industrial wood.

== See also ==
- Haubarg or Hauberg, a typical farmhouse type on the Eiderstedt peninsula

== Literature ==
=== General sources ===
- Becker, Alfred: "Der Siegerländer Hauberg". Vergangenheit, Gegenwart und Zukunft einer Waldwirtschaftsform. verlag die wielandschmiede, Kreuztal, 1991
- Becker, Alfred: Das Haubergs-Lexikon. verlag die wielandschmiede, Kreuztal, 2002
- Hans Hausrath: Geschichte des deutschen Waldbaus. Von seinen Anfängen bis 1850. Schriftenreihe des Instituts für Forstpolitik und Raumordnung der Universität Freiburg. Hochschulverlag, Freiburg im Breisgau, 1982, ISBN 3-8107-6803-0
- Richard B. Hilf: Der Wald. Wald und Weidwerk in Geschichte und Gegenwart - Erster Teil [Reprint]. Aula, Wiebelsheim, 2003, ISBN 3-494-01331-4
- Josef Lorsbach: "Hauberge und Hauberggenossenschaften des Siegerlandes". Band X Quellen und Studien des Instituts für Genossenschaftswesen an der Universität Münster. Verlag C.F. Müller, Karlsruhe, 1956. (Dissertation 1953)

=== Specific sources ===
- Konrad Fuchs: Geschichte der Verbandsgemeinde Gebhardshain 1815-1970., Mainz, 1982, ISBN 3-87439-082-9
- Rolf Lerner: Haubergsgenossenschaften im Kreis Altenkirchen., Verlag Mühlsteyn, Elben-Weiselstein 1993
- Manfred Kohl: Die Dynamik der Kulturlandschaft im oberen Lahn-Dillkreis - Wandlungen von Haubergswirtschaft und Ackerbau zu neuen Formen der Landnutzung in der modernen Regionalentwicklung. Gießener Geographische Schriften, Heft 45. 176 pp.(and map material), Gießen, 1978
- Alfred Becker (Red.): Bilder aus dem Hauberg. Naturschutz außerhalb von Schutzgebieten. Schriftenreihe der Landesforstverwaltung Nordrhein-Westfalen, Heft 1. 3., unveränderte Auflage. Forstliche Dokumentationsstelle der Landesforstverwaltung NRW, Arnsberg 2003, 48 pp., ISBN 3-9809057-5-6
- Frank Schüssler: Die Haubergswirtschaft: Potenziale und Risiken eines traditionellen forstlichen Betriebssystems. In: Geographische Rundschau 01/2008.

=== Control aspects ===
- Suchanek in Herrmann/Heuer/Raupach, Kommentar zur EStG und KStG, § 3 KStG, Anmerkung 35ff.
