= Markwald =

A Markwald is an area of woodland that is jointly managed by several villages or towns. It is an historic term that is used in German-speaking Europe and roughly means "common forest."

The woods in a Markwald do not therefore belong to the territory (Gemarkung) of the individual villages, but were part of a joint territory, run by a co-operative, the so-called Markgenossenschaft. Even when a Markgenossenschaft is dissolved, the term Markwald often continues to be used today as the name of the woodland.

Inhabitants of the surrounding municipalities, so long as they are part of the Markgenossenschaft, have the right to fell timber in the Markwald, to leave their cattle to graze in the forest (e.g. droving or pannage) and so on. Hunting rights were not included however. Members of the Markgenossenschaft have a percentage share in the woods, but no specific claim to ownership. They have the right of co-determination and the type of management to be carried out, is jointly agreed, on the advice of the forester responsible, at their annual general meetings. They can, for example, decide if and where plantations are established and whether wind generators may be built within the forest area. They also benefit for example if the income from timber sales or hunting licences exceeds the expenditure.

== Other meanings ==
- Markwald is also e.g. a quarter in the town of Mühlheim am Main.
- Markwald is a male, Germanic personal name and a surname.

== Literature ==
- Stinglwagner, Gerhard; Haseder, Ilse; Erlbeck, Reinhold (2016). Das Kosmos Wald- und Forstlexikon (in German) (5th ed.). Stuttgart: Franckh-Kosmos Verlags-Gmbh & Co. ISBN 978-3-440-15524-0. OCLC 960018165.
