= Darmstadt =

City in Hesse, Germany

- City
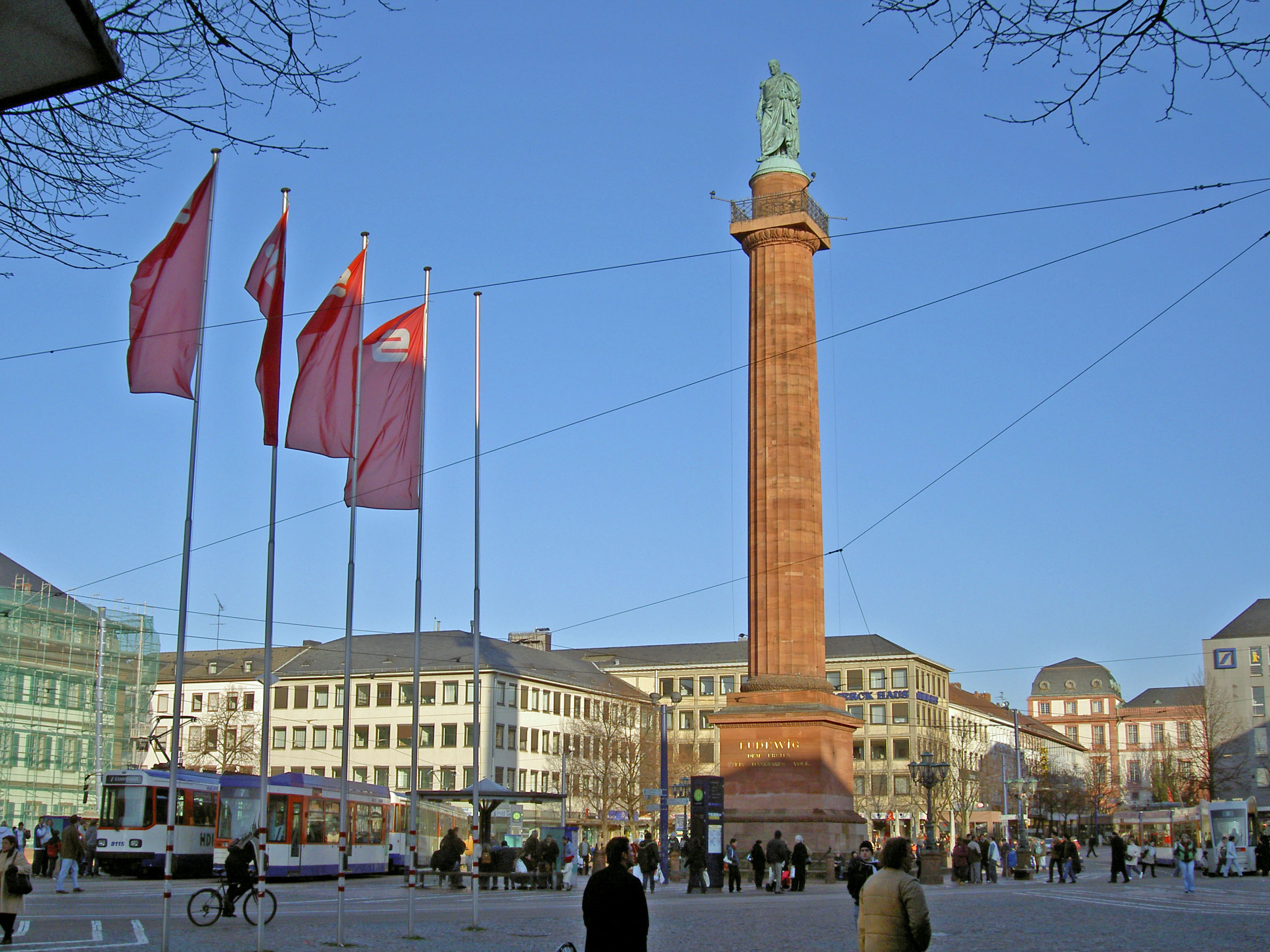
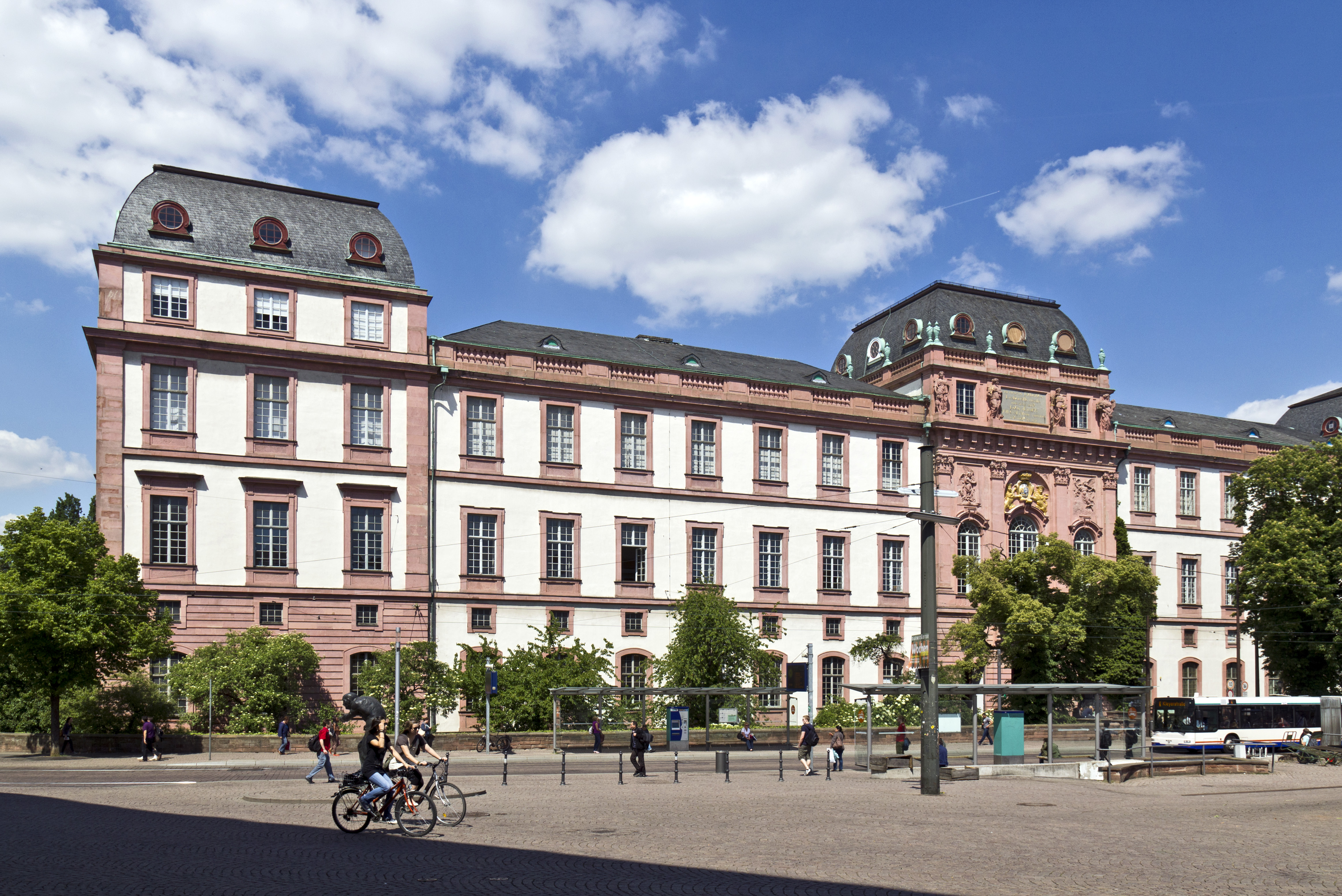
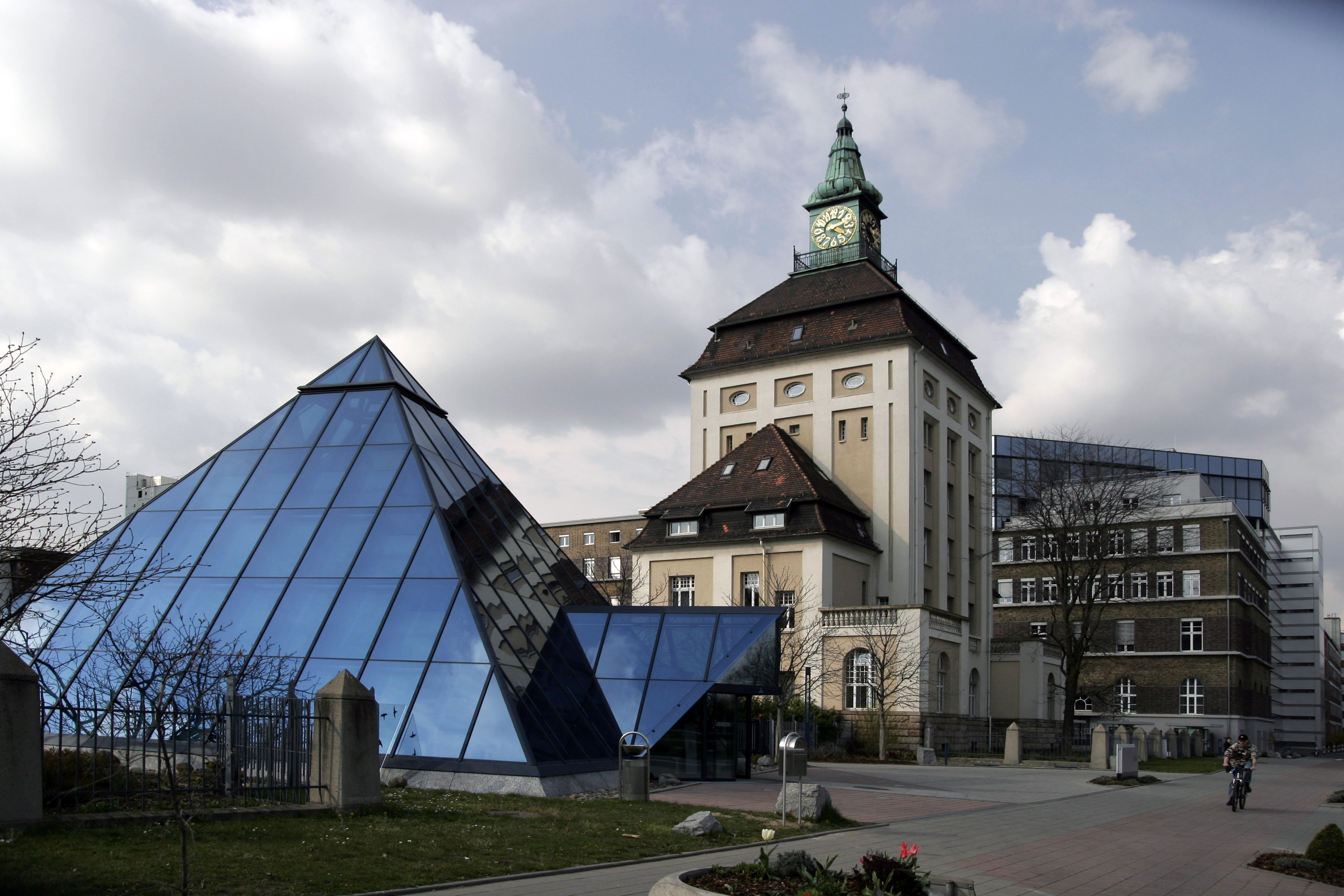
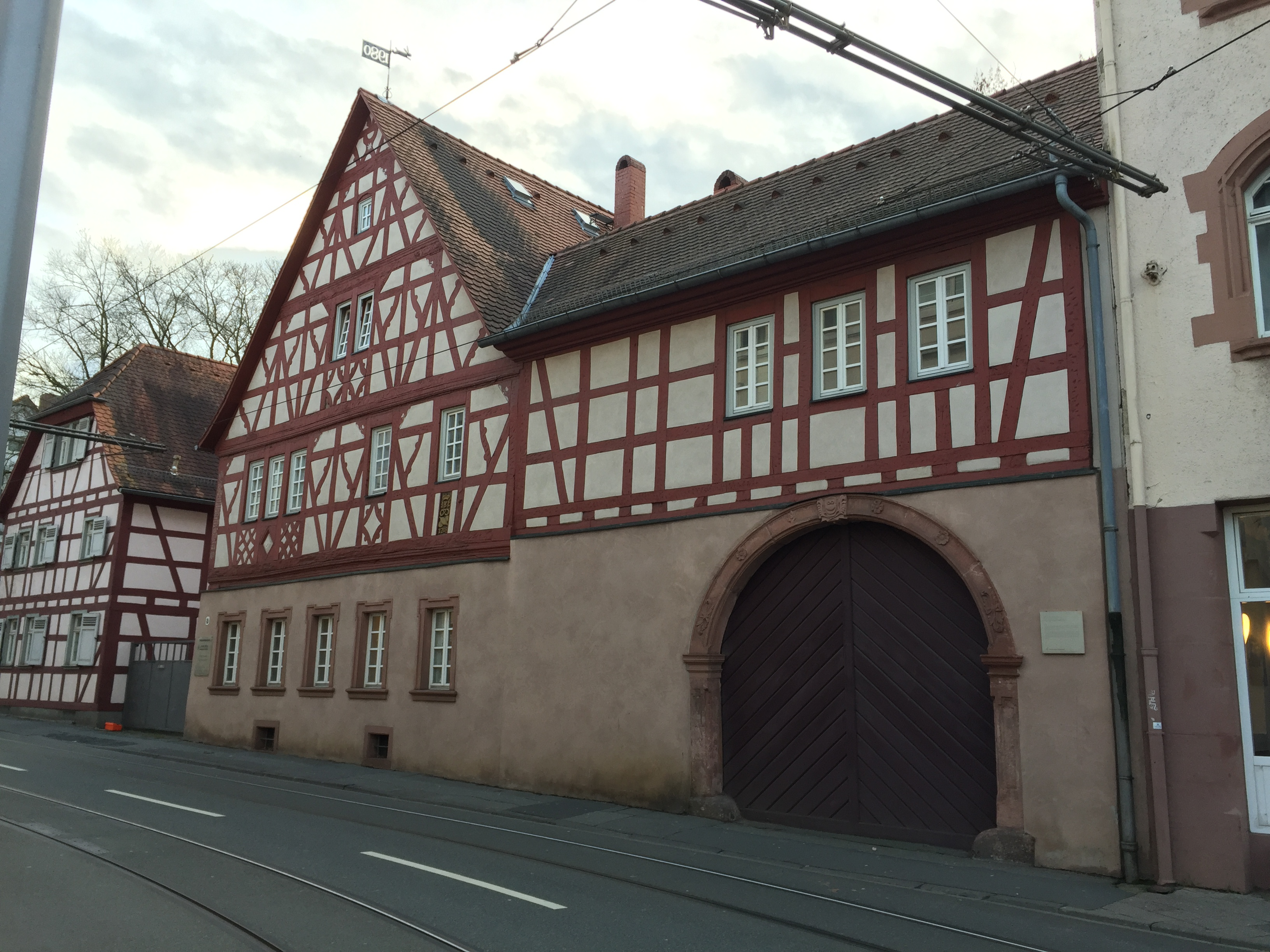
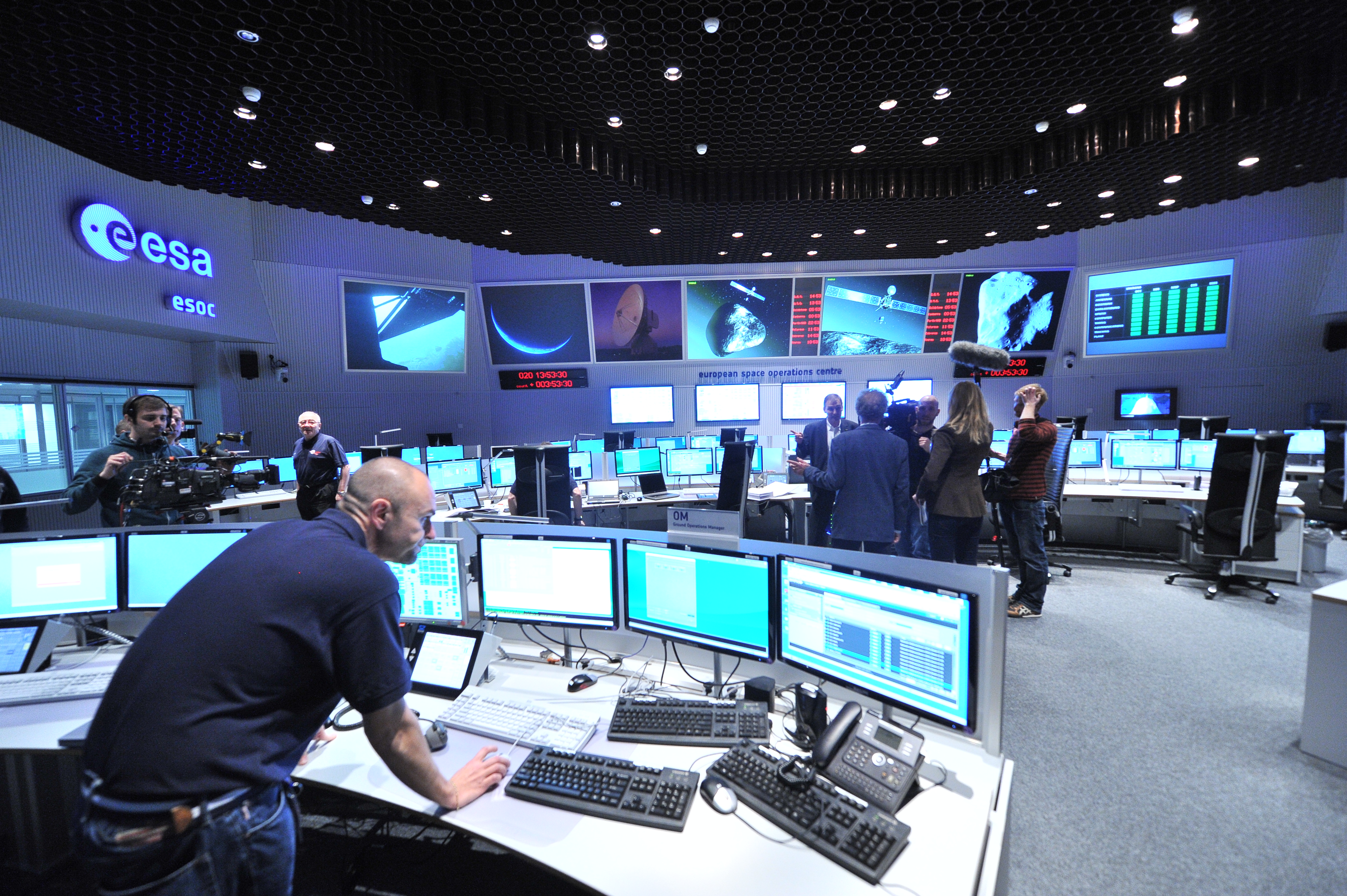
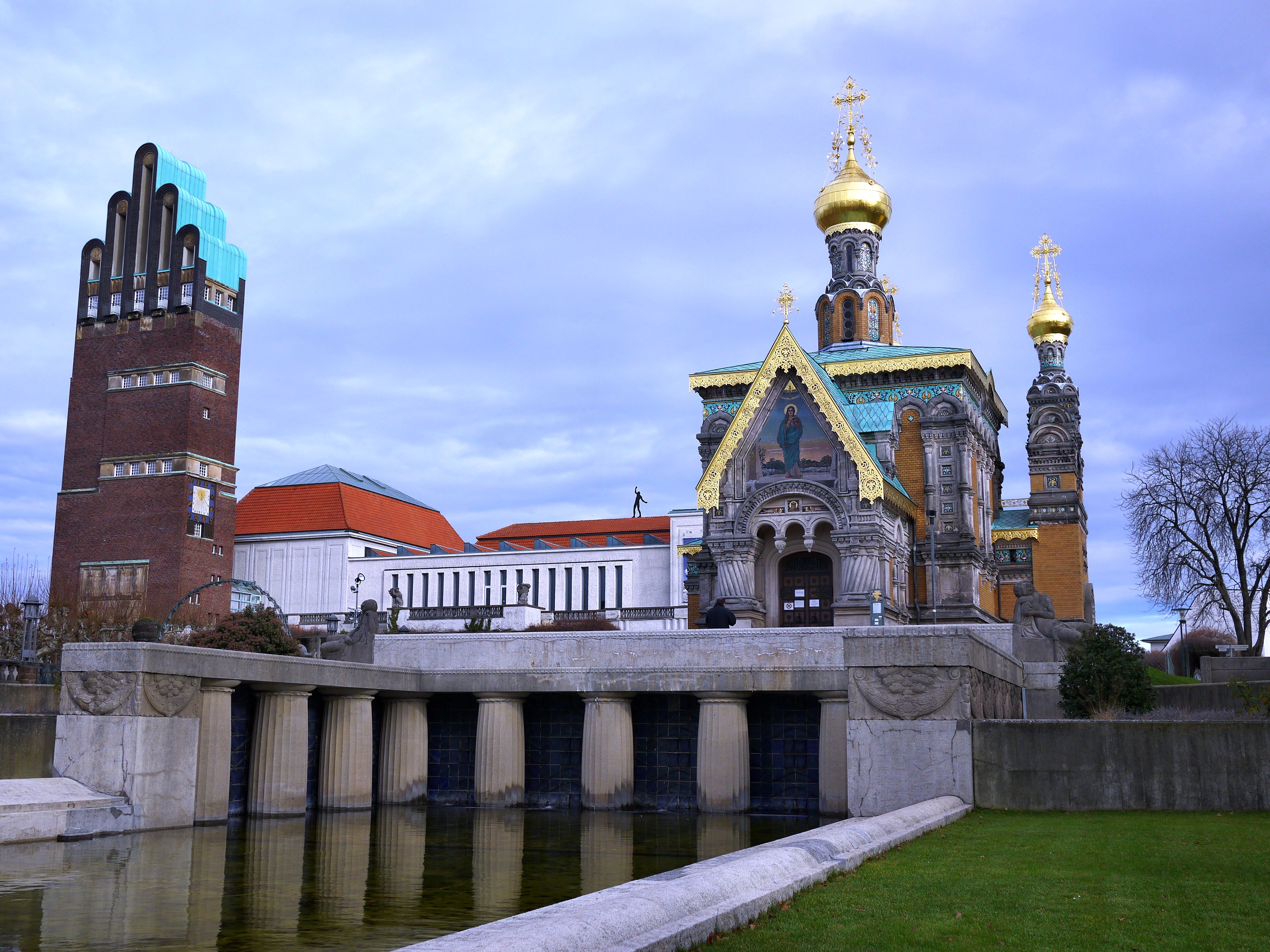
- Central Darmstadt in January 2005 Residential Palace Headquarters of Merck Group Bessungen old town European Space Operations Centre UNESCO World Heritage Site Artists' Colony

- Flag Coat of arms

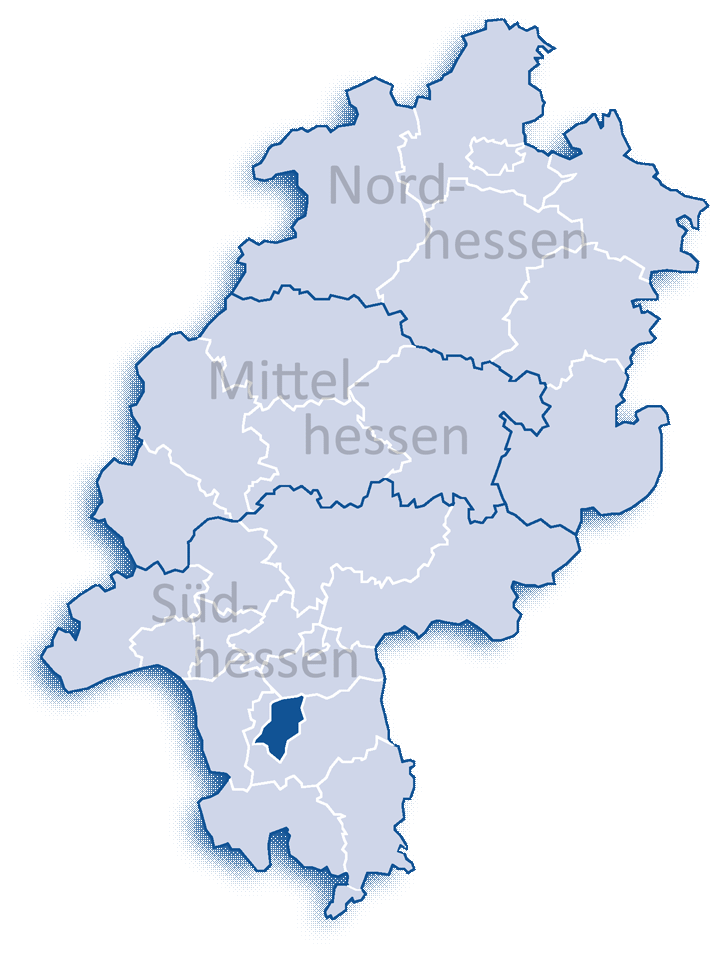
- Location of Darmstadt within Hessen
- Interactive map of Darmstadt
- Location within Germany Location within Hesse
- Coordinates: 49°52′20″N 8°39′10″E
- Country: Germany
- State: Hesse
- Admin. region: Darmstadt
- District: Urban district
- Subdivisions: 9 boroughs

Government
  - Mayor (2023–29): Hanno Benz (SPD)

Area
  - Total: 122.23 km^{2} (47.19 sq mi)
- Elevation: 144 m (472 ft)

Population (2025-12-31)
  - Total: 168,253
  - Density: 1,376.5/km^{2} (3,565.2/sq mi)
- Time zone: UTC+01:00 (CET)
  - Summer (DST): UTC+02:00 (CEST)
- Postal codes: 64283–64297
- Dialling codes: 06151, 06150
- Vehicle registration: DA
- Website: darmstadt.de

UNESCO World Heritage Site
- Official name: Mathildenhöhe Darmstadt
- Type: Cultural
- Criteria: (ii)(iv)
- Designated: 2021
- Reference no.

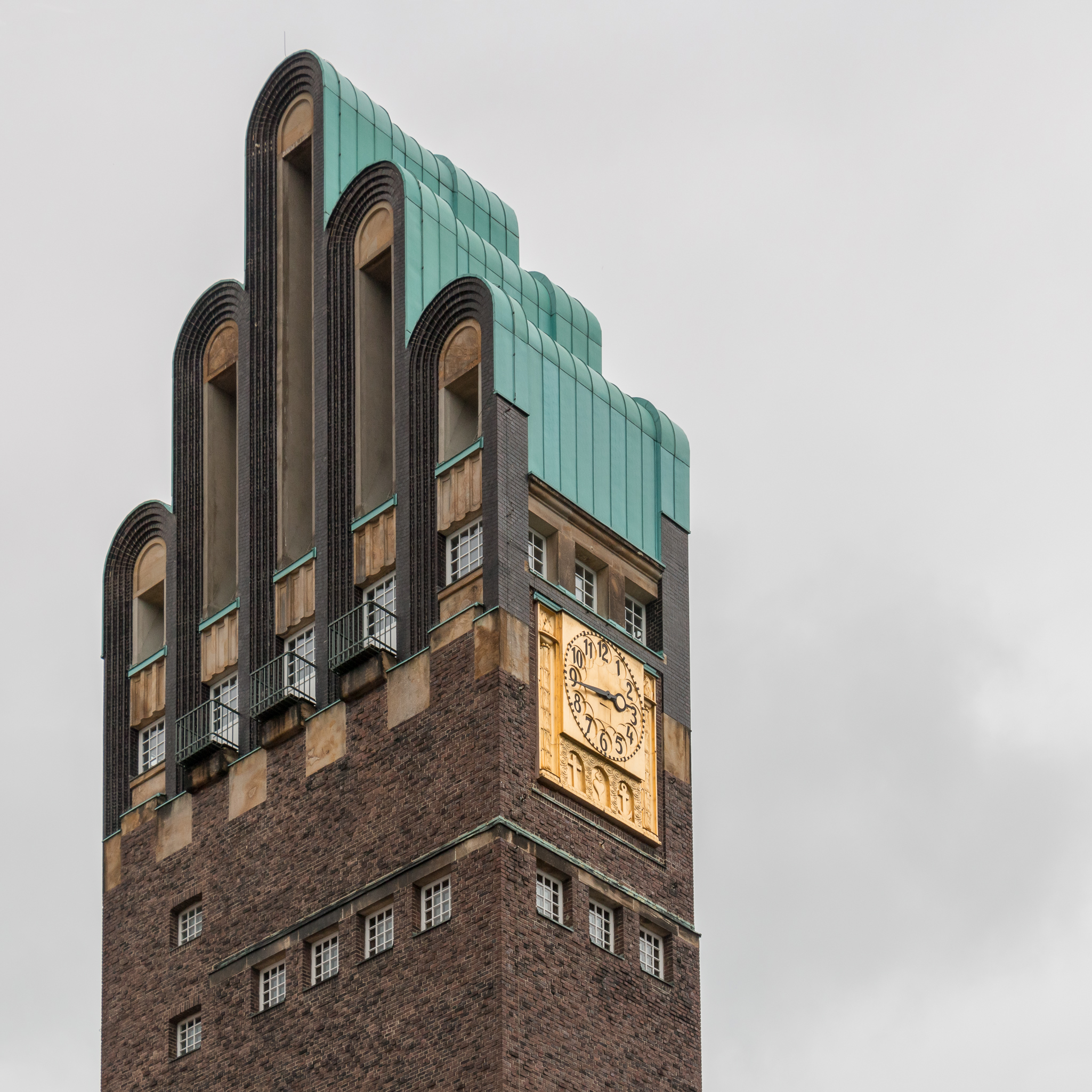
Landmark of Darmstadt: Hochzeitsturm ("Wedding Tower"), built in 1908 in Jugendstil architecture at Mathildenhöhe

Darmstadt (/ˈdɑːrmstæt/ DARM-stat, UK also /-ʃtæt/ -shtat, US also /-stɑːt, -ʃtɑːt/ -s(h)taht; German: [ˈdaʁmʃtat]) is a city in the state of Hesse in Germany, located in the southern part of the Rhine-Main-Area (Frankfurt Metropolitan Region). Darmstadt has around 160,000 inhabitants, making it the fourth largest city in the state of Hesse after Frankfurt am Main, Wiesbaden, and Kassel.

Darmstadt holds the official title "City of Science" (German: Wissenschaftsstadt) as it is a major centre of scientific institutions, universities, and high-technology companies. The European Organisation for the Exploitation of Meteorological Satellites (EUMETSAT) and the European Space Agency's European Space Operations Centre (ESA ESOC) are located in Darmstadt, as well as GSI Centre for Heavy Ion Research, where several chemical elements such as darmstadtium, roentgenium, and copernicium were discovered. The existence of several elements was also confirmed at the GSI Centre. The Facility for Antiproton and Ion Research (FAIR) is an international accelerator facility under construction. Darmstadt is also the seat of the world's oldest pharmaceutical company, Merck, which is the city's largest employer.

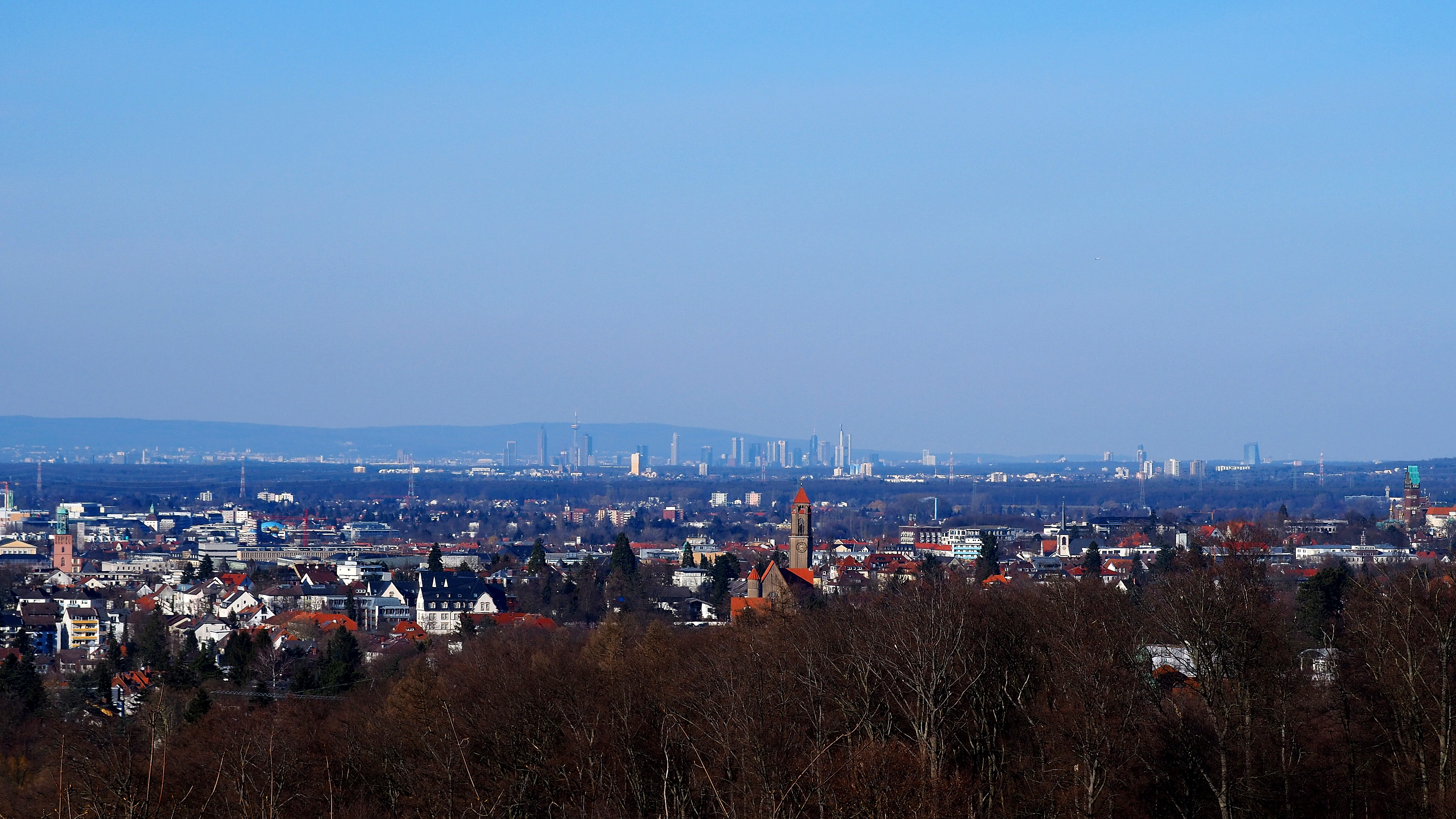
View across Darmstadt towards the Frankfurt skyline

The Mathildenhöhe, including the Darmstadt artists' colony, a major centre of the Jugendstil artistic movement, referring both to the group of artists active in the city in the late 19th and early 20th century, as well as the buildings which they designed, together with the Russian Chapel in Darmstadt, were recognized as a World Heritage Site by UNESCO in 2021.

Darmstadt was formerly the capital of a sovereign state, the Grand Duchy of Hesse and its successor, the People's State of Hesse, a federal state of Germany. As the capital of an increasingly prosperous duchy, the city gained some international prominence and remains one of the wealthiest cities in Europe. In the 20th century, industry (especially chemicals), as well as large science and electronics (and later, information technology) sectors became increasingly important, and are still a major part of the city's economy. It is also home to the football club SV Darmstadt 98. Alexandra Feodorovna (Alix of Hesse), the wife of Nicholas II of Russia, as well as Maria Alexandrovna (Marie of Hesse), the wife of Alexander II of Russia, who were related, were born in this city.

== History ==
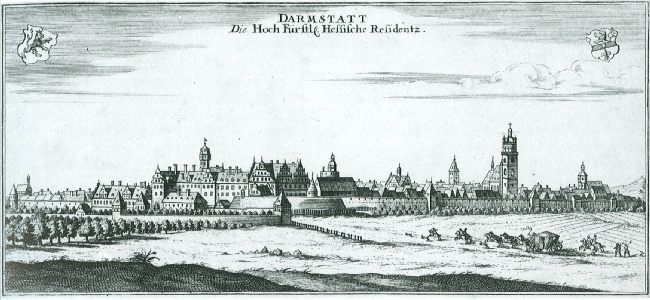
Darmstadt in 1626

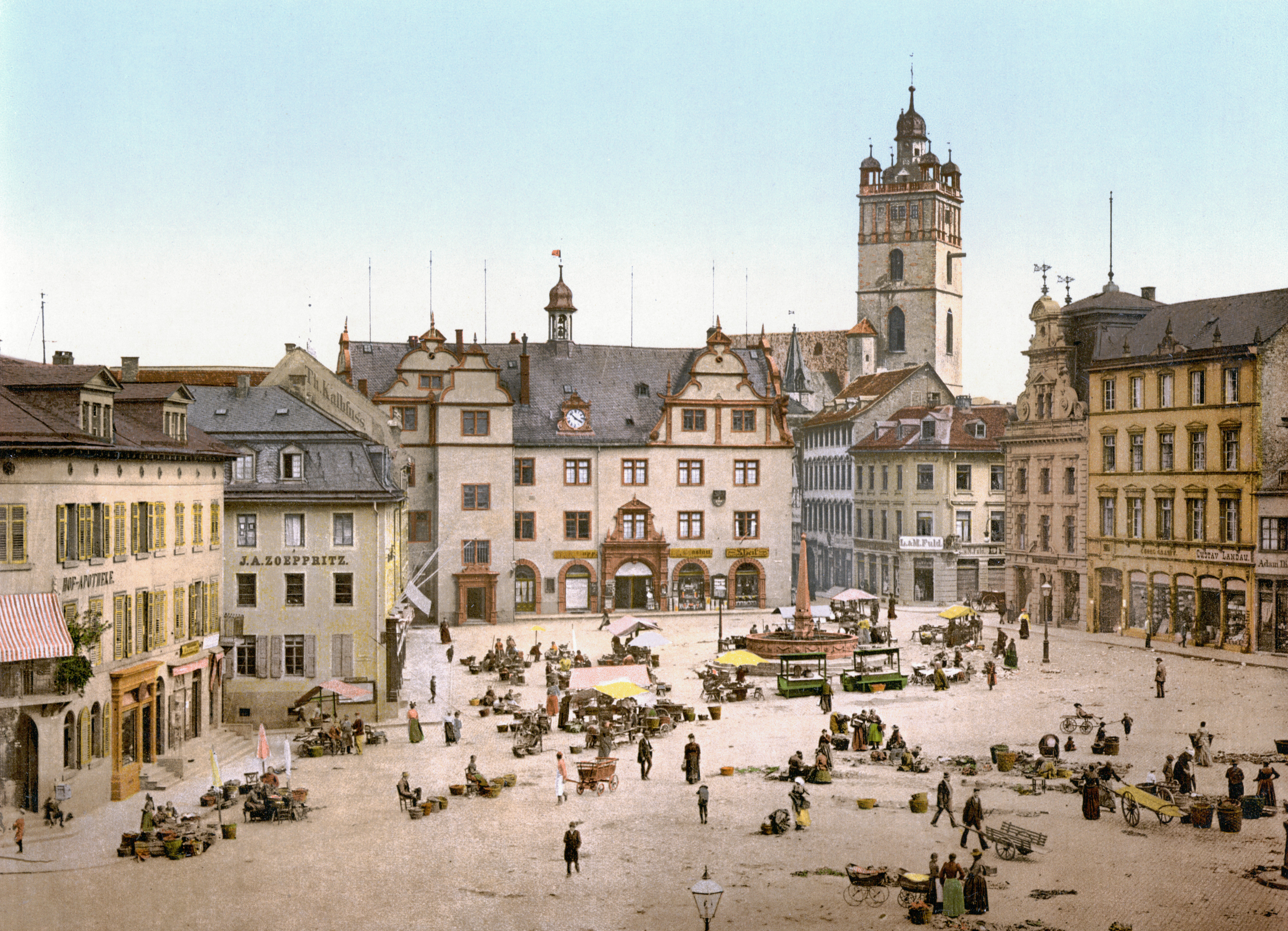
The 'Schlossplatz', a market square in front of the Ducal Palace around 1900: one of the few areas to survive in similar style after World War II

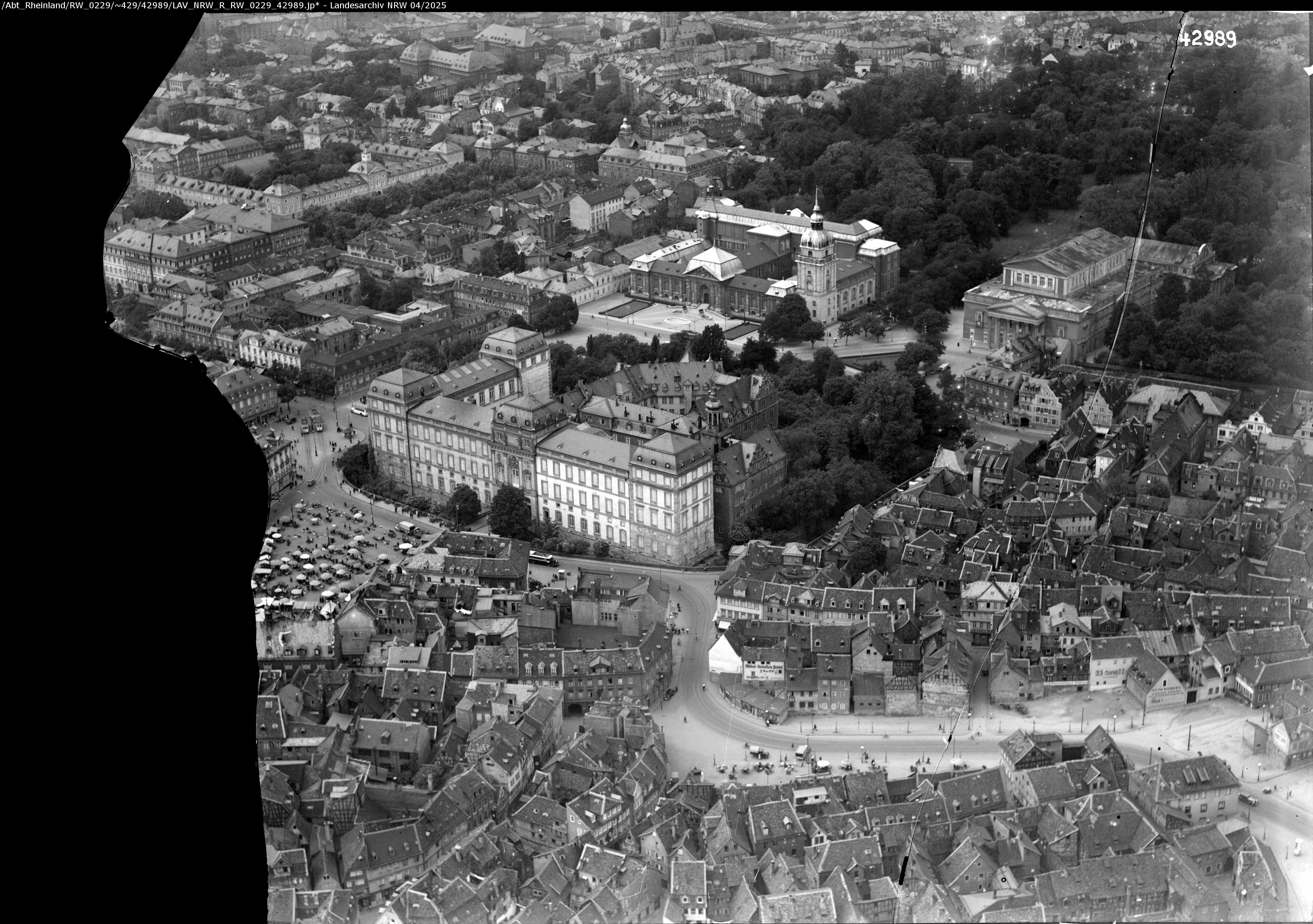
The Old Town of Darmstadt with the Ducal Palace, 1936

=== Origins ===
The name Darmstadt first appears towards the end of the 11th century, then as Darmundestat.

Darmstadt was chartered as a city by the Holy Roman Emperor Ludwig the Bavarian in 1330, at which time it belonged to the counts of Katzenelnbogen. The city, then called Darmstait, became a secondary residence for the counts, with a small castle established at the site of the current, much larger edifice.

When the house of Katzenelnbogen became extinct in 1479, the city was passed to the Landgraviate of Hesse, and was seat of the ruling landgraves (1567–1806) and thereafter (to 1918) of the grand dukes of Hesse.

=== Industrial age ===
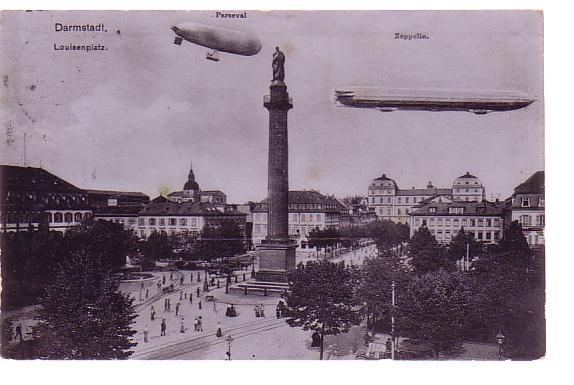
Darmstadt in 1909

The city's population grew during the 19th century, from a little over 10,000, to 72,000 inhabitants. A polytechnical school, which later became a Technical University now known as TU Darmstadt, was established in 1877.

In the early 20th century, Darmstadt was an important centre for the art movement of Jugendstil, the German variant of Art Nouveau. Also during this period, in 1912 the chemist Anton Kollisch, working for the pharmaceutical company Merck, first synthesised the chemical MDMA (ecstasy) in Darmstadt. Darmstadt's municipal area was extended in 1937 to include the neighbouring localities of Arheilgen and Eberstadt, and in 1938 the city was separated administratively from the surrounding district (Kreis).

=== Nazi Germany ===
Darmstadt was the first city in Germany to force Jewish shops to close in early 1933, shortly after the Nazis took power in Germany. The shops were only closed for one day, for "endangering communal order and tranquility". In 1942, over 3,000 Jews from Darmstadt were first forced into a collection camp located in the Liebigschule, and later deported to concentration camps where most eventually died. In 1944, the city was also the location of a subcamp of the Natzweiler-Struthof concentration camp.

Several prominent members of the German resistance movement against the Nazis were citizens of Darmstadt, including Wilhelm Leuschner and Theodor Haubach, both executed for their opposition to Hitler's regime.

Darmstadt was first bombed on 30 July 1940, and 34 other air raids would follow before the war's end. The old city centre was largely destroyed in a British bombing raid on 11/12 September 1944. This attack was an example of "area bombing" using high explosive and incendiary bombs, which combined in that attack to create a firestorm, a self-sustaining combustion process in which winds generated by the fire ensure it continues to burn until everything possible has been consumed. During this attack, an estimated 11,000 to 12,500 of the inhabitants were killed, and 66,000 to 70,000 were left homeless. Over three-quarters of Darmstadt's inner city was destroyed. Post-war rebuilding was done in a relatively plain architectural style, although a number of the historic buildings were rebuilt to their original appearance following the city's capture on 25 March 1945 by the American 4th Armored Division. Today around 30% of Darmstadt consists of buildings from before World War II.

=== Post–World War II ===
Throughout the 19th and 20th centuries, Darmstadt became home to many technology companies and research institutes, and has been promoting itself as a "city of science" since 1997. It is well known as a high-tech centre in the vicinity of Frankfurt Airport, with important activities in spacecraft operations (the European Space Agency's European Space Operations Centre, European Organisation for the Exploitation of Meteorological Satellites), chemistry, pharmacy, information technology, biotechnology, telecommunications (substantial Deutsche Telekom presence) and mechatronics. In 2000, its region also scored Rank 3 amongst 97 German regions in the WirtschaftsWoche test ranking Germany's high-tech regions.

The roots of Darmstadt University of Applied Sciences goes back to 1876 along with Technische Universität Darmstadt (the first electrical engineering chair and inventions fame), when both these Universities were an integrated entities, a need for a separate industry based research educational institution was felt in the early 1930s, finally University of Applied sciences emerged as a separate industry based research educational institution in 1971 and is the largest University of Applied Sciences in Hesse (German: Hessen) with about 16,500 students.

The TU Darmstadt is one of the important technical institutes in Germany and is well known for its research and teaching in the Electrical, Mechanical, Material and Civil Engineering disciplines. Together with other tertiary institutions, the TU is responsible for the large student population of the city, which stood at 33,547 in 2004.

== Boroughs ==
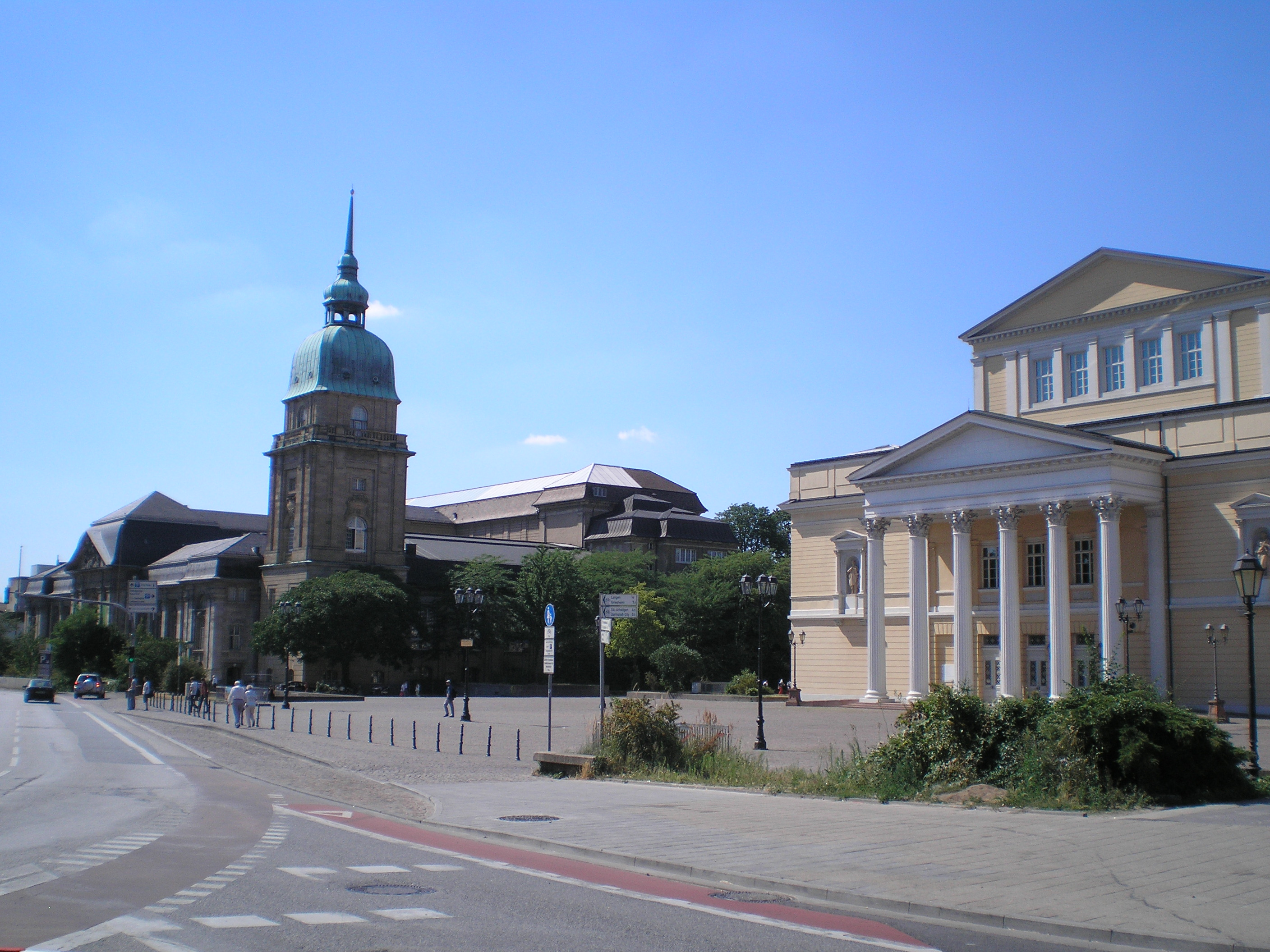
Karolinenplatz

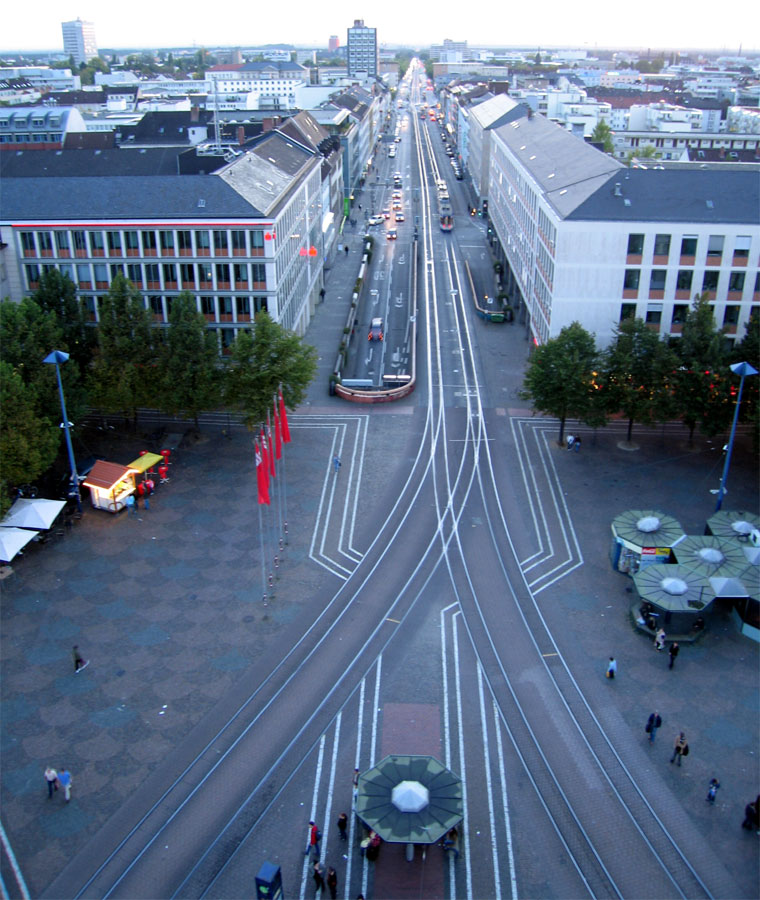
Rheinstrasse in central Darmstadt

Darmstadt has nine official 'Stadtteile' (boroughs). These are:

- Darmstadt-Arheilgen
- Darmstadt-Bessungen
- Darmstadt-Eberstadt
- Darmstadt-Kranichstein
- Darmstadt-Mitte ("Central Darmstadt")
- Darmstadt-Nord ("North")
- Darmstadt-Ost ("East")
- Darmstadt-West
- Darmstadt-Wixhausen

== Population development ==
Historical population
Year	Pop.	±%
1871	33,800	—
1890	55,883	+65.3%
1900	72,381	+29.5%
1925	89,465	+23.6%
1933	93,222	+4.2%
1945	69,539	−25.4%
1956	123,306	+77.3%
1975	137,018	+11.1%
1990	138,920	+1.4%
2000	138,242	−0.5%
2010	144,402	+4.5%
2020	159,174	+10.2%

Rank	Nationality	Population (31 December 2022)
1	Turkey	4,308
2	Italy	2,422
3	Poland	1,836
4	Syria	1,784
5	Ukraine	1,715
6	China	1,673
7	Spain	1,322
8	Morocco	1,138
9	India	1,078
10	Romania	1,034

== Politics ==
=== Mayor ===
The current mayor of Darmstadt is Hanno Benz of SPD, who was elected in 2023.

The following is a list of mayors since 1945:

Term of office	Name	Party
1945–1950	Ludwig Metzger (1902–1993)	SPD
1951–1971	Ludwig Engel (1906–1975)	SPD
1971–1981	Heinz Winfried Sabais (1922–1981)	SPD
1981–1993	Günther Metzger (1933–2013)	SPD
1993–2005	Peter Benz (born 1942)	SPD
2005–2011	Walter Hoffmann (born 1952)	SPD
2011–2023	Jochen Partsch (born 1962)	Greens
2023–present	Hanno Benz	SPD

=== City council ===
Left: 5 seats PARTEI: 2 seats UFFBASSE: 5 seats SPD: 12 seats Greens: 20 seats Volt: 5 seats UWiGA: 2 seats WGD: 1 seat FW: 1 seat FDP: 4 seats CDU: 11 seats AfD: 3 seats

The Darmstadt city council (Stadtverordnetenversammlung) governs the city alongside the Mayor. The most recent city council election was held on 14 March 2021, and the results were as follows:

Party	Lead candidate	Votes	%	+/-	Seats	+/-
Alliance 90/The Greens (Grüne)	Hildegard Förster-Heldmann	1,151,498	27.4	▼2.3	20	▼1
Social Democratic Party (SPD)	Tim Huß	703,686	16.7	▼0.5	12	±0
Christian Democratic Union (CDU)	Paul Georg Wandrey	654,797	15.6	▼2.6	11	▼2
The Left (Die Linke)	Karl-Heinz Böck	310,074	7.4	▲0.6	5	±0
Volt Germany (Volt)	Nicolas Kämmerer	289,023	6.9	New	5	New
UFFBASSE	Kerstin Lau	269,301	6.4	▼1.3	5	±0
Free Democratic Party (FDP)	Leif Blum	234,121	5.6	▲0.3	4	±0
Alternative for Germany (AfD)	Günter Zabel	191,982	4.6	▼4.6	3	▼4
UWiGA	Erich Bauer	130,867	3.1	▼0.6	2	▼1
Die PARTEI (PARTEI)	Holger Eisenblätter	90,254	2.1	▲1.8	2	▲2
Voters' Association of Darmstadt (WGD)	Falk Neumann	85,320	2.0	New	1	New
Free Voters (FW)	Harald Uhl	79,293	1.9	New	1	New
Take Part in Darmstadt	Dorothea Mondry	13,680	0.3	New	0	New
Valid votes		60,815	96.6			
Invalid votes		2,141	3.4			
Total		62,956	100.0		71	±0
Electorate/voter turnout		115,119	54.7	▲6.9		
Source: Statistics Hesse Archived 2 August 2021 at the Wayback Machine

== Transport ==
=== Roads ===
Darmstadt is connected to a number of major roads, including two Autobahnen (Bundesautobahn 5 and Bundesautobahn 67). The main road passing west–east is the Bundesstraße 26, the Bundesstraße 3 runs north–south. The rural areas east of the city in the Odenwald are accessed by several secondary roads.

=== National rail links ===
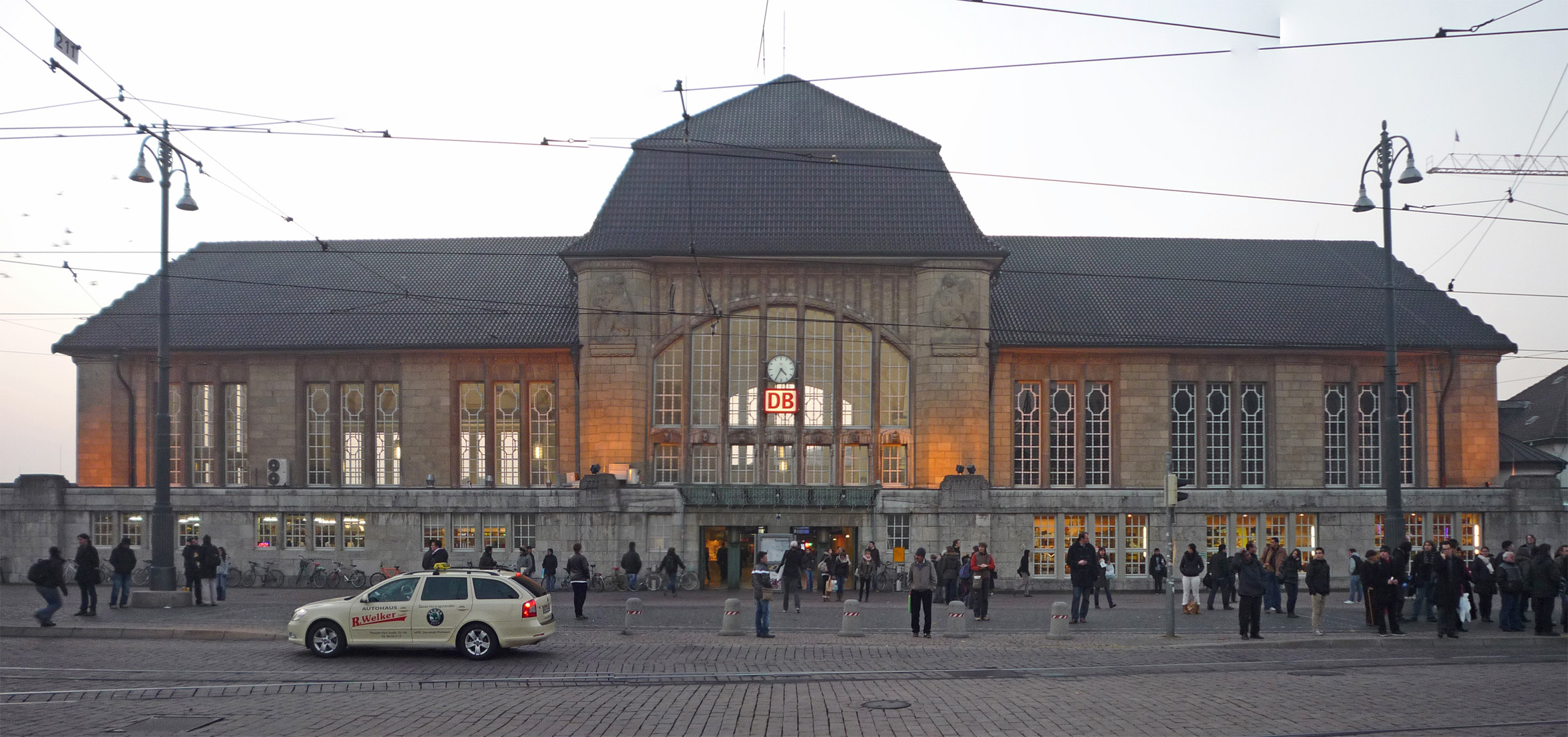
Hauptbahnhof Railway Station

Darmstadt is connected to the rest of Germany and Europe through its main railway station, Darmstadt Hauptbahnhof, which is located in the western part of the city centre. The station is part of the Intercity-Express network and also served by other long-distance trains. It is a busy station with 12 platforms and serves as a transportation hub for the southern Hesse/Odenwald region.

=== Regional rail links ===
Darmstadt Hauptbahnhof is the terminus of on the Rhine-Main S-Bahn, which connects the city to Frankfurt. Within Darmstadt the S6 also stops at stations in Darmstadt-Arheilgen and Darmstadt-Wixhausen. Regional trains also connect six secondary railway stations within Darmstadt, and stations in the surrounding region, with Darmstadt Hauptbahnhof.

=== Public transport in Darmstadt ===
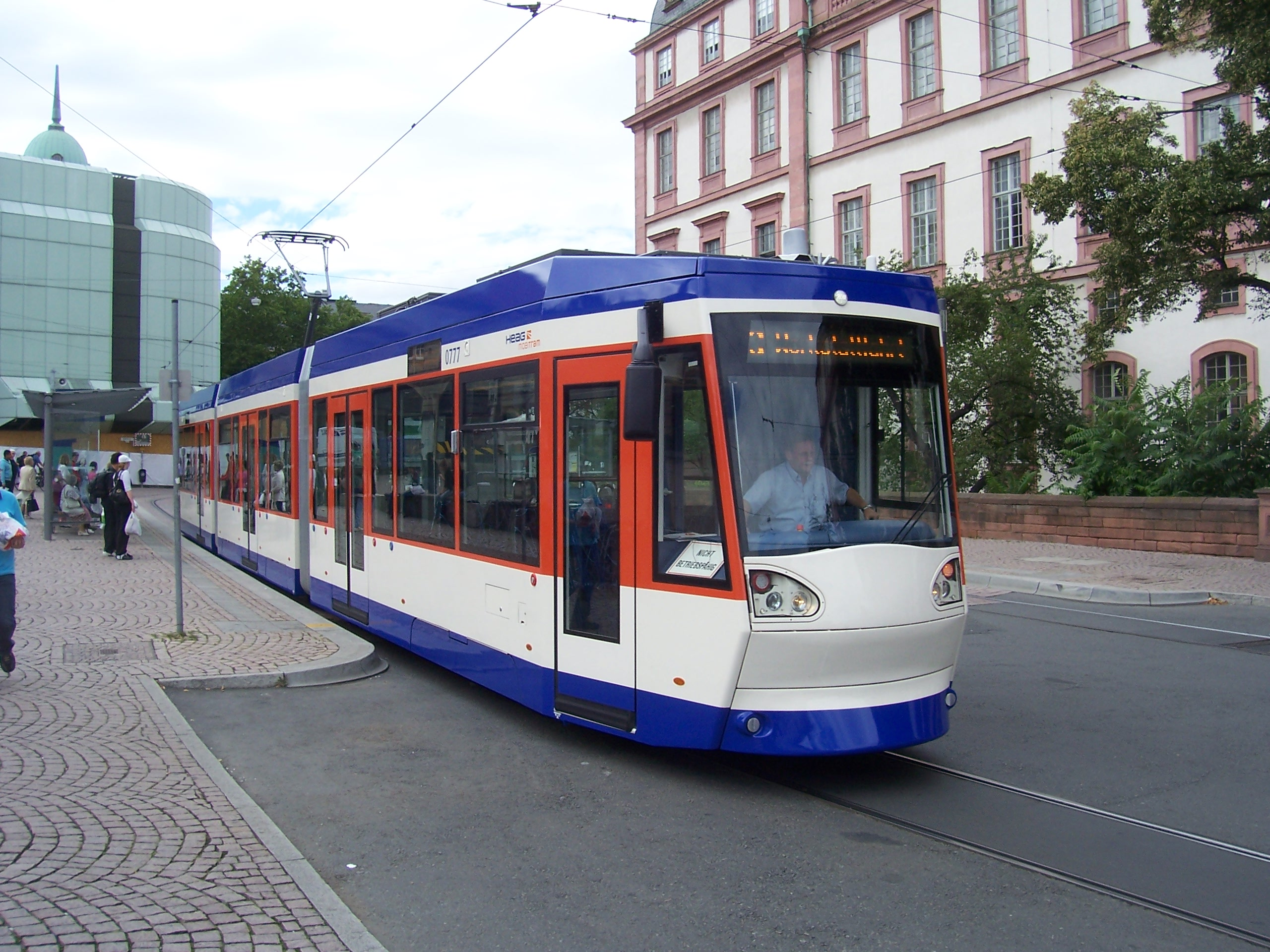
Tram near the Schloss

Rhein-Main-Verkehrsverbund (RMV)

The extensive public transport system of Darmstadt is integrated in the RMV (the transportation authority of the Rhein-Main Metropolitan Area). The backbone of public transport in Darmstadt is the tram system with 10 lines. Local bus lines also serve all parts of the city and the city is served by regional bus lines.

=== Airports ===
The historically important local airfield August Euler Airfield is closed to aviation at large, being reserved for the use of the Technische Universität Darmstadt.

- Frankfurt International Airport

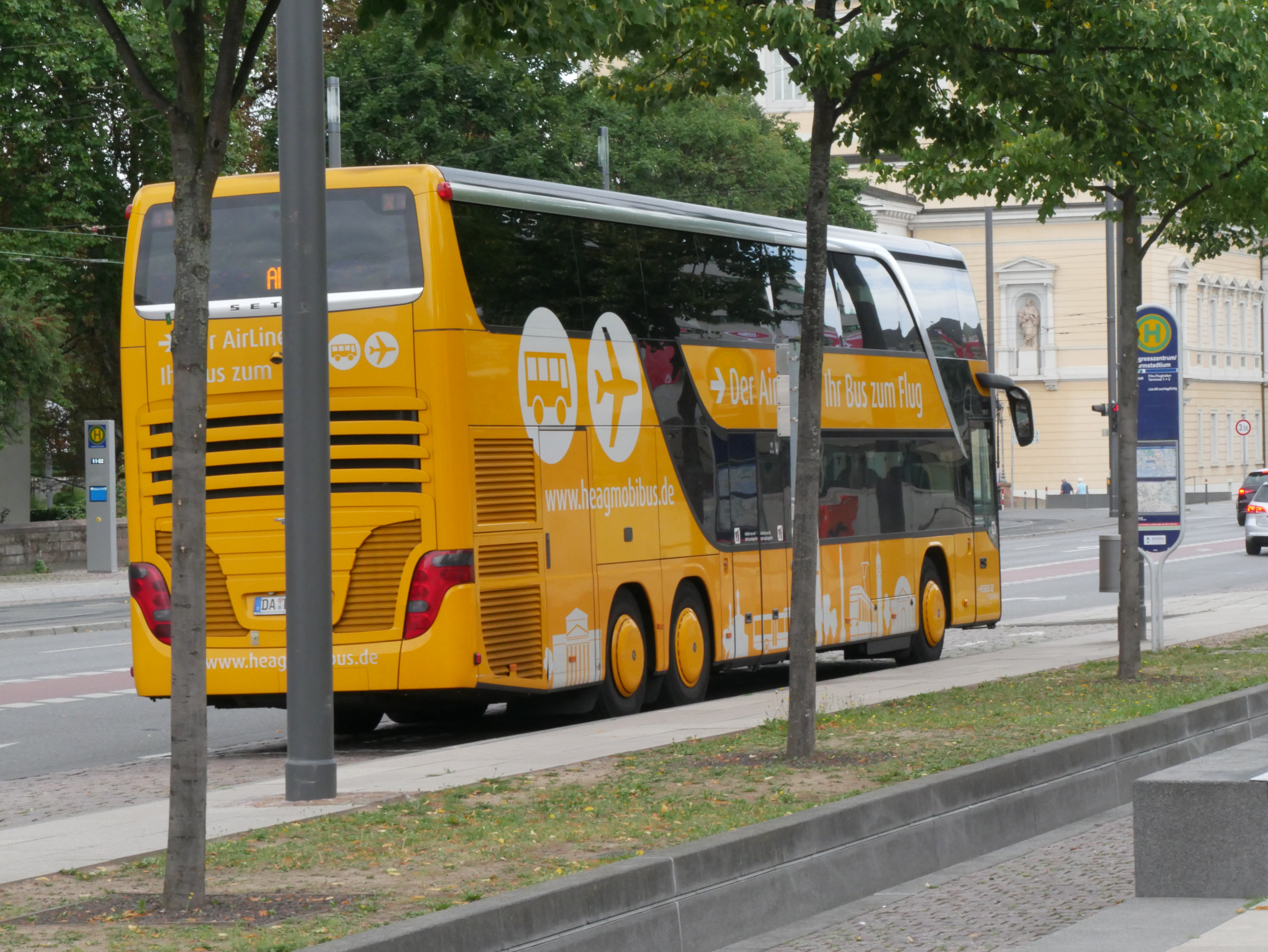
Airliner bus connection Darmstadt to Frankfurt Airport

Darmstadt can be easily accessed from around the world via Frankfurt Airport (Flughafen Frankfurt am Main) which is located 20 km (12 mi) north of central Darmstadt and connected to it via Autobahn 5, S-Bahn, several bus lines and a direct express bus-link ("Airliner"). The airport ranks among the world's busiest airports by passenger traffic and is the second-busiest airport by cargo traffic in Europe. The airport also serves as the main hub for German flag carrier Lufthansa.

- Frankfurt Egelsbach Airport

Frankfurt Egelsbach Airport (Flugplatz Frankfurt-Egelsbach) is a busy general aviation airport located 5 km north of Darmstadt, near the town of Egelsbach.

- Frankfurt Hahn Airport

Despite the name, Frankfurt Hahn Airport (Flughafen Frankfurt-Hahn) is located far outside the Frankfurt Metro Area, approximately 120 km (75 mi) to the west in Lautzenhausen (Rhineland-Palatinate). Hahn Airport is a major base for low-cost carrier Ryanair. This airport can only be reached by car or bus.

=== National coach services ===
Darmstadt is served by several national and European bus links which connect Darmstadt with other German and European cities.

== Parks, architecture, and attractions ==
=== Castles and historical buildings ===
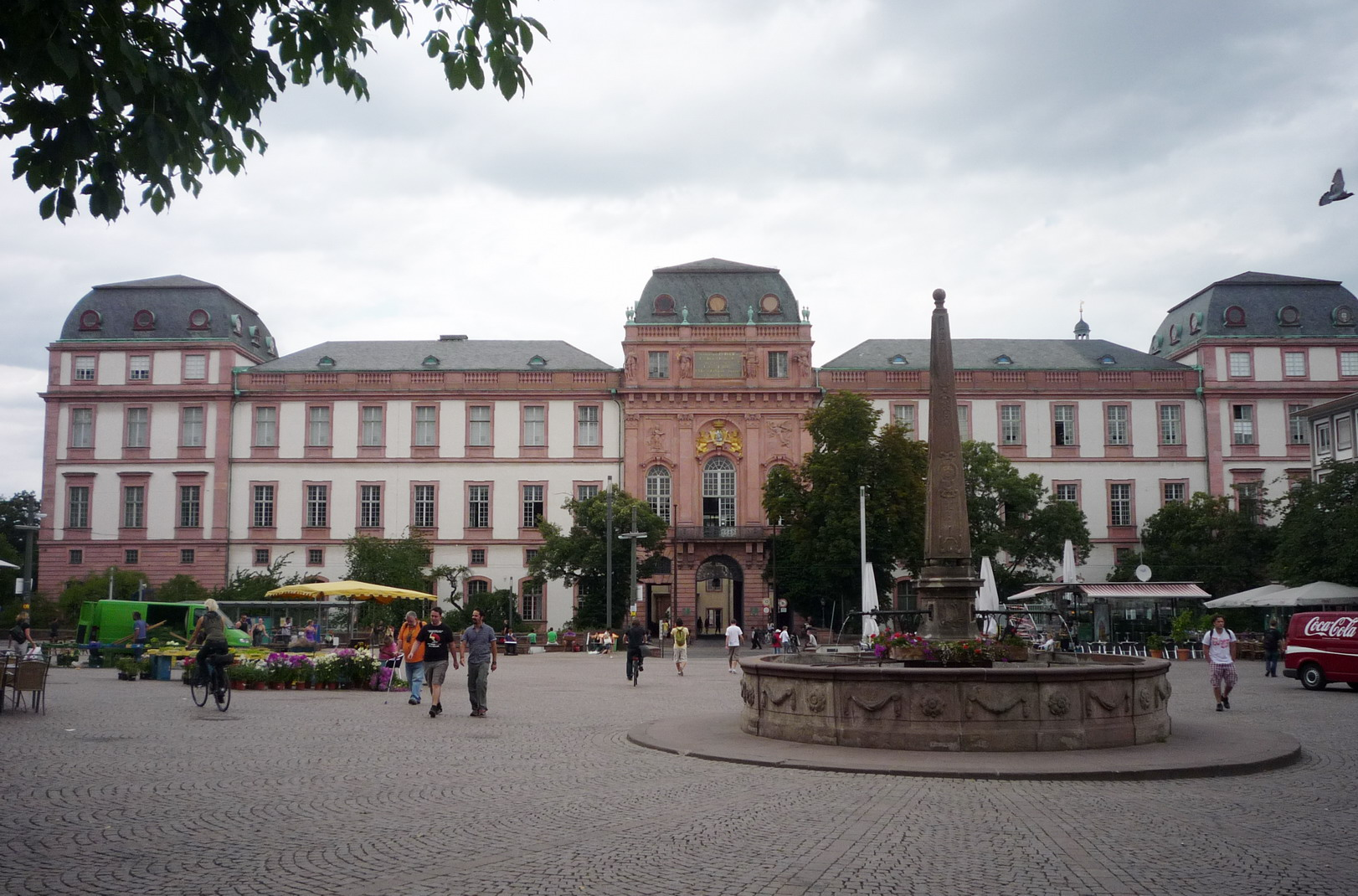
Residential Palace and Market Square

City Centre Darmstadt
City Centre Darmstadt
1 Residential Palace Darmstadt
2 Hessisches Landesmuseum Darmstadt
3 Haus der Geschichte (former court theatre)
4 Audimax TU Darmstadt (largest lecture hall)
5 Kongresszentrum darmstadtium (congress centre)
6 Altes Rathaus (former town hall)
7 Luisenplatz
8 Friedensplatz (peace square)
9 Karolinenplatz
10 Marktplatz (market square)
11 Herrngarten (urban park)

Darmstadt was the capital of an independent country (the Grand Duchy of Hesse) until 1871 and the capital of the German state of Hesse until 1945. It is due to its past as a capital city that it has many architectural testimonies of this period. Many of its major architectural landmarks were created by Georg Moller who was appointed the court master builder of the Grand Duchy of Hesse.

The Residential Palace Darmstadt (Stadtschloss) is located in the city centre. It was the residence of the counts of Hesse-Darmstadt, later as Grand Dukes of Hesse by the grace of Napoleon. The rulers of Hesse also owned Jagdschloss Kranichstein, a hunting lodge in Kranichstein which is a nowadays used as a five star hotel. The most famous castle in the Darmstadt region is Frankenstein Castle due to claims that the real castle may have had an influence on Mary Shelley's decision to choose the name Frankenstein for her monster-creating scientist. This castle dates back to the 13th century, but it was acquired by the counts of Hesse-Darmstadt in 1662.

=== Russian Chapel ===
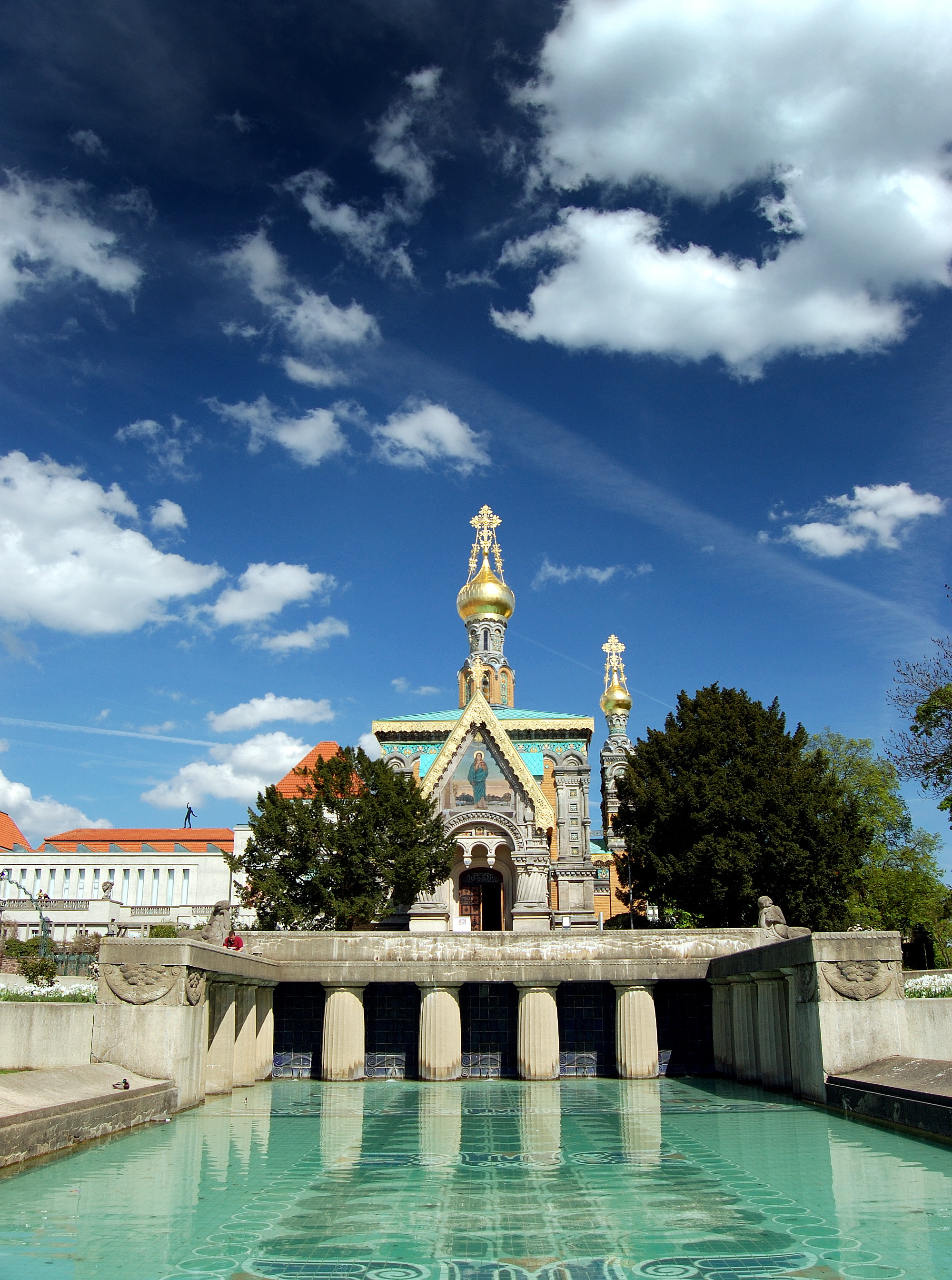
Russian Chapel in Darmstadt

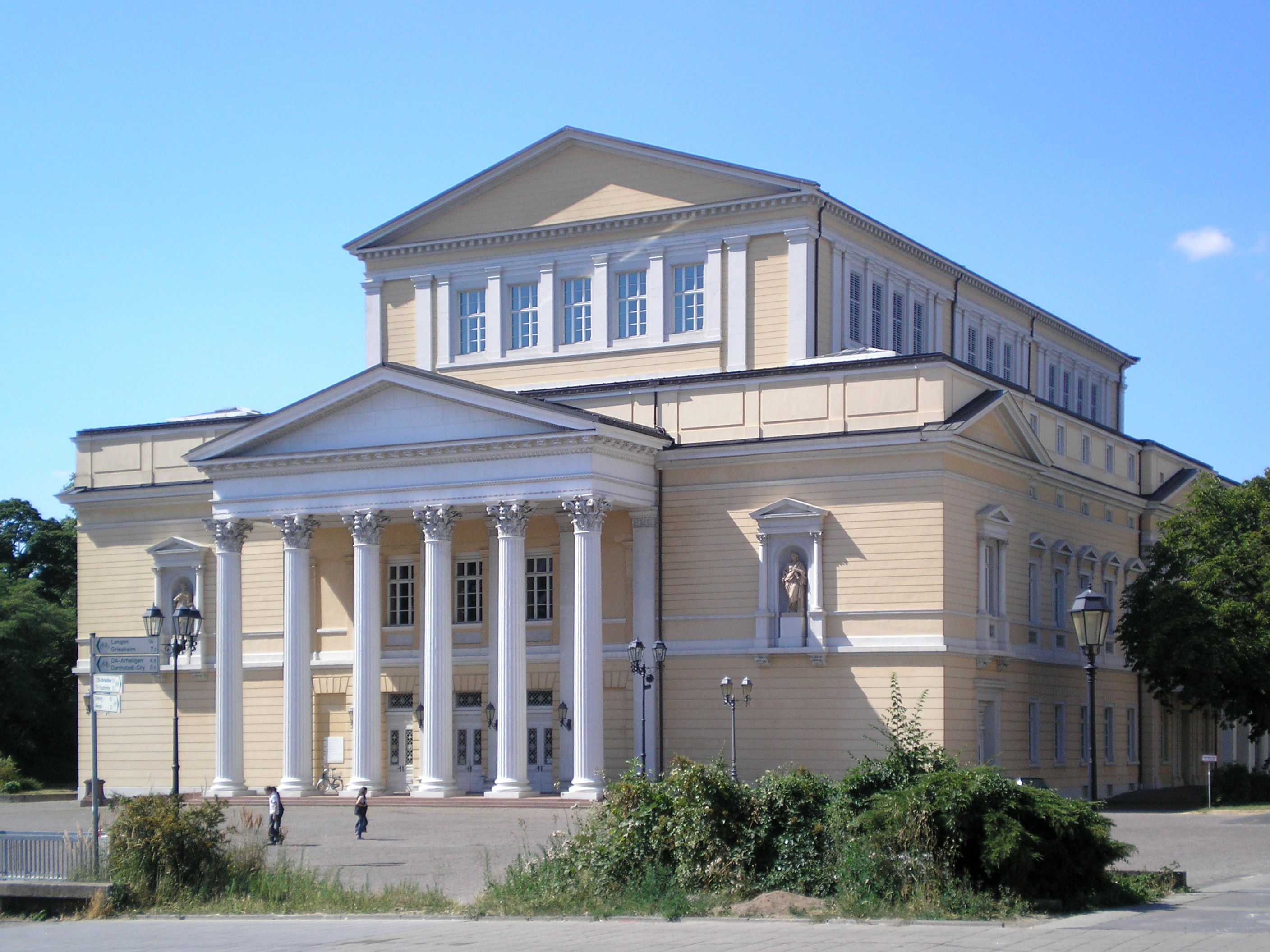
Haus der Geschichte

The last ruling Grand Duke of Hesse, Ernst Ludwig was a grandson of Queen Victoria and brother to Empress Alexandra of Russia. The architecture of Darmstadt has been influenced by British and Russian imperial architecture with many examples still existing, such as the Luisenplatz with its grand-ducal column, the old Hessian State Theatre and the Russian Chapel in Darmstadt. The Russian Chapel is a Russian orthodox church which is still in use. It was built and used as a private chapel by the last Tsar of Russia, Nicholas II, whose wife Alexandra was born in Darmstadt. Although Russian orthodox churches also exist in other cities outside Russia, the Russian Chapel in Darmstadt was the only official Russian church used by the Tsar outside the Russian Empire. It is said that the chapel was built on Russian soil that was brought to Darmstadt exclusively for the purpose of building the Tsar's private chapel on it. by Leon Benois. The Russian church, St. Mary Magdalene Chapel, is named in honor of the patron saint of Tsar Nicholas' mother and was built of Russian stone on Russian soil brought to Darmstadt by train. It was used by the Russian imperial family and court during regular visits to the Tsarina's brother and family in Darmstadt.

=== Modern architecture ===
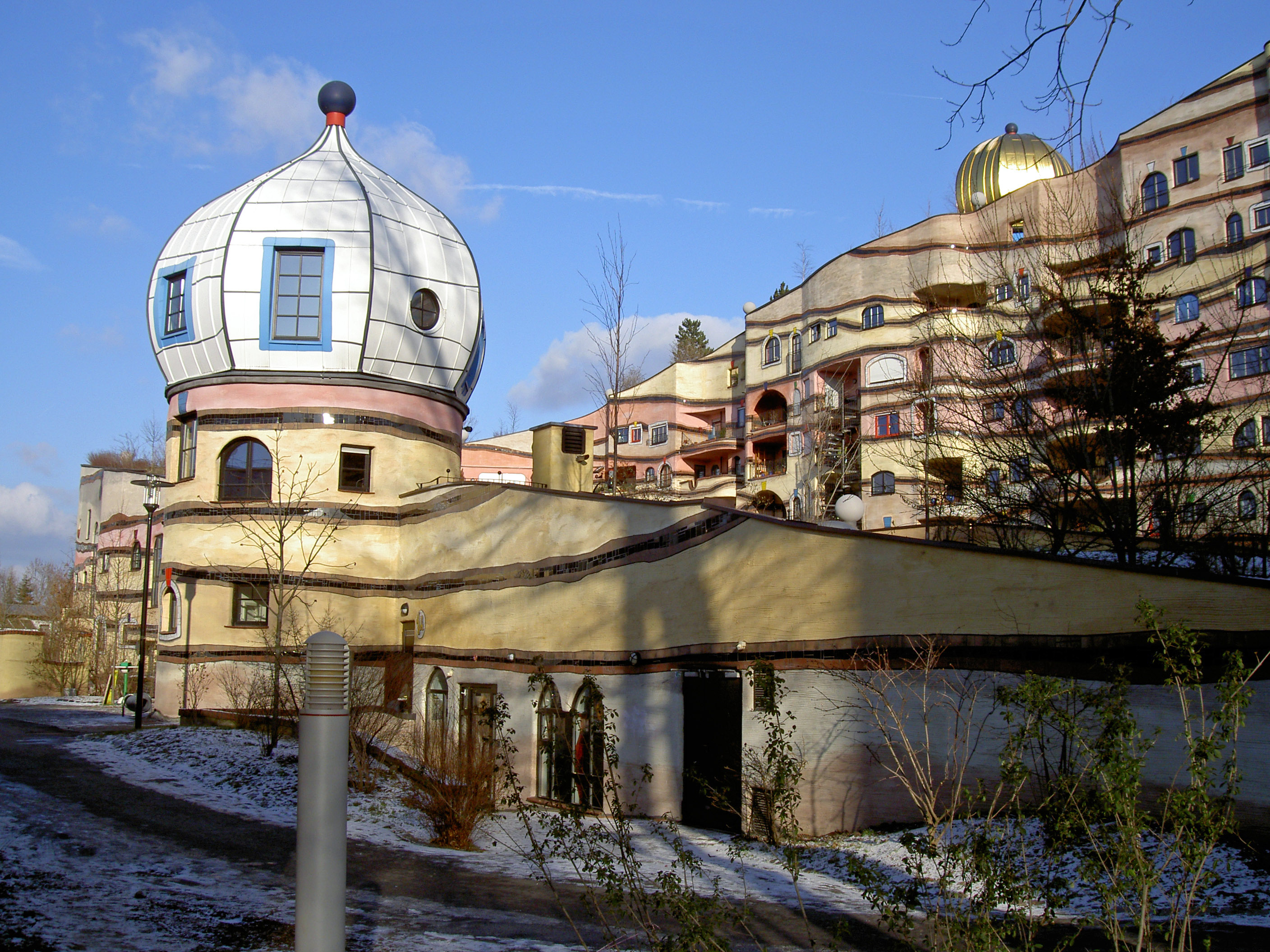
The Waldspirale

Darmstadt has a rich tradition in modern architecture. After 1945 several "Meisterbauten" (Masterful Architectonic Creations) were built that set standards for modern architecture. These buildings still exist and are used for various public and private purposes. In the late 1990s the Waldspirale ('Forest Spiral') was built, a residential complex by Austrian Friedensreich Hundertwasser. As an almost surreal building, it is internationally famous for its almost absolute rejection of rectangular forms, down to every window having a different shape, the style being a trademark of Hundertwasser's work. Hundertwasser died before the Waldspirale was finished.

=== Art Nouveau ===
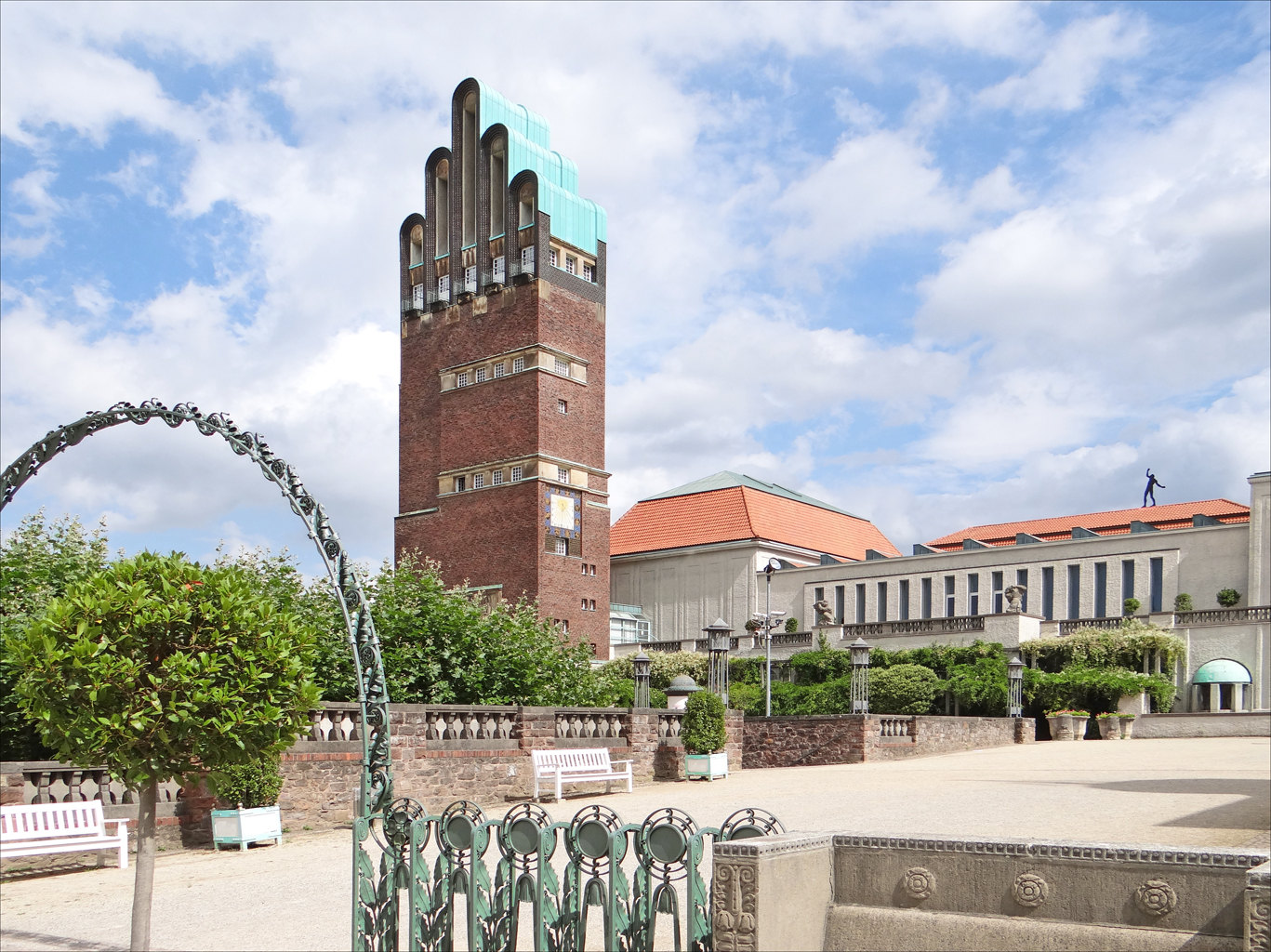
The Mathildenhöhe

Darmstadt was a centre of the Art Nouveau movement. Surviving examples of the Jugendstil period include the Rosenhöhe, a landscaped English-style rose garden from the 19th century, recently renovated and replanted, the UNESCO World Heritage Site Mathildenhöhe, with the Hochzeitsturm ('Wedding tower', also commonly known as the 'Five-Finger-Tower') by Joseph Maria Olbrich, the Russian Chapel in Darmstadt and large exhibition halls as well as many private villas built by Jugendstil architects who had settled in Darmstadt. German Art Nouveau is commonly known by its German name, Jugendstil. The name is taken from the artistic journal, Die Jugend, which was published in Munich and which espoused the new artistic movement. It was founded in 1896 by Georg Hirth (Hirth remained editor until his death in 1916, and the magazine continued to be published until 1940). The magazine was instrumental in promoting the style in Germany. As a result, its name was adopted as the most common German-language term for the style: Jugendstil ("young style"). Although, during the early 20th century, the word was applied to only two-dimensional examples of the graphic arts, especially the forms of organic typography and graphic design found in and influenced by German magazines like Jugend, Pan, and Simplicissimus, it is now applied to more general manifestations of Art Nouveau visual arts in Germany, the Netherlands, the Baltic states, and Nordic countries. The two main centres for Jugendstil art in Germany were Munich and Darmstadt.

=== Squares ===
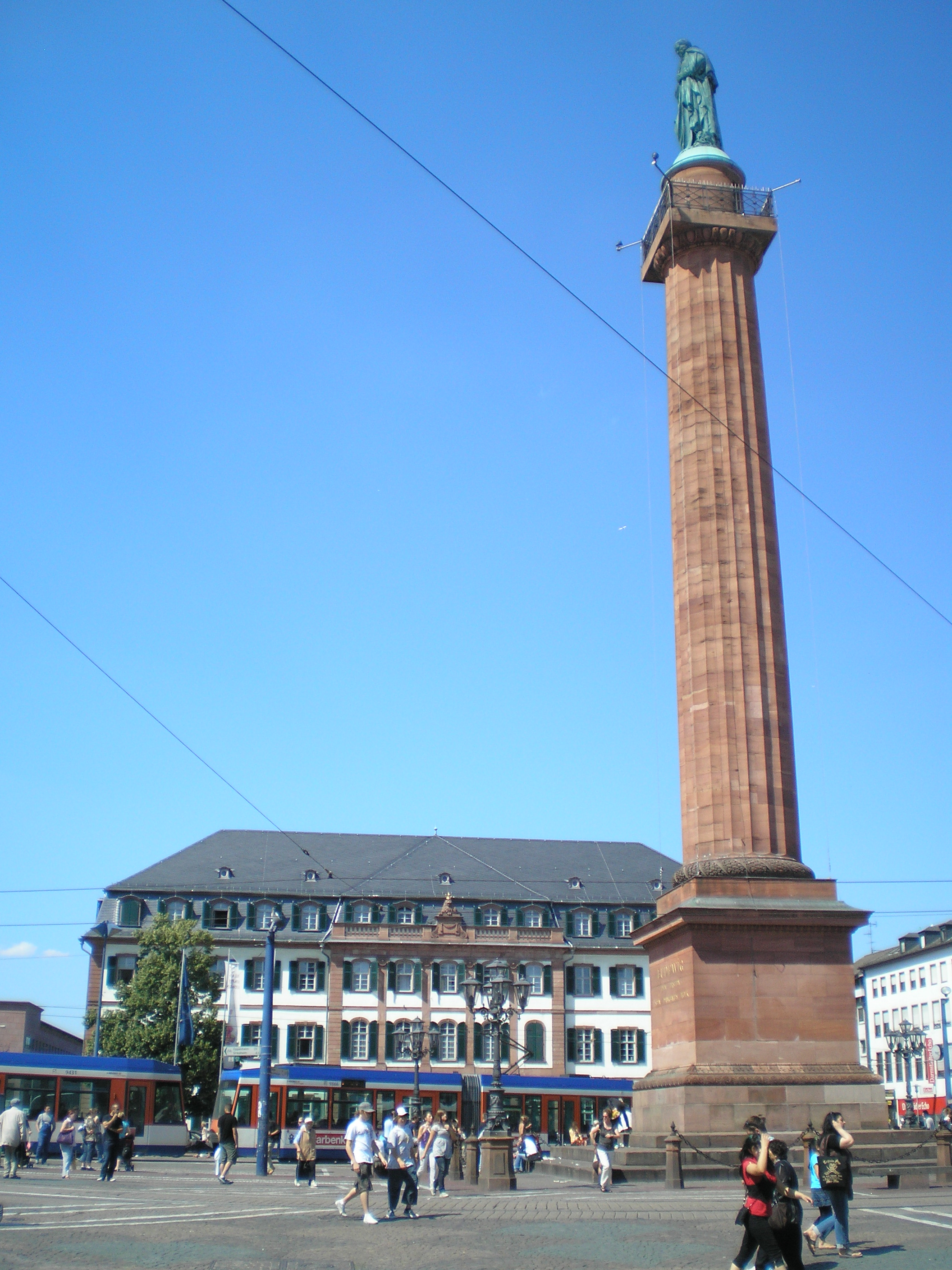
Luisenplatz with Ludwigsäule

The Luisenplatz, the central square of the city, forms the centre of the city and is the main public transport hub. In 1844 the Ludwigsäule (called Langer Lui, meaning Long Ludwig), a 33-metre (108 ft) column commemorating Ludwig I, first Grand Duke of Hesse, was placed in the middle of the square. While the column still stands, the square is today surrounded by mostly modern buildings. Other important squares are the Marktplatz (see image) near the old city hall and the Sabaisplatz at the Mathildenhöhe.

=== Parks ===
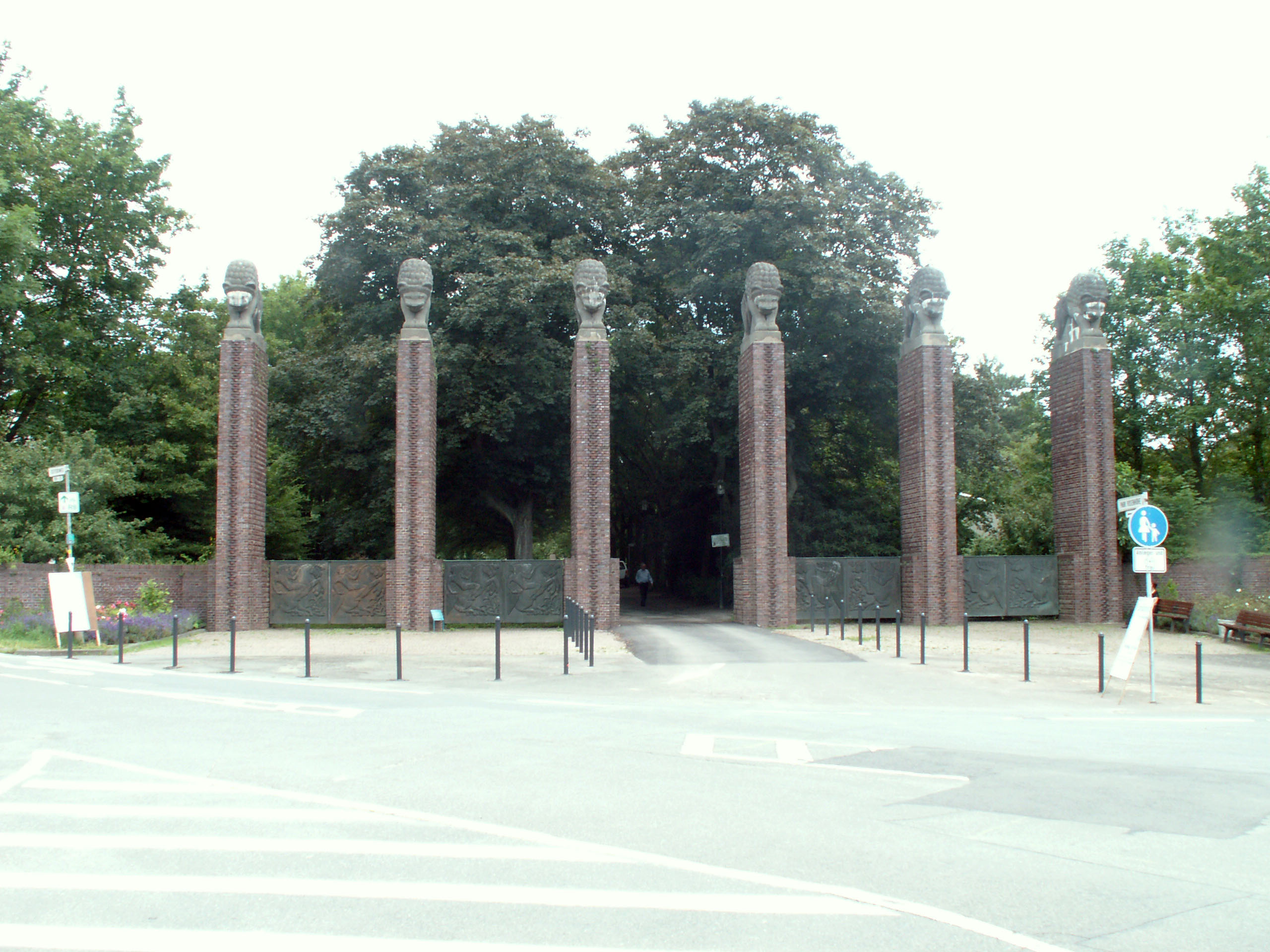
Park Rosenhöhe

The city has a high density of parks. Among the most important parks are the English style Herrngarten in central Darmstadt. In former times it was part of the Royal Gardens used exclusively by the dukes of Darmstadt. Today it is a public park, heavily used in every season of the year. Other important parks are the French style parks Prinz-Georgs-Garten and Orangerie, the modern style Bürgerpark ("People's Park") in northern Darmstadt and the mystical Rosenhöhe Park ("Rose Heights"), which also serves as the cemetery for the grand dukes and their immediate family, with two impressive mausoleum buildings (the Old Mausoleum and New Mausoleum) standing within it. The Botanischer Garten in eastern Darmstadt is a botanical garden maintained by the Technische Universität Darmstadt with a fine collection of rare plants and trees.

=== Churches ===
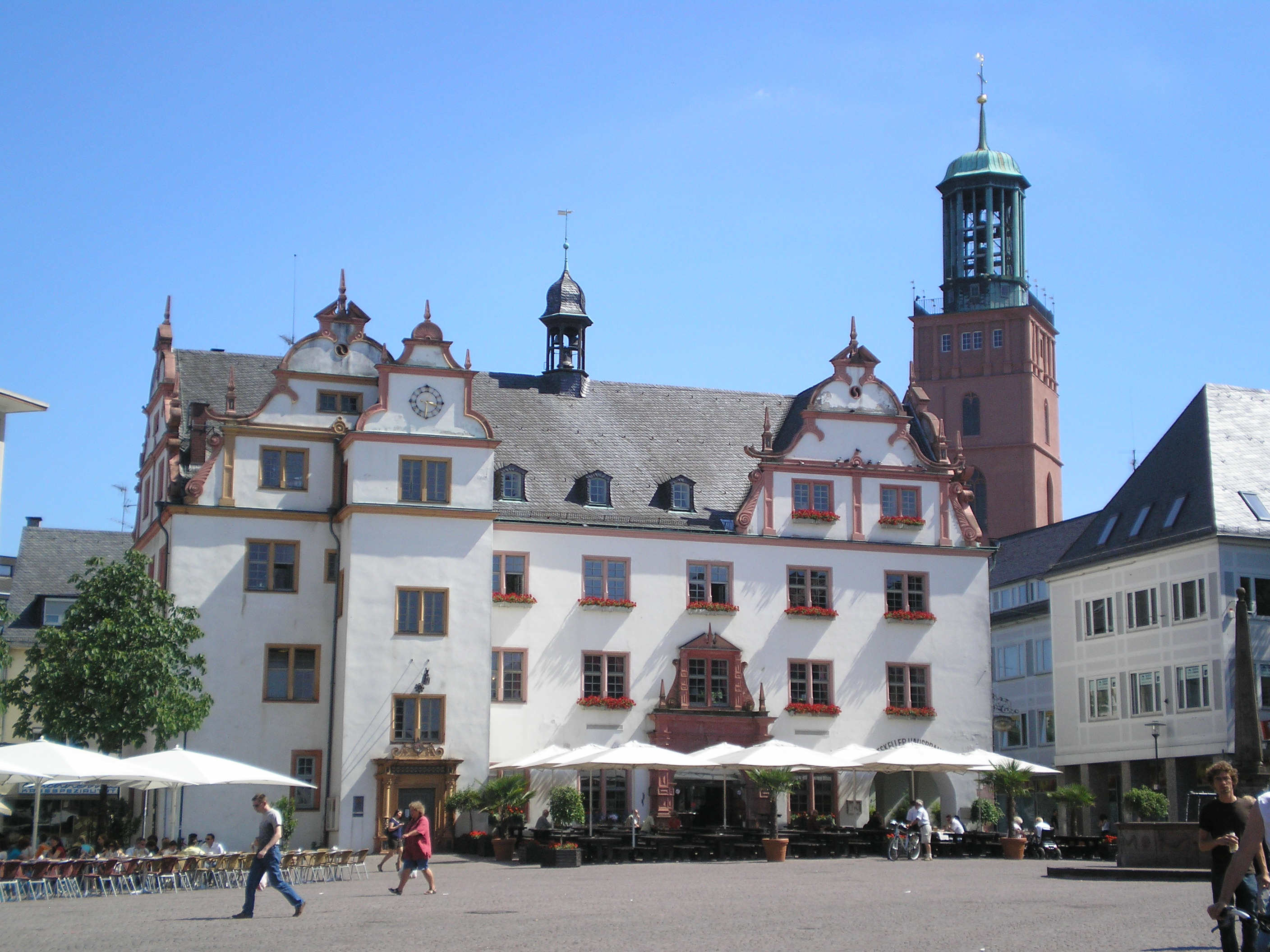
Marktplatz with the old city hall and Stadtkirche Church

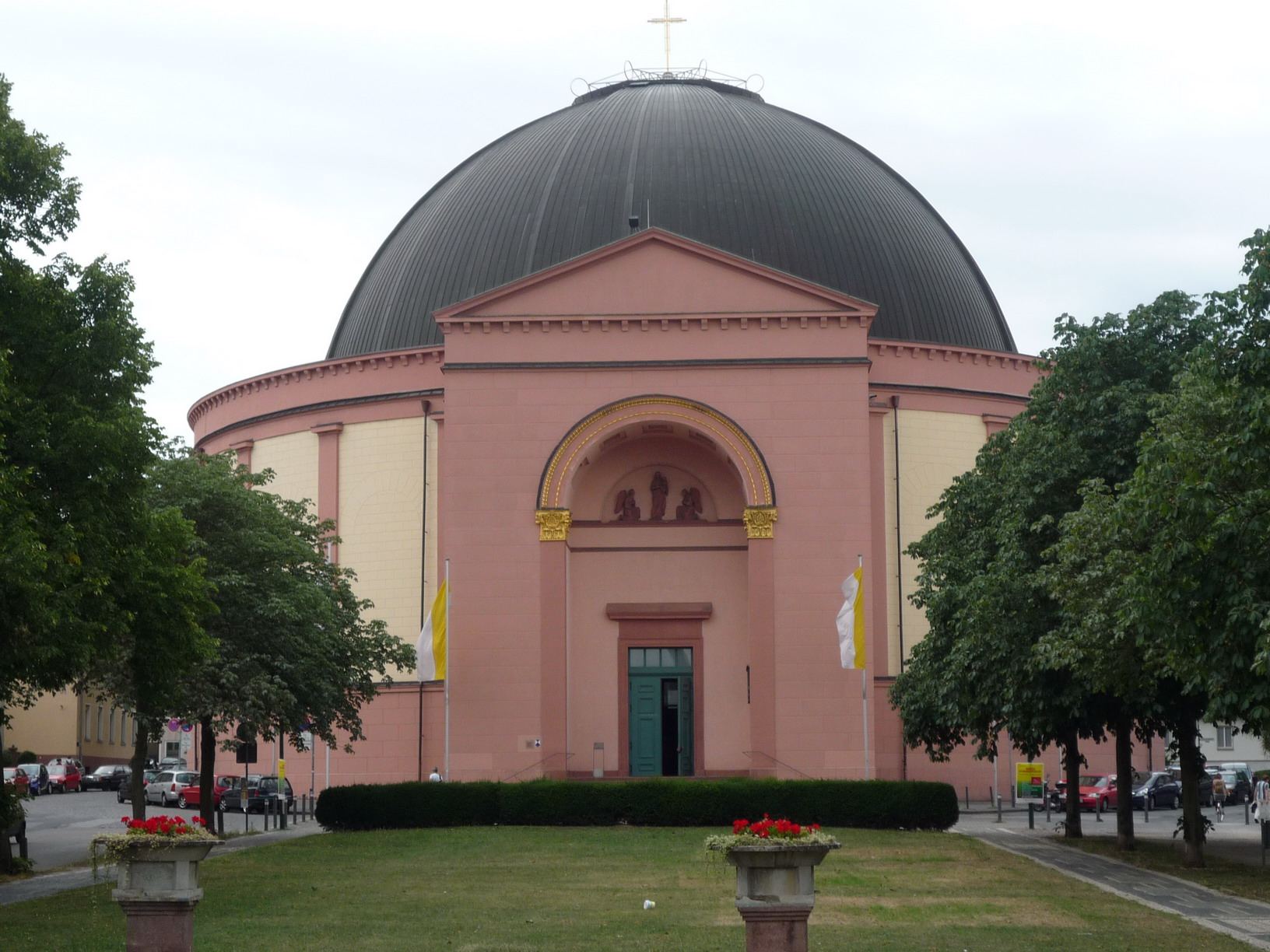
St. Ludwig Church

The Protestant Stadtkirche Darmstadt built in 1369, is in the pedestrian zone of the downtown city center, next to the historic Hotel Bockshaut. The church has gothic elements along with renaissance and baroque, it houses the royal crypt. Hotel Bockshaut was built in 1580 for a church presbytery. The most important Catholic Church is St. Ludwig in central Darmstadt.

=== Festivals ===
Every year on the first weekend of July the Heinerfest festival is held in the streets surrounding the old ducal palace. It is a traditional German festival with music acts, beer halls, amusement rides and booths selling trinkets and food. The Schlossgrabenfest, better known as the Stage Groove Festival, is live music-oriented and is held every year in May. These two festivals attract 700,000 and 400,000 visitors respectively.

== Culture ==
Darmstadt has a rich cultural heritage. The Staatstheater Darmstadt dates back to the year 1711. The present building has been in use since 1972 and has three halls which can be used independently. The "Grand Hall" (Großes Haus) provides seats for 956 people and serves as Darmstadt's opera house. The "Small Hall" (Kleines Haus) is mostly used for plays and dance and has 482 seats. A separate small hall (Kammerspiele), with 120 seats, is used for chamber plays.

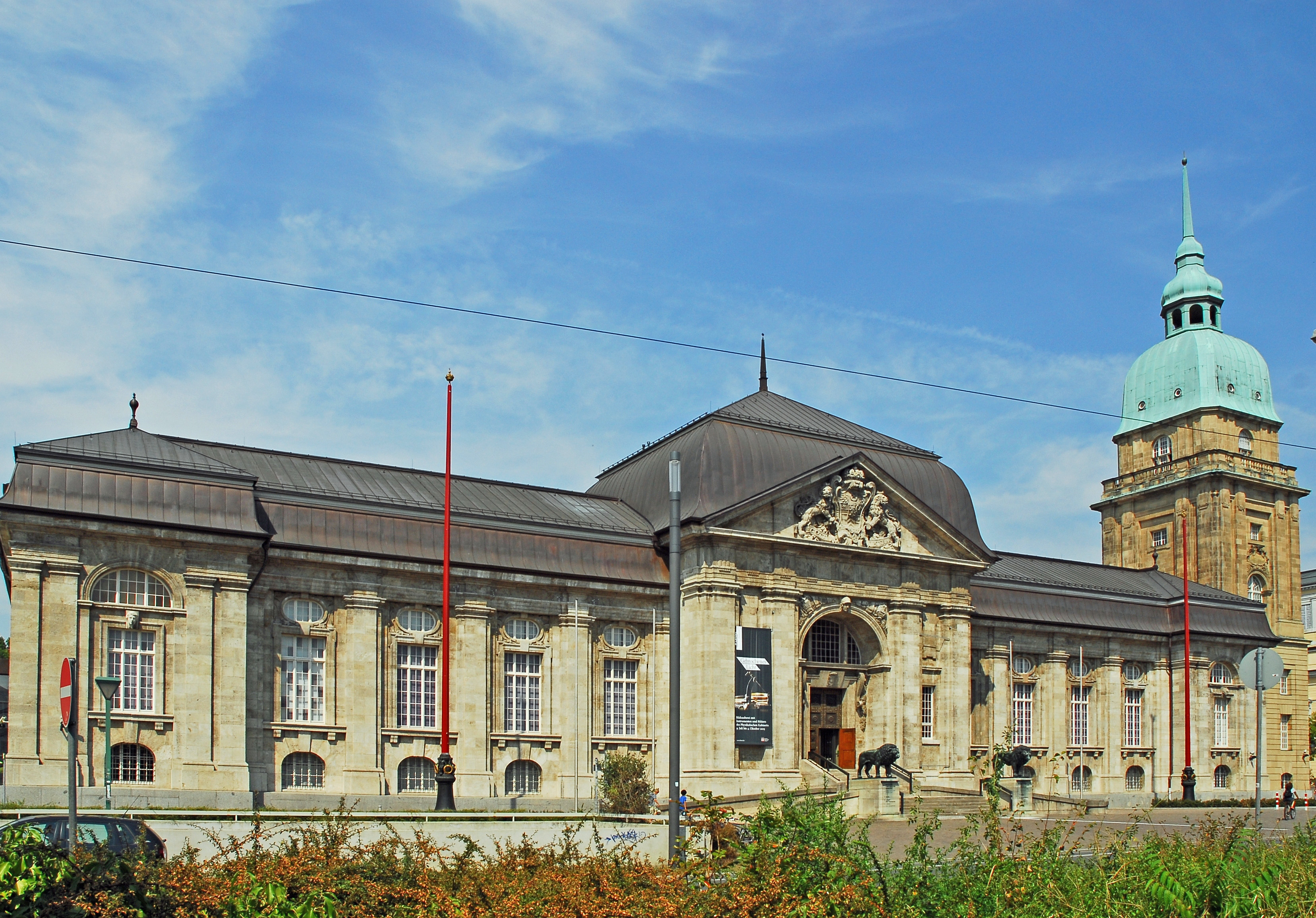
Hessisches Landesmuseum Darmstadt (Hessian State Museum)

Among the museums in Darmstadt the most important are the Hessisches Landesmuseum (Hessian State Museum), the Porcelain Museum (exhibition of the ducal porcelain), the Schlossmuseum (Palace Museum exhibiting the ducal residence and possessions), the Kunsthalle Darmstadt (exhibitions of modern art), the exhibition centre Mathildenhöhe, and the Museum Künstlerkolonie (Art Nouveau museum).

The Darmstadt Palace Museum collection showcases regional and royal history from the 16th until the early 20th Century. The Palace Museum consists of 16 showrooms.

The Jazz-Institut Darmstadt is Germany's largest publicly accessible jazz archive.

The Internationales Musikinstitut Darmstadt, harboring one of the world's largest collections of post-war sheet music, also hosts the biennial Internationale Ferienkurse für Neue Musik, a summer school in contemporary classical music founded by Wolfgang Steinecke. A large number of avant-garde composers have attended and given lectures there, including Olivier Messiaen, Luciano Berio, Milton Babbitt, Pierre Boulez, Luigi Nono, John Cage, György Ligeti, Iannis Xenakis, Karlheinz Stockhausen, Mauricio Kagel, and Helmut Lachenmann.

The Deutsche Akademie für Sprache und Dichtung provides writers and scholars with a place to research the German language. The academy's annual Georg Büchner Prize, named in memory of Georg Büchner, is considered the most prestigious literary award for writers of German language.

== Geography ==
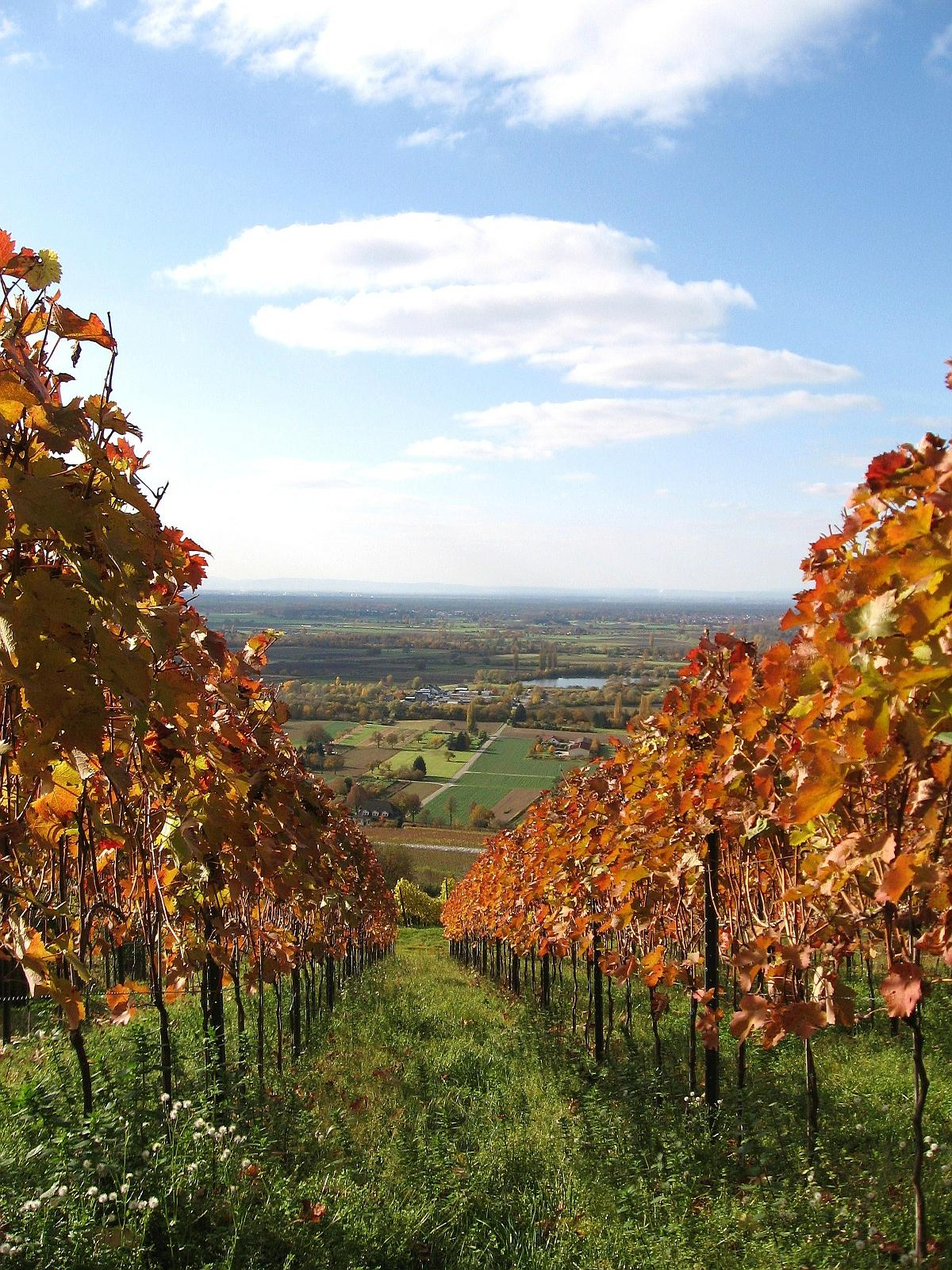
Vineyards south of Darmstadt – view towards the Rhine Plain

Darmstadt is located in the Upper Rhine Plain (German: Oberrheinische Tiefebene), a major rift, about 350 km (217 mi) long and on average 50 km (31 mi) wide, between the cities of Frankfurt in the north and Mannheim in the south. Darmstadt's southeastern boroughs are located in the spurs of the Odenwald, a low mountain range in Southern Hesse between the Main and Neckar rivers.

=== Climate ===
Southern Hesse is well known for its mild climate which allows winegrowing on a large scale in the region south of Darmstadt. The weather is often volatile with the summers being warm and humid with frequent thunderstorms, the winters mostly relatively mild with frequent periods of high fog. Snowfall is most likely in January and February, but mild winters without considerable snowfall can occur.

The Darmstadt weather station has recorded the following extreme values:

- Highest Temperature 40.3 °C (104.5 °F) on 27 June 2026.
- Warmest Minimum 24.1 °C (75.4 °F) on 5 July 1957.
- Coldest Maximum −15.5 °C (4.1 °F) on 1 February 1956.
- Lowest Temperature −26.9 °C (−16.4 °F) on 19 January 1940.
- Highest Daily Precipitation 60.7 mm (2.39 in) on 1 June 1961.
- Wettest Month 211.9 mm (8.34 in) in August 1968.
- Wettest Year 1,215.7 mm (47.86 in) in 1965.
- Driest Year 476.2 mm (18.75 in) in 1959.
- Earliest Snowfall: 27 October 1950.
- Latest Snowfall: 19 April 1969.

Climate data for Darmstadt (1991–2020 normals, extremes 1937–present (Note: Meteorological observations began in Darmstadt in 1937. Data from 3 February 1937 to 31 July 1974 are from Darmstadt-Botanischer Garten, data from 1 January 1987 to 31 July 1995 are from Darmstadt (A), and data from 1 August 1995 to the present are from the Darmstadt meteorological station.))
Month	Jan	Feb	Mar	Apr	May	Jun	Jul	Aug	Sep	Oct	Nov	Dec	Year
Record high °C (°F)	16.0 (60.8)	19.6 (67.3)	25.6 (78.1)	31.5 (88.7)	33.3 (91.9)	40.3 (104.5)	39.3 (102.7)	39.5 (103.1)	34.8 (94.6)	27.4 (81.3)	22.6 (72.7)	18.1 (64.6)	39.5 (103.1)
Mean maximum °C (°F)	12.0 (53.6)	14.0 (57.2)	19.4 (66.9)	25.2 (77.4)	29.0 (84.2)	32.3 (90.1)	34.0 (93.2)	33.4 (92.1)	27.7 (81.9)	22.3 (72.1)	16.1 (61.0)	12.4 (54.3)	35.4 (95.7)
Mean daily maximum °C (°F)	4.7 (40.5)	6.5 (43.7)	11.4 (52.5)	16.6 (61.9)	20.6 (69.1)	23.9 (75.0)	26.0 (78.8)	25.7 (78.3)	20.7 (69.3)	14.8 (58.6)	8.8 (47.8)	5.3 (41.5)	15.5 (59.9)
Daily mean °C (°F)	2.0 (35.6)	2.7 (36.9)	6.2 (43.2)	10.4 (50.7)	14.4 (57.9)	17.8 (64.0)	19.6 (67.3)	19.0 (66.2)	14.6 (58.3)	10.1 (50.2)	5.7 (42.3)	2.8 (37.0)	10.4 (50.7)
Mean daily minimum °C (°F)	−1.0 (30.2)	−0.9 (30.4)	1.4 (34.5)	4.1 (39.4)	8.2 (46.8)	11.6 (52.9)	13.6 (56.5)	13.1 (55.6)	9.4 (48.9)	5.9 (42.6)	2.5 (36.5)	−0.1 (31.8)	5.7 (42.3)
Mean minimum °C (°F)	−10.4 (13.3)	−8.7 (16.3)	−5.6 (21.9)	−2.6 (27.3)	1.2 (34.2)	5.7 (42.3)	7.9 (46.2)	7.3 (45.1)	3.3 (37.9)	−1.5 (29.3)	−4.6 (23.7)	−9.2 (15.4)	−13.0 (8.6)
Record low °C (°F)	−26.9 (−16.4)	−22.5 (−8.5)	−13.5 (7.7)	−7.6 (18.3)	−3.2 (26.2)	0.8 (33.4)	3.5 (38.3)	4.1 (39.4)	−0.4 (31.3)	−6.8 (19.8)	−9.5 (14.9)	−21.0 (−5.8)	−26.9 (−16.4)
Average precipitation mm (inches)	51.4 (2.02)	49.2 (1.94)	52.0 (2.05)	43.0 (1.69)	72.6 (2.86)	63.3 (2.49)	72.1 (2.84)	67.1 (2.64)	57.9 (2.28)	59.0 (2.32)	57.7 (2.27)	67.1 (2.64)	712.4 (28.05)
Average extreme snow depth cm (inches)	4.2 (1.7)	4.1 (1.6)	2.7 (1.1)	0.1 (0.0)	0 (0)	0 (0)	0 (0)	0 (0)	0 (0)	0 (0)	1.6 (0.6)	4.9 (1.9)	9.5 (3.7)
Average precipitation days (≥ 0.1 mm)	16.2	14.9	14.3	12.9	14.4	13.7	14.4	13.2	12.6	14.7	15.9	18.0	175.2
Average relative humidity (%)	84.1	79.9	74.0	68.2	70.2	69.7	69.6	72.4	79.0	84.4	86.8	86.8	77.1
Mean monthly sunshine hours	47	80	120	176	208	214	232	218	158	103	50	37	1,643
Source: DWD Open Data (Mean sunshine hours 1981–2010)

== Education ==
=== Schools ===
The City of Darmstadt offers students a broad variety of public primary, secondary and tertiary schools. Besides them private schools exist, e.g. the catholic secondary school Edith-Stein-Schule, the Adventists' Schulzentrum Marienhöhe, an anthroposophic Waldorf School, a Comenius School and other faith based private schools.

=== Universities ===
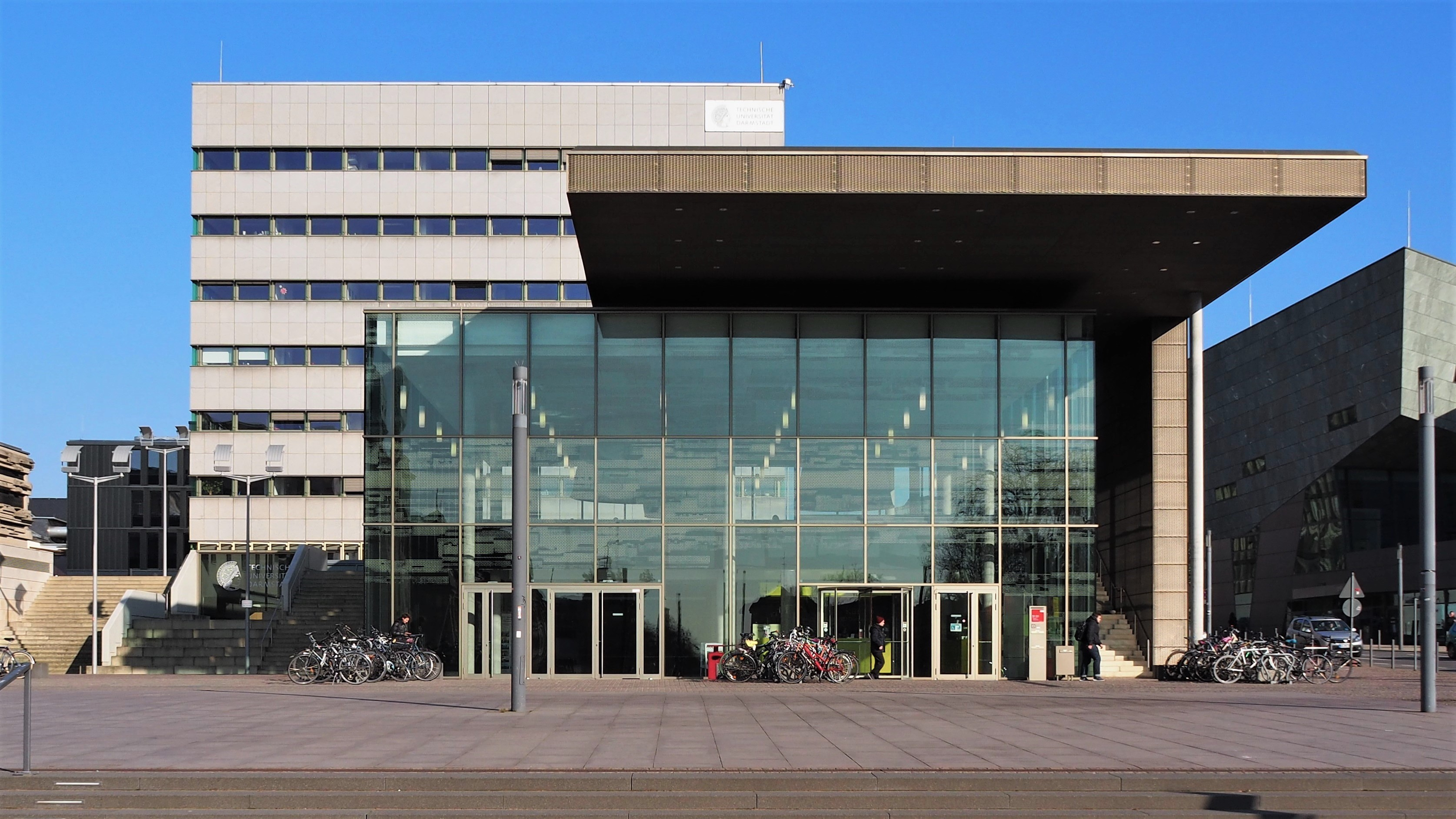
Technical University (TU) main entrance

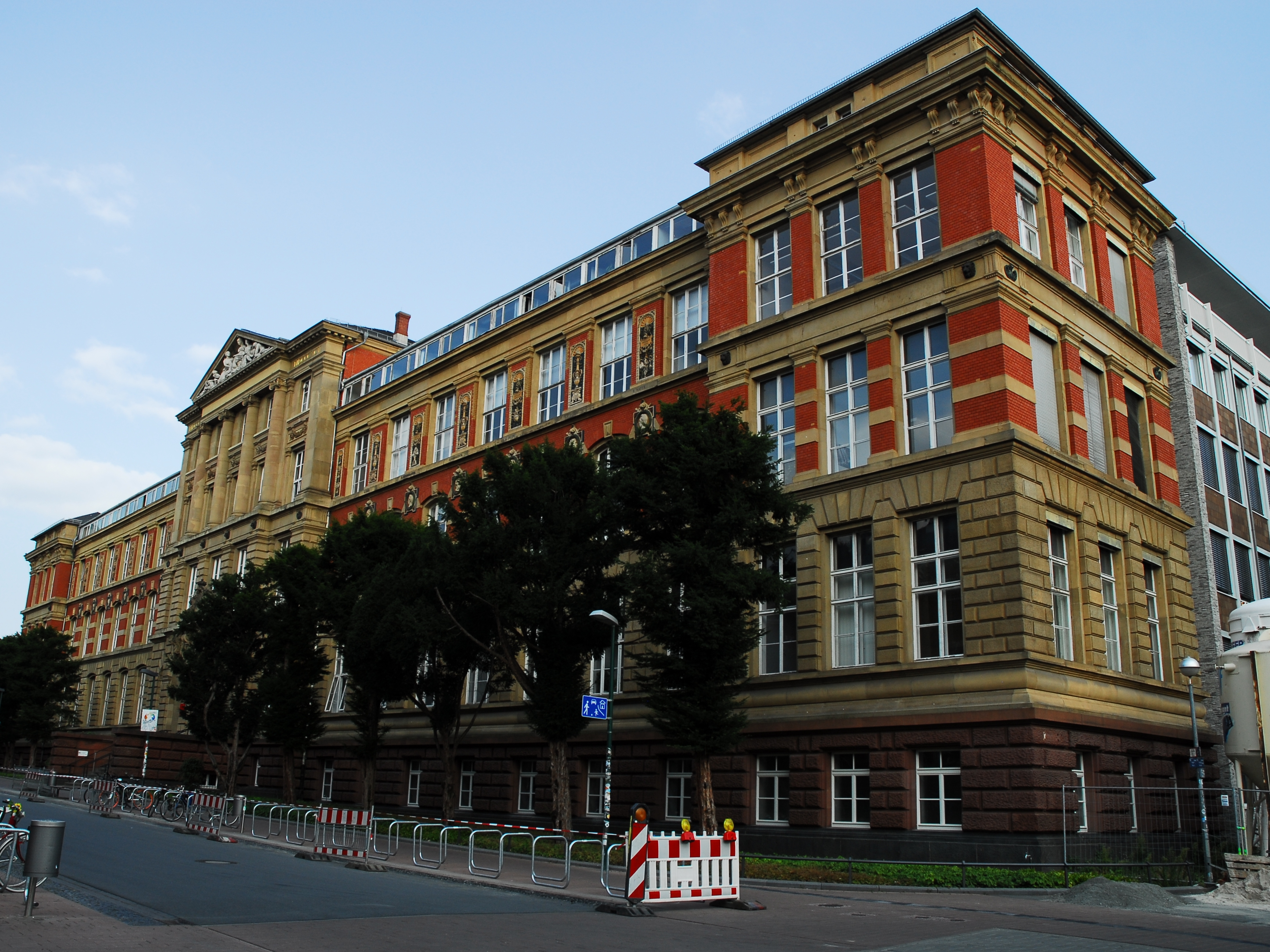
Old Main Building of TU Darmstadt

==== TU Darmstadt ====
The Technical University of Darmstadt (German: Technische Universität Darmstadt), commonly referred to as TU Darmstadt, is a prestigious research university in Germany. It was founded in 1877 and received the right to award doctorates in 1899. In 1882 it was the first university in the world to set up a chair in electrical engineering, in 1883 the first faculty for electrical engineering was founded there. The university is organized in 13 departments and 5 fields of study, which all together offer about 100 courses of studies. The fields of study offer interdisciplinary degree courses in which students take lectures in multiple departments. The university, as its title suggests, offers degree courses in the fields of electrical, mechanical and civil engineering, architecture, computer science, mathematics and the natural sciences. It also offers courses in economics, law, history, politics, sociology, psychology, sport science and linguistics. It also offers degree courses for teaching positions at German vocational schools and Gymnasiums.

==== Hochschule Darmstadt ====
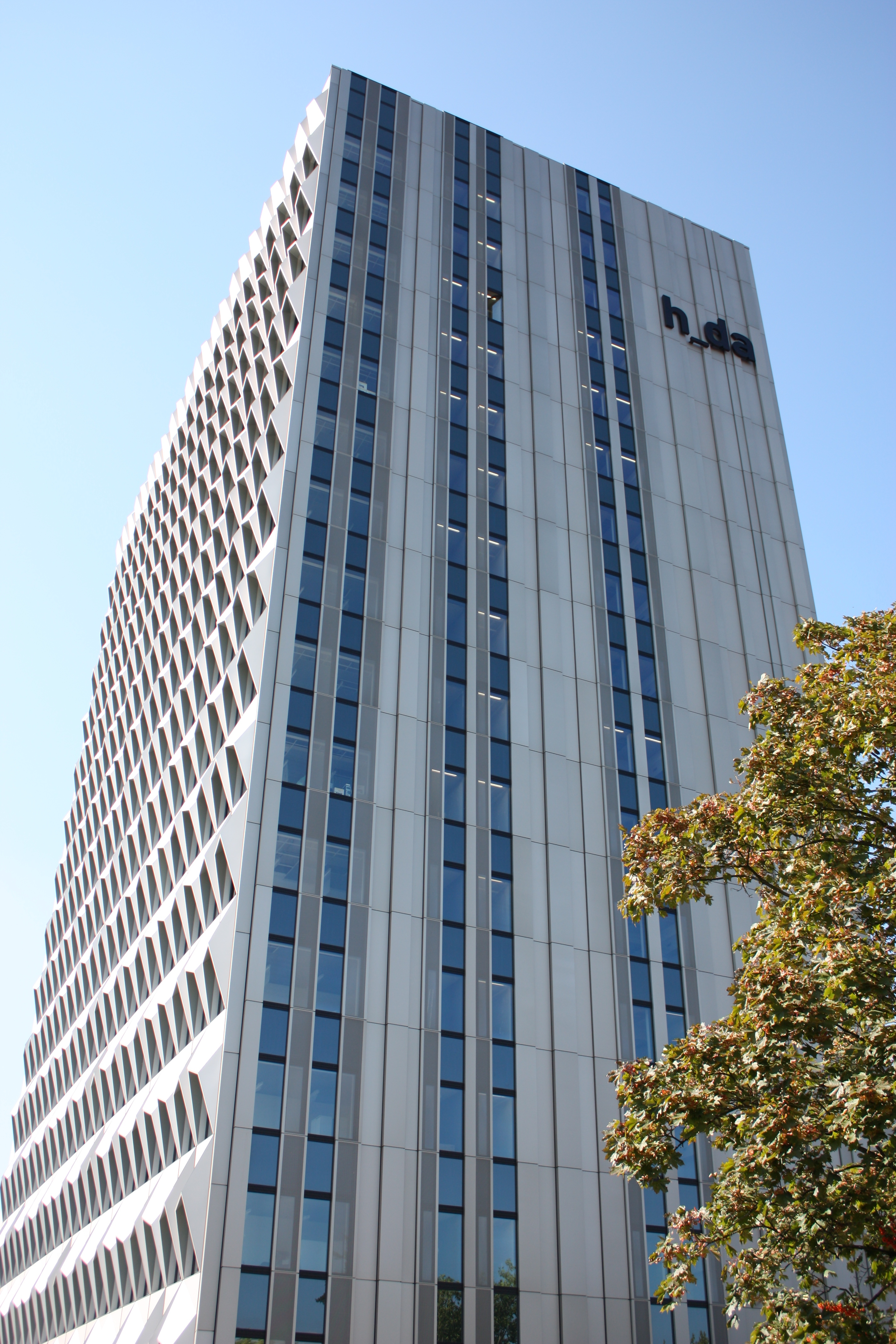
Darmstadt University of Applied Sciences – main building

The Darmstadt University of Applied Sciences (German: Hochschule Darmstadt) has the highest number of industrial linkage programs, compared to the rest of the universities of applied sciences. The roots of University of Applied Sciences Darmstadt dates back to 1876. However, it has not emerged as a separate institution before 1971. As of 2017 it was the largest University of Applied Sciences in the State of Hesse, with about 16,000 students. It offers courses in architecture, chemical engineering, materials science, civil engineering, computer science, design, economics, electrical engineering and information technology, mathematics and science, mechanical engineering, media (including information science and engineering), plastics engineering, social and cultural studies, and several social sciences.

==== EHD Darmstadt ====
The Protestant University of Applied Sciences Darmstadt (EHD) is an officially recognised and Church-sponsored University. The sponsors are the Protestant Church in Hesse and Nassau, the Protestant Church of Kurhesse-Waldeck and the social welfare organisation of both Hessian Protestant Churches, the Diakonie Hesse. The EHD has approximately 1,700 students, 40 professors and 10 scientific employees and about 100 visiting lecturers every semester.

== Sport ==
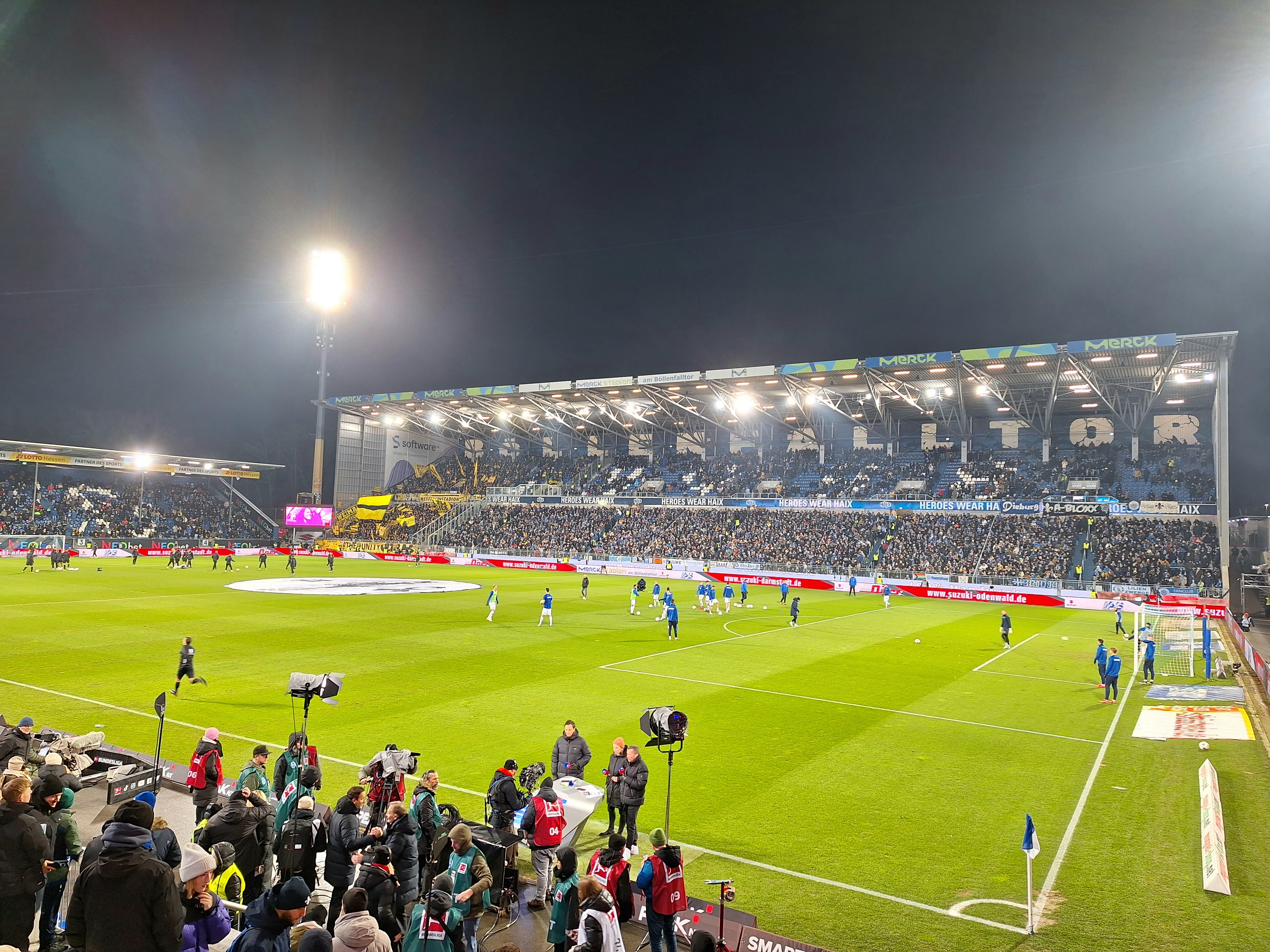
Merck-Stadion am Böllenfalltor

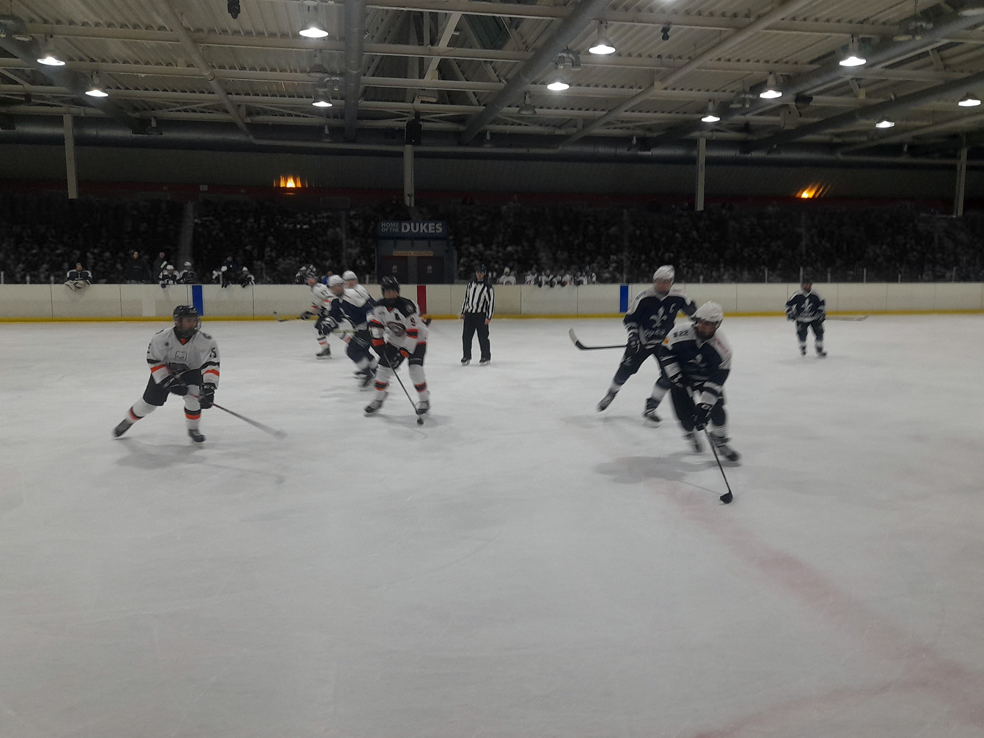
Darmstadt Dukes in the Eissporthalle

=== Football ===
The city's main professional club is the football club SV Darmstadt 98, who play at the Merck-Stadion am Böllenfalltor. Other, amateur football clubs are 1. FCA Darmstadt and Rot-Weiß Darmstadt.

=== Ice hockey ===
The Darmstadt Dukes (Eissportclub Darmstadt Dukes) is an ice hockey club. Their mens`s team is playing in the Hessenliga.

=== American football ===
The city is home to the Darmstadt Diamonds an american football team.

== Institutions ==
=== Technology ===
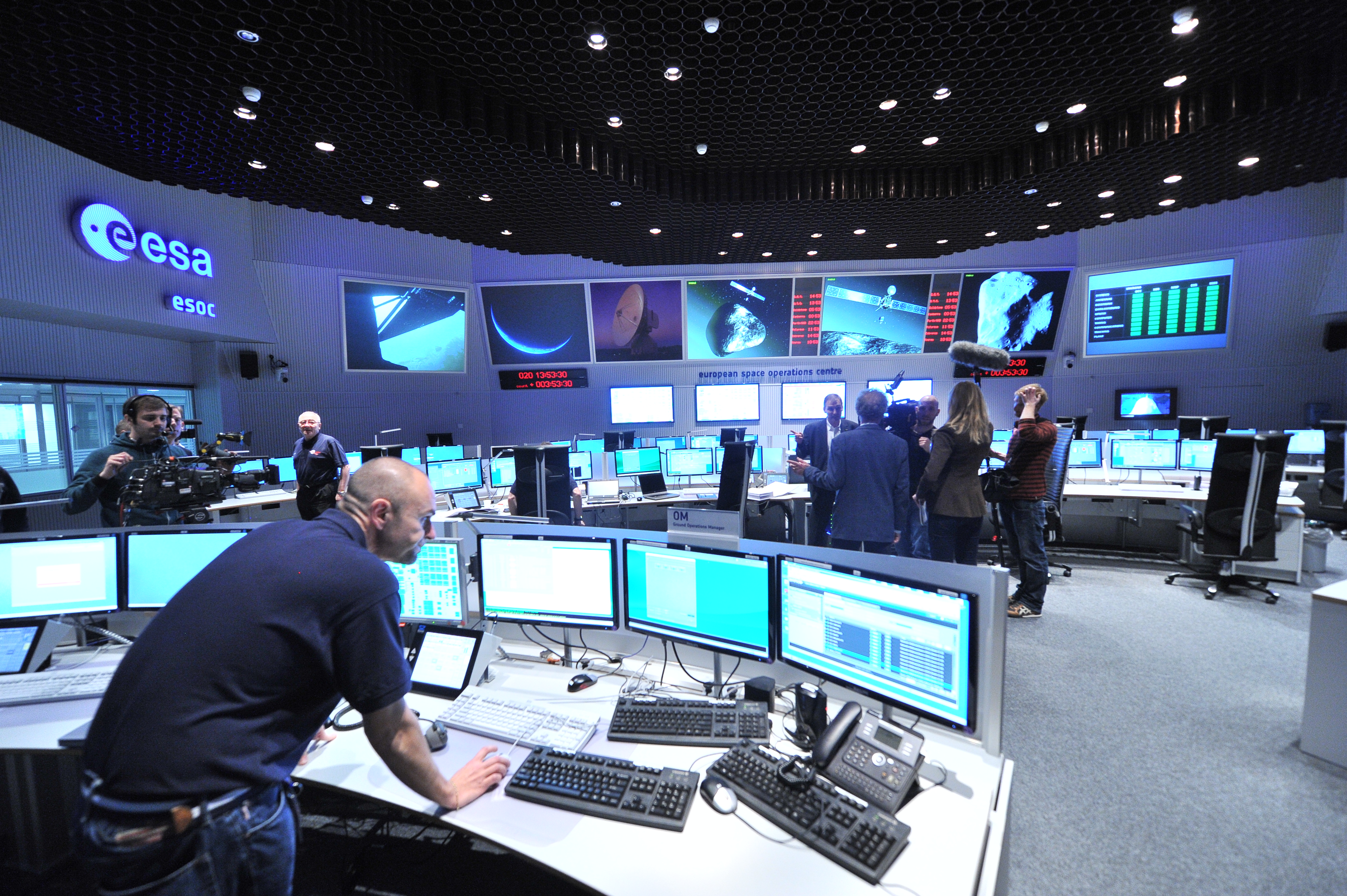
The ESOC European Space Operations Command in Darmstadt

Darmstadt is home to many research institutions such as the Fraunhofer Society (Fraunhofer IGD, Fraunhofer LBF, Fraunhofer SIT) and the Gesellschaft für Schwerionenforschung (GSI, "Society for heavy ion Research"), which operates a particle accelerator in northern Darmstadt. The GSI, amongst other elements, discovered the chemical element darmstadtium (atomic number: 110), named after the city in 2003. This makes Darmstadt one of several cities with elements named after them. Various other elements, including meitnerium (atomic number: 109) (1982), hassium (atomic number: 108) (1984), roentgenium (atomic number: 111) (1994) and copernicium (atomic number: 112) (1996) were also synthesized in the Darmstadt facility.

The European Space Operations Centre (ESOC) of the European Space Agency is located in Darmstadt. From here, various deep-space exploration spacecraft and Earth-orbiting satellites are operated for the purposes of scientific research, and technology development and demonstration.

EUMETSAT, the European Organisation for the Exploitation of Meteorological Satellites, operates the principal European meteorological satellites from its headquarters, including the first and second generations of Meteosat geostationary satellites, and the polar-orbiting Metop series.

Darmstadt is a centre for the pharmaceutical and chemical industry, with Merck, Röhm and Schenck RoTec (part of The Dürr Group) having their main plants and centres here.

Darmstadt is also a centre for the IT and telecommunications industry, with companies like Software AG, T-Systems (laboratories in Darmstadt) and Deutsche Telekom (laboratories in Darmstadt).

ATHENE, formerly Center for Research in Security and Privacy (CRISP), is the national research center for IT security and privacy in Germany and the largest research center for IT security in Europe. The research center is located in Darmstadt and deals with key issues of IT security in the digitization of government, business and society.

The German Research Center for Artificial Intelligence has a laboratory in Darmstadt.

The Hessian Center for Artificial Intelligence (hessian.AI) has its headquarters in Darmstadt.

=== United States military presence ===
U.S. forces entered the city of Darmstadt on 25 March 1945. At the end of World War II, Darmstadt was among the 112 communities where U.S. forces were stationed. Early units stationed here included elements of the U.S. Constabulary, Air Force units and a Quartermaster School.

Over the years, the U.S. military community Darmstadt – under a variety of designations such as the 440th Signal Battalion, served as home for thousands of American soldiers and their families. It included six principal installations in Darmstadt and nearby Babenhausen, Griesheim and Münster, plus several housing areas, an airfield and a large number of smaller facilities as far away as Bensheim and Aschaffenburg. The military newspaper European Stars and Stripes also had its headquarters there. As of 1993, the Darmstadt military community also assumed responsibility for the remaining U.S. Army facilities in the Frankfurt area.

As part of the U.S. Army's ongoing transformation in Germany, the Darmstadt military community, by then designated U.S. Army Garrison Darmstadt, inactivated on 30 September 2008. Even after the garrison inactivation, however, there is still one unit active in Darmstadt: The 66th Military Intelligence Group at the Dagger Complex on Eberstädter Weg. It draws its support from the nearby U.S. Army Garrison Wiesbaden. The U.S. Army Garrison Wiesbaden's website mentions the unit still being active in Darmstadt, and a Marine Corps company being stationed there as well. With the exception of Dagger Complex, all remaining US installations are now empty and closed to the public, pending property disposal by the German authorities.

== Tourist sights in Darmstadt ==
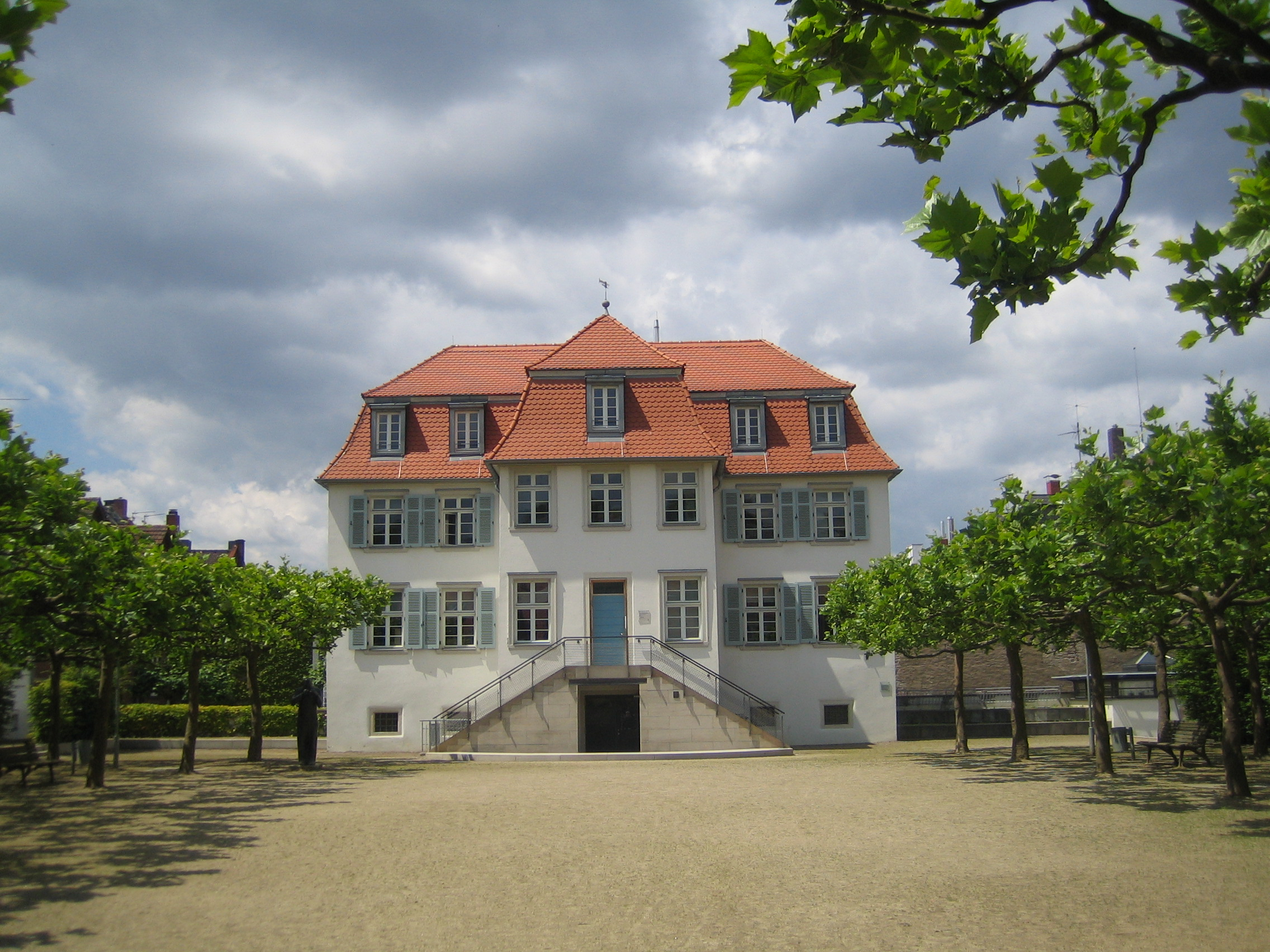
Bessunger Jagdhof und Kavaliershaus 2009

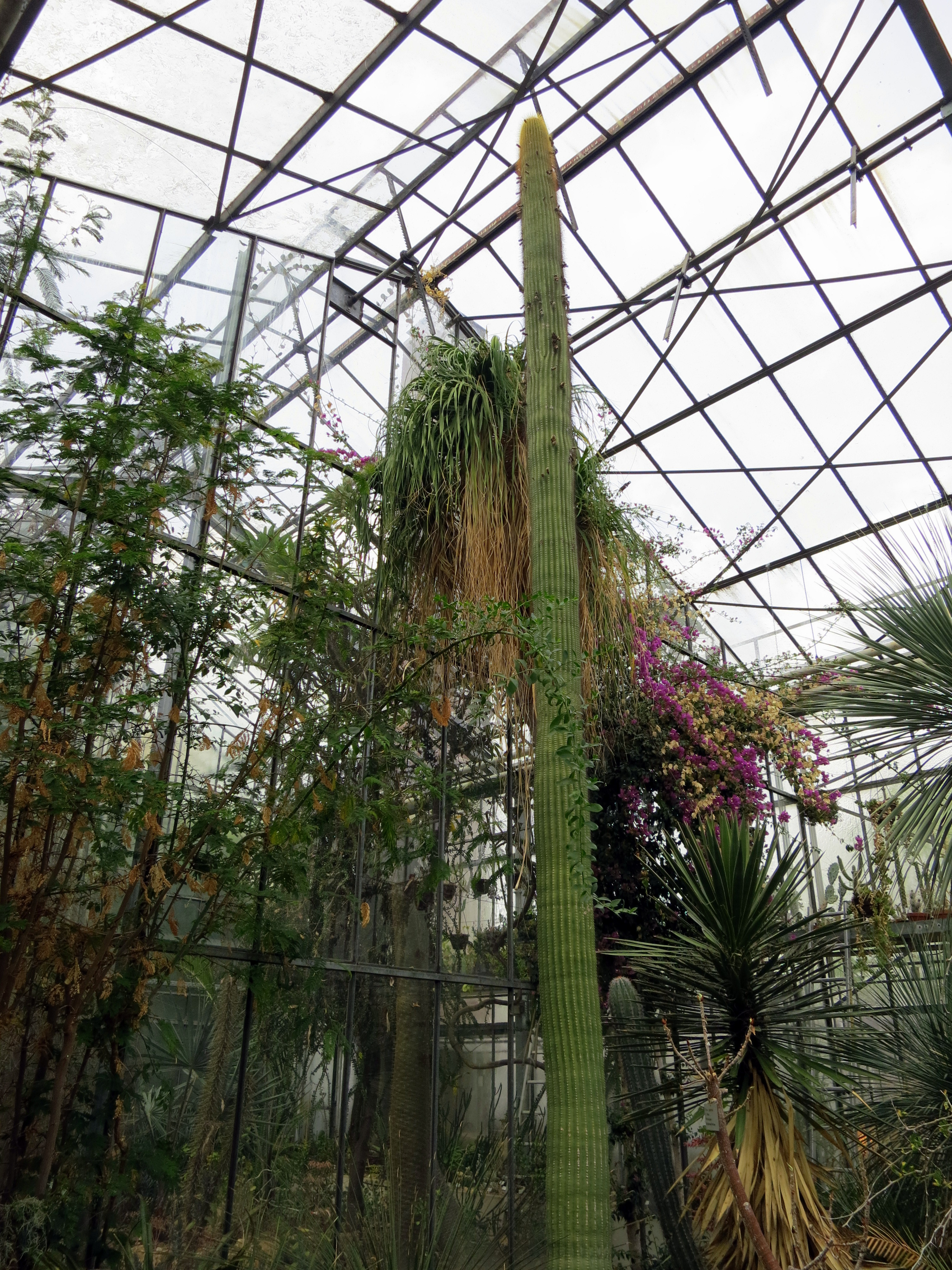
Botanischer Garten Darmstadt Greenhouse

=== City ===
- Mathildenhöhe with the Art Nouveau Museum
  - Wedding Tower (Hochzeitsturm) at Sabaisplatz
  - The former private chapel of the last Tsar of Russia
- State Theatre and Opera House
- Waldspirale Hundertwasser Building
- City Center with Luisenplatz, the Residential Palace and the Market Square
- Hauptbahnhof (Central Train Station) in Art Nouveau style
- Parks
  - Herrngarten Park
  - Botanical Garden (Botanischer Garten)
  - Vortex Garden
  - Park Rosenhöhe (Rose Heights Park) with the Dukal Cemetery
- Porcelain Museum at Schlossgartenplatz
- St. Ludwig Church
- Hessisches Landesmuseum
- Haus der Geschichte (House of History, former Hoftheater)
- Train Museum Kranichstein
- Bessungen old town

=== Region ===
- Odenwald
- Bergstrasse
- Vineyards at Zwingenberg
- Frankenstein Castle
- Messel Pit Fossil Site
- Melibokus

== Notable people ==
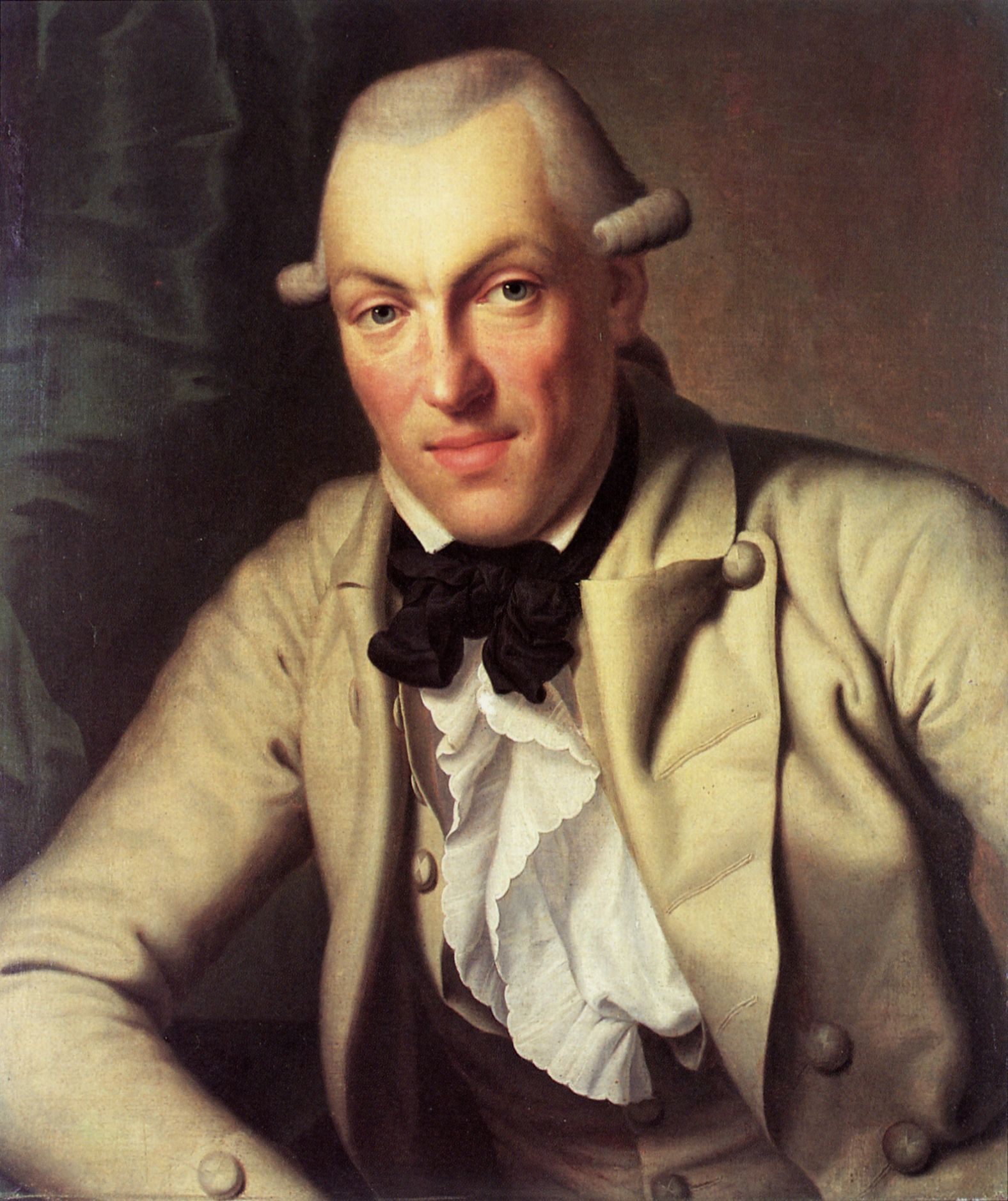
Johann Heinrich Merck, 1770

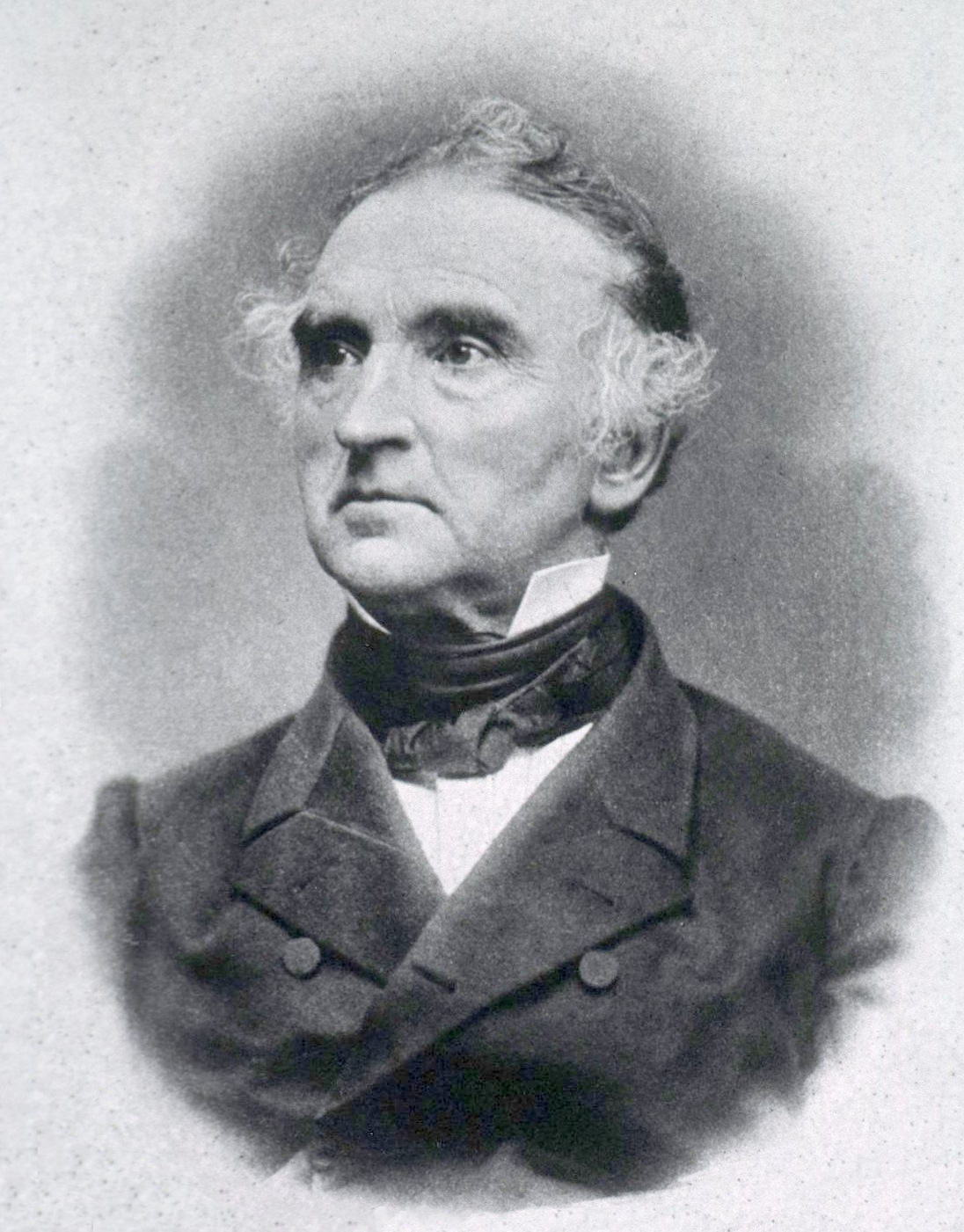
Justus von Liebig, 1866

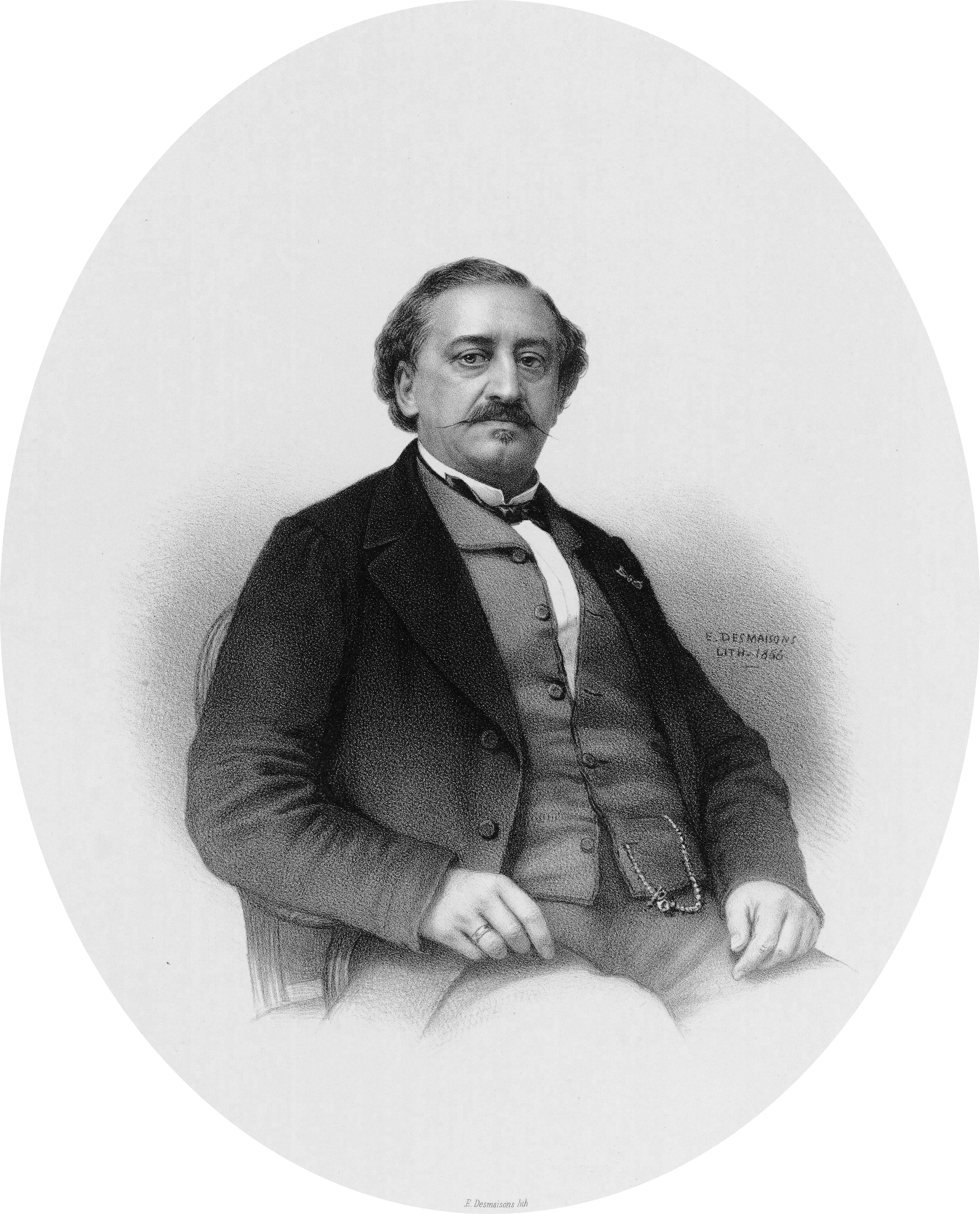
Friedrich von Flotow, 1866

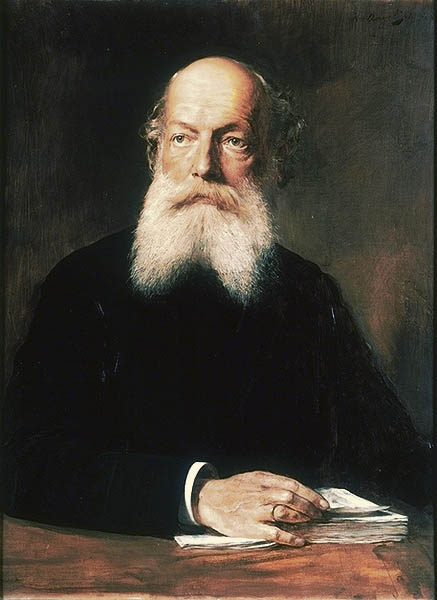
Friedrich August Kekulé, 1890

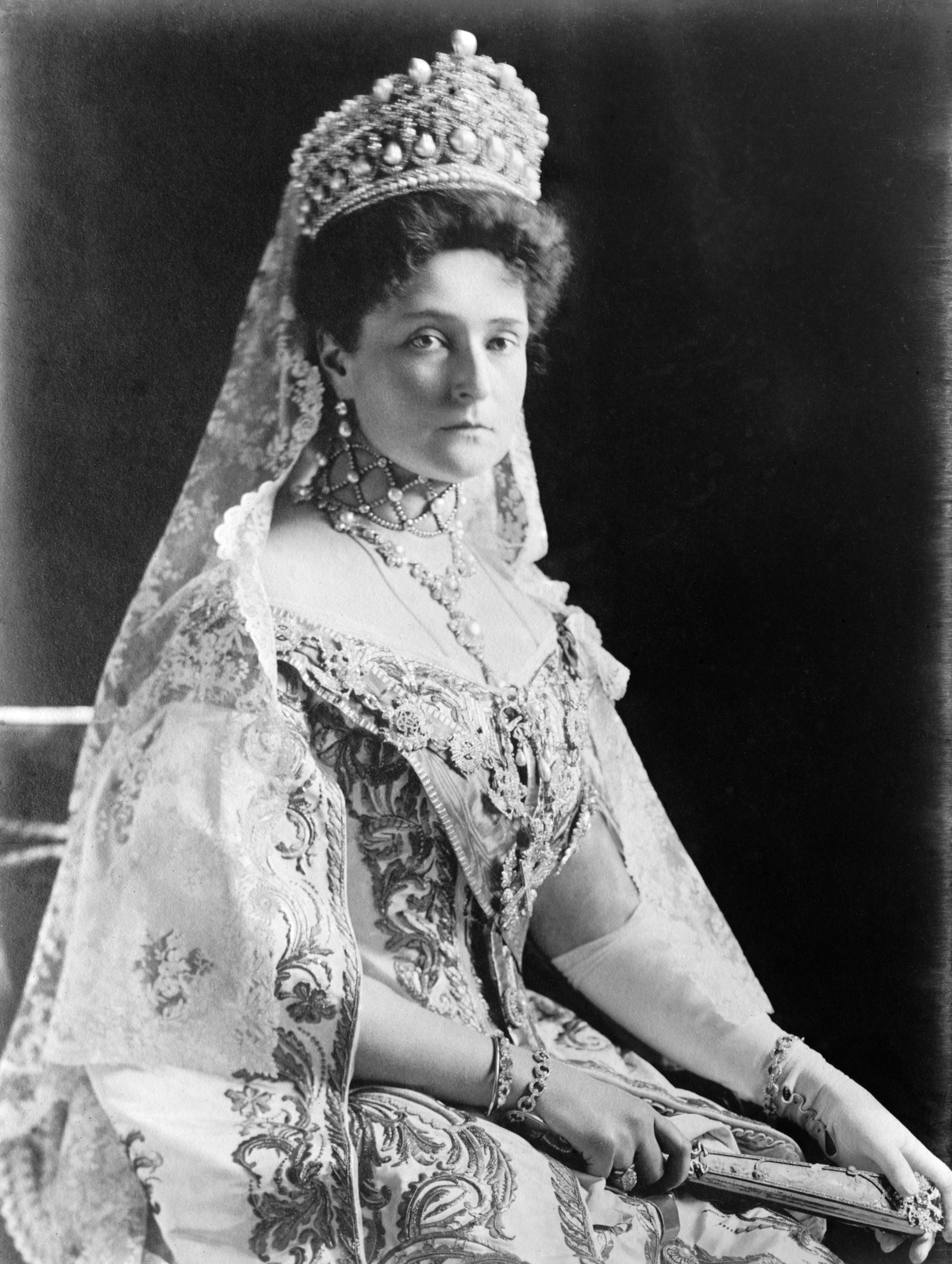
Alexandra Feodorovna, 1908

- Christoph Graupner (1683–1760), composer and Hofkapellmeister (chapel master) at the court of Hesse-Darmstadt from 1711 to 1754
- Johann Jacob Dillenius (1684–1747), botanist
- Johann Heinrich Merck (1741–1791), author and critic
- Johann Christian Felix Baehr (1798–1872), philologist
- Johann Jakob Kaup (1803–1873), naturalist and proponent of natural philosophy
- Justus Freiherr von Liebig (1803–1873), chemist, contributed to agricultural and biological chemistry, founder of organic chemistry
- Georg Gottfried Gervinus (1805–1871), literary and political historian
- Friedrich von Flotow (1812–1883), opera composer, died in Darmstadt
- Georg Büchner (1813–1837), dramatist, poet and revolutionist
- Carl Amand Mangold (1813–1889), composer and conductor
- Ludwig Freiherr von und zu der Tann-Rathsamhausen (1815–1881), Bavarian general
- Ludwig Büchner (1824–1899), philosopher, physiologist and physician; exponent of scientific materialism
- Friedrich August Kekulé (1829–1896), organic chemist; founded the theory of chemical structure
- Eugen Bracht (1842–1921), landscape painter
- Georg von Hertling (1843–1919), politician
- Benjamin Altheimer (1850–1938), American banker and philanthropist
- Friedrich Dingeldey (1859–1939), German mathematician
- Karl Muck (1859–1940), conductor
- Ernest Louis, Grand Duke of Hesse (1868–1937), last Grand Duke of Hesse and by Rhine
- Karl Wolfskehl (1869–1948), poet, editor and translator
- Alexandra Feodorovna (1872–1918), Russian Empress, born as Alix of Hesse, married Tsar Nicholas II of Russia
- Christian Stock (1884–1967), politician
- Anton Köllisch (1888–1916), chemist who first synthesized MDMA (known as "ecstasy")
- Beno Gutenberg (1889–1960), German-American seismologist
- Karl Plagge (1897–1957), Wehrmacht officer, saved Lithuanian Jews from extermination during The Holocaust, Righteous among the Nations
- Karl-Otto Koch (1897–1945), commandant of the Nazi concentration camps at Buchenwald and Sachsenhausen
- Josef Ganz (1898–1967), automotive engineer and pioneer, studied at the Technical University of Darmstadt
- Heinrich von Brentano (1904–1964), Federal Minister for Foreign Affairs from 1955 to 1961
- Hans Möser (1906–1948), Nazi SS concentration camp officer executed for war crimes
- Walter Schmiele (1909–1998), author and translator
- Zinaida Petrovna Ziberova (born 1909), composer
- Arno Schmidt (1914–1979), author and translator
- Hans Stark (1921–1991), head of the admissions detail at Auschwitz-II Birkenau of Auschwitz concentration camp
- Georg Stern (1921–1980), operatic singer
- Karlheinz Stockhausen (1928–2007), leading 20th-century electronic composer
- Günter Strack (1929–1999), actor
- Maciej Łukaszczyk (1934–2014), Polish pianist at the Staatstheater Darmstadt, founder and president of the Chopin organisation, porter of the Polish and German order
- Helmut Markwort (born 1936), journalist
- Annegret Soltau (born 1946), artist
- Cord Meijering (born 1955), Dutch composer
- Christoph Lanz (born 1959), journalist
- Volker Weidermann (born 1969), writer and journalist
- Florika Fink-Hooijer (born 1962), prominent European civil servant
- Nina Gerhard (born 1974), singer
- Karola Obermüller (born 1977), composer
- Björn Bürger (born 1985), operatic baritone
- Annika Zimmermann (born 1989), journalist

=== Sport ===
- Richard von Frankenberg (1922–1973), journalist and racing driver
- Bruno Labbadia (born 1966), football manager and former professional player
- Markus Rühl (born 1972), bodybuilder
- Sascha Bert (born 1975), racing driver
- Andrea Petkovic (born 1987), tennis player

== Twin towns – sister cities ==
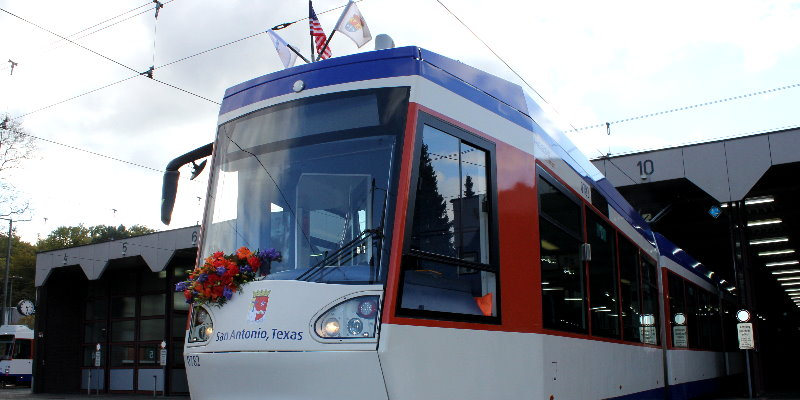
Darmstadt train showcasing the Sister City partnership with San Antonio

Darmstadt is twinned with:

- Alkmaar, Netherlands (1958)
- Brescia, Italy (1991)
- Bursa, Turkey (1971)
- Chesterfield, England, UK (1959)
- Freiberg, Germany (1990)
- Graz, Austria (1968)
- Gstaad (Saanen), Switzerland (1991)
- Gyönk, Hungary (1990)
- Liepāja, Latvia (1993)
- Logroño, Spain (2002)
- Nahariya, Israel (2023)
- Płock, Poland (1988)
- San Antonio, United States (2017)
- Szeged, Hungary (1990)
- Trondheim, Norway (1968)
- Troyes, France (1958)
- Uzhhorod, Ukraine (1992)

== See also ==
- Darmstadt University of Applied Sciences
- Technical University of Darmstadt
- Rhein-Main-Area
