= Bessungen =

- Stadtteil of Darmstadt
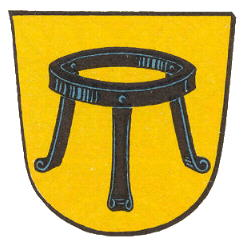
- Coat of arms

- Location of Bessungen within Darmstadt
- Interactive map of Bessungen
- Location within Germany Location within Hesse
- Coordinates: 49°51′28″N 8°39′4″E
- Country: Germany
- State: Hesse
- District: Urban district
- City: Darmstadt

Area
  - Total: 5.53 km^{2} (2.14 sq mi)
- Elevation: 180 m (590 ft)

Population (2019-12-31)
  - Total: 15,172
  - Density: 2,740/km^{2} (7,110/sq mi)
- Time zone: UTC+01:00 (CET)
  - Summer (DST): UTC+02:00 (CEST)
- Postal codes: 64285, 64295
- Dialling codes: 06151

Bessungen is a district in the South of the city of Darmstadt in Hesse.

== History ==
Until 1888, Bessungen was an independent municipality. Its reputation as the oldest part of Darmstadt goes back to Bessungen being first mentioned in 1002. In fact, Bessungen was probably founded by the Alamanni in the 5th century.

== Geography ==
The first foothills of the Odenwald in the south-east result in quite hilly terrain. The Saubachgraben forms the southern boundary of the district. East of Nieder-Ramstädter Straße are the Darmstadt Ostwald and the Lichtwiese, where a campus of the TU Darmstadt is located. To the west to the Heimstättensiedlung and to the north to the city center, the terrain becomes flatter, since these parts of the city are already in the Upper Rhine Plain.

== Key features ==
The last surviving rural courtyard structures sometimes directly meet high and dense block developments from the 19th and 20th centuries. The church forms the core of the village development that stretches along Ludwigshöhstrasse and Niederstrasse. Stately residential buildings from the Wilhelminian period can be found on Heidelberger Strasse and Moosbergstrasse. Bessungen also includes the Paulusviertel to the east. East of the Paulusviertel, bordering the city limits, are the Old Darmstadt Cemetery, the Lichtwiese campus of the Technical University of Darmstadt and extensive sports facilities at the Böllenfalltor. In the west, at Donnersbergring, the change from block to line structure of the 1950s indicates the end of the core area of Bessungen. In the north, Bessungen borders the city center of Darmstadt. The Heidelberger Landstraße leads south to Eberstadt.

The Orangerie and the Prinz-Emil-Garten are two of the bigger parks in Bessungen. The Prinz-Emil-Garten is located in the middle of the district, its features include a little pond and the Prinz-Emil-Palais on a hill. The hill is frequented by locals for sledding in the winter and sunbathing in the summer.

== History ==
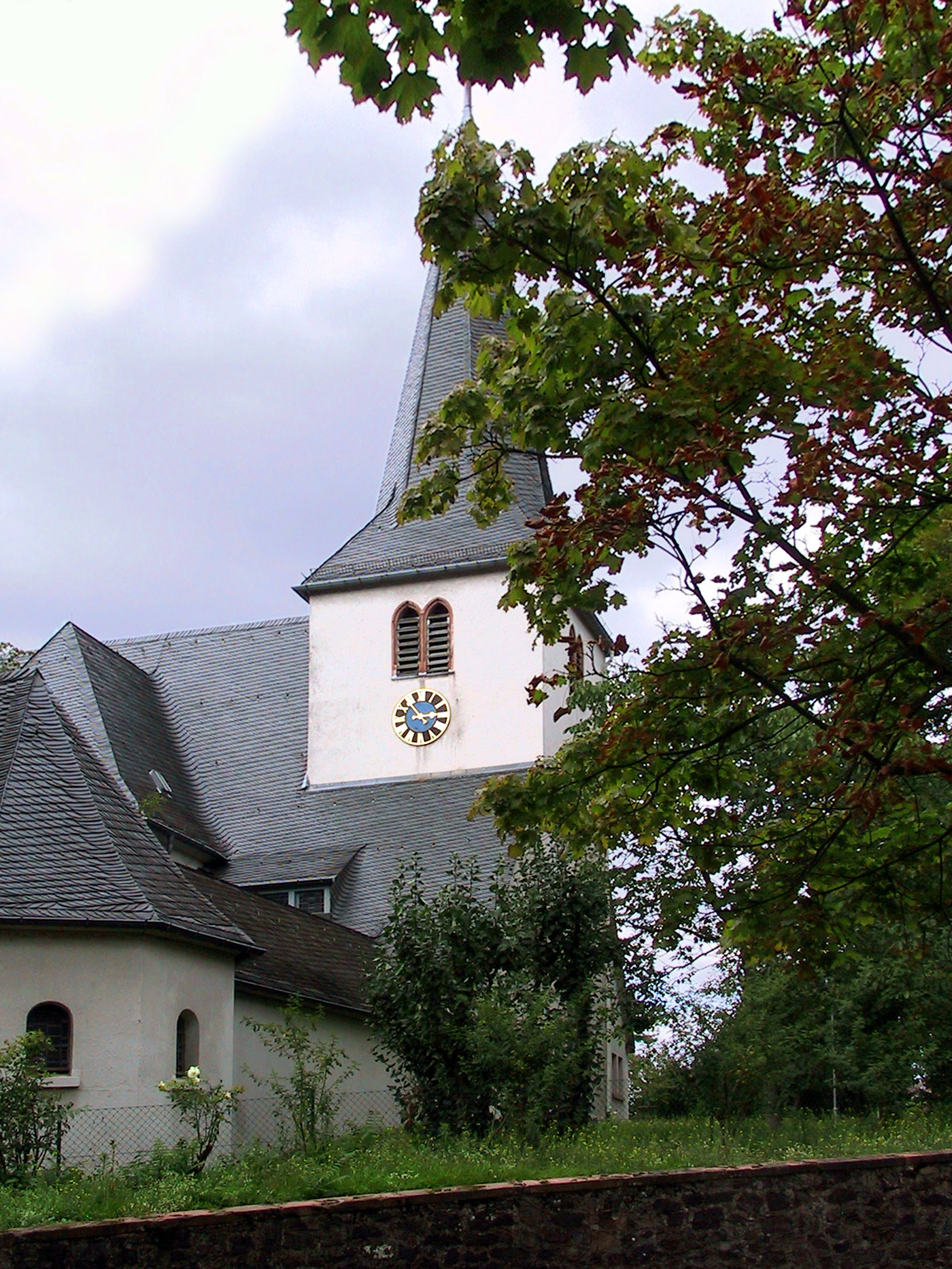
Bessunger Church founded in 1002

Archaeological finds indicate that Bessungen was founded in the 4th or 5th century at the latest. The part of the name "-ingen" or "-ungen" points to an Alemannic origin of the settlement. The name is to be interpreted as "among the people of Bezzo", whereby Bezzo (modified form of Bernhard) is probably an Alemannic noble whose followers settled in that village. Medieval Bessungen developed at the crossroads of old Roman roads. Bessungen was first mentioned in a document on June 10, 1002: In a document by Emperor Henry II, Bessungen (old: Bezcingon), then belonging to the royal court of Gerau, was granted to the diocese of Worms, in 1009 to the diocese of Bamberg and finally on 21 June 1013 to the Diocese of Würzburg. In 1479, Bessungen was inherited by the Landgraviate of Hesse. Bessungen barely survived the Thirty Years' War, and in 1646 it only had 30 inhabitants. In January 1635, the city was almost completely burned down by French troops. The surviving inhabitants fled behind the city walls of Darmstadt, where many fell victim to the plague. Only with the increasing importance of the neighboring Darmstadt did Bessungen experience a certain boom at the beginning of the 18th century. The village grew as court officials and servants moved in. At the beginning of the 19th century, Darmstadt became the center of the Grand Duchy of Hesse-Darmstadt, which led to a major expansion of the city area. By 1875 at the latest, Darmstadt and Bessungen had finally grown together. On April 1, 1888, after lengthy negotiations, Bessungen was incorporated into Darmstadt. Bessungen was largely spared from the bombings of World War II.

Bessungen does not have its own local council. All matters relating to the district are dealt with in the city parliament and magistrate of the city of Darmstadt. However, all major parties have local chapters.

== Coat of arms ==
The coat of arms shows the Sacrificial tripod, a court seat, in front of a yellow background.

== Orangerie ==
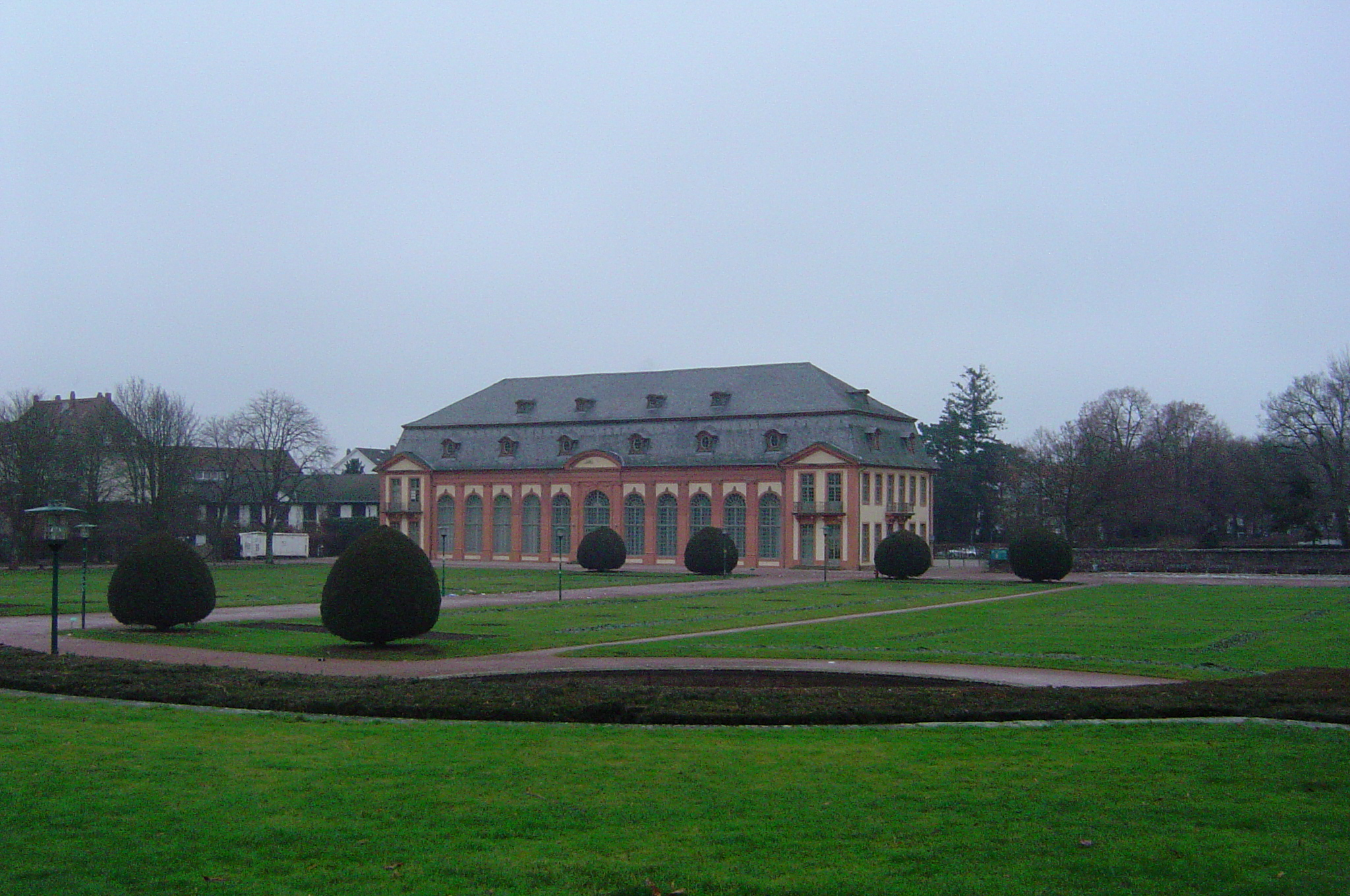
Orangerie in Darmstadt – southern façade

The Orangerie was built from 1719 to 1721. The plans of architect Louis Remy de la Fosse could not be fully realized because of financial difficulties following a great fire in the Residential Palace Darmstadt. The financial future of the Orangerie was secured with 20 Golden Delicious apple trees and 60 Sardinia orange trees. The small Orangerie palace, which temporarily served as a theater after World War II, was originally a winter shelter for the orange trees in the park. Today the building is used for concerts and conferences. The adjoining park was designed by court gardener Johann Kaspar Ehret. The baroque complex is arranged symmetrically and consists of lawns, fountains and avenues. Even today, the tropical fruits can still be admired in summer.

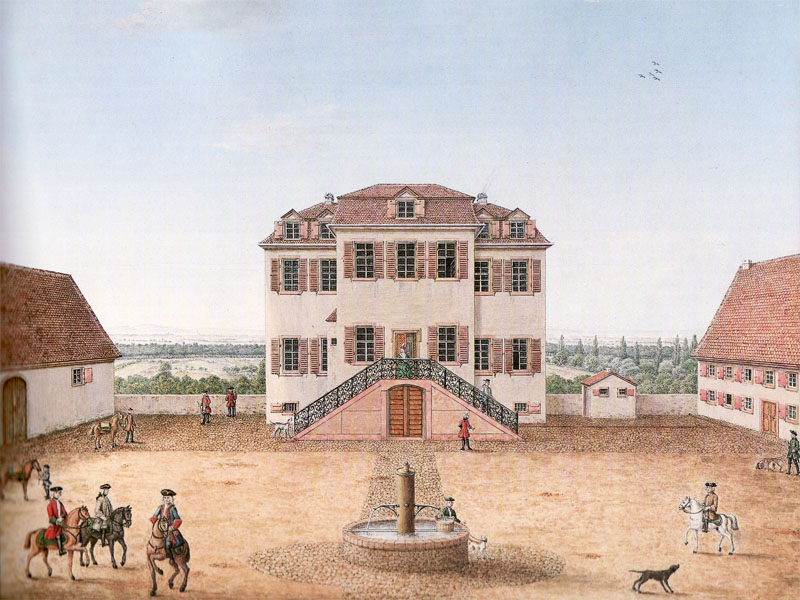
Bessunger Jagdhof und Kavaliershaus in 1872

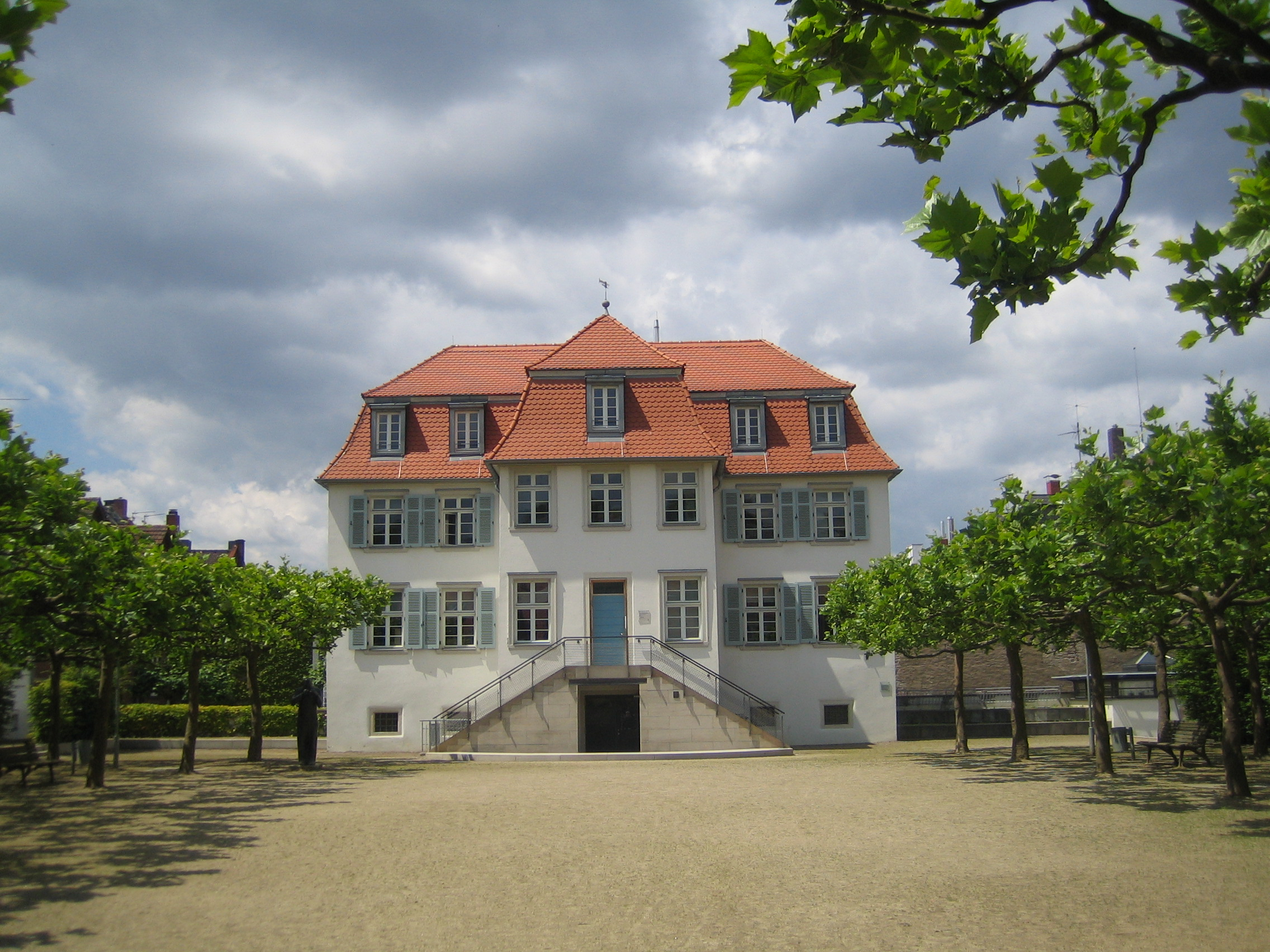
Bessunger Jagdhof und Kavaliershaus 2009

== Boroughs of Darmstadt ==
Darmstadt has 9 official 'Stadtteile' (boroughs). These are, alphabetically:

- Darmstadt-Arheilgen
- Darmstadt-Bessungen
- Darmstadt-Eberstadt
- Darmstadt-Kranichstein
- Darmstadt-Mitte ('Central')
- Darmstadt-Nord ('North')
- Darmstadt-Ost ('East')
- Darmstadt-West ('West')
- Darmstadt-Wixhausen
