= Kranichstein =

- Stadtteil of Darmstadt
- Location of Kranichstein within Darmstadt
- Interactive map of Kranichstein
- Location within Germany Location within Hesse
- Coordinates: 49°53′54″N 8°40′37″E
- Country: Germany
- State: Hesse
- Admin. region: Darmstadt
- District: Urban district
- City: Darmstadt

Area
  - Total: 6.555 km^{2} (2.531 sq mi)
- Elevation: 140 m (460 ft)

Population (2019-12-31)
  - Total: 12,043
  - Density: 1,837/km^{2} (4,758/sq mi)
- Time zone: UTC+01:00 (CET)
  - Summer (DST): UTC+02:00 (CEST)
- Postal codes: 64289
- Dialling codes: 06151
- Website: www.darmstadt.de

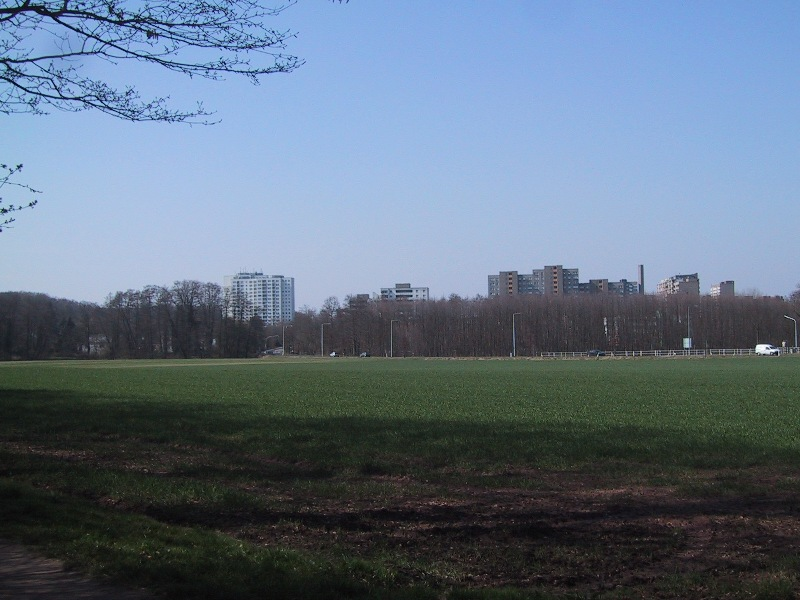
Kranichstein

Kranichstein is a district in the German city of Darmstadt. Housing construction in the area started in the 1960s and it now also has a number of residential high-rises. The district is often referred to as Darmstadt-Kranichstein.

== Geographical location ==
Kranichstein is located in the northeast of Darmstadt. It borders Darmstadt-Wixhausen in the north, Darmstadt-Ost in the southeast, Darmstadt-Nord in the southwest and Darmstadt-Arheilgen in the west.

== History ==
Due to the close geographic location to Arheilgen, the prehistoric history is certainly to be regarded as the same.

=== Middle Ages ===
On May 6, 1399, the first mention of the Einsiedel-Rod on Messeler Weg appeared, which was later named Kranich-Rod or Kranich-Rotth, after its owner Henne Cranich zu Dirmstein, derived from the German word for clearing "Rodung". Kranichstein is also the name of Jagdschloss Kranichstein. It was originally built in 1578 for Landgrave Georg I of Hesse-Darmstadt. The palace is one of the few preserved baroque hunters' courtyards in Germany. Today the facility houses a hunting museum and a hotel with restaurant. Landgrave Ernst Ludwig (1667–1739) and Louis VIII (1691–1768) also made use of the Kranichstein hunting lodge.

=== Modern times ===
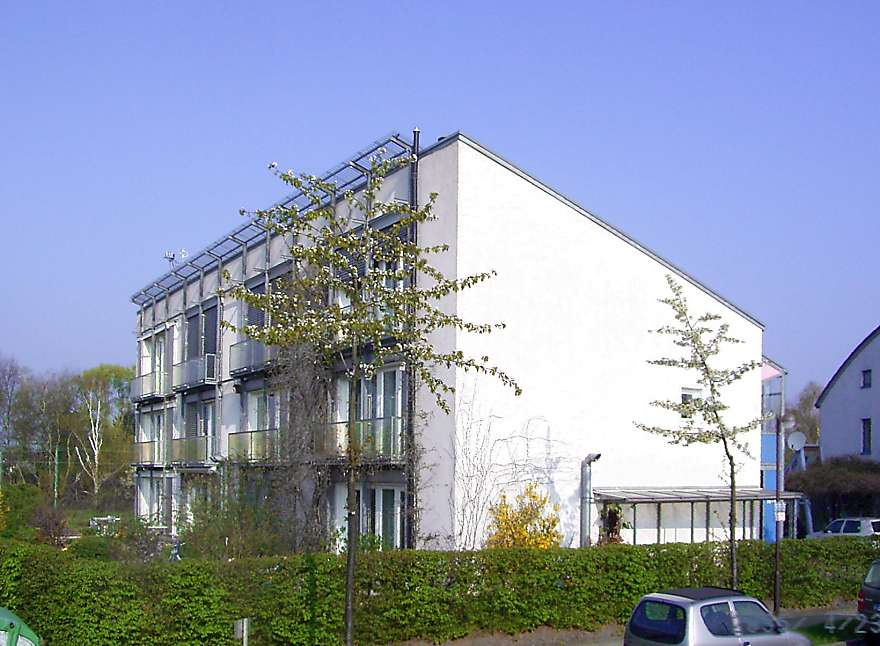
A building based on the passive house concept in Kranichstein

In May 1968, the “Neu-Kranichstein” urban development project, which was relatively large for Darmstadt, was started; the designs came from Ernst May. The design provided for a city expansion for 18,000 residents in the form of a forest satellite. Of the four planned construction phases, only the smallest was initially implemented. It is named after the nearby hunting lodge, the former summer residence of the Darmstadt landgraves and grand dukes. From the beginning, the overall planning included the construction of the Bürgerpark with artificial hills and several ponds that were created in the former clay pits, as well as Lake Brentano. Kranichstein is known for its passive houses, (Passivhaus in German) this refers to the voluntary standard for energy efficiency in a building, reducing its ecological footprint

== Transportation ==
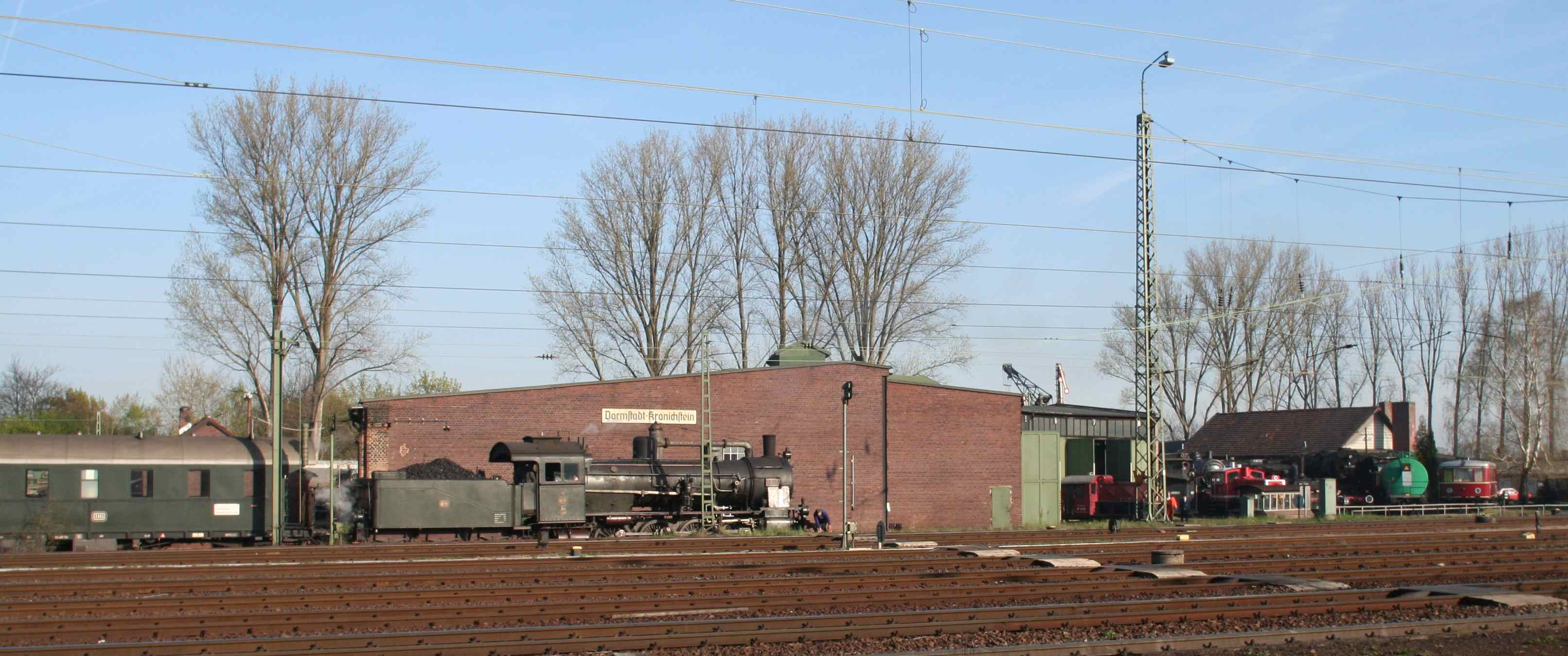
The Darmstadt-Kranichstein Railway Museum

Kranichstein is served by lines 4 and 5 of the Darmstadt tram network, linking the district to central Darmstadt. Bus line H also runs to central Darmstadt and bus line A connects Kranichstein to Arheilgen

Darmstadt-Kranichstein railway station is on the Rhine-Main Railway and has services to Darmstadt main station, Wiesbaden Hauptbahnhof and Mainz Hauptbahnhof on regional train line RB75.

Tram lines 4, 5 and bus line A also serve the Kranichstein rail stop.

Darmstadt-Kranichstein Railway Museum is a large railway museum with some operational historical steam locomotives.

== Boroughs of Darmstadt ==
Darmstadt has 9 official 'Stadtteile' (boroughs). These are, alphabetically:

- Darmstadt-Arheilgen
- Darmstadt-Bessungen
- Darmstadt-Eberstadt
- Darmstadt-Kranichstein
- Darmstadt-Mitte ('Central')
- Darmstadt-Nord ('North')
- Darmstadt-Ost ('East')
- Darmstadt-West ('West')
- Darmstadt-Wixhausen
