= Trams in Darmstadt =

Tram system in Darmstadt, Germany

Coordinates: 49°52′N 08°39′E

Darmstadt tramway network
- Straßenbahn Darmstadt
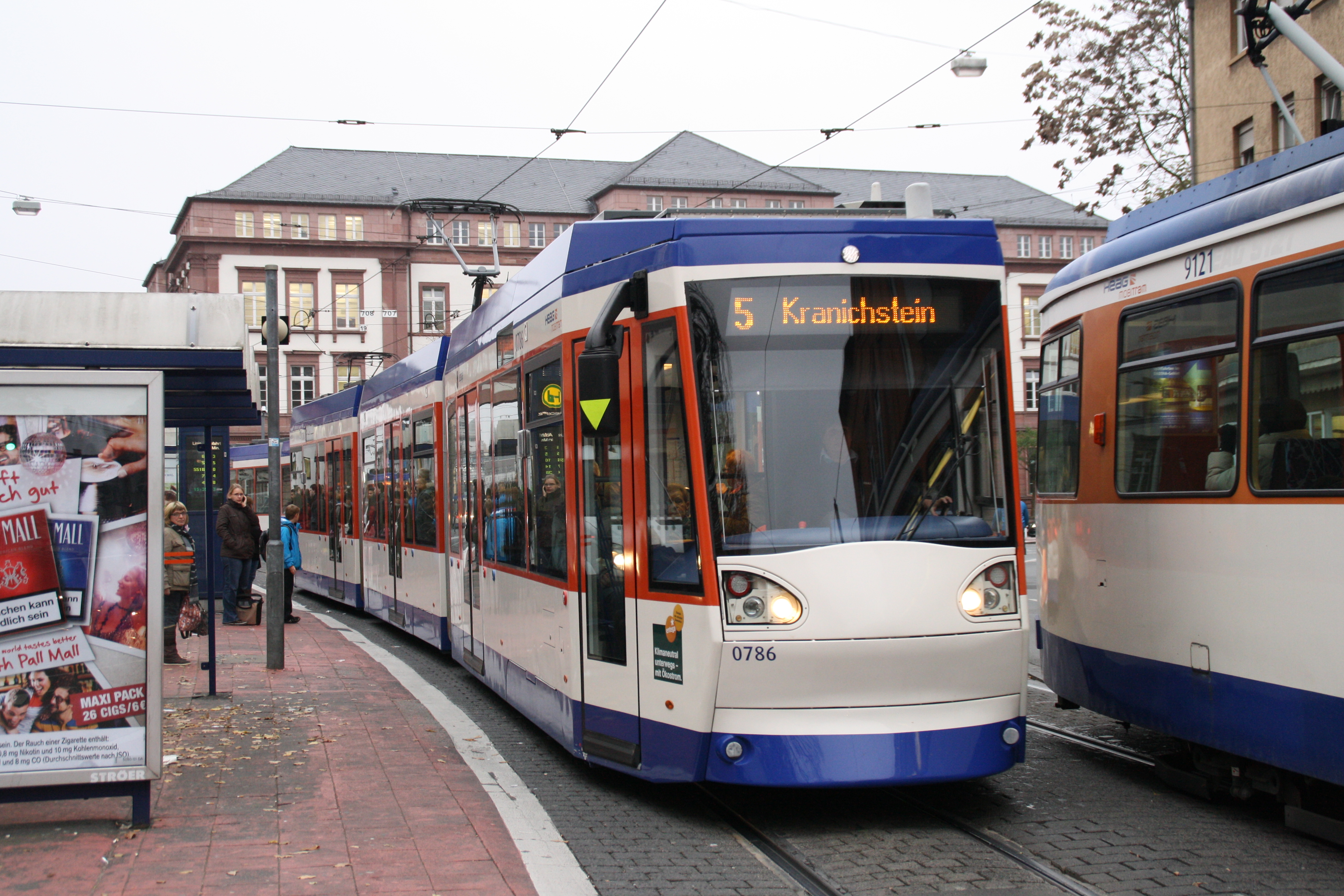
- Tram at Willy-Brandt-Platz

Operation
- Locale: Darmstadt, Hesse, Germany

Statistics
Steam tram era: 1886–1922
- Status: Converted to electric traction
- Operators: Herrmann Bachstein consortium; (1886–1895); Süddeutsche Eisenbahn-Gesellschaft (SEG); (1895–1912); Hessische Eisenbahn-Aktiengesellschaft (HEAG; (1912–1922)
- Propulsion system: Steam
Electric tram era: since 1897
- Status: Operational
- Lines: 10
- Operators: Siemens & Halske; (1897); City of Darmstadt; (1898–1912); HEAG; (since 1912)
- Track gauge: 1,000 mm (3 ft 3 3/8 in)
- Propulsion system: Electricity
- Stock: 48 (including 38 low-floor trams)
- Track length (total): 92 km (57 mi)
- Route length: 42 km (26 mi)
- Stops: 164
- Network map, 2024
- Website: HEAG mobilo

The Darmstadt tram network is a tram system which is the backbone of public transport in Darmstadt, Germany. There are ten lines running on a 42 kilometres (26 mi) long network with four main routes, including an interurban route south from Eberstadt to Alsbach. As of 2019 the system served 164 stops, including 126 barrier-free stops. The system is operated by HEAG mobilo, and is an integral part of the Rhein-Main-Verkehrsverbund (RMV), the public transit authority of the Rhein-Main-Area.

== History ==
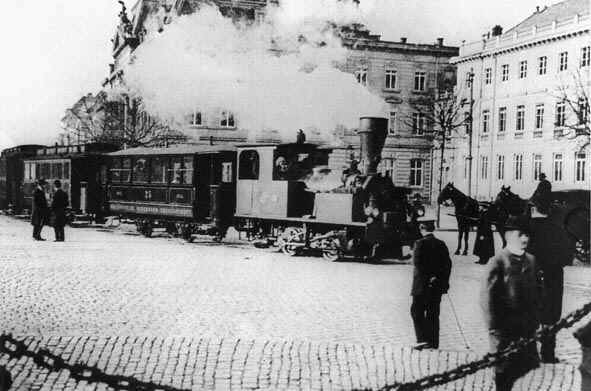
Steam tram in Luisenplatz, 1899

Trams have operated continuously in Darmstadt since 30 August 1886, with the opening of two steam tram lines from the city centre and to Griesheim and Eberstadt. A third line, to Arheilgen, opened on 30 April 1890. The steam tram lines were originally built and operated by a private consortium led by the railway entrepreneur Hermann Bachstein, before being transferred to the newly formed Süddeutsche-Eisenbahn-Gesellchaft on 11 February 1895.

The steam trams did not serve the narrow streets of the city centre so in 1895 the city decided to also build an electric tramway. A concession to build and operate this was awarded to Siemens & Halske and the first two lines opened on 23 November 1897, linking the Hauptbahnhof (main railway station) to Böllenfalltor and Taunusstraße to Hermannstraße. A third line between Fasanerie and Heidelberger Straße opened in 1903.

The steam and electric routes were amalgamated into the Hessische Eisenbahn-Aktiengesellschaft (HEAG) in 1912, which has operated the network since then. A new line to Darmstadt Ostbahnhof (Darmstadt East railway station) opened on 1 October 1913 and the steam tram lines were electrified. The last steam service ran to Eberstadt in 1914 and the lines to Griesheim and Arheilgen were electrified between 1924 and 1926. During the 1920s the network expanded with lines to Oberwaldhaus, Liebfrauenstraße, Heinheimer Straße and Rodensteinweg.

While some older lines were closed, including those to Oberwaldhaus in 1970 and Ostbahnhof in 1986, new sections were built following the development of new residential areas. A 1.6 kilometres (0.99 mi) extension of the southern line from Jugenheim to Alsbach opened on 18 August 1979, running partly on reserved track and partly on the route of a former railway line. The branch to Kranichstein opened in 2003, there were short extensions in Alsbach in 2008 and Arheilgen in 2011, and most recently a line to the Technische Universität Darmstadt campus at Lichtwiese opened in 2022. Since the 1990s the existing network has also been gradually been modernised. All lines (except for line 3) have since been less of a classical tram system and more of a light rail system with a separate right-of-way and stops with platforms level with the tram floors.

== Lines ==
The central hub of the Darmstadt tram network is the Luisenplatz, at which eight of Darmstadt's ten tram lines stop. At the Hauptbahnhof railway station the tram system and the Rhine-Main S-Bahn meet. On the main routes the hours of operation are usually from around 5:00 am until 1:00 am. As of 2024 the network is made up of the following lines:

| Line | Route | Stops | Notes |
|---|---|---|---|
| 1 | Hauptbahnhof ↔ Rhein-/Neckarstr. ↔ Eberstadt | 19 | |
| 2 | Hauptbahnhof ↔ Luisenplatz ↔ TU Darmstadt, Lichtwiese campus | 11 | |
| 3 | Hauptbahnhof ↔ Willy-Brandt-Platz ↔ Luisenplatz ↔ Lichtenbergschule | 15 | |
| 4 | Griesheim ↔ Luisenplatz ↔ Kranichstein | 25 | Mondays to Fridays, except early morning and late evening |
| 4 | Hauptbahnhof ↔ Luisenplatz ↔ Kranichstein | 16 | Saturdays, Sundays and Holidays; Mondays to Fridays only early morning and late evening |
| 5 | Böllenfalltor ↔ Luisenplatz ↔ Kranichstein | 20 | |
| 6 | Arheilgen ↔ Luisenplatz ↔ Eberstadt ↔ Alsbach (Express line) | 30 | Outside peak hours every second tram terminates in Eberstadt; Express line – does not call at all stops |
| 7 | Lichtenbergschule ↔ Luisenplatz ↔ Eberstadt | 26 | |
| 8 | Arheilgen ↔ Luisenplatz ↔ Eberstadt ↔ Alsbach | 38 | |
| 9 | Griesheim ↔ Luisenplatz ↔ Böllenfalltor | 20 | |
| 10 | Griesheim ↔ Hauptbahnhof (Express line) | 8 | Express line – does not call at all stops |

On all main routes at least a 15 minute frequency is offered all day, with the ten lines coordinated so that in peak hours almost all routes (except the section between Eberstadt and Alsbach) have at least a 10 minute frequency. In some places parallel bus routes also offer a higher frequency service.

== Future expansion ==
An expansion of the tram network is planned to serve new developments in the Ludwigshöhviertel, on land formerly used by the US Military. The new line will link the end of the current line 3 at Lichtenbergschule to the route to Eberstadt at Heidelberger Straße, with two intermediate stops. Linking the two existing routes will also provide options for diversions in case of disruption.

== Rolling stock ==
In 2019 the fleet consisted of 48 trams (ten high-floor ST12, 20 low-floor ST13 and 18 low-floor ST14) and 30 low-floor SB9 trailers. 14 new Stadler-built low-floor trams were ordered in January 2020. The new ST15 trams are 43 m long, unidirectional vehicle with five sections and were the first order for the Stadler TINA model. A follow-on order for a further 11 trams was announced in June 2021 to allow the last high-floor ST12 trams to be withdrawn. The first of the new ST15 trams entered test service with passengers in October 2023.

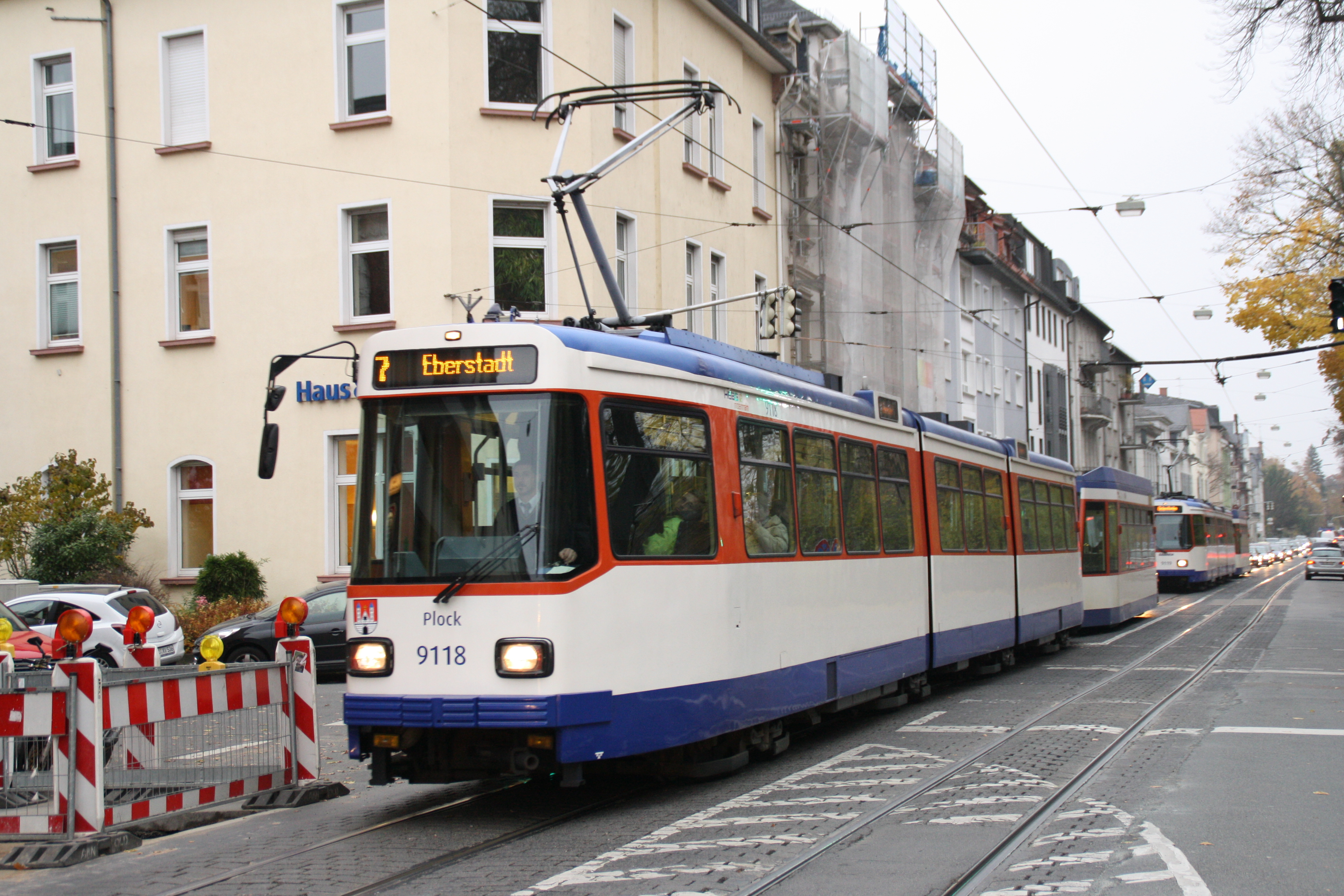
High-floor ST12 tram

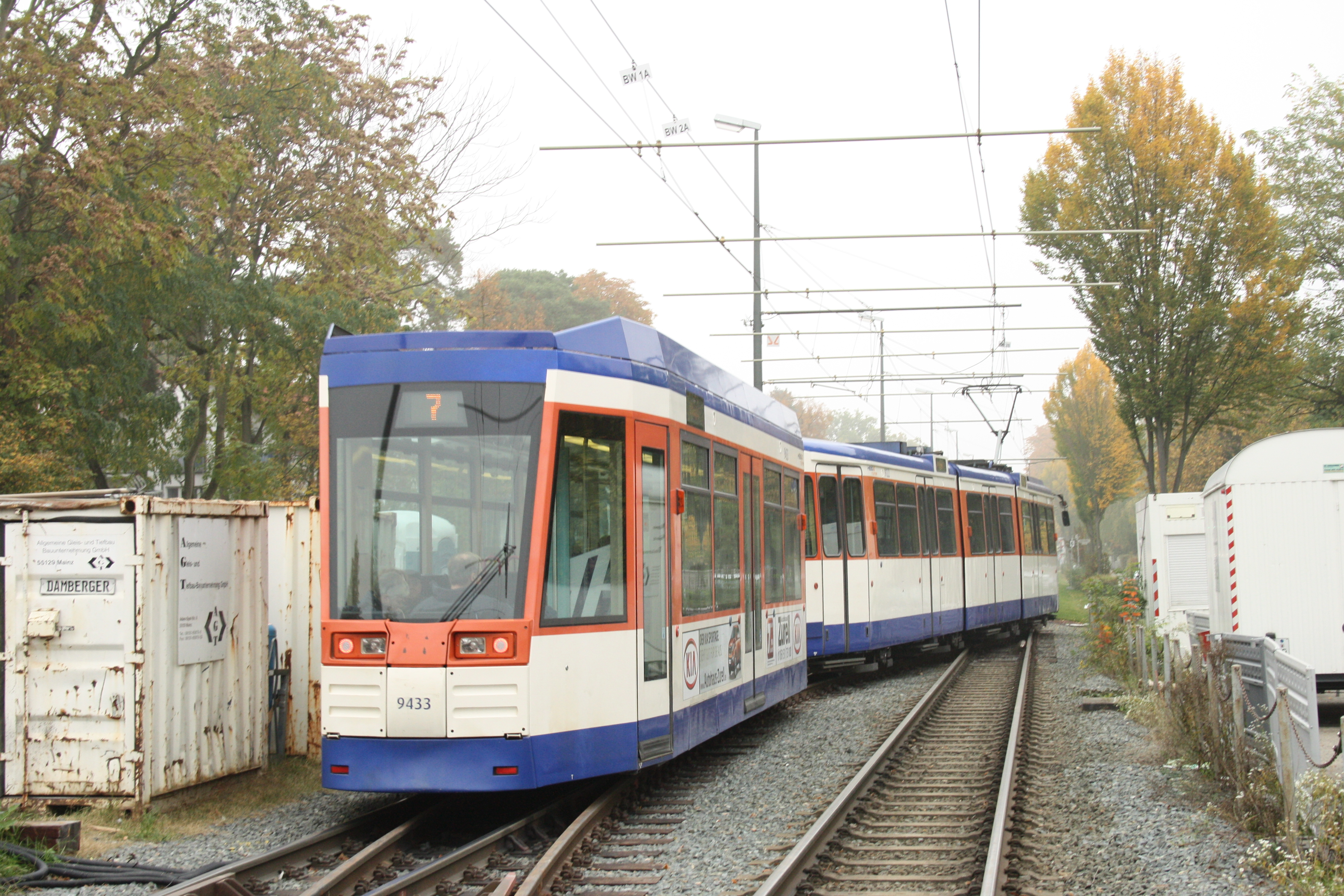
SB9 trailer

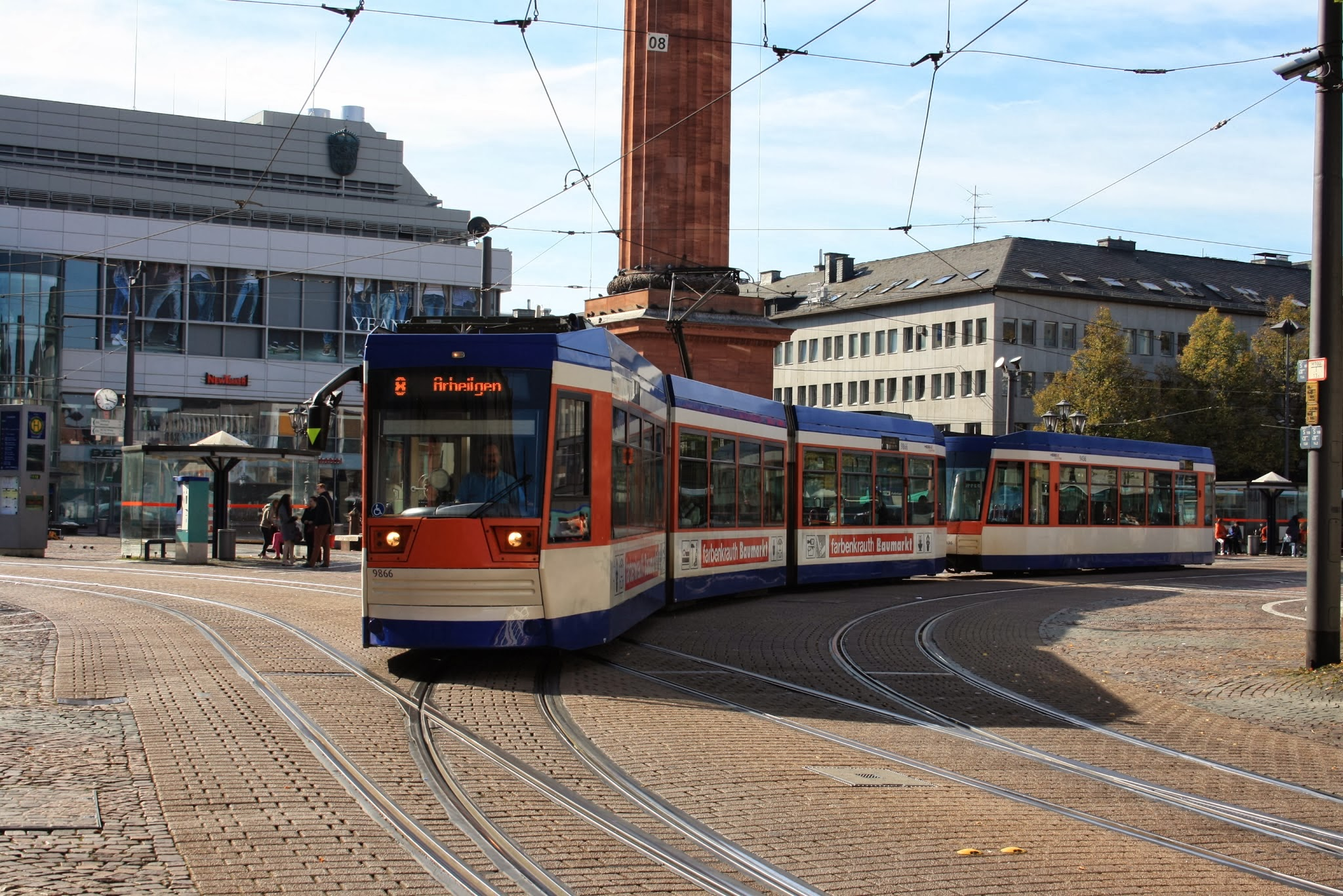
ST13 tram, with SB9 trailer

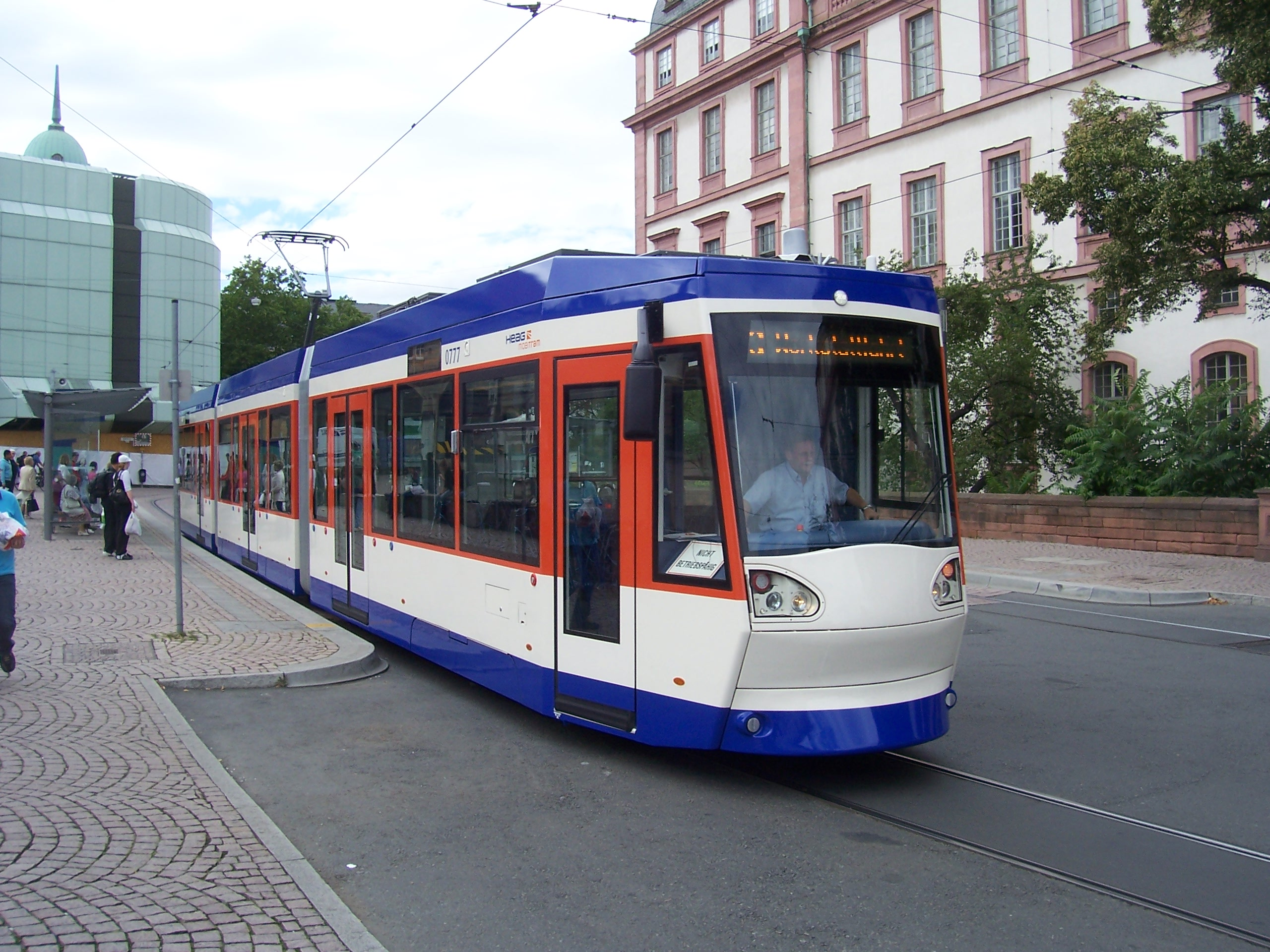
ST14 tram

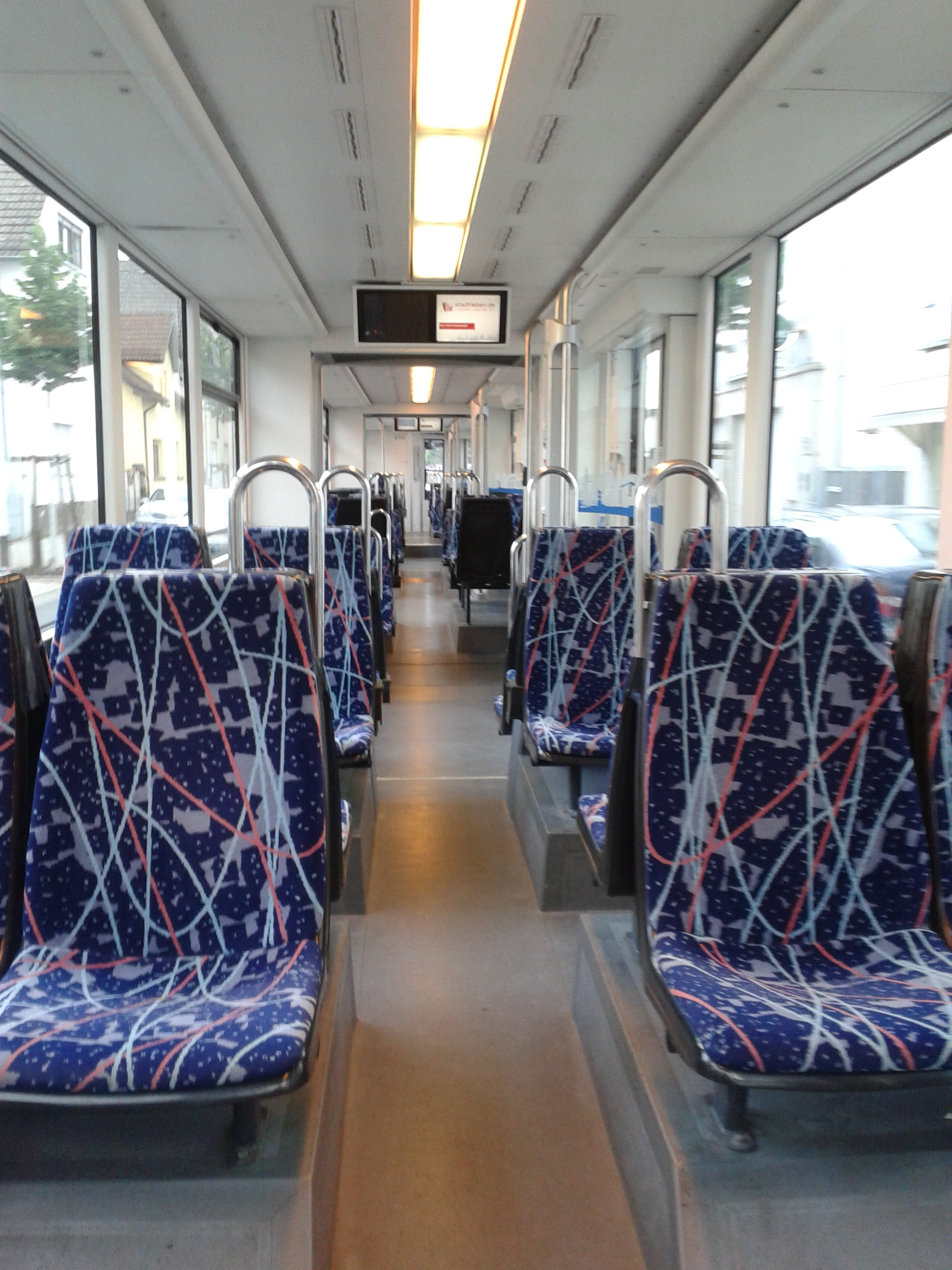
ST14 interior

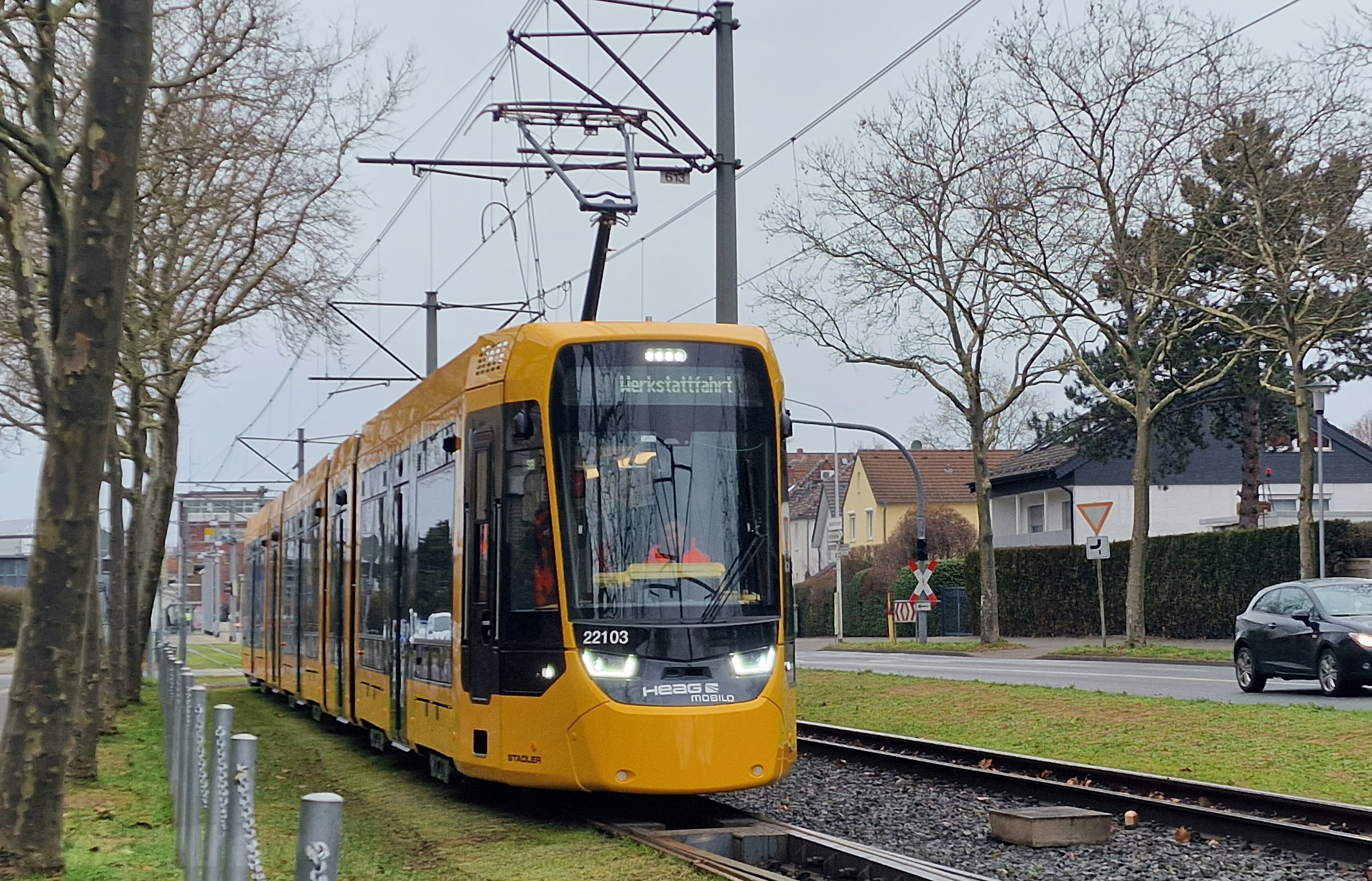
Stadler Tina ST15 tram

== Steam tram ==
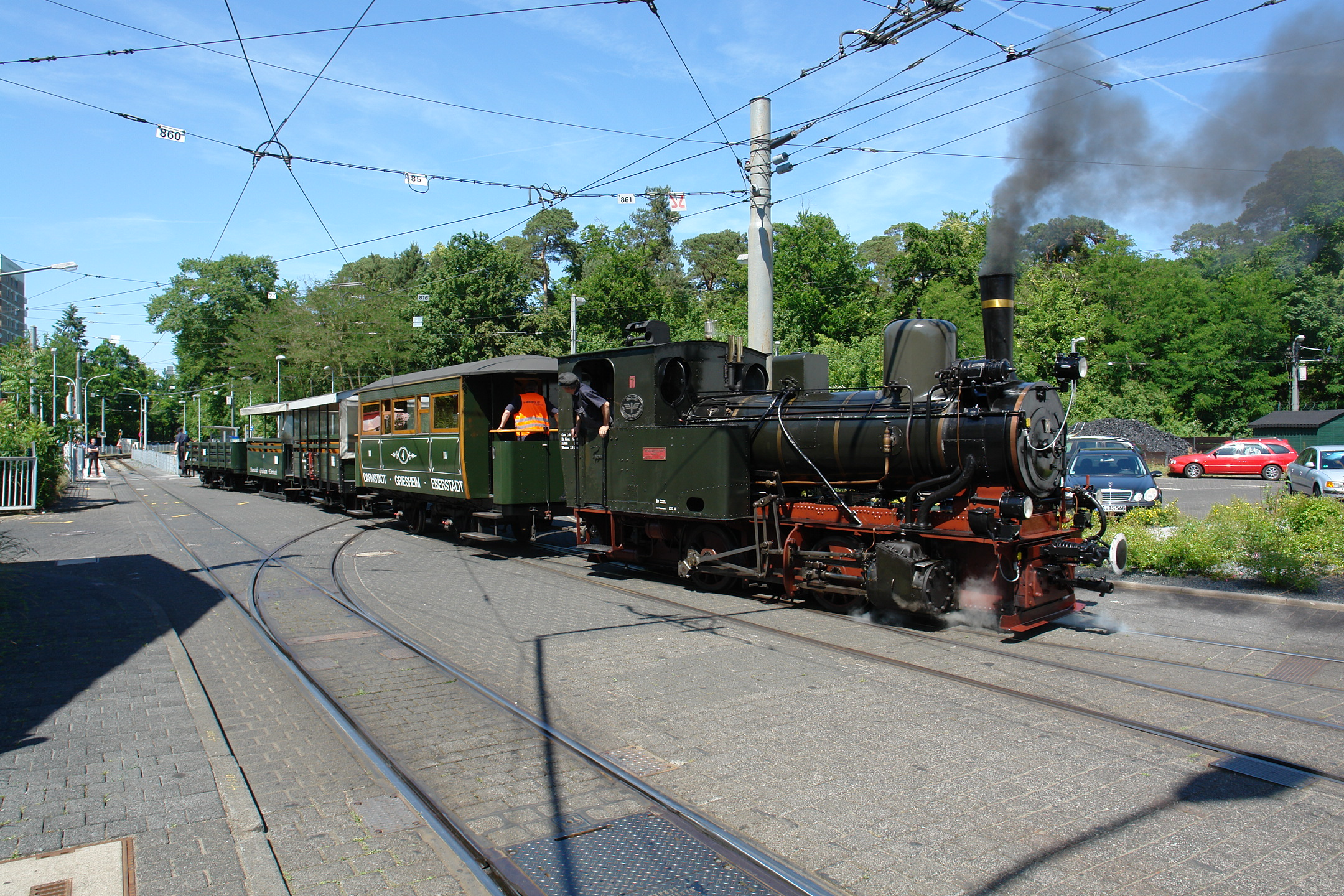
Feuriger Elias at Frankenstein tram stop in Eberstadt

Since 1997 a steam tram service, known as Feuriger Elias, has been operated by the ARGE Historische HEAG-Fahrzeuge (Working group for historic HEAG vehicles). The tram runs on selected weekends and holidays in May, June and September on two routes, between Frankenstein in Eberstadt and Alsbach, or between Griesheim and Darmstadt Schloss.

=== Rolling stock ===
The 0-4-0T locomotive No. 7 was built in 1919 for industrial use by Henschel & Son (works number 17218). It was originally 900 mm (2 ft 11 7/16 in) gauge and was re-gauged for use in Darmstadt.

The train usually comprises four carriages: one closed carriage, two open carriages with roofs and one fully-open carriage. The open carriage (No. 301) is the only remaining vehicle from the original steam tramway in Darmstadt. The other three carriages are reconstructions built on goods wagon chassis.

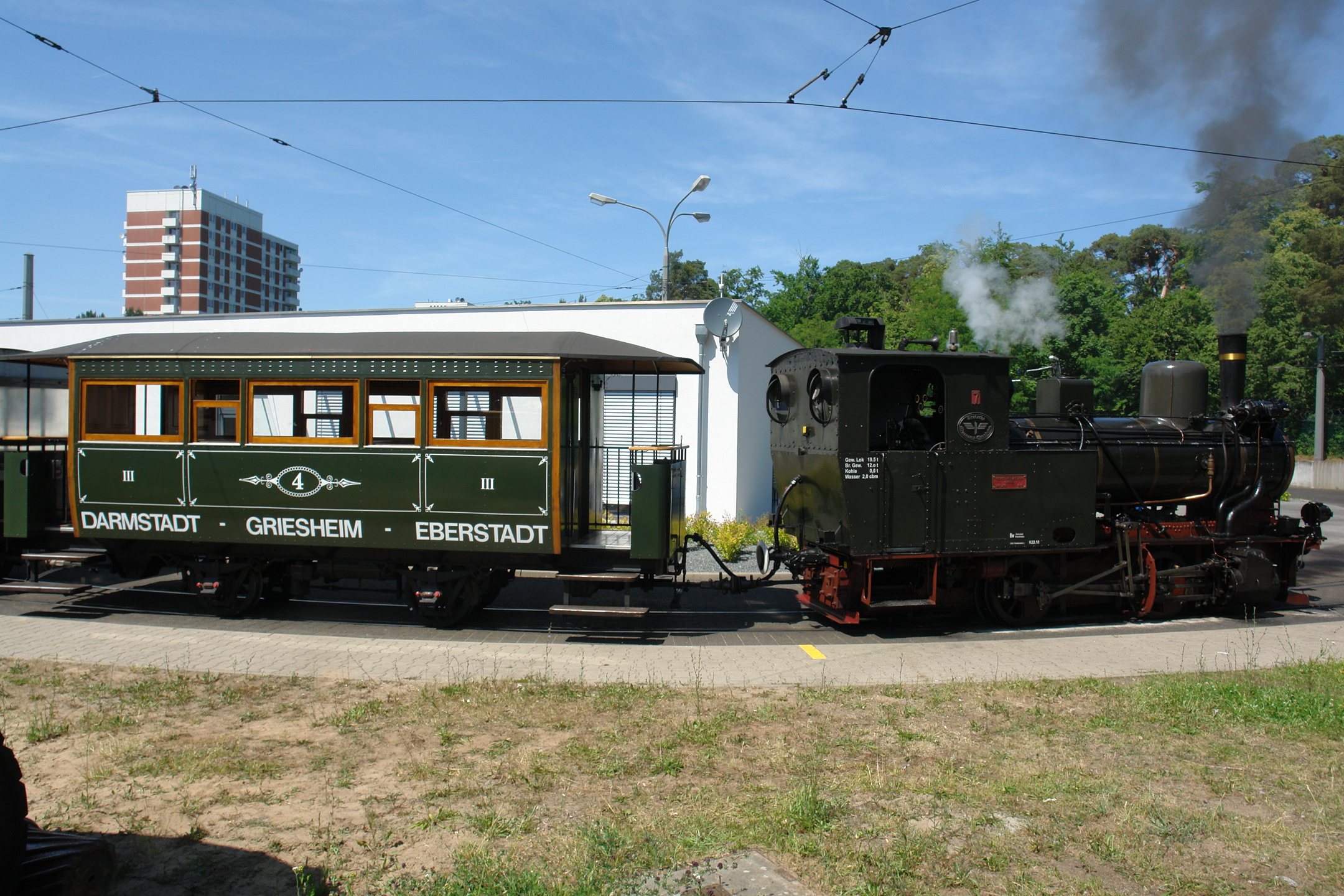
Locomotive No. 7 and carriage No. 4

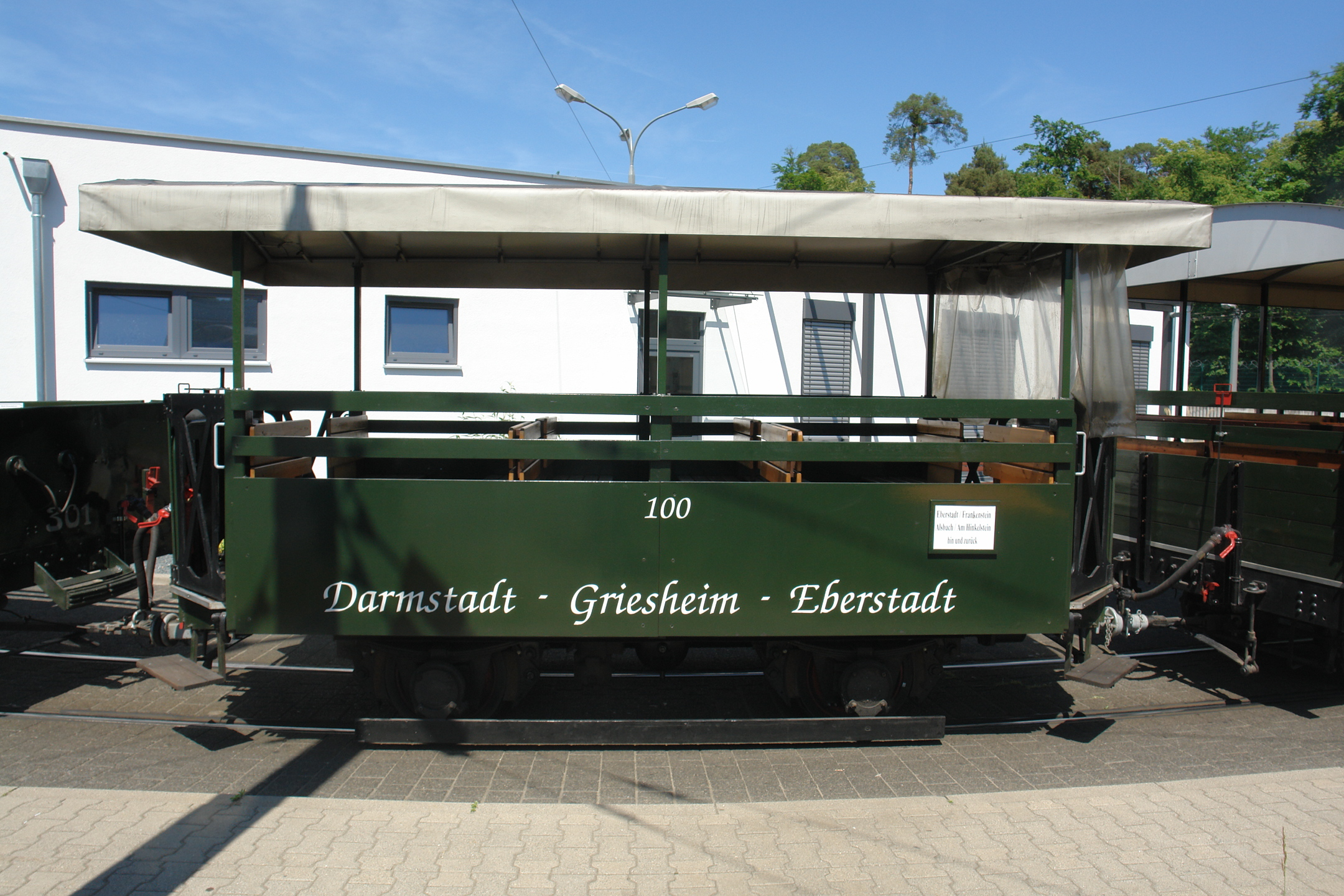
Carriage No. 100

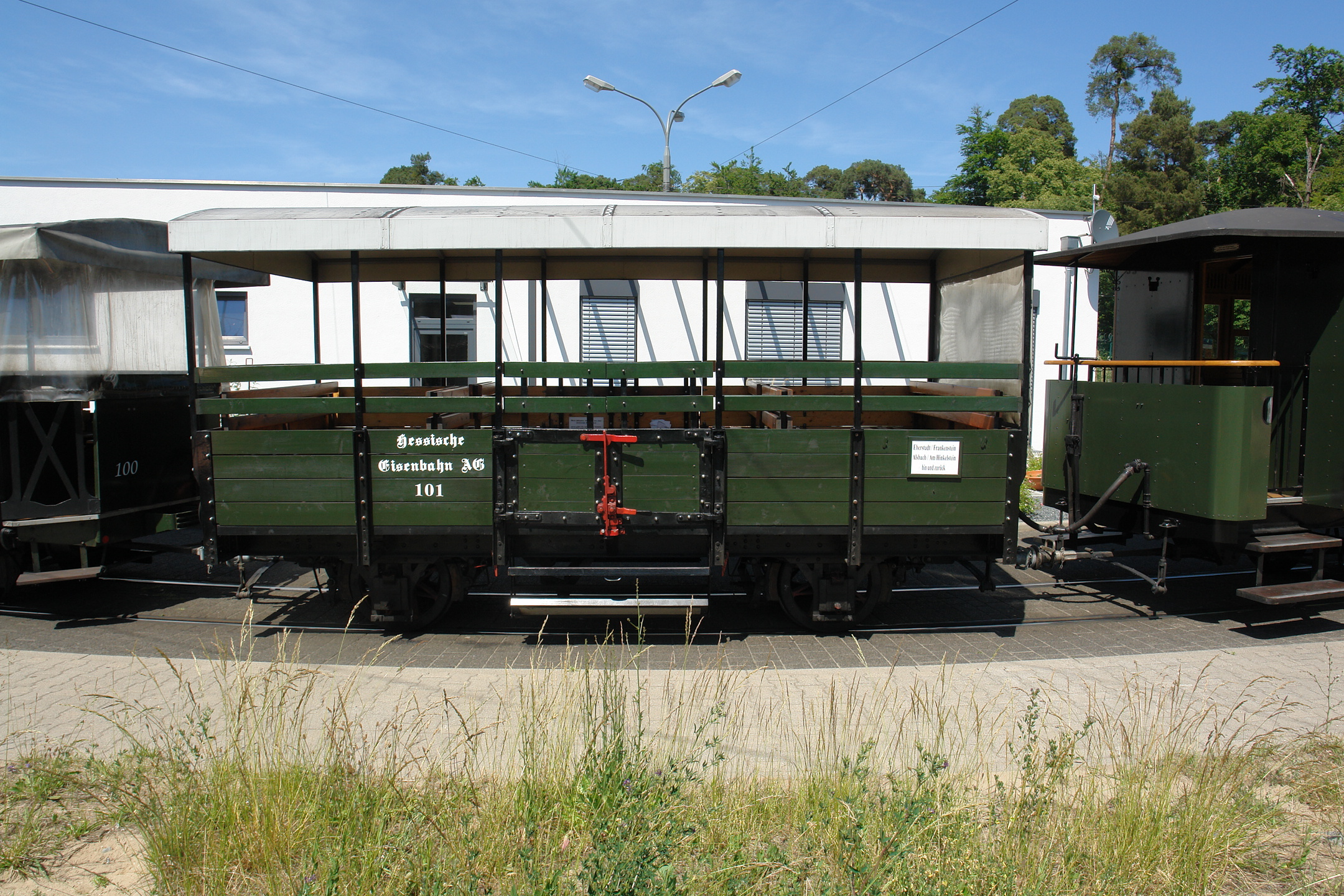
Carriage No. 101

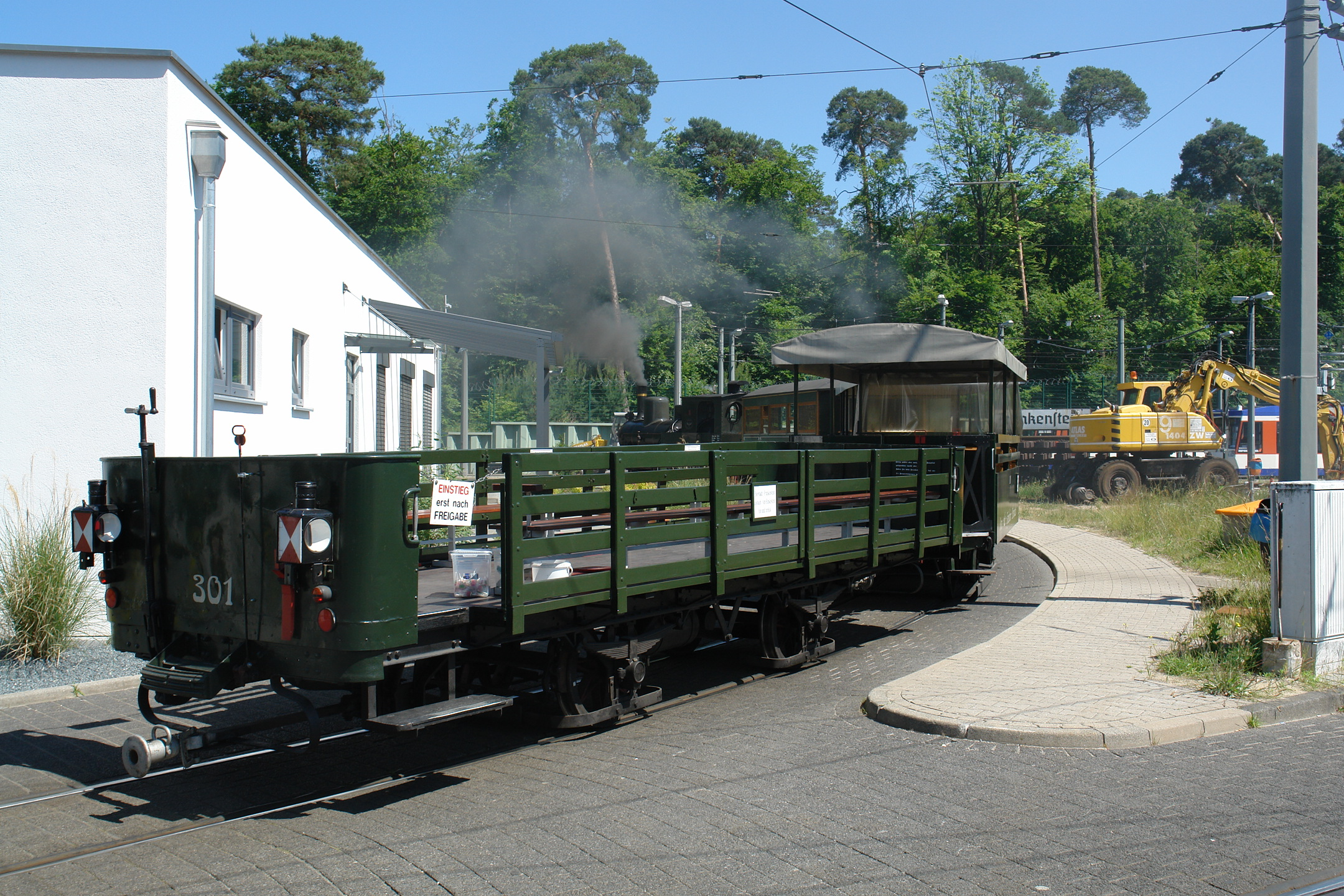
Carriage No. 301

== See also ==
- List of town tramway systems in Germany
- Trams in Germany

== Bibliography ==
- Bürnheim, Hermann; Burmeister, Jürgen (1997). Bahnen und Busse rund um den langen Ludwig. (Engl.: Railways and Buses around the long Ludwig) (4th ed.). Düsseldorf: Alba Publikation. ISBN 978-3-87094-357-8. (German)
- Höltge, Dieter; Köhler, Günter H. (1992). Straßen- und Stadtbahnen in Deutschland [Tramways and Stadtbahnen in Germany] (in German). Vol. Band 1: Hessen [Volume 1: Hesse] (2nd., enlarged ed.). Freiburg i. B., Germany: EK-Verlag. ISBN 3882553359.
- Schwandl, Robert (2012). Schwandl's Tram Atlas Deutschland (3rd ed.). Berlin: Robert Schwandl Verlag. ISBN 978-3-936573-33-6.
