= Wixhausen =

- Stadtteil of Darmstadt
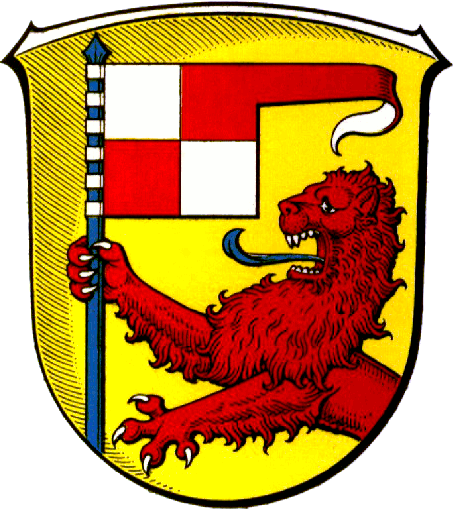
- Coat of arms

- Location of Wixhausen within Darmstadt
- Interactive map of Wixhausen
- Location within Germany Location within Hesse
- Coordinates: 49°55′52″N 8°38′59″E
- Country: Germany
- State: Hesse
- Admin. region: Darmstadt
- District: Urban district
- City: Darmstadt

Area
  - Total: 6.29 km^{2} (2.43 sq mi)
- Elevation: 123 m (404 ft)

Population (2019-12-31)
  - Total: 6,404
  - Density: 1,020/km^{2} (2,640/sq mi)
- Time zone: UTC+01:00 (CET)
  - Summer (DST): UTC+02:00 (CEST)
- Postal codes: 64291
- Dialling codes: 06150

Wixhausen is northernmost borough of the City of Darmstadt in southern Hesse, Germany. Covering an area of 23.247 km^{2}, in 2006 it had 5,772 inhabitants and 1,310 houses. It is noted for the GSI heavy-ion research laboratory located there.

The district of Darmstadt-Arheilgen is just South of Wixhausen. The city of Erzhausen is just to the North of Wixhausen.

== History ==
Wixhausen was already inhabited in the Bronze Age. The first signs of settlement in the Wixhausen district can be found around 1400 BC. 750/780 Wixhausen was then incorporated into the Frankish Empire. Wixhausen was first mentioned by name in 1172 as "Wickenhusen", which means something like "settlement by the pond", since in the Middle Ages the area was traversed by several spring streams with small ponds. The baroque evangelical church built between 1774 and 1776 is worth seeing. It has a daily manually wound chime from 1517 in the Romanesque tower from 1150 (the oldest surviving structure in Darmstadt) and special windows (“Physikfenster” by Thomas Duttenhoefer, 1997).

As part of the local government reform in Hesse, the municipality of Wixhausen was incorporated into Darmstadt in 1977.

== Coat of arms ==
In gold a growing red, blue-tongued lion, with his right paw clasping the blue shaft of a flag squared with silver and red. Registered in the Hessian State Archives in 1962.

== Boroughs of Darmstadt ==
Darmstadt has 9 official 'Stadtteile' (boroughs). These are, alphabetically:

- Darmstadt-Arheilgen
- Darmstadt-Bessungen
- Darmstadt-Eberstadt
- Darmstadt-Kranichstein
- Darmstadt-Mitte ('Central')
- Darmstadt-Nord ('North')
- Darmstadt-Ost ('East')
- Darmstadt-West ('West')
- Darmstadt-Wixhausen

== Transport ==
Wixhausen has a small rail station on the Main-Neckar Railway, between Darmstadt Hauptbahnhof and Frankfurt. It is served by line S6 of the Rhine-Main S-Bahn. Bus lines WX and 662 also serve Wixhausen. The main road through the town is the B3. The Bundesautobahn 5 freeway is to the West of town.

== Gallery ==
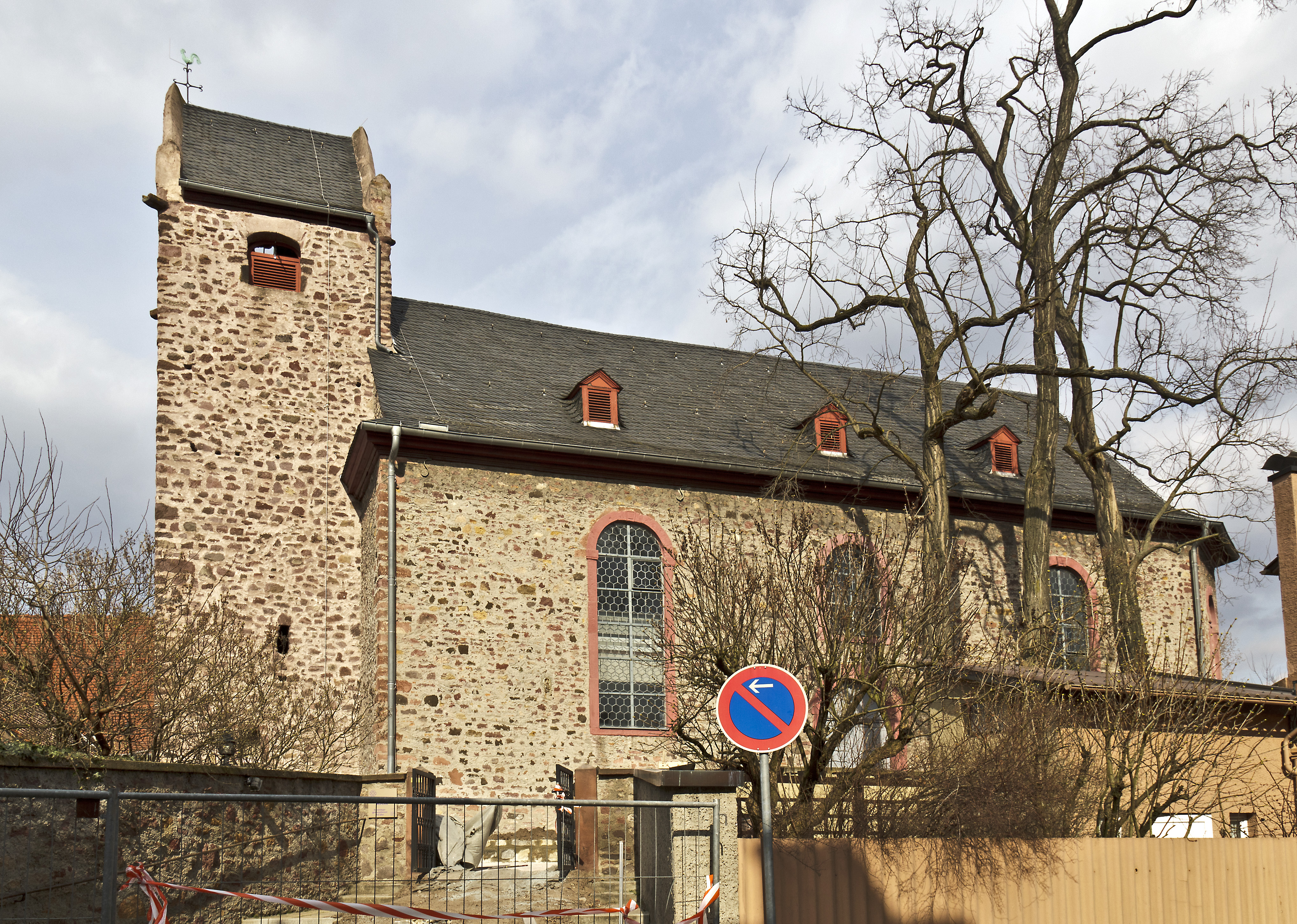
Wixhausen Baroque Protestant church (2011)

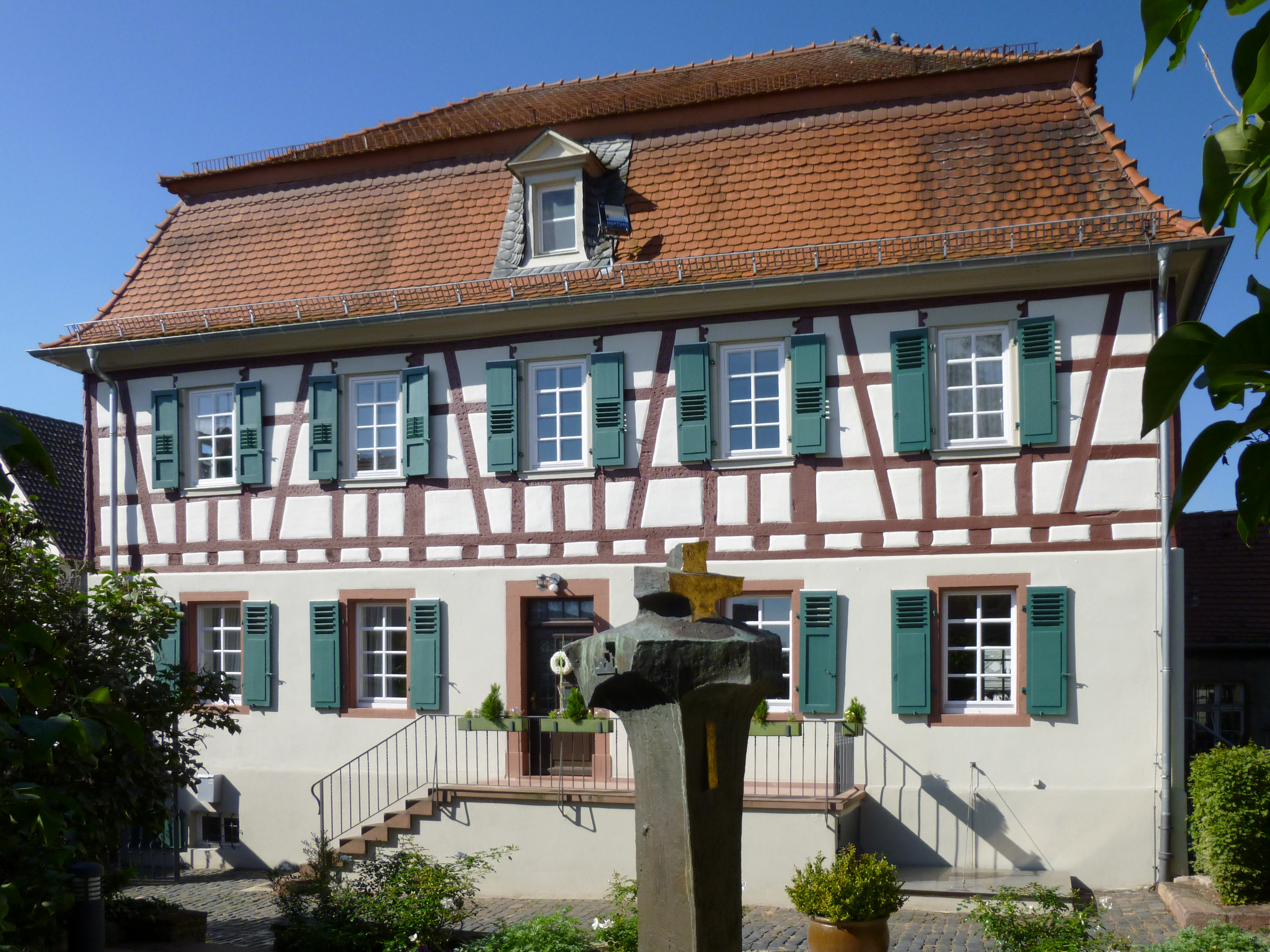
Clergy house (2012)

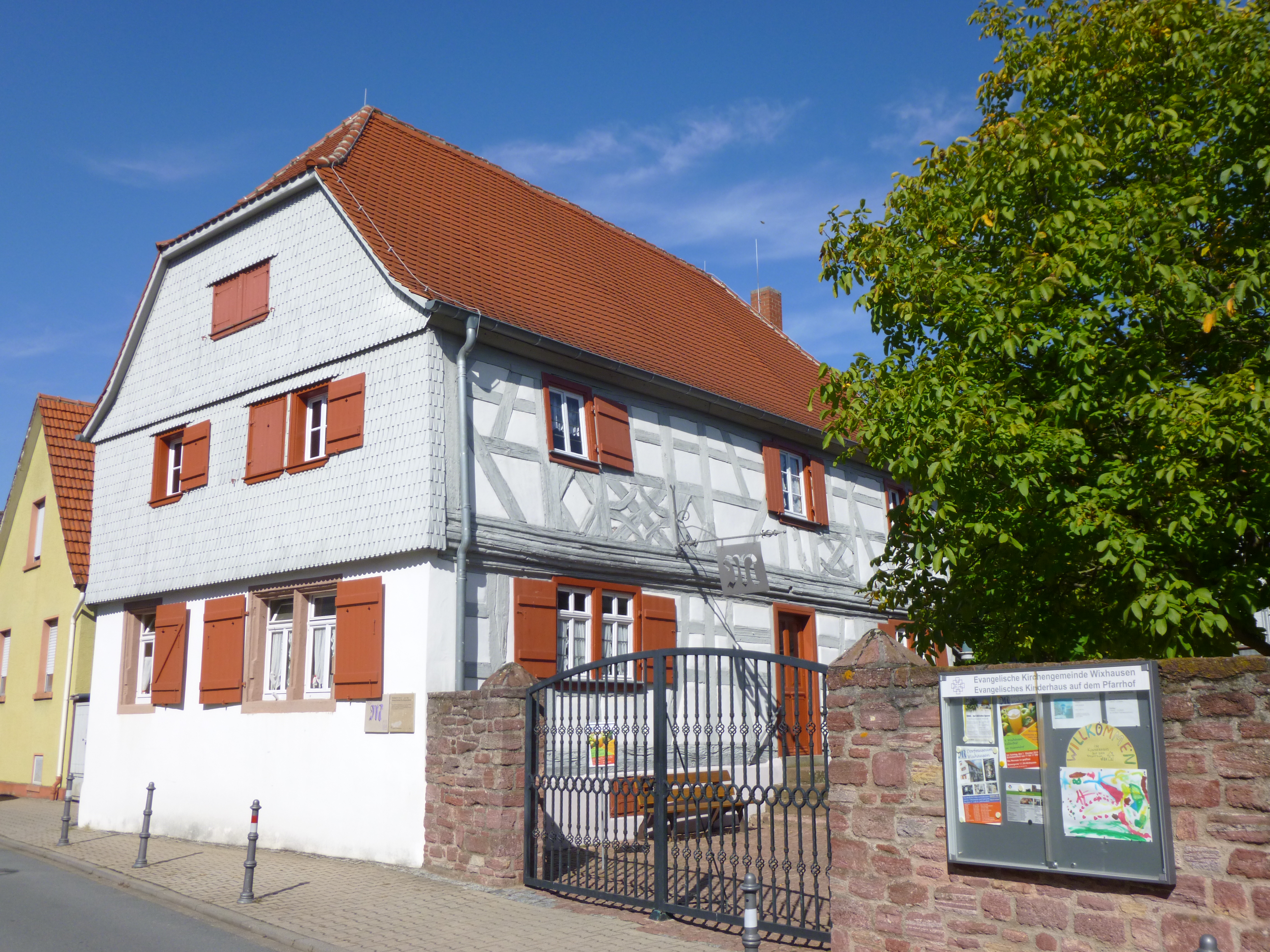
Local museum (2012)

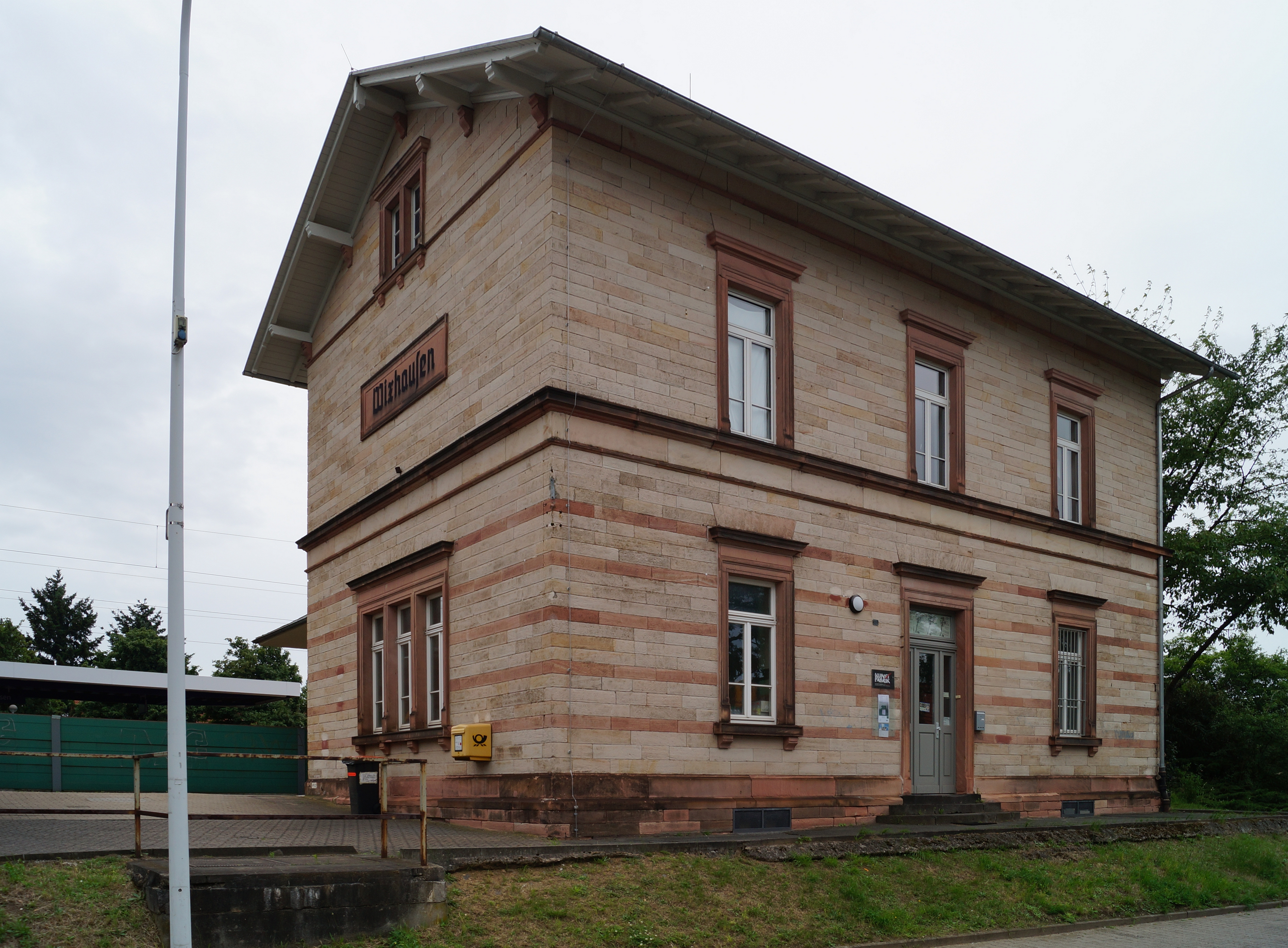
Wixhausen Rail station (2012)

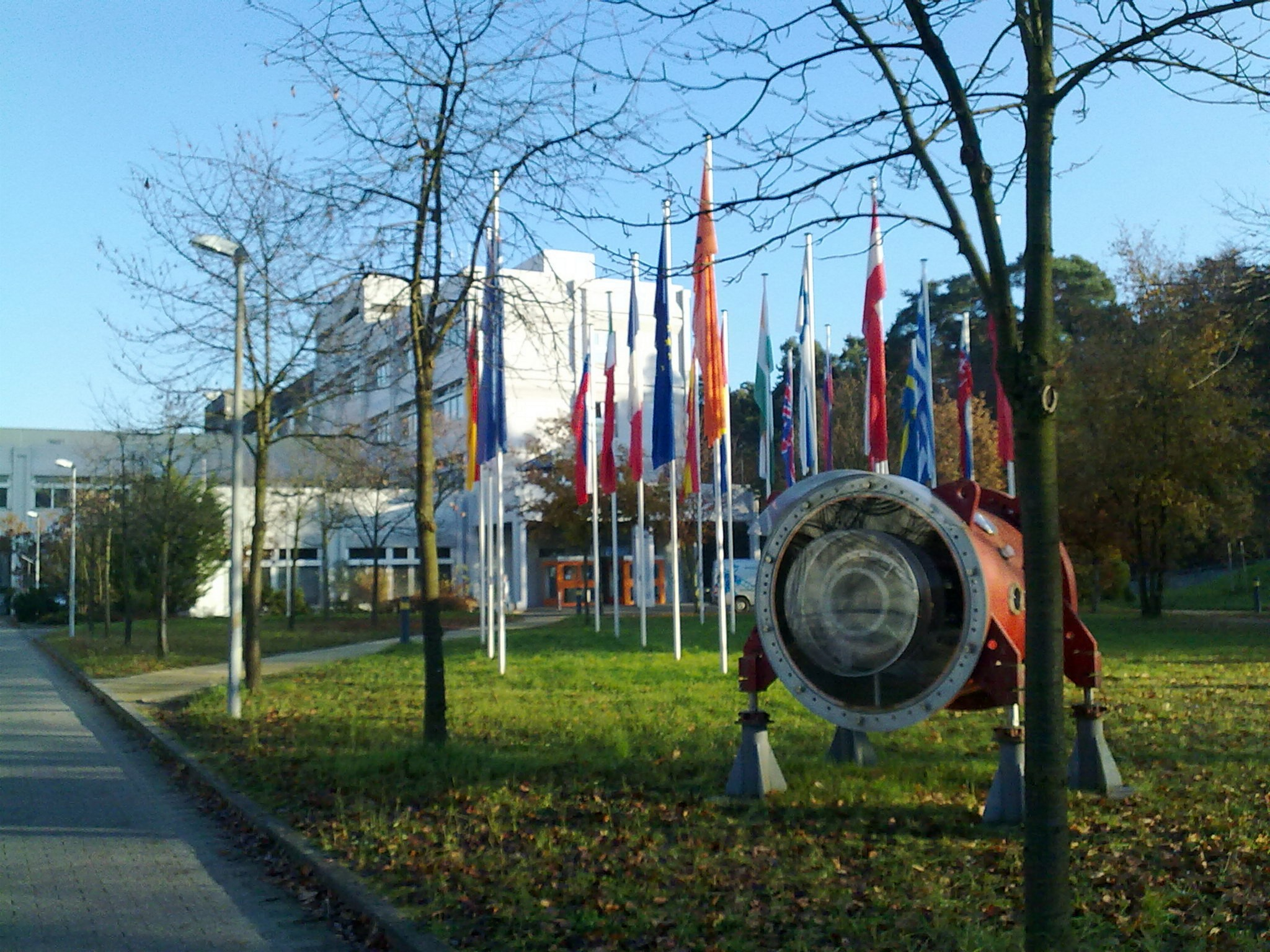
GSI Helmholtz Centre for Heavy Ion Research (2011)

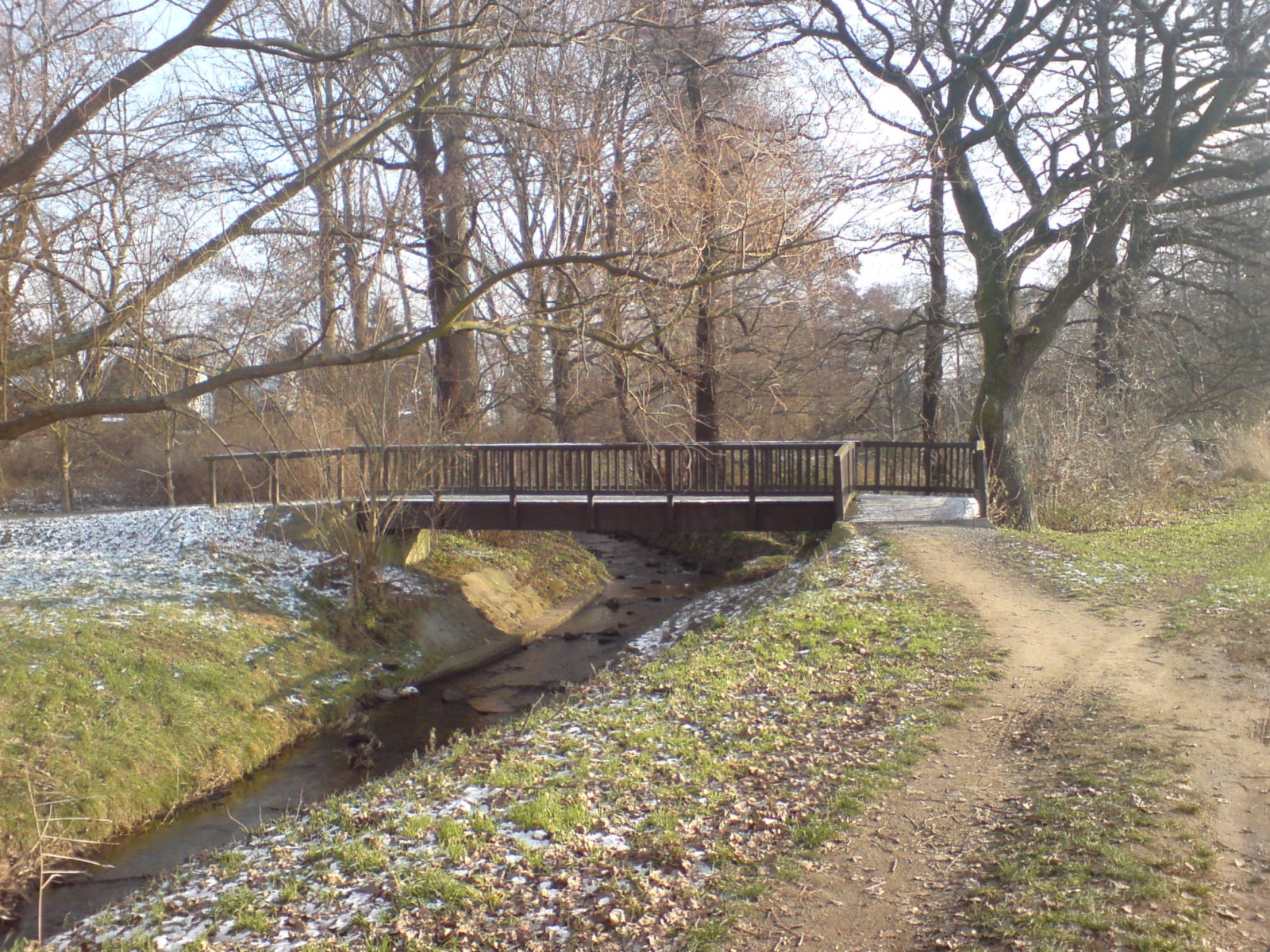
Bridge over little creek near Wixhausen (2009)
