= Darmstadt-Eberstadt =

- Borough of Darmstadt
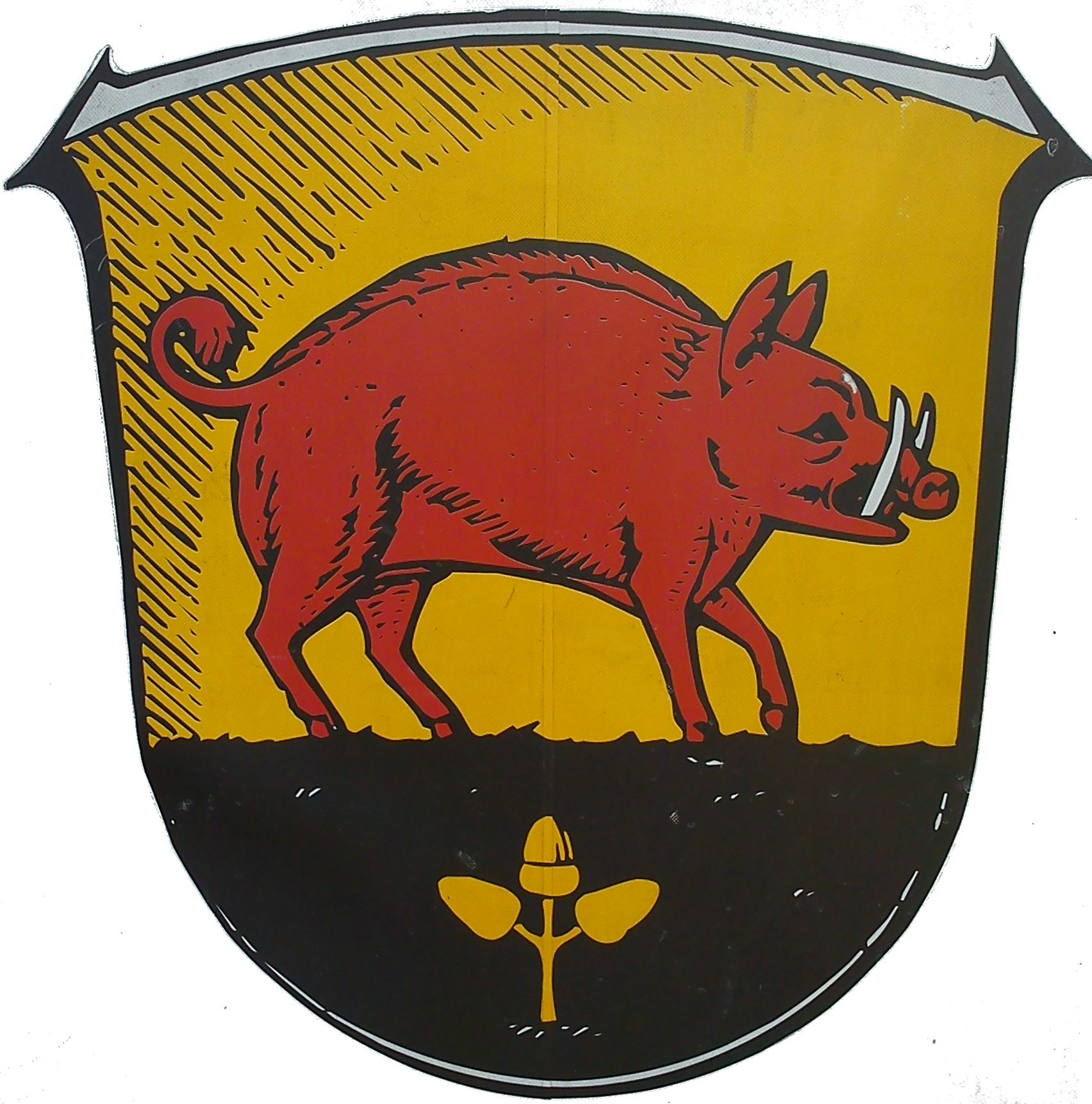
- Coat of arms
- Interactive map of Darmstadt-Eberstadt
- Location within Germany Location within Hesse
- Coordinates: 49°49′N 8°39′E
- Country: Germany
- State: Hesse
- Admin. region: Darmstadt
- District: Urban district
- Town: Darmstadt
- Subdivisions: 5 statistical districts

Population (2019-12-31)
  - Total: 23,728
- Time zone: UTC+01:00 (CET)
  - Summer (DST): UTC+02:00 (CEST)
- Postal codes: 64297
- Dialling codes: 06151
- Vehicle registration: DA

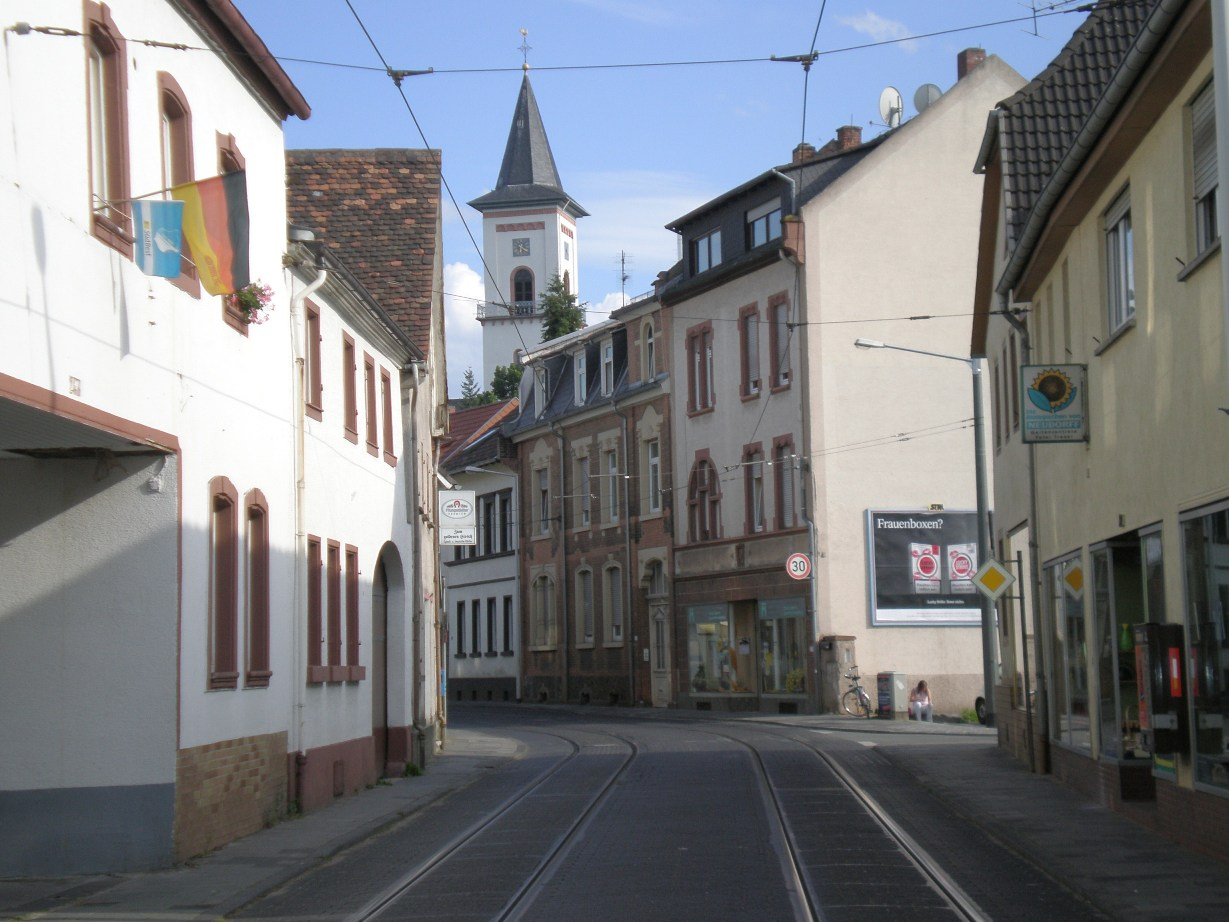
The spire of the protestant church in Eberstadt, seen from the north from the Heidelberger Landstraße.

Eberstadt is the southernmost borough of Darmstadt in Hessen, Germany with a population of 23,728 (as of 2019).

== Geography ==
In the north Eberstadt borders the boroughs of Bessungen and Darmstadt-West, in the east and south the municipalities of Mühltal and Seeheim-Jugenheim and in the west to the town of Pfungstadt. Eberstadt is a part of the Bergstraße. Between Eberstadt and Zwingenberg it splits into the "Old" and "New" Bergstraße (Bundesstraße 3).

=== Statistical districts ===
There are 5 statistical districts subdividing Eberstadt.

=== Structure ===
Eberstadt is spread mainly along Heidelberger Landstraße, which is also the route of the tram line to central Darmstadt. The historical village centre (Alt-Eberstadt) is at the intersection between Heidelberger Landstraße, running north-south, the eastbound Mühltalstraße and the westbound Pfungstädter Straße. This formerly marked the crossing point of Bundesstraße 3 and Bundestraße 426, but both these interregional roads now have bypasses aroun Eberstadt.

The built-up area of Eberstadt has spread out mainly northwards from the village centre, towards Darmstadt. In all other directions around the centre it spread evenly, so that today it has the form of a bottle lined up to the north. This development is comparable to other towns in the circle around Darmstadt like Griesheim or Weiterstadt.

=== Villenkolonie ===
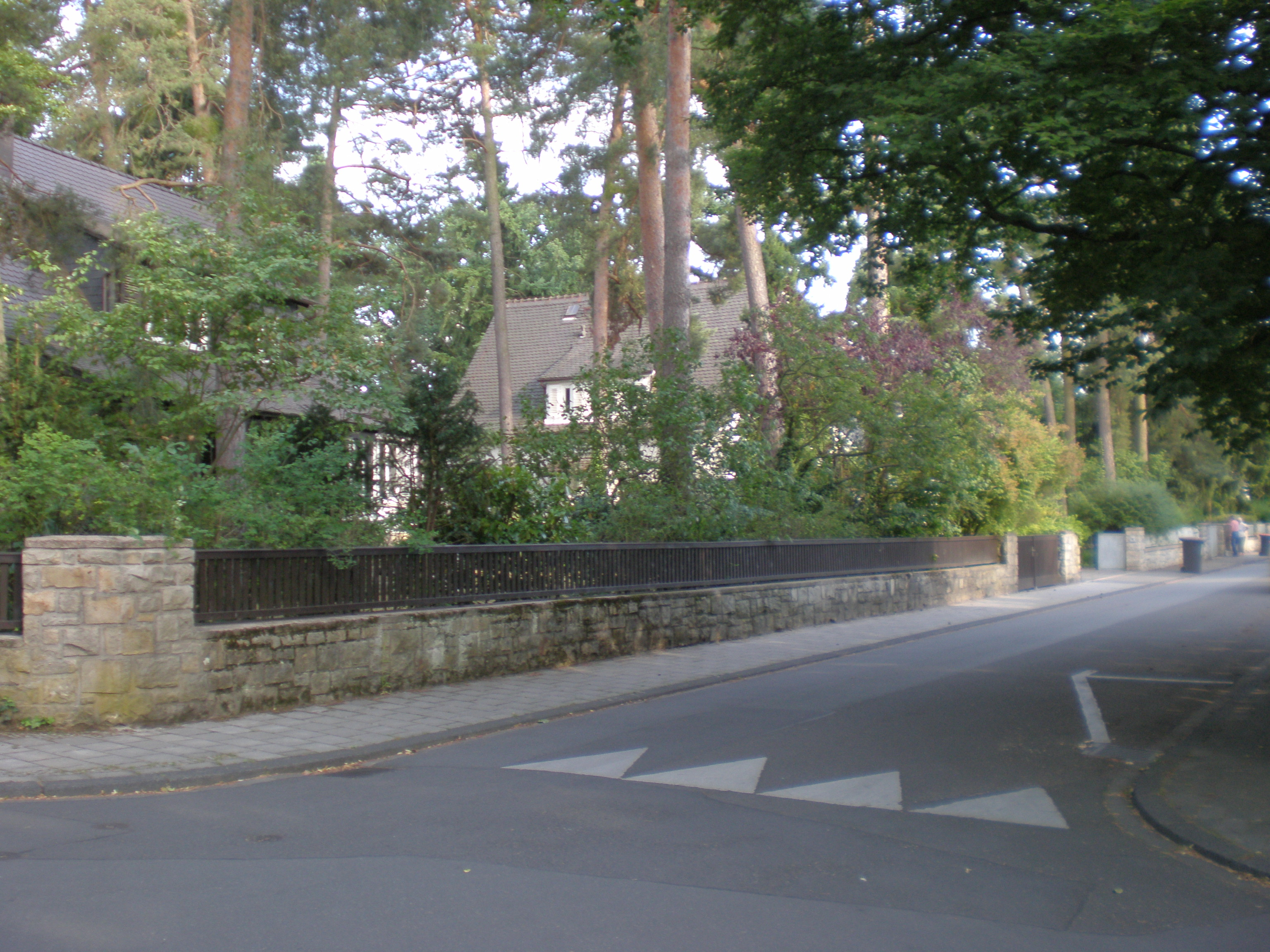
A scene in Villenkolonie

The Villenkolonie, marking the bond between Alt-Eberstadt and Darmstadt(-Bessungen), is the northern "bottle-neck" of Eberstadt. Further north are the housing areas of the U.S. Army Garrison Darmstadt around Cambrai-Fritsch Kaserne.

This upscale residential area is located mainly eastwards from Heidelberger Landstraße at the northern Odenwald-slopes. According to inscriptions at some villas, they were built around the turn of the 20th century. The northern parts are built in a former forest, so there are many trees between the houses, which gives the area the typical quiet, shady environment.

=== Alt-Eberstadt ===
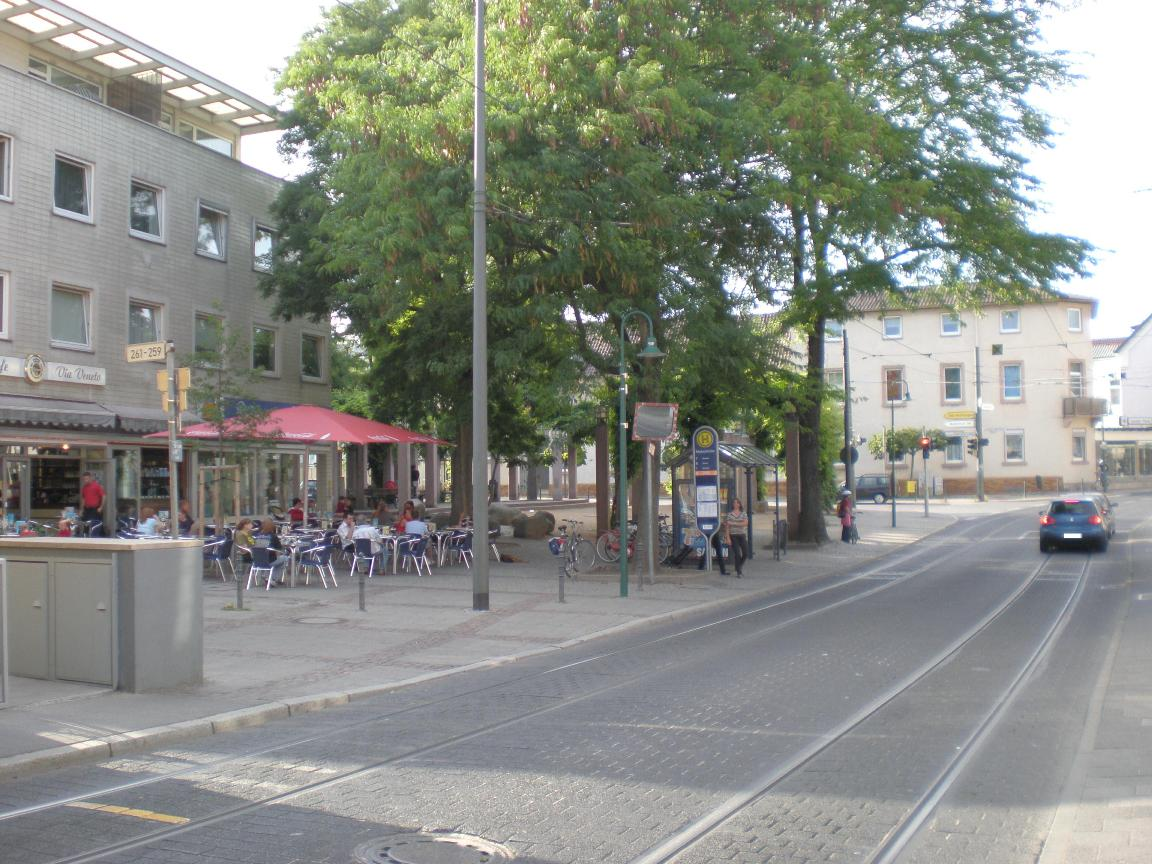
Modaubrücke

Alt-Eberstadt is the oldest part of Eberstadt. Contrary to Villenkolonie the houses here are predominantly build wall-on-wall. Some houses in Oberstraße and Heidelberger Landstraße are older than 300 years.

Many of these old buildings provide an insight into an agricultural past of the village. Along the Heidelberger Landstraße are three notable points in Alt-Eberstadt, all of which also have tram stops.

The northernmost first is the town-centre, which is at Wartehalle, the central bus and tram stop. From this point southwards is the shopping street of Eberstadt, which runs up to the second notable point, the Modaubrücke, where the Heidelberger Landstraße crosses the River Modau, and the intersection of north–south and east–west roads is located. The Protestant church, first mentioned in 1379, marks the third point. It is built upon a hill, where it can be seen from all directions, making it a landmarks of Eberstadt.

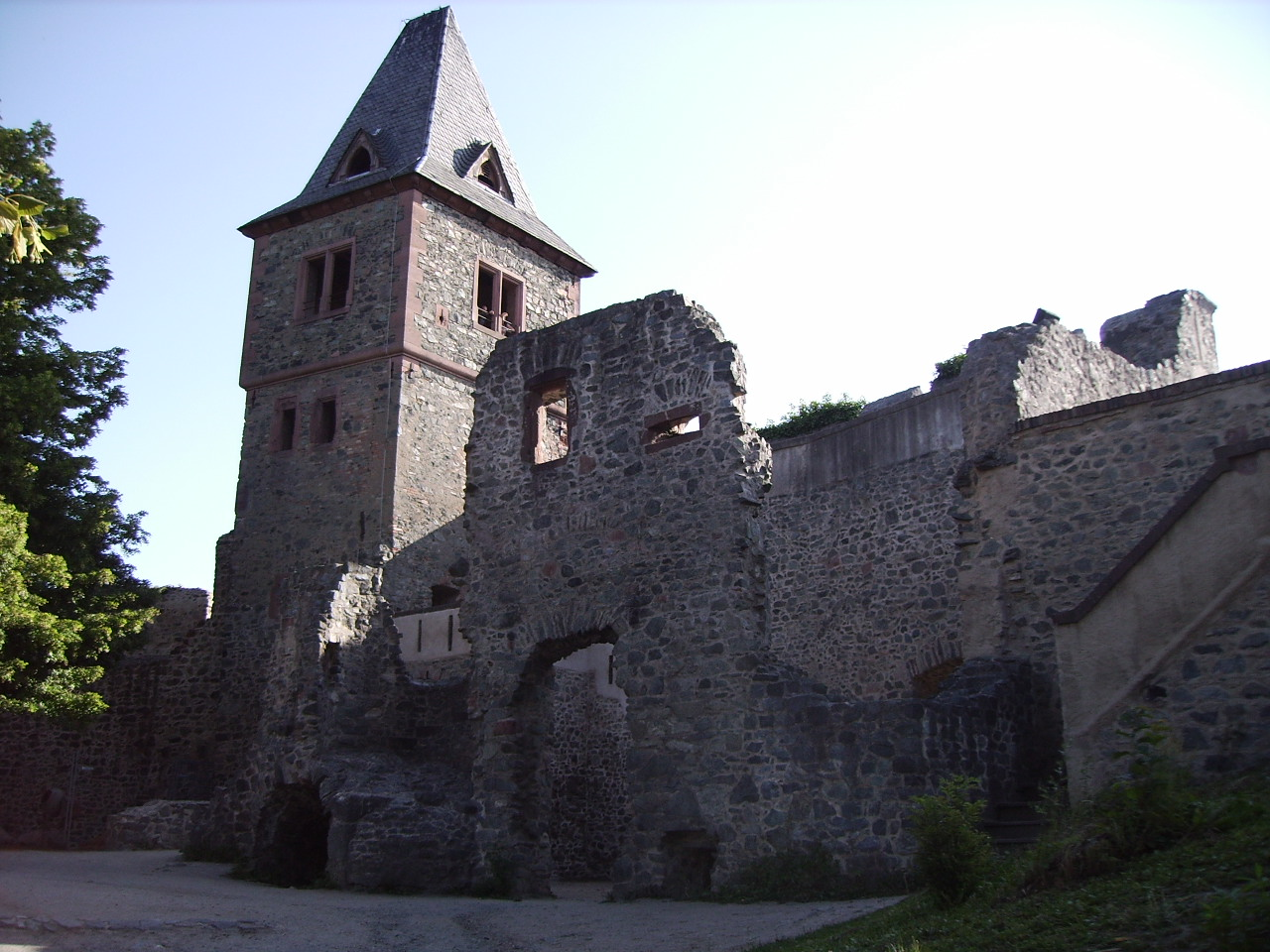
Tower and ruins of Castle Frankenstein, in the hills above Eberstadt

== History ==
Eberstadt was in the time of Charlemagne a small town south of the River Modau, at the intersection of two trade routes; one was a Roman road from Ladenburg. The first documentary mention of Eberstadt is in a document about Walther and Gemahlin Williswind at the Lorsch Abbey, dated 1 September 782.

In the 13th century, Lords of Frankenstein came to Eberstadt. It remained for over 400 years the possession Lords of Frankenstein. The Frankenstein Castle is first mentioned in 1252.

In 1292 the Frankensteins opened the castle to the counts of Katzenelnbogen (County of Katzenelnbogen) Katzenelnbogen and leagued with them.

The Landgrave of Hesse-Darmstadt acquired the residence in 1661. Later the Frankenstein owner sold their property and moved to Middle Franconia.

In 1635, during the Thirty Years' War, the Swedes burned down almost the entire village. Many of the residents who were able to escape to the fortified Darmstadt died there of the plague. The reconstruction lasted more than 40 years.

In the 18th century the social situation of the inhabitants of Eberstadt improved. The lively tourist traffic through the town allowed trade and commerce to flourish, and many large inns sprang up along the main street.

In the 19th century, the new Main-Neckar railway and the beginning of industrialization helped Eberstadt to develop further. The number of inhabitants increased sharply, and there was a lively club life. The town hall built in 1847 still bears witness to the self-confidence of the up-and-coming community.

After 1900, Eberstadt had a good 6,000 inhabitants and had expanded in the north with a colony of villas up to the municipal boundary of Darmstadt. A narrow-gauge suburban railway connected both places. Own water, gas and electricity works, a public library, a public bath, a new cemetery hall and two new schools were built. More industry settled there, including six breweries, and street lighting was introduced. In 1914 the suburban railway was electrified and operated as a tram. This could not be extended until 1936 as an overland line to Seeheim and Jugenheim.

On 1 April 1937, the community, which had been independent until then, became part of Darmstadt.

== Coat of arms ==
The coat of armsof Eberstadt goes back to the seal of Lords of Frankenstein Court. The oldest evidence of this seal is from the October 1617 and shows a boar with three acorns.

The present coat of arms in use today was established in 1972. It shows a boar in the upper field and acorns at the bottom. The upper half of the shield is yellow, the lower black, the boar dark red, his tusks are white. With the colors red and gold are from the Lords of Frankenstein.

The oldest seal impressions is from 1617. The name Eberstadt can possibly be attributed to a name, probably of the Frankish nobleman who in the 7th or early 8th Century founded the settlement.

== Transportation ==
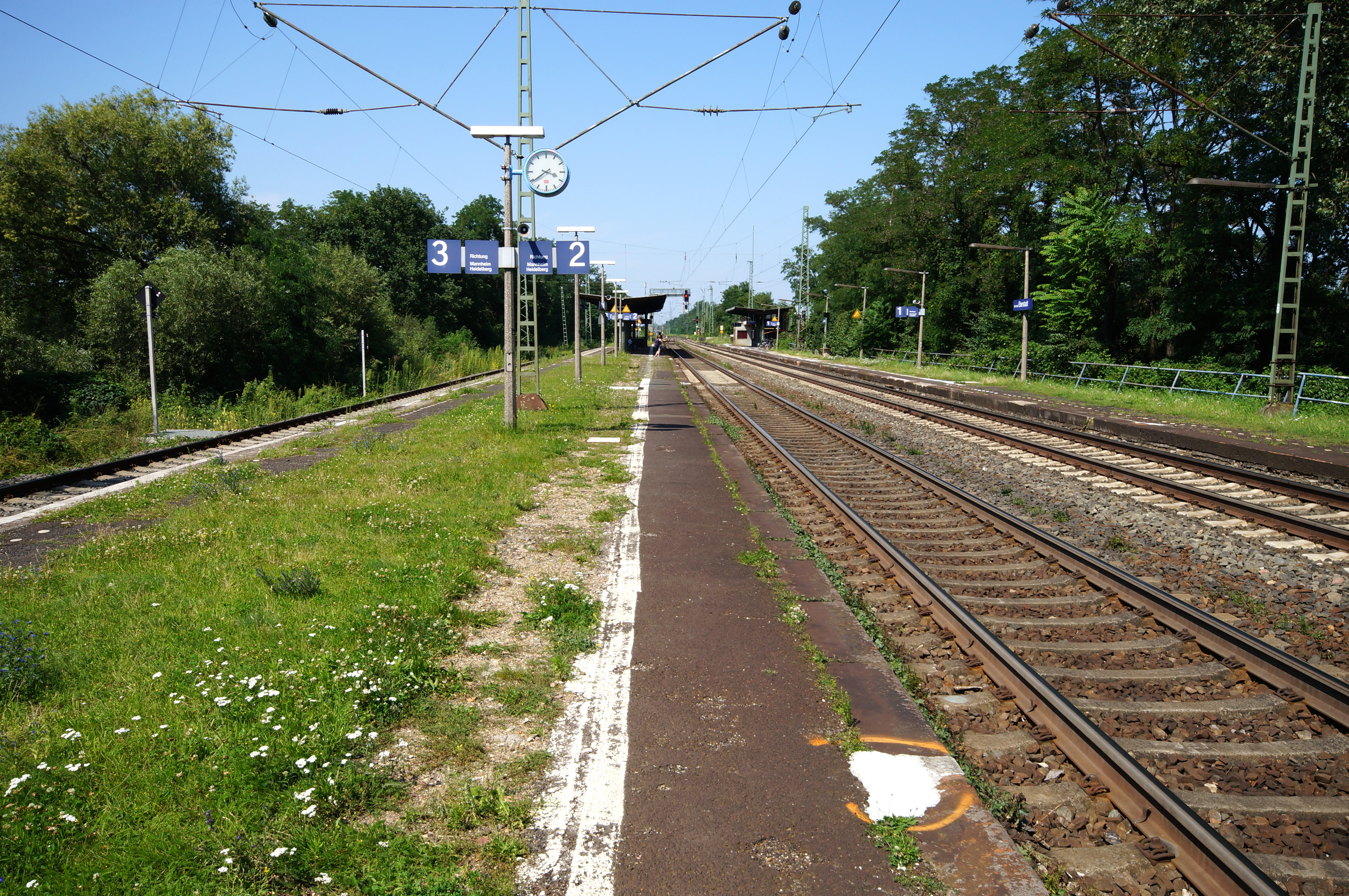
Darmstadt-Eberstadt railway station

=== Roads ===
Eberstadt is situated next to the Bundesautobahn 5, at the next exit south from the Darmstädter Kreuz interchange.

Bundesstraße 3 passes around the west of Eberstadt, running between Bensheim and Darmstadt. The southbound part of the B3 is the new Bergstraße. Bundestraße 426, running east-west, also passes around Eberstadt. This is one of the major connections from the Bundesautobahn 5 to the Odenwald. To the east it connects Eberstadt to Mühltal, Ober-Ramstadt and the Odenwald; to the western to Pfungstadt and Gernsheim.

=== Rail ===
Darmstadt-Eberstadt station station is located to the west of the village centre and has Regionalbahn connections to Frankfurt, Heidelberg and Darmstadt.

=== Trams and Buses ===
The central tram and bus stop is at Wartehalle. It is on the Darmstadt tram network's route from central Darmstadt to Alsbach. Eberstadt is the terminus of lines 1 and 7 and also served by lines 6 and 8, which continue to Alsbach. There are also bus connections to Mühltal and Pfungstadt. The tram and bus services are all integrated into the Rhein-Main-Verkehrsverbund.

== Boroughs of Darmstadt ==
Darmstadt has 9 official 'Stadtteile' (boroughs). These are, alphabetically:

- Darmstadt-Arheilgen
- Darmstadt-Bessungen
- Darmstadt-Eberstadt
- Darmstadt-Kranichstein
- Darmstadt-Mitte ('Central')
- Darmstadt-Nord ('North')
- Darmstadt-Ost ('East')
- Darmstadt-West ('West')
- Darmstadt-Wixhausen

== Sister cities ==
As borough of Darmstadt, Eberstadt has no sister cities, as sister cities are a matter for the city as a whole (see Darmstadt's sister cities). In a development area at the southeastern border (Am Frankenstein district), some streets are named according to Darmstadt's sister cities, e.g. Chesterfieldstraße or Grazstraße.
