= Darmstadt-Arheilgen =

Arheilgen
- Stadtteil of Darmstadt
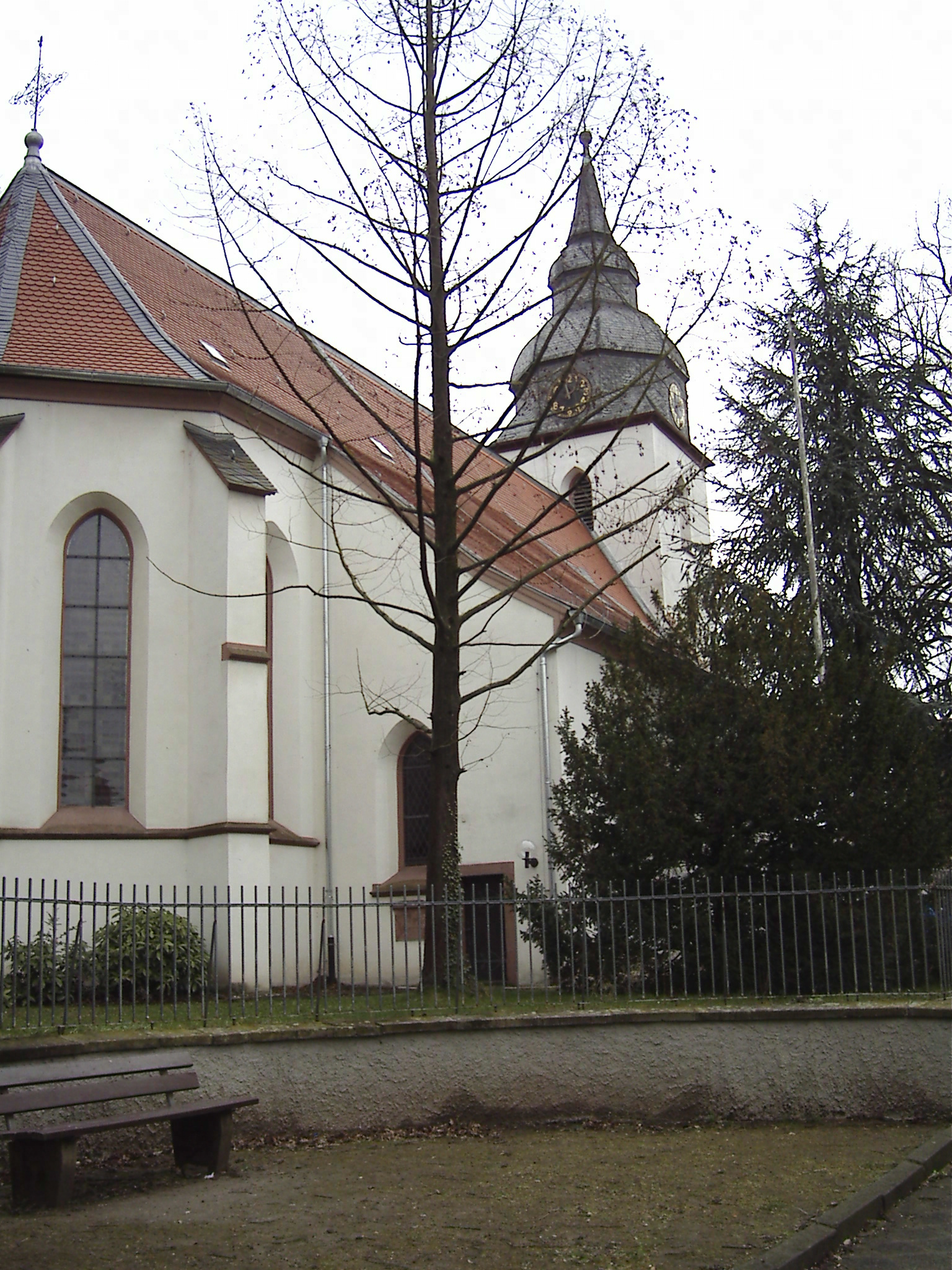
- Evangelical Lutheran Church

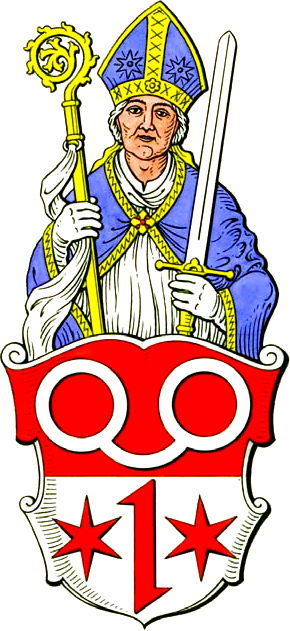
- Coat of arms

- Location of Arheilgen within Darmstadt
- Interactive map of Arheilgen
- Location within Germany Location within Hesse
- Coordinates: 49°54′39″N 8°39′26″E
- Country: Germany
- State: Hesse
- Admin. region: Darmstadt
- District: Urban district
- City: Darmstadt

Area
  - Total: 11.27 km^{2} (4.35 sq mi)
- Elevation: 129 m (423 ft)

Population (2019-12-31)
  - Total: 17,927
  - Density: 1,591/km^{2} (4,120/sq mi)
- Time zone: UTC+01:00 (CET)
  - Summer (DST): UTC+02:00 (CEST)
- Postal codes: 64291
- Dialling codes: 06151
- Website: www.darmstadt.de

Arheilgen is a district in the north of the city of Darmstadt in Hesse, Germany, incorporated in 1937. Arheilgen borders the Darmstadt district of Wixhausen to the North, to the West is the town of Weiterstadt, to the East is the Darmstadt district of Kranichstein and to the South is the city center of Darmstadt.

== History ==
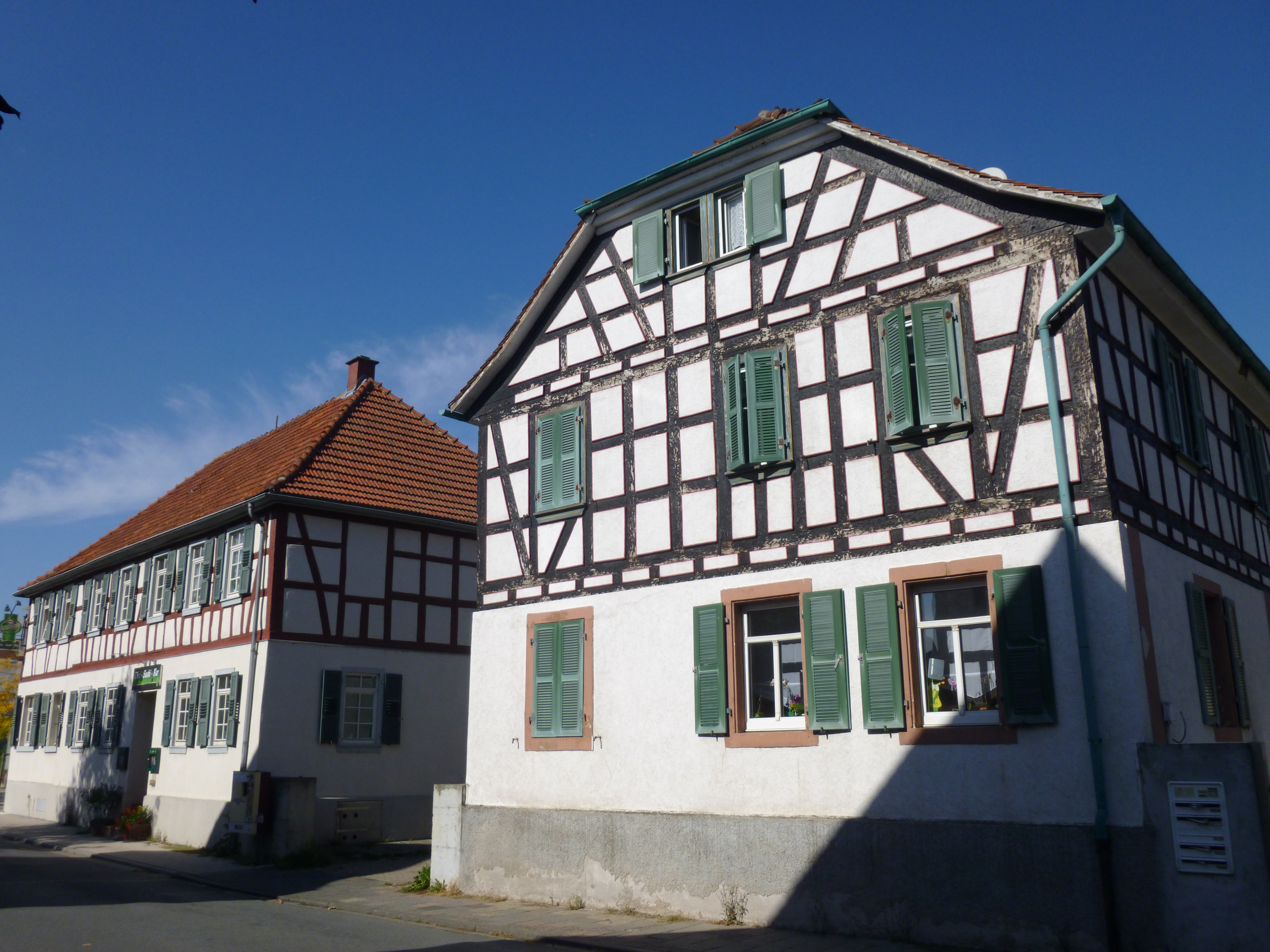
Historical houses in Arheilgen

The actual settlement probably began in the second half of the first millennium, when a number of Frankish settlements arose in the Rhine-Main-Neckar area. The place name in its old spelling "Araheiligon" is mentioned for the first time in an undated interest register of Seligenstadt Abbey, which an unknown scribe probably added to a 9th-century gospel book of the monastery around the year 1000.

The Thirty Years' War shook Arheilgen hard. As early as 1622, the troops of Count von Mansfeld robbed all the houses and the church. In January 1635, the village was almost completely burned down by French troops. Only a few houses remained. The surviving residents fled behind the supposedly safe walls of nearby Darmstadt, where many of them died of the plague. At the end of the war in 1648, only about 12 families were left to rebuild the community.

== Seal and coat of arms ==
The coat of arms of the town developed from the court seal, the oldest surviving impression of which dates from 1636. The upper half shows the half figure of Saint Kilian, patron saint of the Franks, to whom the original Arheilgen church was dedicated. Beneath it are lying glasses, a Wolfsangel and two hexagonal stars. The origin of these symbols is still unclear.

== Economy ==
South of Arheilgen is the site of the world's oldest pharmaceutical and chemical company, Merck KGaA. The company is the largest employer in the region and supports both schools and clubs there. In agriculture, asparagus cultivation dominates.

== Transport ==
=== Railways ===
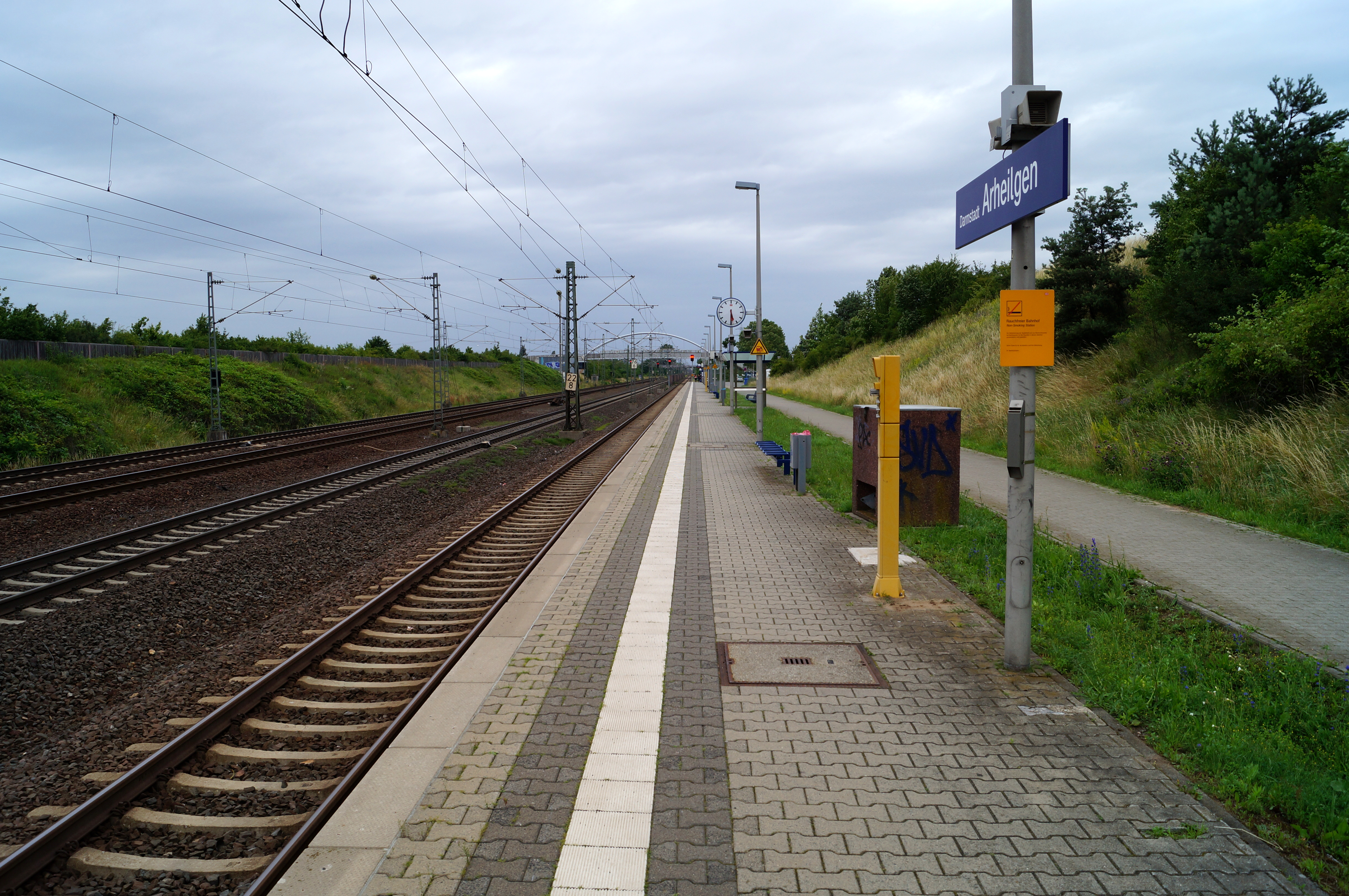
Railway platform station in Darmstadt-Arheilgen

Darmstadt-Arheilgen station is on the Main-Neckar Railway and was opened in 1848. It is station number 1130 and is served by line S6 of the Rhine-Main S-Bahn.

=== Trams and buses ===
Lines 6 and 8 of the Darmstadt tram network link Arheilgen to the city center. The tram route opened in 1890 as a steam tram service and was electrified between 1924 and 1926.

Bus lines WX and 662 also serve Arheilgen.

=== Roads ===
The freeways A5 and 67 are to the west of town. The main roads through the town are B3 in north–south direction and B26 in west–east direction.

== Boroughs of Darmstadt ==
Darmstadt has 9 official 'Stadtteile' (boroughs). These are, alphabetically:

- Darmstadt-Arheilgen
- Darmstadt-Bessungen
- Darmstadt-Eberstadt
- Darmstadt-Kranichstein
- Darmstadt-Mitte ('Central')
- Darmstadt-Nord ('North')
- Darmstadt-Ost ('East')
- Darmstadt-West ('West')
- Darmstadt-Wixhausen

== See also ==
- SG Arheilgen: football club in Darmstadt-Arheilgen.
- FCA Darmstadt: football club in Darmstadt-Arheilgen.
