= Rosenhöhe Park =

Park in Darmstadt, Germany

Coordinates: 49°52′35″N 8°40′42″E

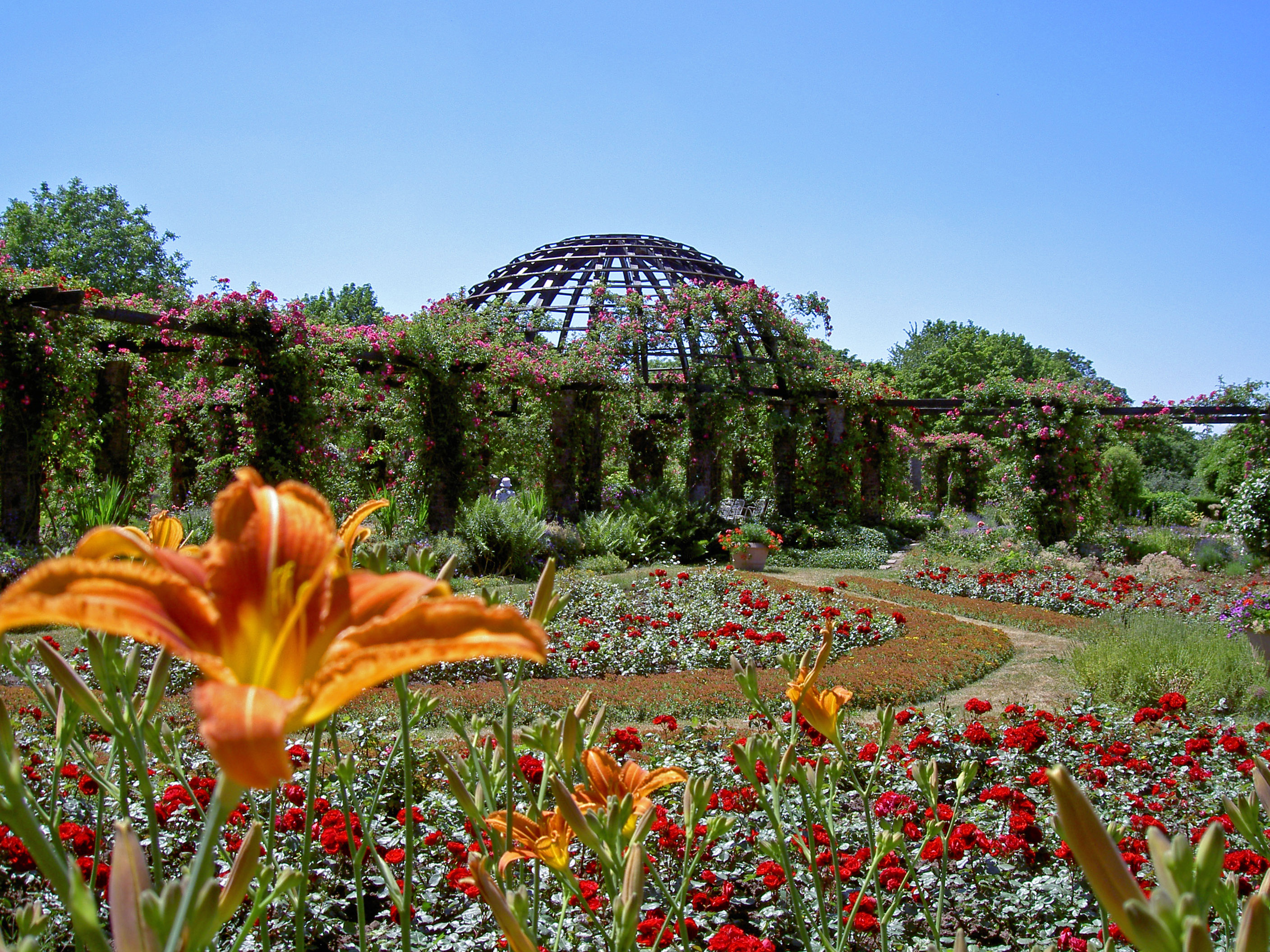
The Rose Dome

Rosenhöhe Park is a park in eastern Darmstadt, standing on a hill. It contains a rose garden, with a rose dome at its highest point, the remains of the Rosenhöhe Palace, the mausoleums of the Hessian grand-ducal family, meadows, orchards, and many tree species, including sequoias. The park serves as a recreation area.

The whole Rosenhöhe Park is a protected cultural asset under the Hague Convention. The buildings of the Mathildenhöhe, or New Rosenhöhe Artists' Colony, including Jugendstil houses and a Wedding Tower, stand on the edge of the park, but it is not part of the Darmstadt Artists' Colony UNESCO World Heritage Site.

== History ==
About 1810, Princess Wilhelmina of Baden, the wife of the future Louis II, Grand Duke of Hesse, had the Rosenhöhe Park laid out as an English landscape garden on the site of a former vineyard and planted it with exotic trees. It was given pavilions and teahouses, and a rather modest house, which as Grand Duchess Wilhelmina sometimes lived in.

In 1826, the Old Mausoleum, designed by Georg Moller, was built to house the tombs of the grand-ducal family, and the New Mausoleum was added in 1910.

In 1894, a palace was built in the southern part of the park, designed by Gustav Jacobi in a historicist style, to serve as a residence for a younger brother of Louis IV, Grand Duke of Hesse, Prince William. After his death in 1900, Ernest Louis, Grand Duke of Hesse, inherited the property and created the Rosarium. Later, the palace housed the Prussian embassy to the Grand Duchy of Hesse. After the First World War, it was divided into apartments. In 1944, it was severely damaged in the Allied bombing of Darmstadt and was demolished. A gate with a coat of arms and a fountain still survive, and a hedge outlines where the palace once stood.

The park was taken into the ownership of the city in 1979. The Rose Dome at its highest point was demolished and rebuilt in 2009. The main entrance is at the Lion Gate, built in 1914. The gatehouse and one of Grand Duchess Wilhelmina's teahouses have also been rebuilt.

== Lion Gate ==
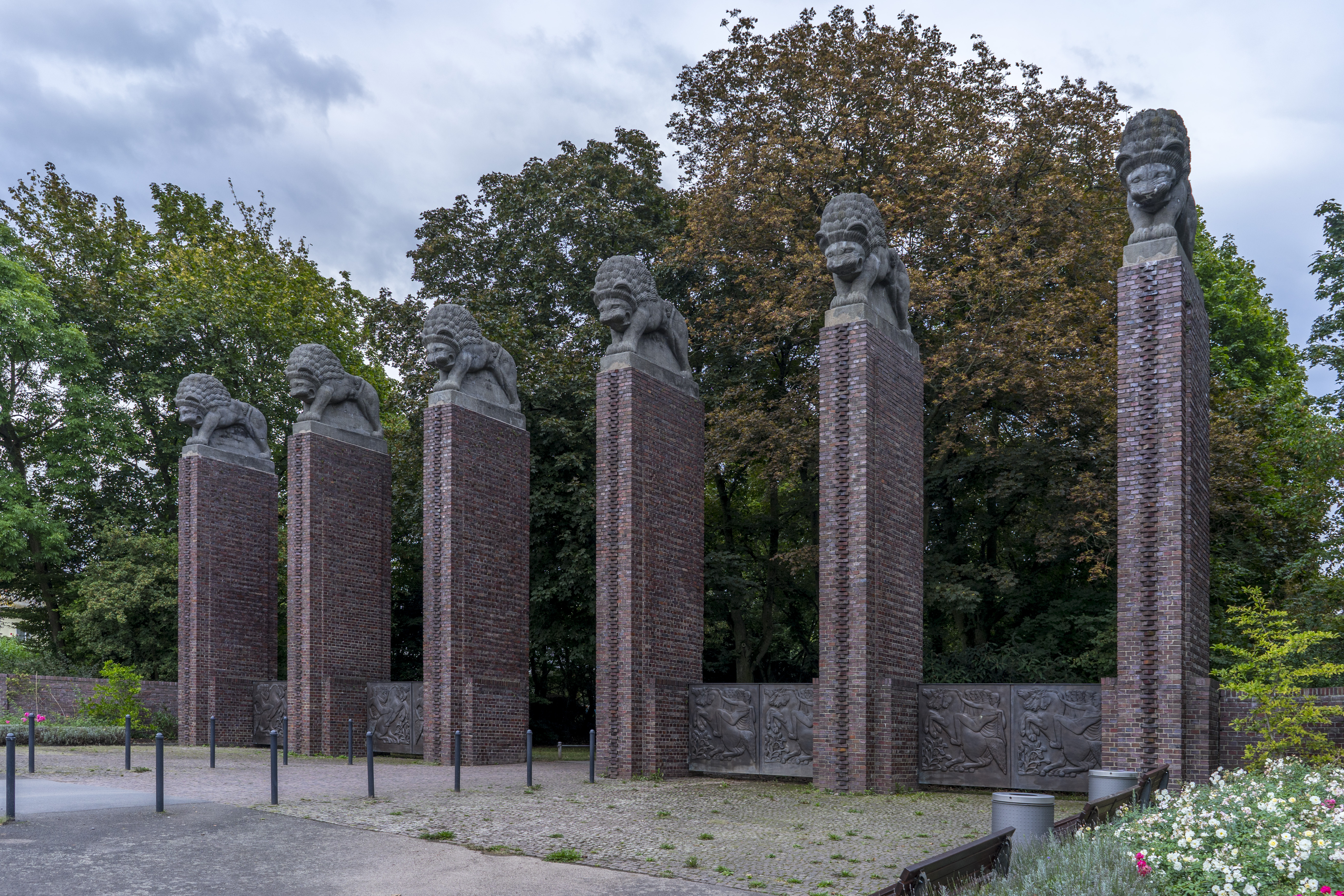
The Lion Gate

The Lion Gate stands at the main entrance to the Rosenhöhe, consisting of six clinker brick pillars designed by Albin Müller, on which are six lion sculptures by Bernhard Hoetger dating from 1914. The gates between the pillars have relief panels made in 1967 by the local artist Hermann Tomada, replicas of work by Hoetger. The Lion Gate was originally created as the main portal of the 4th Darmstadt Artists' Colony Exhibition of 1914 on the Mathildenhöhe, where the cast concrete lions stood on cast-stone double columns with Ionic capitals. After the exhibition, the gate was dismantled and stored. In 1927, Grand Duke Ernest Louis had it put up where it stands now. The lions are sometimes called the "sneezing hedgehogs".

== Gallery ==
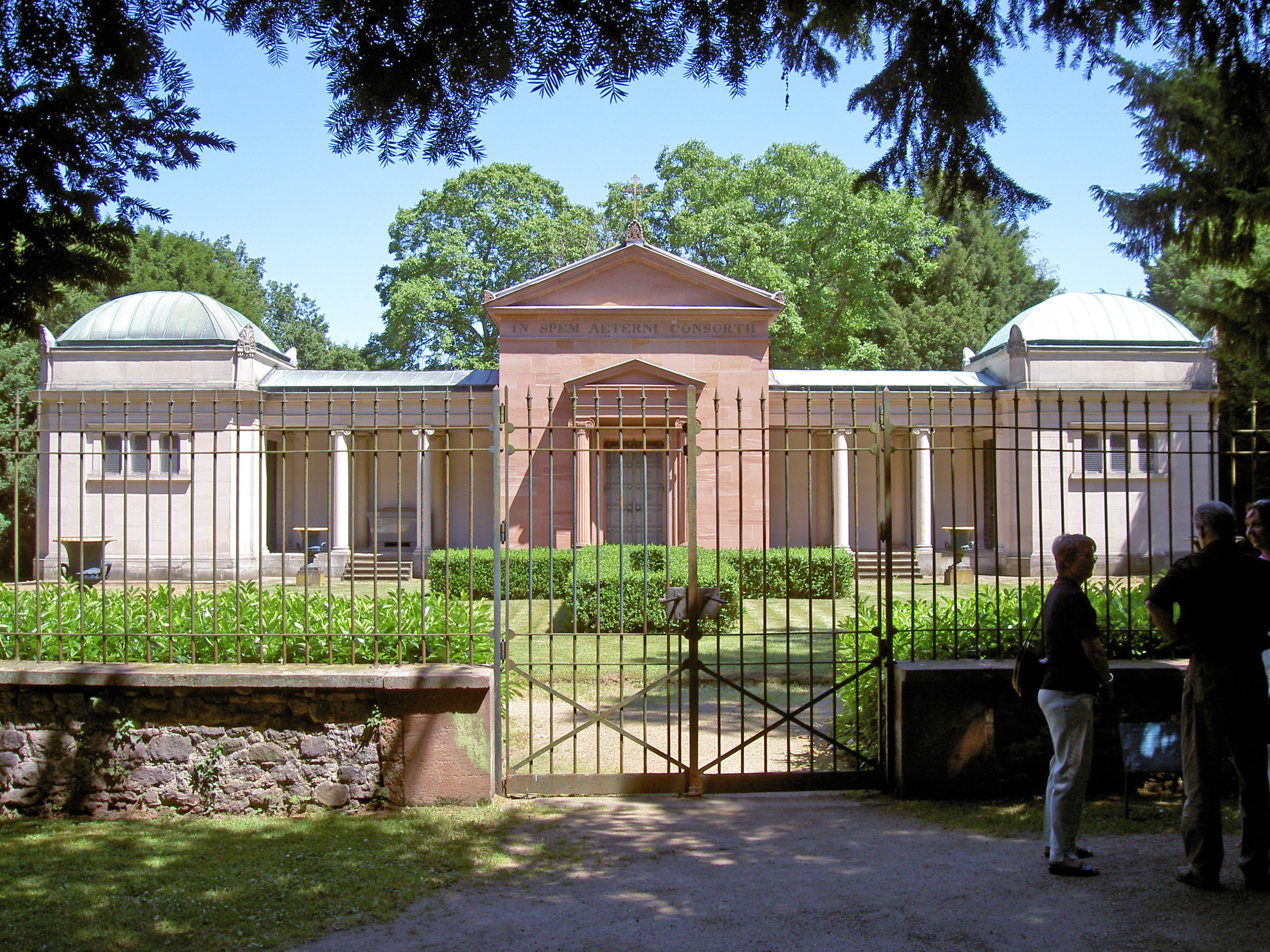
Old Mausoleum

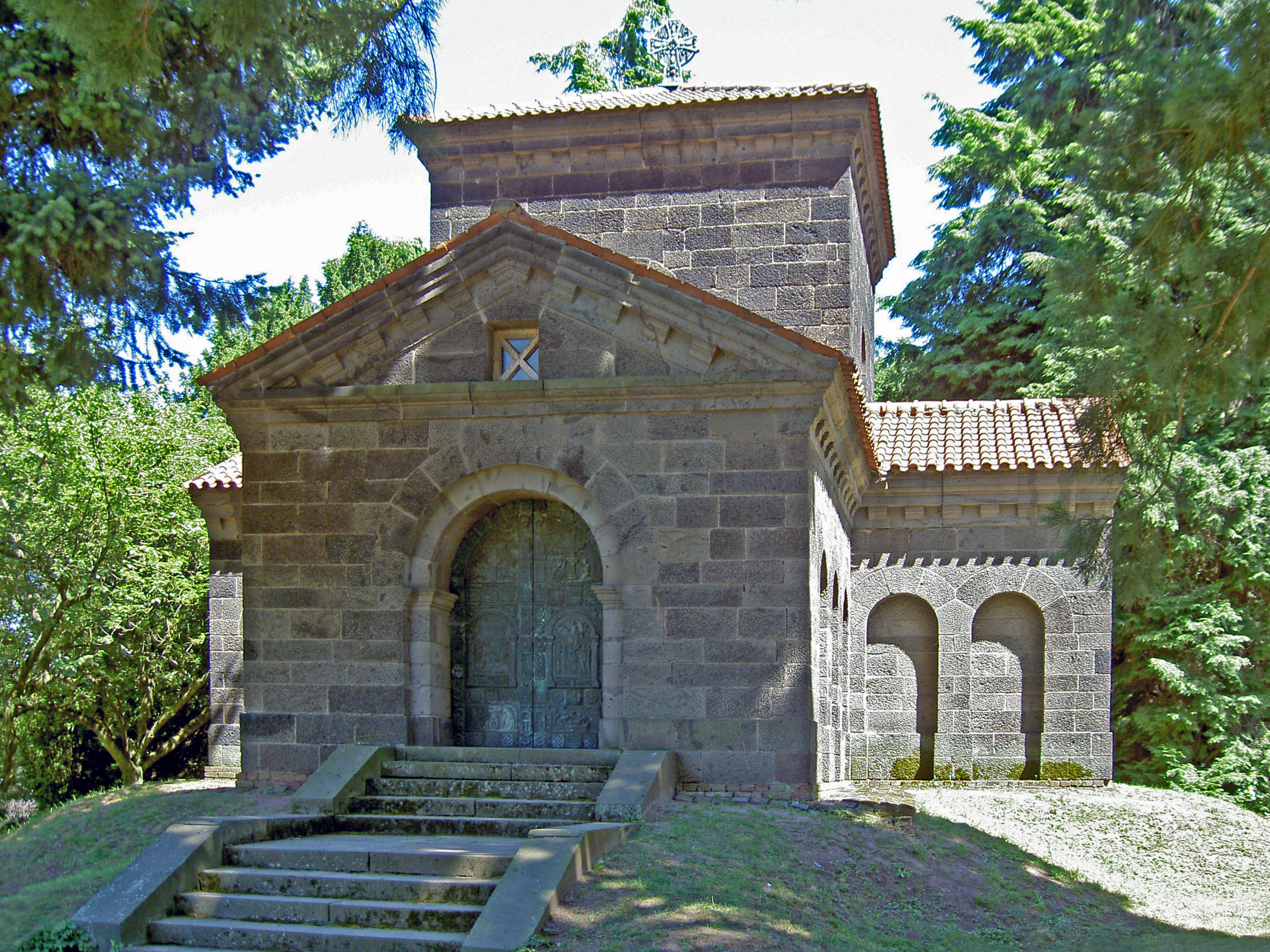
New Mausoleum

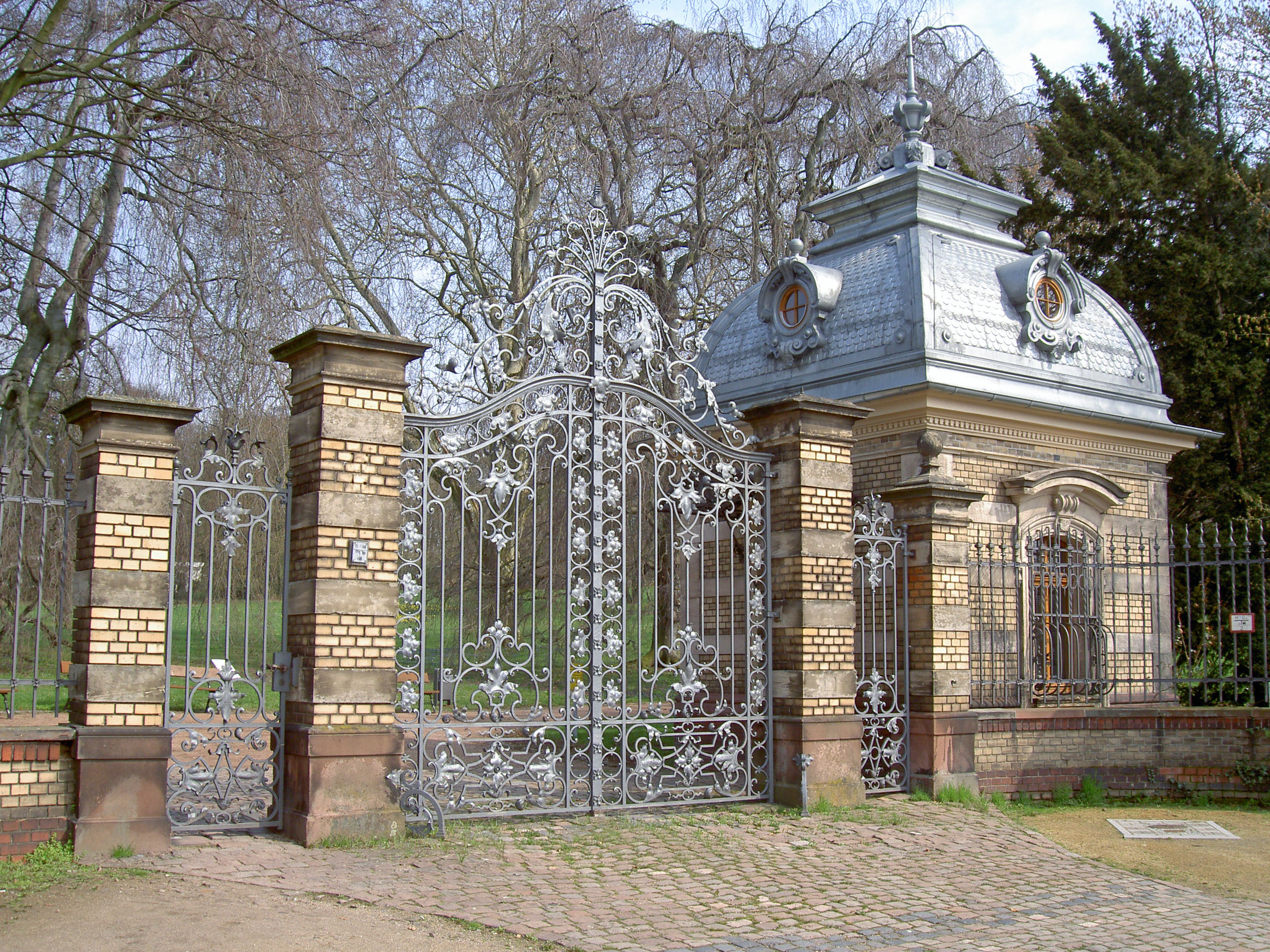
Gatekeeper's house or guardhouse

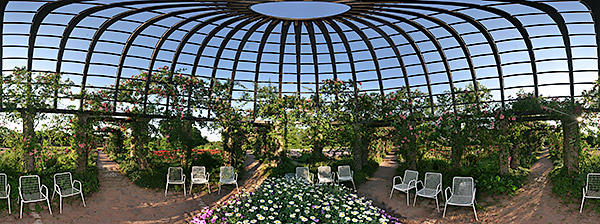
Inside the Rose Dome

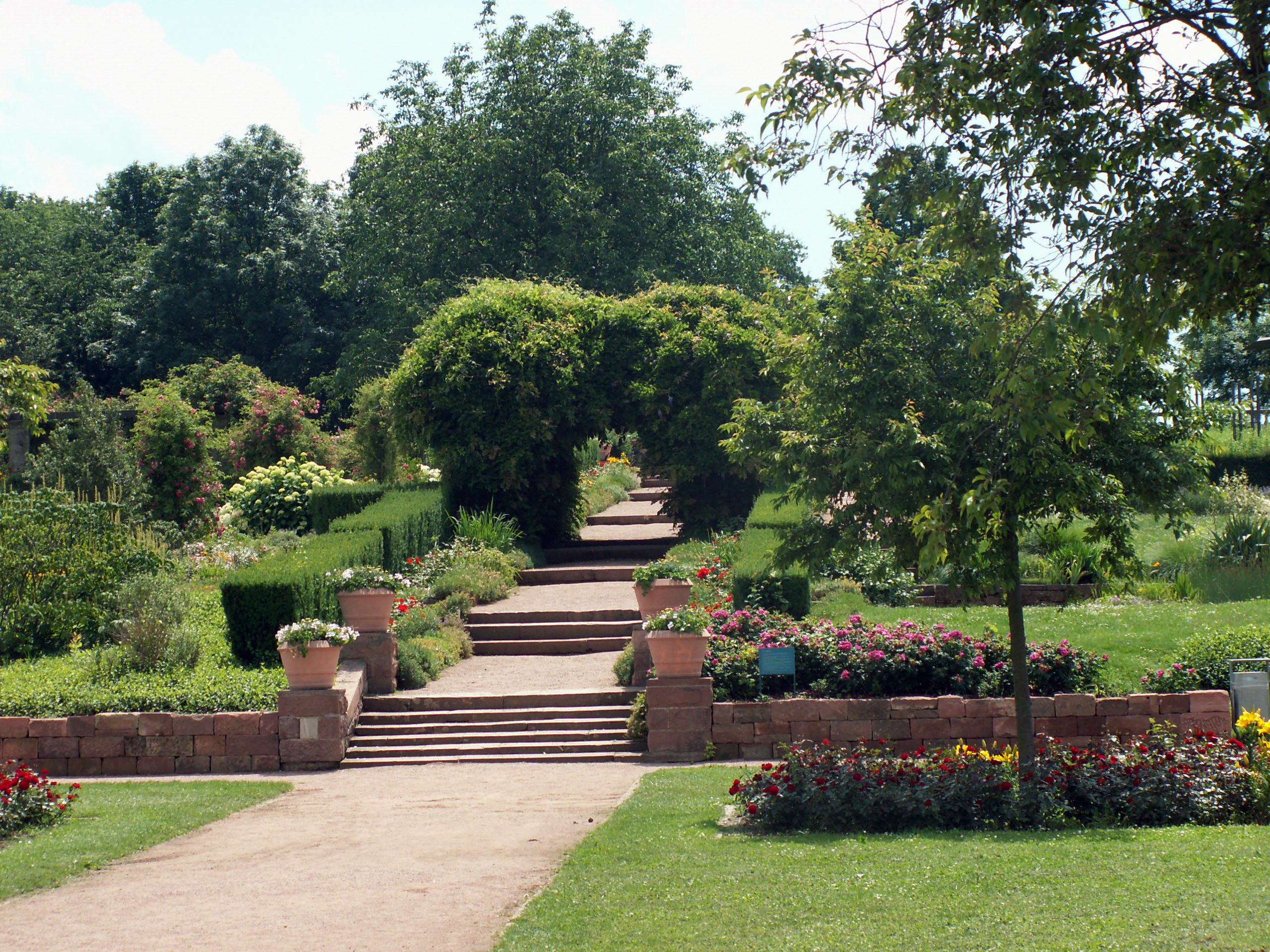
The Rosenhöhe in summer

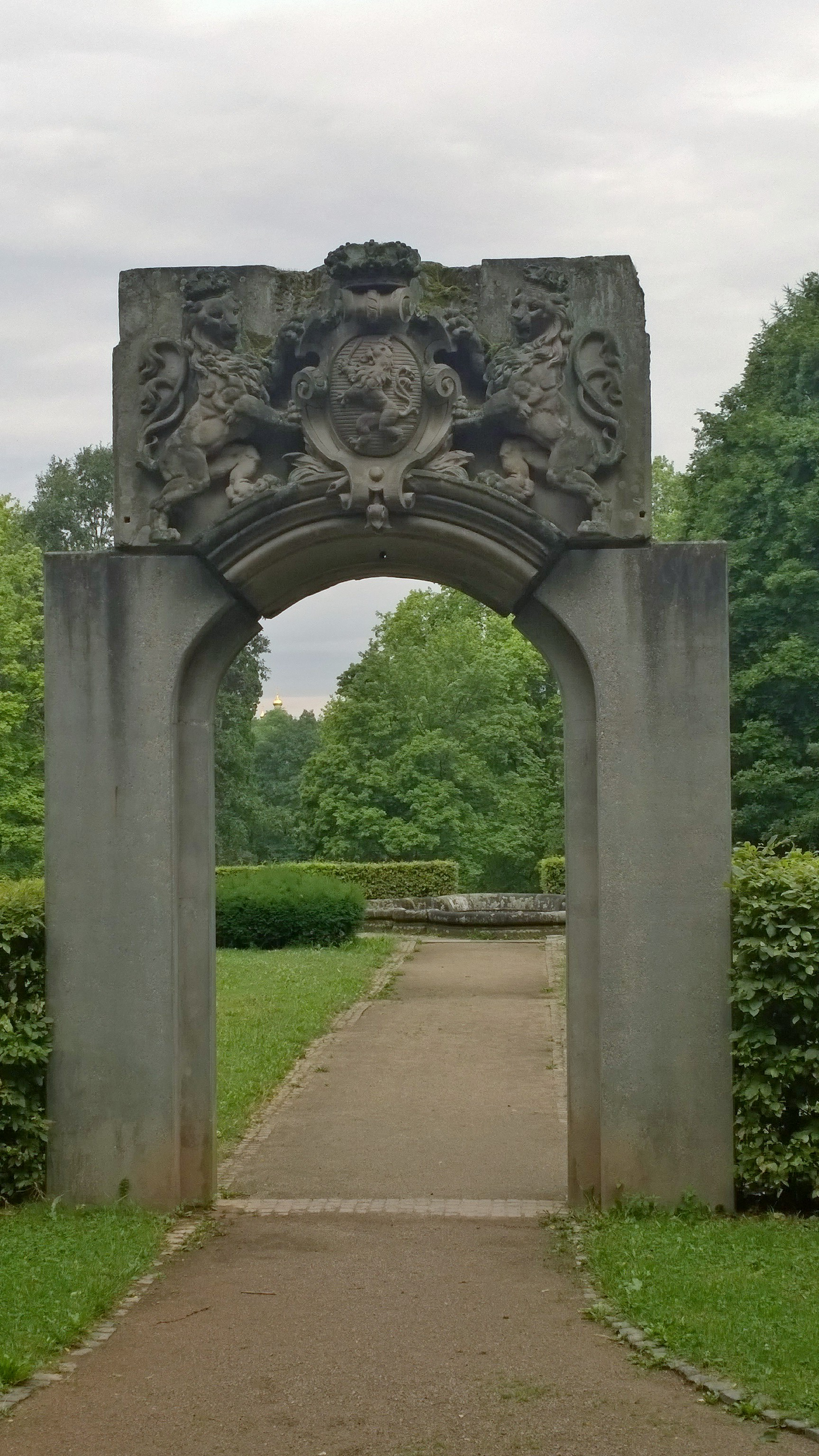
Gate with coat of arms at the former Rosenhöhe Palace

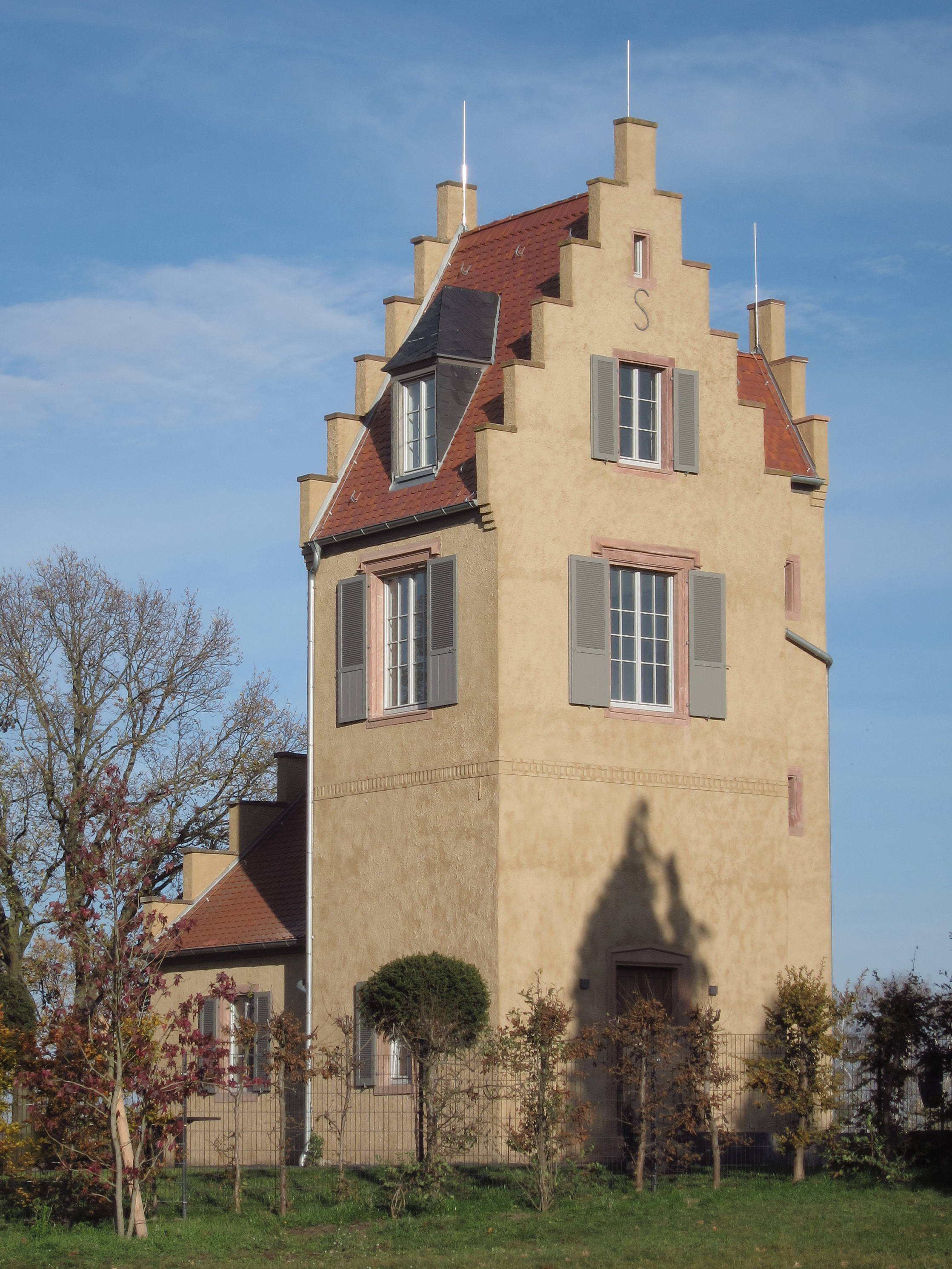
The Spanish Tower
