= Russian Chapel in Darmstadt =

Russian Orthodox church in Darmstadt, Germany

Coordinates: 49°52′35″N 8°40′01″E

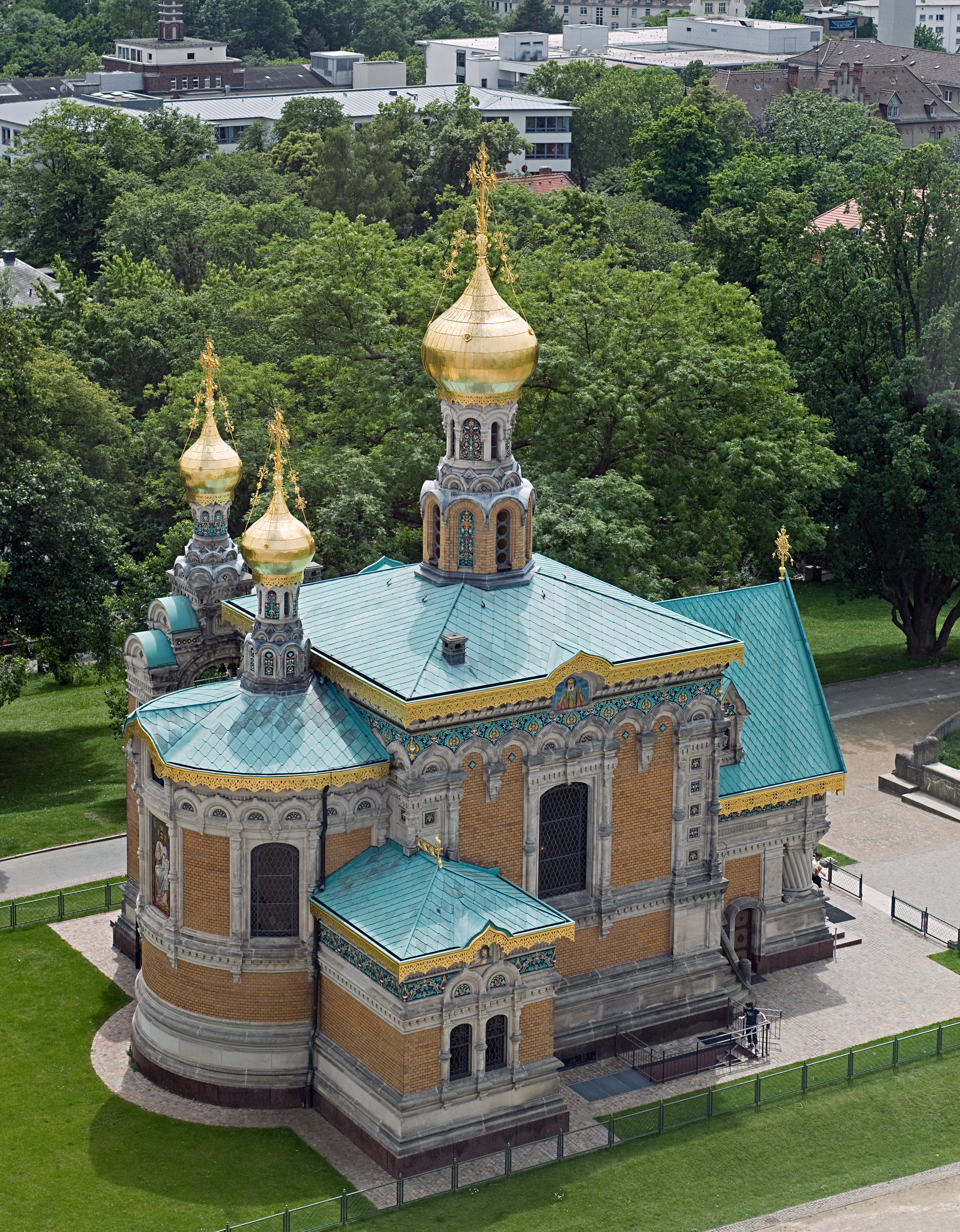
Russian Chapel

The Russian Chapel in Darmstadt, formally, the St. Mary Magdalene Chapel, is a historic Russian Orthodox church at Mathildenhöhe in Darmstadt, Germany.

The Russian revival style church with gold onion domes was built between 1897 and 1899 by the architect Leon Benois, and used as a private chapel by the last Emperor of Russia, Nicholas II, whose wife Alexandra Feodorovna was born in Darmstadt. It is named in honor of the patron saint of Nicholas II's grandmother, Maria Alexandrovna who was also born in Darmstadt. It was built of Russian stone and, as some people claim, built on soil from Russia brought to Darmstadt by train, and used during their lifetimes by the Russian Imperial family and court during regular visits to the Empress's childhood home and to her family.

Mathildenhöhe Darmstadt
Mathildenhöhe Darmstadt, Art Nouveau
House (build 1901)
House (build 1908)
1 Hochzeitsturm (wedding tower)
2 Exhibition Building
3 Russian Chapel
4 Ludwig
5 Deiters
6 Large Glückert
7 Small Glückert
8 Behrens
9 Olbrich
10 Habich
11 Keller
12 Upper Hesse Exhibition
13 Sutter
14 Ostermann
15 Vortex Garden
16 Platanenhain (plane tree grove)
17 Sabaisplatz (Sabais square)

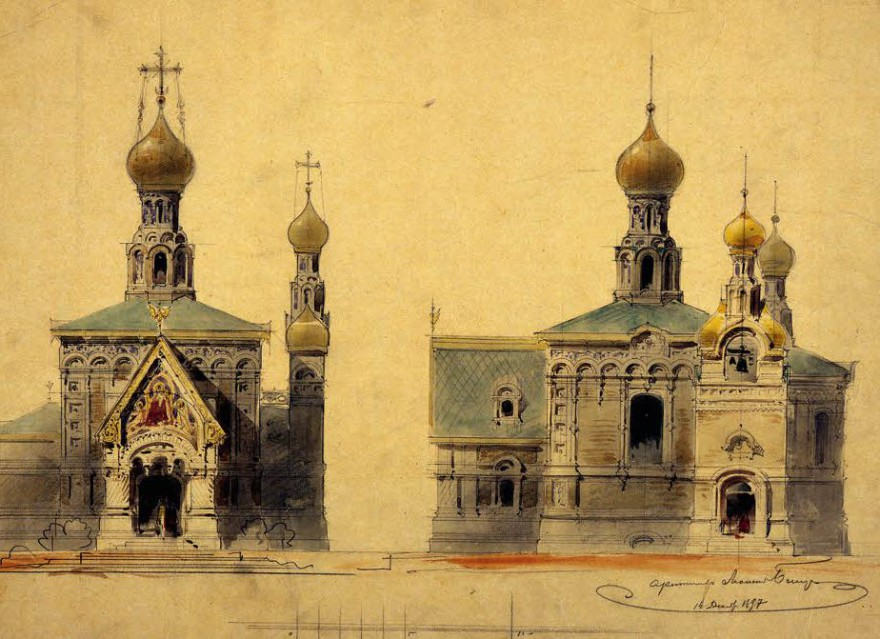
Russian Chapel drawing from 1897

== See also ==
- St. Elizabeth's Church, Wiesbaden
- Alexander Nevsky Memorial Church, Potsdam
- Russian Orthodox Cathedral, Vienna
- Russian Church, Geneva
- Alexander Nevsky Cathedral, Paris
- Russian Orthodox Cathedral, Nice
- Alexander Nevsky Church, Copenhagen
