= Fritz Osswald =

Swiss painter (1878–1966)

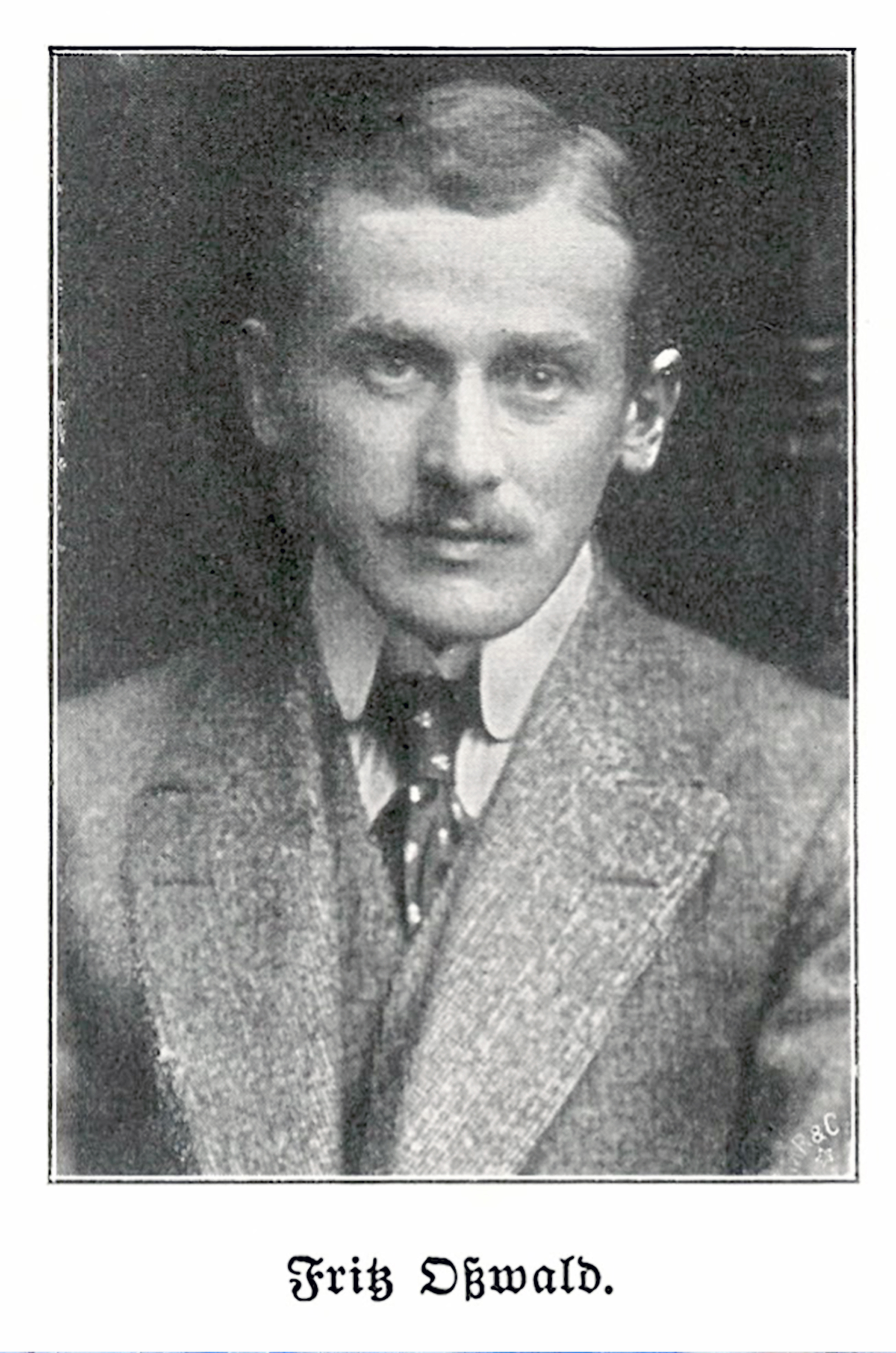
- Born: Friedrich Osswald; 23 June 1878; Hottingen, Zurich, Switzerland
- Died: 24 August 1966 (aged 88); Starnberg, West Germany
- Education: Academy of Fine Arts Munich
- Known for: Painting, graphic arts
- Movement: Post-Impressionism

Fritz Osswald (23 June 1878 – 24 August 1966) was a Swiss painter, member of the Munich Secession and of the Darmstadt Artists' Colony.

== Biography ==
Fritz Osswald was born in Hottingen (Zürich) on 23 June 1878. The son of sculptor Albert Osswald, he spent his childhood between Zurich and Winterthur, where he attended primary school; after a few years in a boarding school in French-speaking Switzerland, he enrolled at the art institutes of Zurich and Munich. In 1897, Osswald frequented courses by Wilhelm von Diez and Nikolaos Gyzis at the Academy of Fine Arts in Munich, and was awarded two medals of honour. From 1904, he was represented in Munich’s Secession exhibitions, where he encountered outstanding success, selling his first works to museums. Appreciated as an emerging artist – and compared by critics to well-established names – Osswald married in 1907 Elsbeth Leopold, who gave birth to their daughter Agnes Hildegard, known as Hilla, in May of the following year. The artist travelled extensively between Italy, Austria, the Netherlands, Switzerland, and the North and Baltic seas; until, in 1913, he was invited by Ernest Ludwig, Grand Duke of Hesse to become a member of the artists’ colony of Darmstadt, cradle and stronghold of the Jugendstil. Here Osswald, already well-known, decorated the formal reception rooms of the alta borghesia. With a private studio at his disposal inside the castle, he feverishly painted urban views, factories on the Rhine, vases of flowers, and large winter landscapes. By now at the apex of his career, the Swiss artist elicited enthusiasm in the most important German galleries – Munich, Hamburg, Stuttgart, Berlin, Heidelberg, Dresden. At the outbreak of the Great War, Fritz Osswald was summoned back to Switzerland to enrol for military service, from which he was afterwards discharged when he had passed the age limit. On his return to Darmstadt, he was able to take up his previously nominated position as Professor of Art. In 1919 he left the artists’ colony and departed for the outskirts of Zurich, before buying, in 1922, a large house in Starnberg, Bavaria. Here he lived with his family until his death, which passed on 24 August 1966, after years of continuous artistic production.

== Works ==
"I know that every winter morning, particularly on the coldest of days, he is out there, wearing thick mittens, painting behind the Hofgarten, or in Nymphenburg Park, or other places around Munich. His rendering of the winter scene as a symbol of our existence, where the light and icy atmosphere become a metaphor of fading life, are a particularity of his art".
(Art critic Georg Biermann in Velhagen & Klasings Monatshefte magazine, 1909.)

A post-impressionist painter, Fritz Osswald created thousands of large winter landscapes, snowy urban views and still lifes. Through intense collaboration with major art dealers like Ernst Arnold, and galleries such as Heinemann, Thannhauser and Brakl, he achieved critical and popular acclaim until the mid-1930s.
On the 50th anniversary of Osswald's death, "L'école des Italiens – Museo Immaginario" and Fondazione Poscio set up a large exhibition "Fritz Osswald – The sense of snow" in Domodossola (Italy) with over 70 paintings on show; Italian art publishers Umberto Allemandi & C. and Mme Webb released the catalogue in Italian, German and English. The same collection was on show between July 1 and October 8, 2017 in Cles (Trentino).
Paintings by the Swiss artist can also be seen at the Hessisches Landesmuseum Darmstadt, the Starnberger See Museum and the Fundaziun Capauliana of Chur (Grisons, Switzerland).

== Exhibitions ==
- 1904 Munich (Secession)
- 1905 Zurich (Künstlerhaus)
- 1906 Munich (Glaspalast)
- 1906 Zurich (National Exhibition of Swiss Art)
- 1909 Le Locle (Swiss Society of Fine Arts)
- 1910 Dresden (Ernst Arnold gallery)
- 1910-1929-1936 Munich (Heinemann gallery)
- 1921 Zurich (Kunsthaus)
- 1922 Munich (Thannhauser gallery and Brakl)
- 1936 Munich (Civic gallery)
- 1952-1954-1956 Munich (Haus der Kunst)
- 1977 Darmstadt (Hessisches Landesmuseum Darmstadt, Mathildenhöhe)
- 1979 Fürstenfeldbruck (Klostergalerie)
- 2006 Starnberg (Kreissparkasse and Civic gallery)
- 2013 Domodossola (L'école des Italiens – Museo Immaginario)
- 2016 Domodossola (Casa de Rodis)
- 2016 Domodossola (L'école des Italiens – Museo Immaginario)
- 2017 Cles (Palazzo Assessorile)

== Paintings ==
- Bach (bei Mittenwald)
- Blick vom Schneefernerhaus auf der Zugspitze
- Blick von Braunwald gegen Hausstock
- Bovalhütte
- Die Giumels von Preda
- Engadin im Winter
- Garmisch-Partenkirchen
- Kleine Tannen
- Matterhorn
- Murnau (Blick gegen Kochel)
- Piz Bernina und Piz Roseg
- Piz San Jon, 1917
- Porträt einer alten Frau in Tracht, 1905
- Schloss Tarasp
- Sellahaus mit Sassolungo
- Starnbergersee
- St. Christoph am Arlberg
- Tauwetter, 1910
- Verschneite Parkanlage
- Vor dem Matterhorn
- Winterliche Flusslandschaft mit Birken
- Zugspitze, 1916

== Additional literature ==
- Wilhelm Michel: Maler Fritz Osswald – München In: Deutsche Kunst und Dekoration: illustrierte Monatshefte für moderne Malerei, Plastik, Architektur, Wohnungskunst u. künstlerisches Frauen-Arbeiten, 24/1909, pp. 190–196 Digital version
- Georg Biermann: Ein Münchener Maler In: Velhagen & Klasings Monatshefte, 1909 Digital version
- Hermann Uhde-Bernays: Fritz Osswald – München In: Deutsche Kunst und Dekoration: illustrierte Monatshefte für moderne Malerei, Plastik, Architektur, Wohnungskunst u. künstlerisches Frauen-Arbeiten, 32/1913, pp. 86–94 Numerized version

== See also ==
- Munich Secession
- Darmstadt Artists' Colony
- Jugendstil
