= Hans Christiansen (artist) =

German artist (1866–1945)

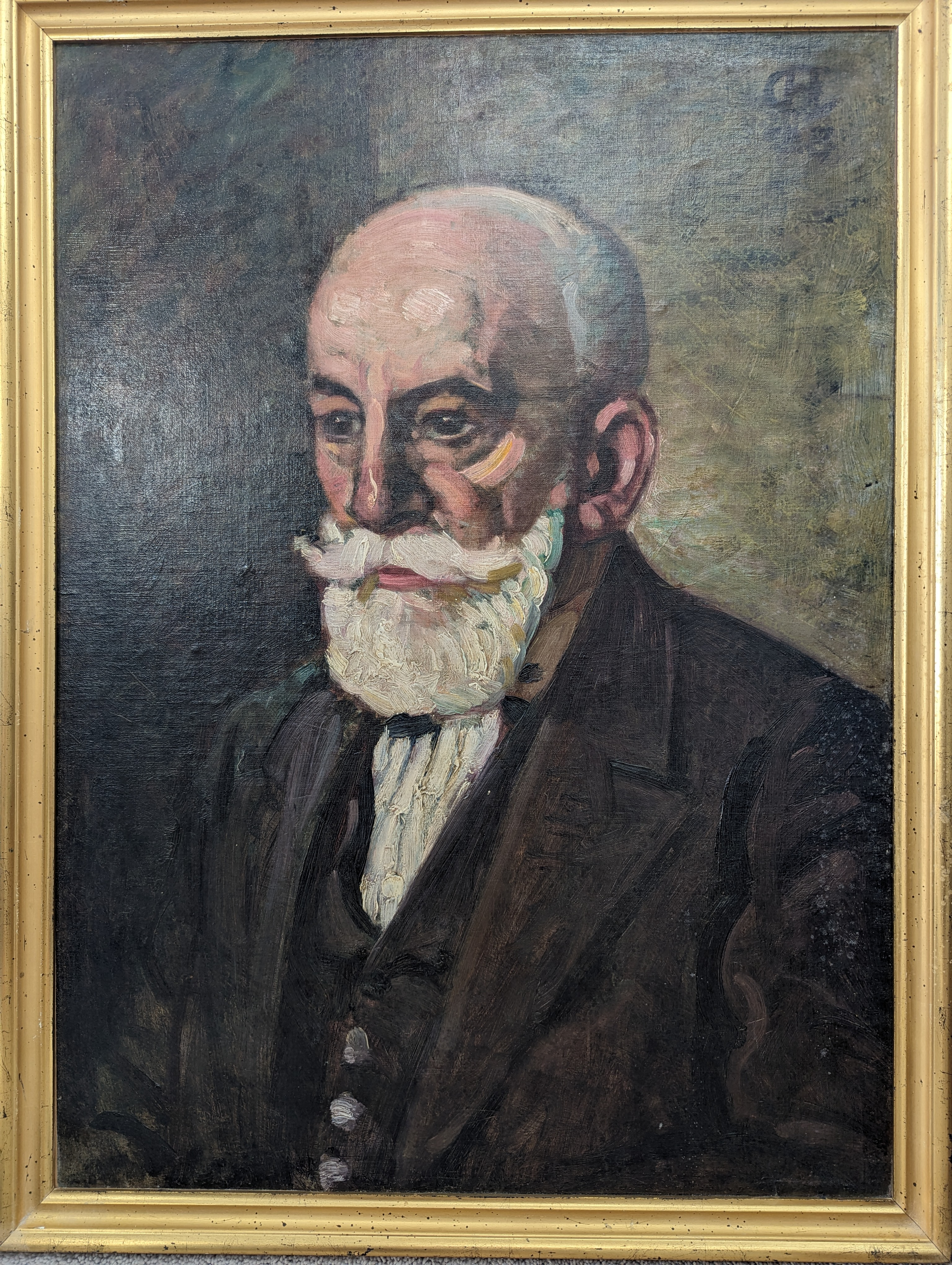
Portrait of brother in law, Albert Guggenheim

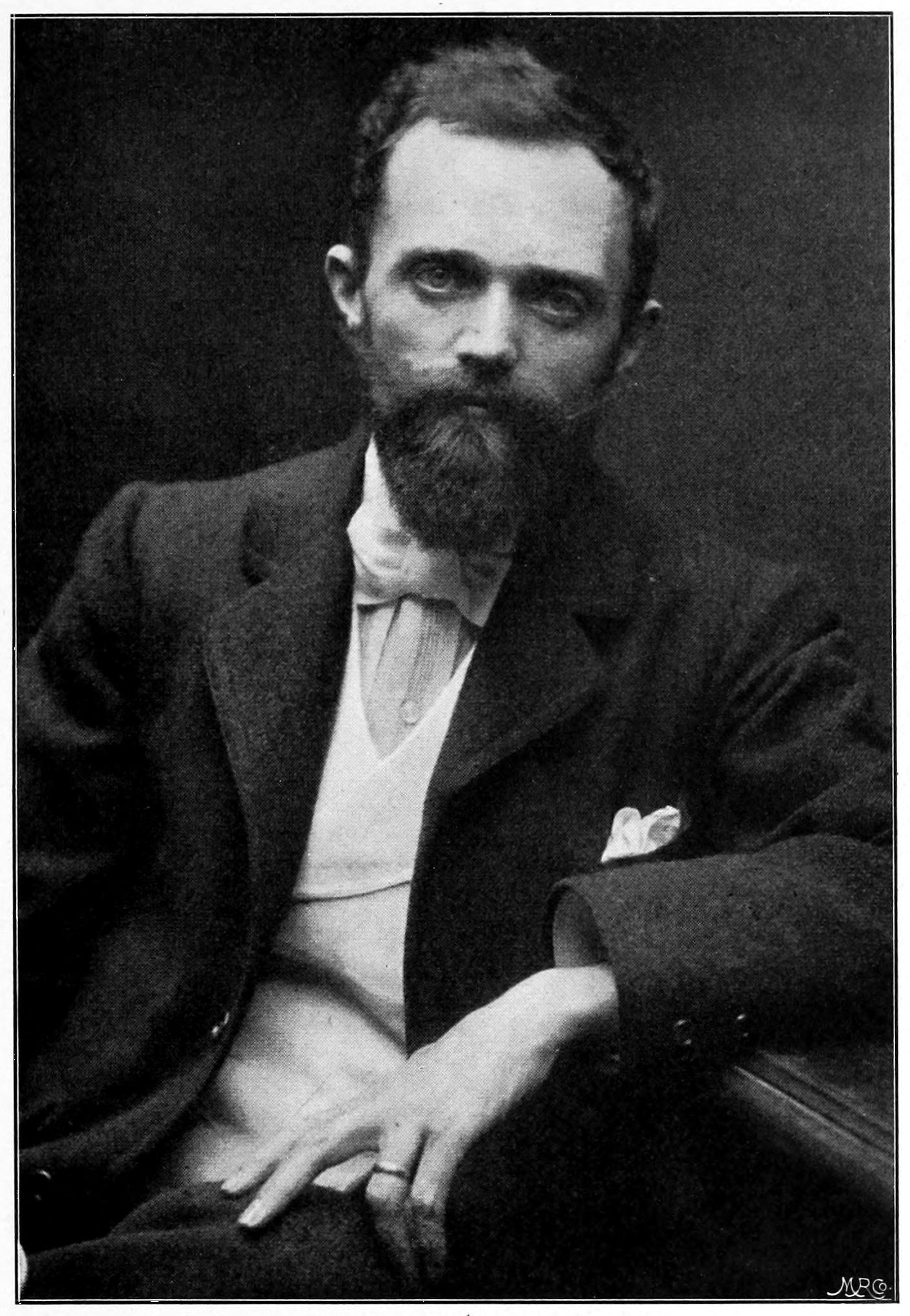
Hans Christiansen

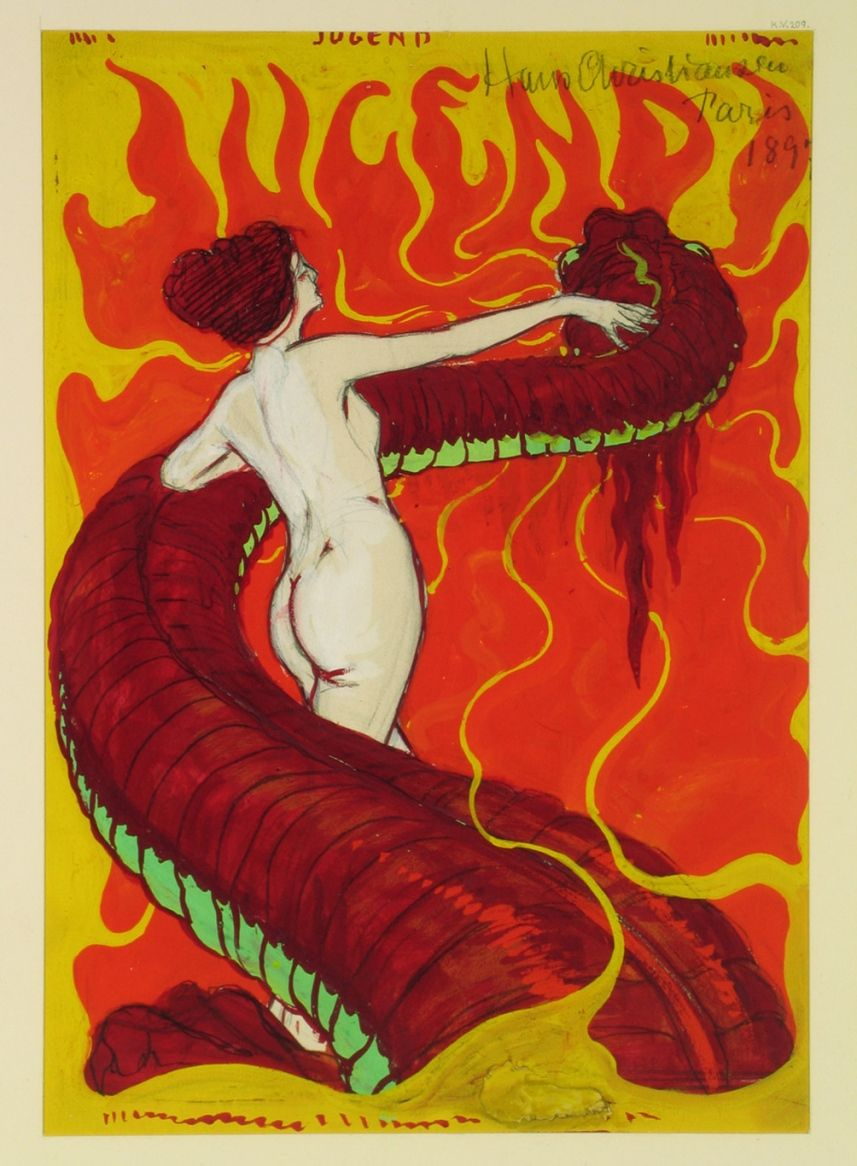
Andromeda, a sketch for the Jugend Magazine (1898).

Hans Christiansen (6 March 1866 in Flensburg – 5 January 1945 in Wiesbaden) was a German craftsman and painter of the Jugendstil. He was one of the founders of the Darmstadt Artists' Colony.
