= Albin Müller =

German architect and designer

Albin Camillo Müller
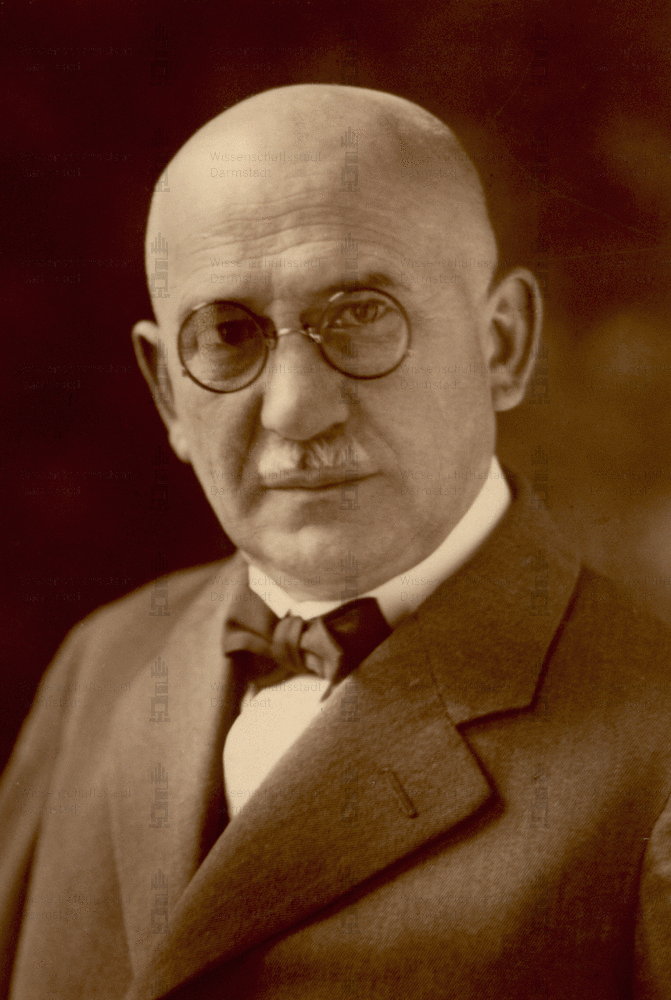
- Born: 13 December 1871
- Died: 2 October 1941 (aged 69)
- Other names: Albinmüller
- Occupation: Architect
- Buildings: Magdeburd Pferdetor, Löwentor in Darmstadt

Albin Camillo Müller (13 December 1871 – 2 October 1941), also known as Albinmüller, was a German architect and designer active in Darmstadt. In 1906 he was appointed to the Darmstadt Artists' Colony, where he became the lead architect after Joseph Maria Olbrich's death (1908). In 1907 he was appointed a professor, and from 1907 to 1911 taught Applied Arts. In 1918 along with Kasimir Edschmid, Albinmüller was appointed the President of the newly created Art Council in Darmstadt. In 1926, Müller was appointed architect of the Deutsche Theaterausstellung in Magdeburg. In 1934 he turned to landscape painting and also worked as a writer.

== Buildings ==
- Garden pavilion on the III. German Art Trade Exhibition Dresden 1906
- Exhibition buildings for applied art and exhibition buildings for architecture at the Hessisches Landesausstellung 1908 in Darmstadt (not preserved)
- Villa for the manufacturer W. Emmelius in Bad Godesberg, Rheinallee 32 (1910–1911)
- Own dwelling house in Darmstadt on the Mathildenhöhe, Nikolaiweg 16 (1911–1912, destroyed)
- Residential house Ramdohr in Magdeburg (1911–1912)
- Sanatorium Dr. Barner in Braunlage (Harz) (1908–1910 / 1911–1914)
- Residential house Prof. Dr. Wedel in Magdeburg, Humboldtstraße 14 (1912)
- Residential house Oppenheimer in Darmstadt, Paulusviertel, Roquetteweg 28 (1913–1914)
- Tomb cock in Magdeburg (1913–1914)
- Residential development on the Mathildenhöhe in Darmstadt, Olbrichweg (1913–1914, destroyed)
- Fountain and basin in front of the Russian chapel on the Mathildenhöhe in Darmstadt (1914)
- Schwanentempel on the Mathildenhöhe in Darmstadt (1914)
- Collapsible and transportable wooden house on the Mathildenhöhe in Darmstadt (1914; remaining unknown)
- Crematorium in Magdeburg (1919) (?)
- Double house "Neu-Ödernitz" (Holzfertteilhaus by Christoph & Unmack ) in Niesky, Christophstraße 11/13 (1921)
- Conversion of a business building for the Deutsche Vereinsbank in Darmstadt, Neckarstraße (1923–1924)
- Residential building (now "Bischof-Wienken-Haus") in Dresden, Tiergartenstraße 74 (1925–1926)
- Viewpoint tower with café in Magdeburg, on the Elbinsel Rotehorn (1927)
- Villa for Alois Winnar in Ústí nad Labem, Hanzlíčkova 4 (1930–1932)

== Monuments ==
- Löwentor in Darmstadt (1914, 1927 changed and translocated)
- Boelcke and War Memorial at the Ehrenfriedhof in Dessau (1921) (together with the sculptor Walter Kieser)
- Horse gate in Magdeburg next to Stadthalle (1927)
