= Paul Bürck =

German painter

- Born: 3 September 1878; Strasbourg, Germany
- Died: 18 April 1947 (aged 68); Munich, Germany
- Occupation: Painter

Paul Bürck (3 September 1878 – 18 April 1947) was a German painter. His work was part of the painting event in the art competition at the 1936 Summer Olympics.
