= Rudolf Bosselt =

German sculptor

- Born: 29 June 1871; Perleberg, Germany
- Died: 2 January 1938 (aged 66); Berlin, Germany
- Occupation: Sculptor

Rudolf Bosselt (29 June 1871 – 2 January 1938) was a German sculptor. His work was part of the sculpture event in the art competition at the 1932 Summer Olympics.
