= Holzhausenschlösschen =

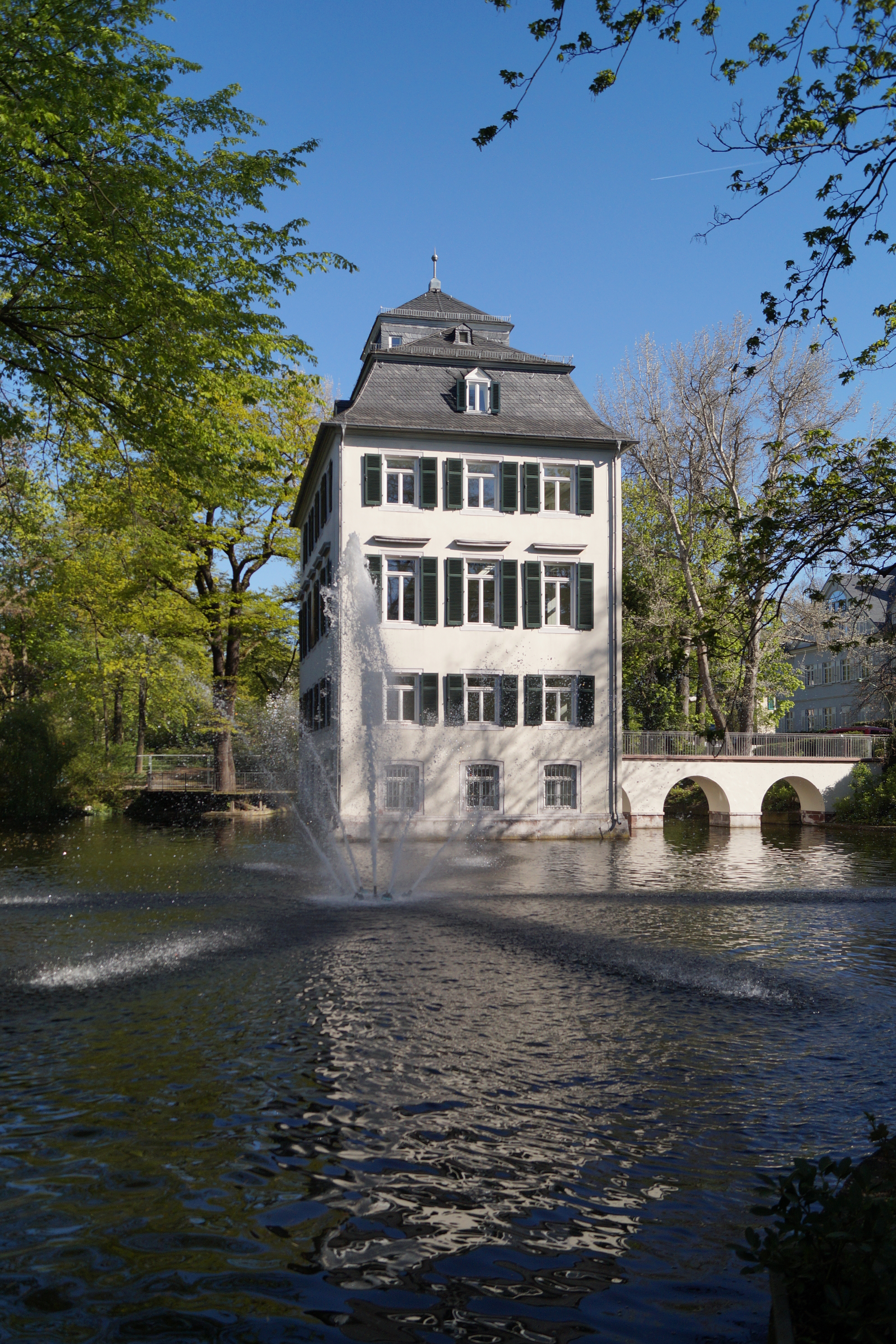
- Side elevation of the palace and bridge from the southwest.
- Interactive map of the Holzhausenschlösschen area

General information
- Type: Moated country house
- Architectural style: Baroque
- Location: Frankfurt, Germany
- Coordinates: 50°07′34″N 8°40′45″E
- Construction started: 1727
- Completed: 1729
- Renovated: beginning 2012
- Client: Johann Hieronymus von Holzhausen

Design and construction
- Architect: Louis Remy de la Fosse

The Holzhausenschlösschen (Little Holzhausen palace) is a moated former country house built by the patrician Holzhausen family on their farm, then just north of Frankfurt and now in the city's Nordend. The present building was completed in 1729, built for Johann Hieronymus von Holzhausen on the foundations of a moated castle from the Middle Ages after a design by Louis Remy de la Fosse. Today, it serves as a venue for cultural events.

== History ==
The palace (Note: In mainland Europe, the term "palace" denotes any large town house.) was built between 1727 and 1729 by Johann Hieronymus von Holzhausen (1674–1736) on the foundations of a moated castle from the Middle Ages. The Holzhausen family, from 1245 one of the most respected families of the free imperial city Frankfurt, owned the property called Holzhausen Oed since 1470. The term "Oed" (desolation) refers to the heath, then far outside the fortified city of Frankfurt. The family used the area first for farming. A moated castle was set in the then much larger Burgweiher (Castle pond). The castle was expanded in 1540 but destroyed in 1552 in the siege of Frankfurt by Maurice, Elector of Saxony.

In 1727 the present building was begun, commissioned by Johann Hieronymus von Holzhausen as a summer residence for his family after plans by Louis Remy de la Fosse. It was completed in 1729.

Due to the growth of the city in the 19th century, the palace is now in Frankfurt's Nordend, surrounded on three sides by the eponymous Holzhausenpark. The pond and the surrounding park were reduced and re-landscaped in 1910, when an allée of chestnut trees was planted. The vastness of the former park can be estimated by the position of an iron gate from the late 18th century, which remains as part of the former enclosure on the street Oederweg. The last male member of the Holzhausen family, Adolph von Holzhausen (1866–1923), gave the palace and the surrounding park to the city of Frankfurt. It then housed the Frankfurt office of the Reichsarchiv (de).

In 1944, the building suffered damage during air raids. The interior was restored in a simplified way. From 1953 to 1988, the palace was home to the Frankfurt Museum for Pre-and Early History. From 1989, it has been the seat of the community foundation Frankfurter Bürgerstiftung im Holzhausenschlösschen (de) which uses it for various cultural events.

Major reconstruction began in 2012, focussed on building a larger hall for chamber music, planned to be finished in 2014.

== Architecture ==
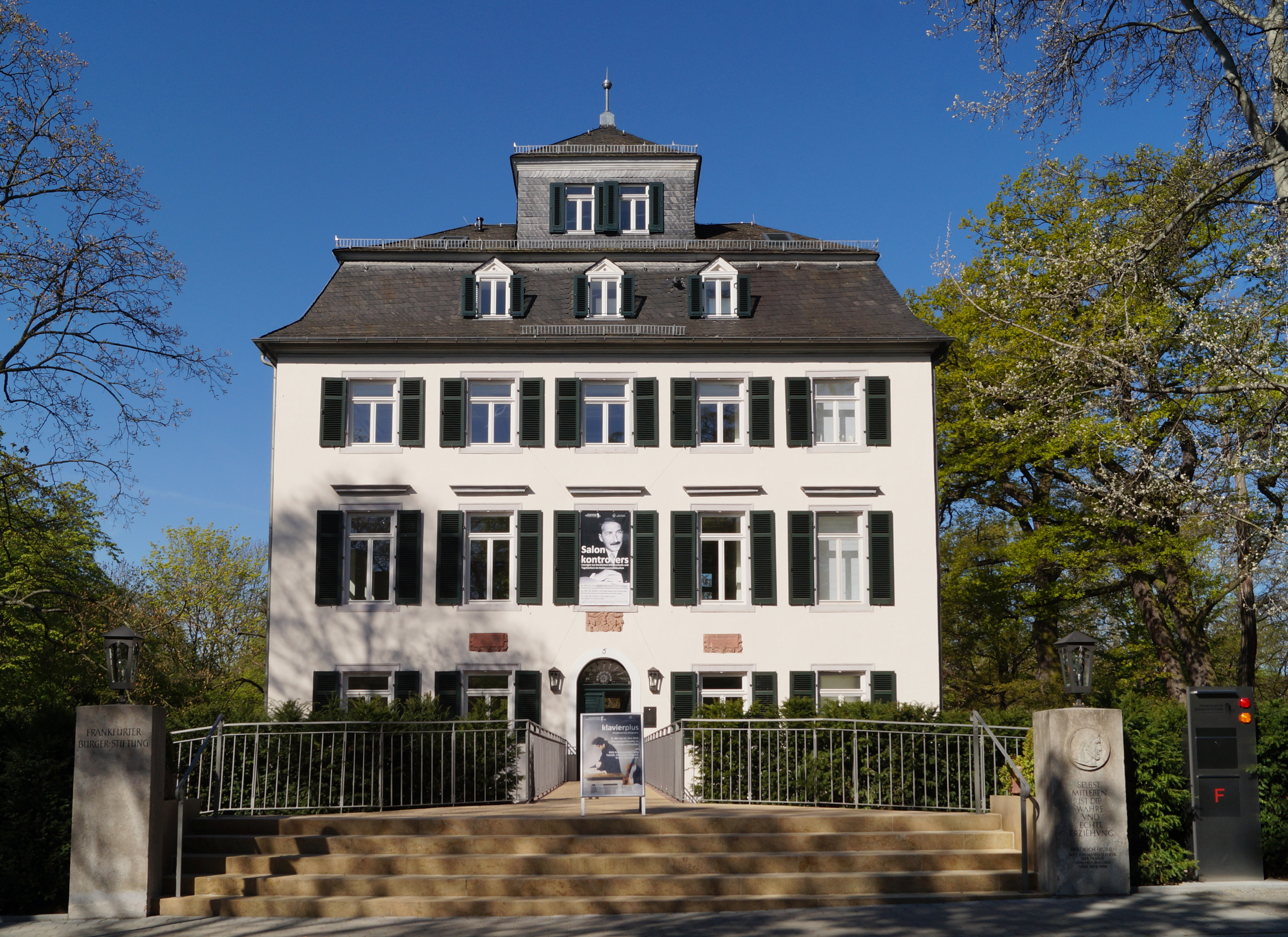
The principal façade

Johann Hieronymus von Holzhausen wanted a summer residence for his family, similar to those of the nobility. Holzhausen chose as his architect Louis Remy de la Fosse from Darmstadt, who died before the building's completion.

The architecture is a loose Flemish style seen throughout Scandinavia and the Low Countries, but less common in the western German states. The design is rectangular, with five bays on the longer façade and three on the narrow; the tall, narrow build, probably influenced by the constraints of the small, moated plot, shows a Dutch influence. At this time north and western German domestic architecture was influenced far more by that of the Low countries than by the ornate Baroque seen found further south, which tended to be reserved for churches and ecclesiastical buildings. The palace's hipped roof is in the Nordic style known as säteritak, and has dormer windows on the lower of its two levels and a belvedere structure on the upper; this is in contrast to the crow stepped gables more commonly employed in this form of design and gives the house an uneasy northern Baroque appearance.

The principal entrance, a segmental arch, is reached by a stone bridge of three spans. It probably replaced a drawbridge leading to the former building, and until World War II it was roofed. This entrance is possibly a remnant of a previous Renaissance building. It leads to the entrance floor, above which are the bel étage and another full floor. An additional floor is below the entrance floor, just above the water level.

A memorial stone at the entrance, created in 1940 by Egon Schiffers, commemorates Friedrich Fröbel, a private teacher of the Holzhausen family from 1806 to 1808.

== Literature ==
- Dehio, Georg (2008). Cremer, Folkhard; Wolf, Tobias Michael (eds.). Handbuch der deutschen Kunstdenkmäler. Hessen II: Regierungsbezirk Darmstadt (in German) (3rd ed.). München. pp. 281f. ISBN 978-3-422-03117-3.
- Schomann, Heinz (1986). Denkmal Topographie Stadt Frankfurt am Main (in German). Braunschweig: Vieweg & Sohn. pp. 183, 192–193. ISBN 978-3-528-06238-5.
