= Residential Palace Darmstadt =

- Residenzschloss Darmstadt
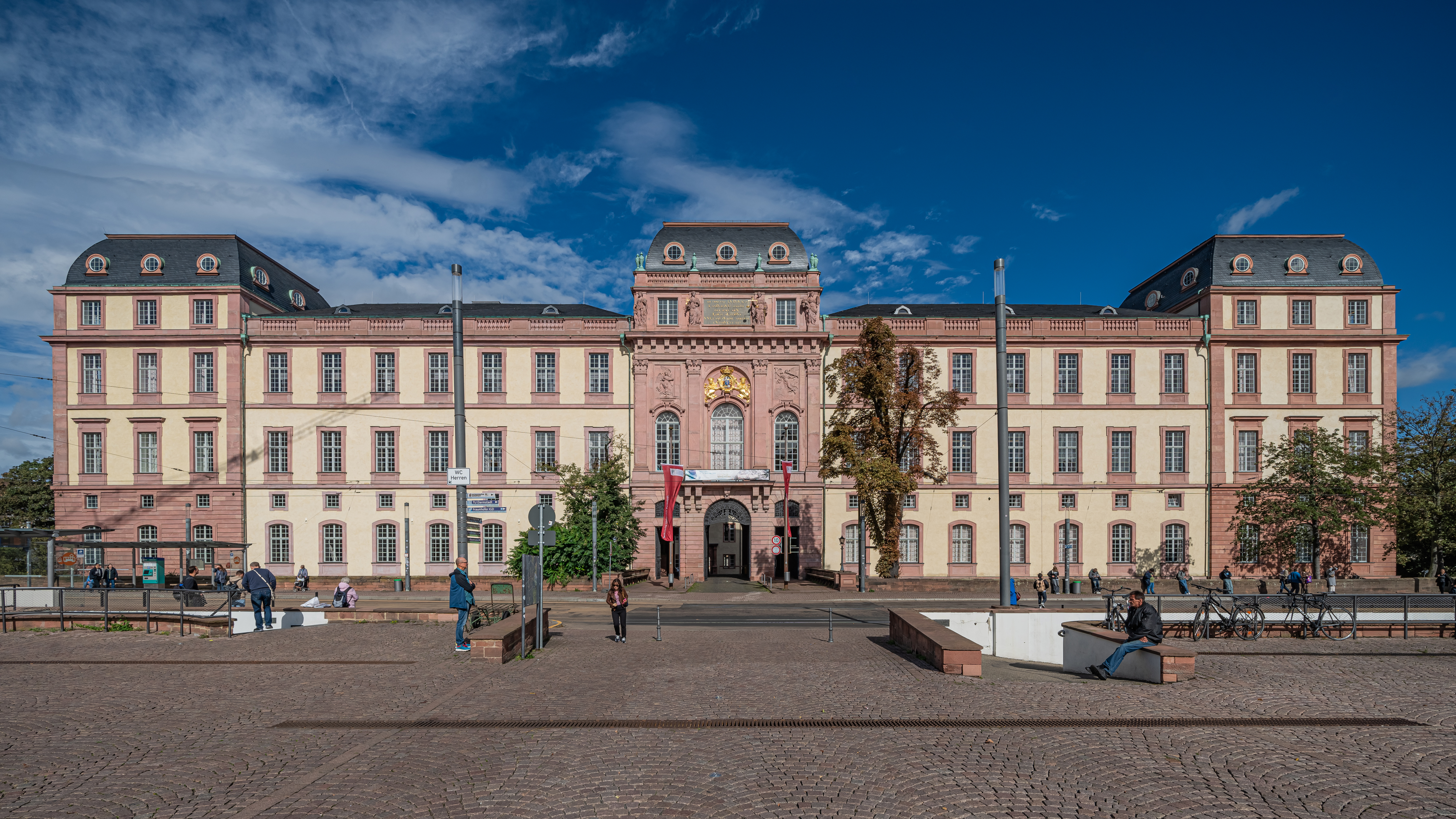
- The Residential Palace Darmstadt
- Interactive map of the Residential Palace Darmstadt area

General information
- Status: Rebuild
- Type: Castle, Palace
- Architectural style: Renaissance, Baroque
- Location: City centre, Residenzschloss 1 (Marktplatz 15), Darmstadt, Germany
- Coordinates: 49°52′25″N 8°39′19″E
- Elevation: 153 m (502 ft) (NHN)
- Current tenants: TU Darmstadt; German-Polish Institute; Landesamt für Denkmalpflege
- Groundbreaking: 13th century
- Construction started: 1567
- Completed: 1726, 1960s (rebuild)
- Renovated: 2008–2023
- Destroyed: 1518, 1546, 1693, 11 September 1944
- Renovation cost: €41-million
- Client: Counts of Katzenelnbogen; Landgraves of Hesse; Grand Dukes of Hesse-Darmstadt
- Owner: TU Darmstadt

Technical details
- Structural system: Old castle and Neuschloss
- Floor count: 3 (Neuschloss)
- Floor area: 23,000 m^{2} (250,000 sq ft)

Design and construction
- Architects: Moritz Lechler; Christoph Müller; Jakob Wustmann; Louis Remy de la Fosse (Neuschloss)

Other information
- Parking: Schlossgarage
- Public transit access: Tram, bus: Schloss

The Residential Palace Darmstadt (German: Residenzschloss Darmstadt, often also called Stadtschloss) is the former residence and administrative seat of the landgraves of Hesse-Darmstadt and from 1806 to 1919 of the Grand Dukes of Hesse-Darmstadt. It is located in the centre of the city of Darmstadt. The palace consists of an older Renaissance part and an 18th-century Baroque part.

As of 2023, the castle is the seat of the Technische Universität Darmstadt and the German-Polish Institute.

== History ==
=== Middle Ages ===
The origins of the castle lie in the Katzenelnbogen time. In the middle of the 13th century the counts of Katzenelnbogen built a moated castle in Darmstadt. In 1330 Darmstadt received town rights, one year later the castle is mentioned for the first time in a document. From 1386, the moated castle lost importance and became a widow's residence and secondary residence. In the following two centuries, the counts of Katzenelnbogen extended and rebuilt the castle again and again. Until the middle of the 15th century the castle was transformed into a representative castle and Darmstadt became Katzenelnbogen's second residence. What remains of the moated castle are the form of the central church courtyard and the outer walls of the manor house. When the last count von Katzenelnbogen died in 1479, Darmstadt fell to Henry III, Landgrave of Upper Hesse. When Philip I took over the government offices in 1518, the castle was destroyed for the first time in an attack by Franz von Sickingen. The castle was rebuilt in the following years, but with essentially the same defensive structures. During the Schmalkaldic War in 1546 it was destroyed again by imperial troops.

=== Renaissance era ===
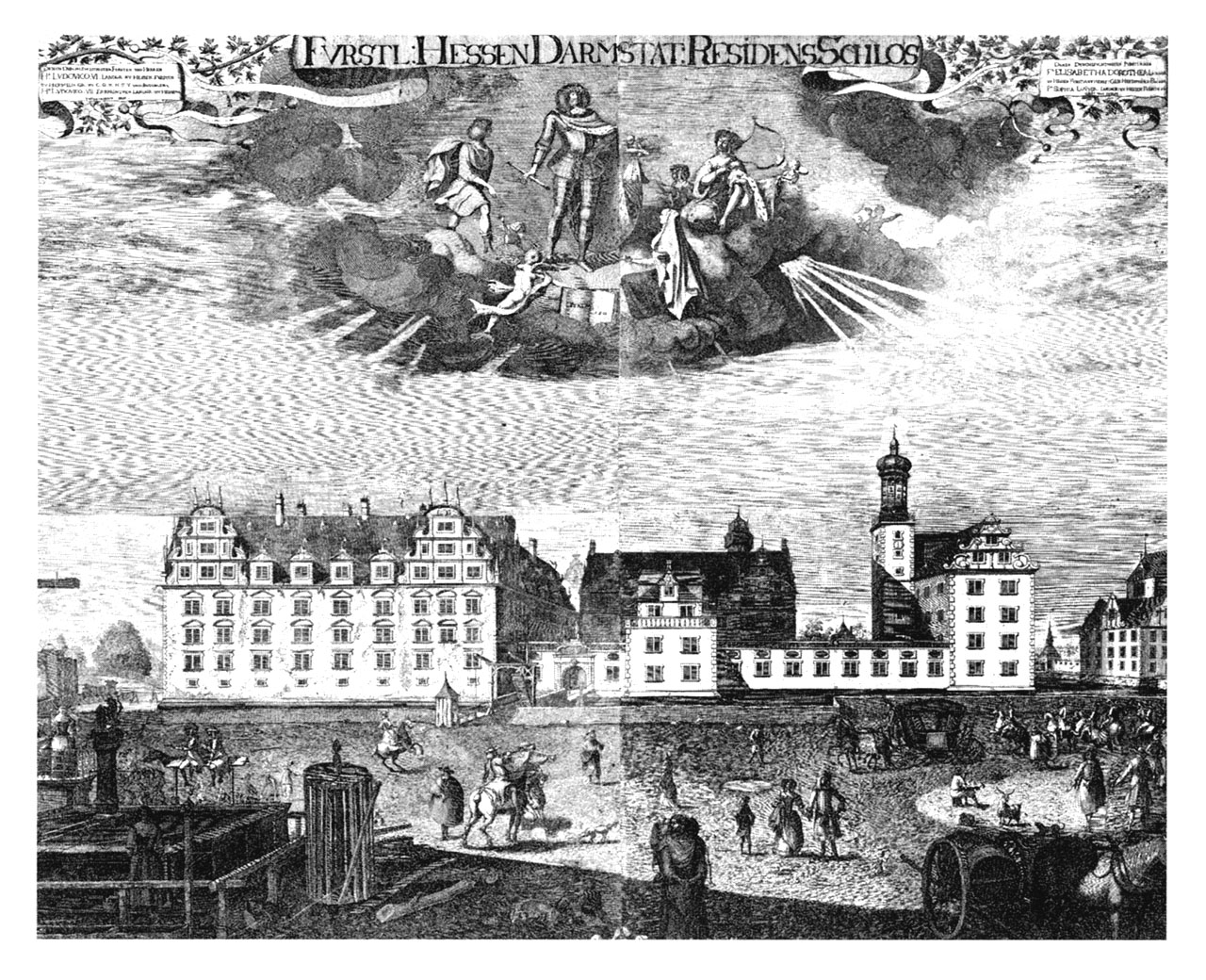
View of the Schloss from the South in 1676, copper engraving by Pieter Rodingh

Landgrave George I considerably extended the castle from 1567 to a Renaissance complex and secured it with moats and bastions. The half-timbered floors of the former palace and the hall are rebuilt from stone. The buildings received new roofs. Christoph Müller and Jakob Wustmann developed the old moated castle into a residential palace. After 1589 the office, the stables and the arsenal were built, which no longer exist today. From 1594, the landgrave had orphans educated in the castle. From 1595 to 1597 the Kaisersaal (Emperor's room) and the church were built. The tympanum corridor (Paukergang), which connects the manor with the church, was also built.

The Wallhäuschen, a gate building in the north of the castle, was built in 1627 by Jakob Müller. The bell building was built from 1663 to 1671 according to plans by the architect Johann Wilhelm Pfannmüller. The bells were delivered by Piter Hemony. Darmstadt was attacked by the French in 1693 and the castle burned down.

=== Baroque era ===
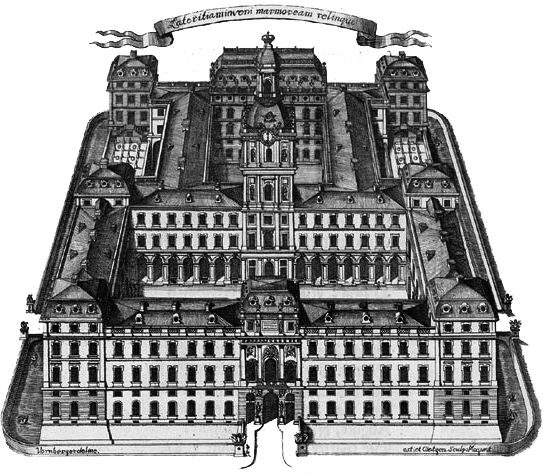
View of the planned palace from the South, copperplate engraving, c. 1728

Landgrave Ernst Ludwig commissioned the French architect Louis Remy de la Fosse to plan a new baroque palace with four large wings in 1715, after the palace's chancellery had burned down. This was to completely replace the old palace. Due to lack of money, however, only two wings were completed by 1726. These were to remain the last major structural changes to the castle. When Hessen-Darmstadt joined the Confederation of the Rhine in 1806, the castle became the seat of the Grand Dukes of Darmstadt. At the beginning of the 19th century, the upper floors of the new castle were furnished and fitted with window glazing. In 1842, the university and state library and the grand ducal collection with natural history cabinet moved in. Since the 18th century the castle has been less and less inhabited by the grand dukes and other members of the ruling family who settled in more comfortable premises, most of which were destroyed in World War II. These included the Altes Palais and Alexanderpalais on Luisenplatz, the Neues Palais and Prinz-Carl-Palais to the south, the Prinz-Georg-Palais to the north, and the Palais Rosenhöhe near the family's burial grounds in the Rosenhöhe Park to the east. Meanwhile, more and more institutions were admitted into the vacant old residential palace, and some of the rooms were reserved for state guests.

=== 20th century to the present ===
In 1893, under Ernst Ludwig, Grand Duke of Hesse and by Rhine, structural measures were again being taken. Thus the extension with a tea pavilion was built on the Herrenbau. In 1924, the castle museum moved into the old area of the castle.

After the World War I, the castle passed into the possession of the People's State of Hesse. On the night of the fire in Darmstadt from 11 to 12 September 1944, the castle burned down to the outer walls. Reconstruction began in 1946 and was not completed until the early 1970s. An overall repair was carried out in 2008, which is planned to last for a longer period of time. The bell construction was completed in 2016. The outer appearance was almost completely restored. As of 2023, the castle is the seat of the Technische Universität Darmstadt and the German-Polish Institute.

== Construction ==
Residential Palace Darmstadt
Residenzschloss (Residential Palace Darmstadt)
Renaissance castle
Baroque castle
1 Brückenhaus (bridge house)
2 Wallhaus (wall house)
3 Herrenbau (manor house)
4 Weißer Saalbau (white hall)
5 Kaisersaalbau (emperor's hall)
6 Kirchenbau (church building)
7 Glockenbau (bell building)
8 Prinz-Christian-Bau (Prince Christian building)
9 De-la-Fosse-Bau (west wing)
10 De-la-Fosse-Bau (south wing)
11 Kirchenhof (church courtyard)
12 Parforcehof (Parforce courtyard)
13 Glockenhof (bell courtyard)
14 Paukergang (tympanum corridor)
15 Bärenzwinger (bear kennel)
16 Wallbrücke (wall bridge)
17 Parforcebrücke (Parforce bridge)
18 Marktbrücke (market bridge)
19 Schlossgraben (castle moat)

The castle is divided into three areas: the outer fortification including Schlossgraben, the Renaissance castle and the Baroque castle (De-la-Fosse-Bau).

The north is occupied by a park that belongs to the old fortification. In its place was once the deep moat that completely surrounded the castle.

The centerpiece of the Residential Palace Darmstadt is the old Renaissance palace. It still has the almost triangular shape of the old core castle and consists of the castle wings Herrenbau, Weißer Saalbau, Kaisersaalbau, Kirchenbau and the church courtyard. In the southeast is the bell building.

The Baroque part of the castle (De-la-Fosse-Bau or Neuschloss) consists of a three-storey southern and west wing on an angular floor plan. From the town, a fortified gate leads directly through the baroque castle into the southern courtyard.

The usable area is 23,000 m^{2} (250,000 sq ft), owner is the Technische Universität Darmstadt.

=== Buildings ===
- Wallhaus (wall building)
- Brückenhaus (bridge building)
- Herrenbau, German-Polish Institute (manor)
- Weißer Saalbau, Schlosskeller, Department of History and Social Sciences (white hall)
- Kaisersaalbau (emperor's hall)
- Kirchenbau, Orgelsaal, Schlossmuseum (church building, organ hall, palace museum)
- Glockenbau with Glockenspiel, Schlossmuseum (bell building with carillon, palace museum)
- Prinz-Christian-Bau (Prince Christian building)
- De-la-Fosse-Bau, Library Department of History and Social Sciences, Executive Board of TU Darmstadt (Baroque castle)

=== Courtyards ===
- Kirchenhof (church yard)
- Glockenhof (bell yard)
- Parforcehof

=== Corridors ===
- Paukergang

=== Bridges ===
- Wallbrücke (wall bridge, north entrance)
- Marktbrücke (south main entrance)
- Parforce-Brücke (west entrance)

=== Outer fortifications ===
- Schlossgraben (castle moat)

== Location ==
The castle is located in the centre of Darmstadt. Nearby are the Marktplatz (market square) and Altes Rathaus (town hall) in the South. The Hessisches Landesmuseum Darmstadt by Alfred Messel, the neoclassical former court theatre Haus der Geschichte Darmstadt (House of History) by Georg Moller, the square Karolinenplatz are situated in the North. The square Friedensplatz and street Rheinstraße are located in the West.

City Centre Darmstadt
City Centre Darmstadt
1 Residential Palace Darmstadt
2 Hessisches Landesmuseum Darmstadt
3 Haus der Geschichte (former court theatre)
4 Audimax TU Darmstadt (largest lecture hall)
5 Kongresszentrum darmstadtium (congress centre)
6 Altes Rathaus (former town hall)
7 Luisenplatz
8 Friedensplatz (peace square)
9 Karolinenplatz
10 Marktplatz (market square)
11 Herrngarten (urban park)

== Gallery ==
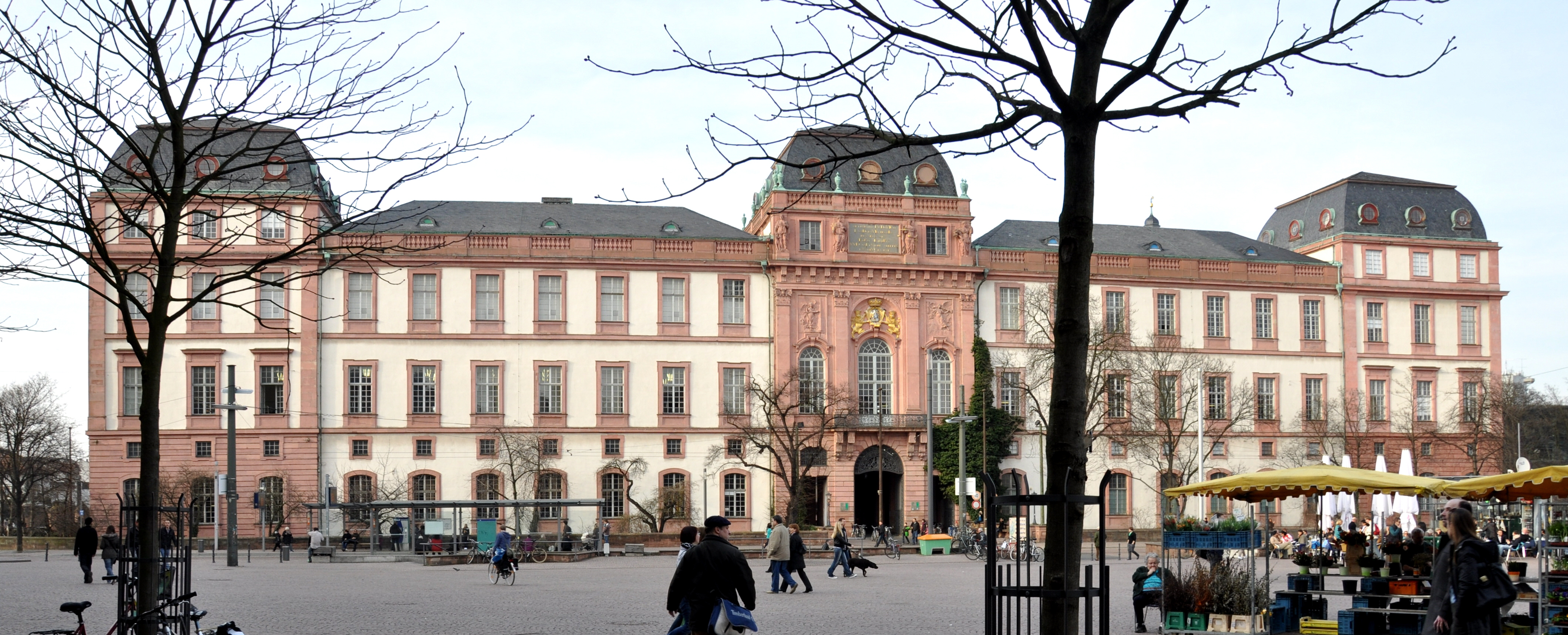
The castle and market square seen from the South
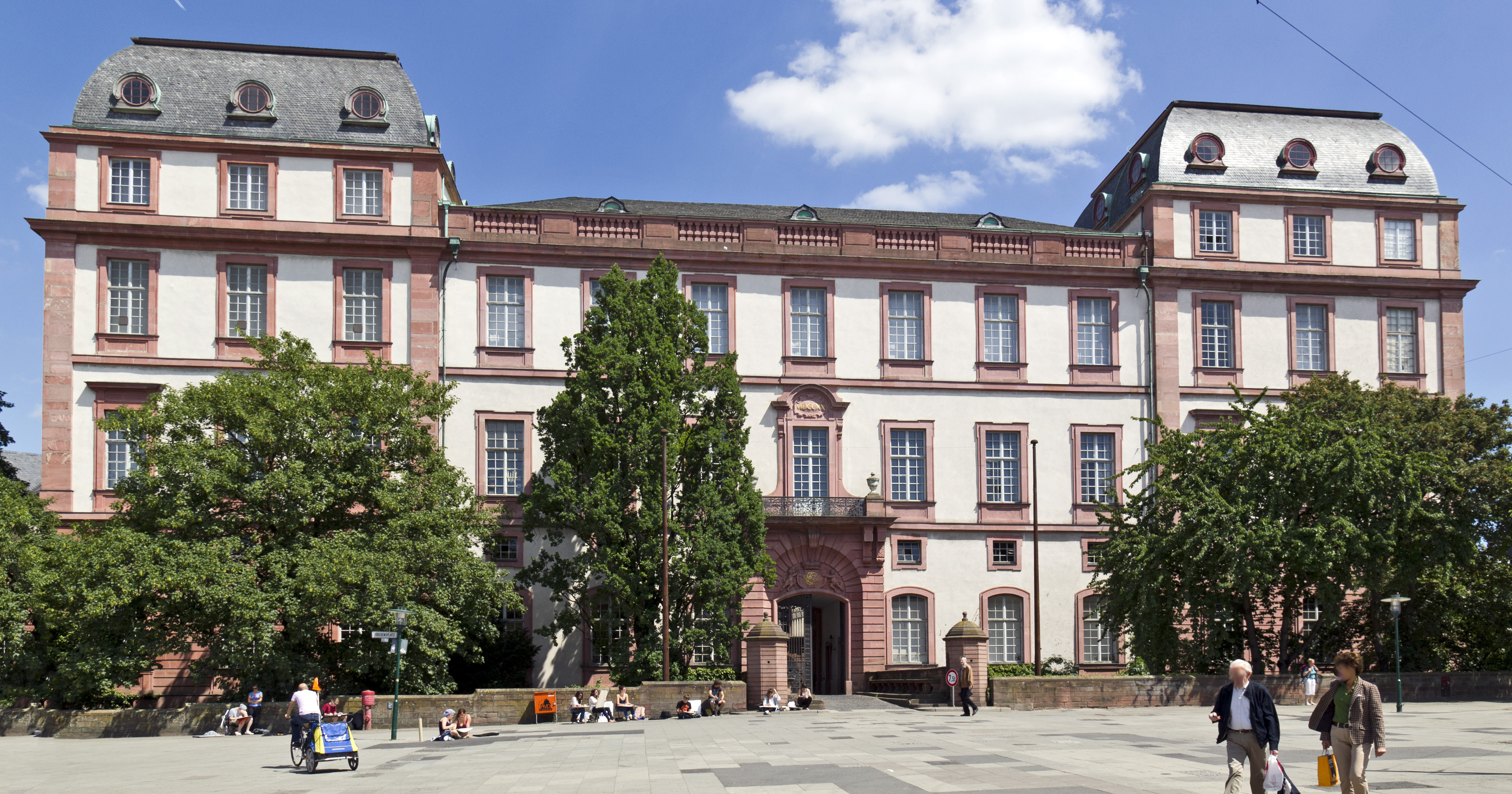
The castle seen from the West

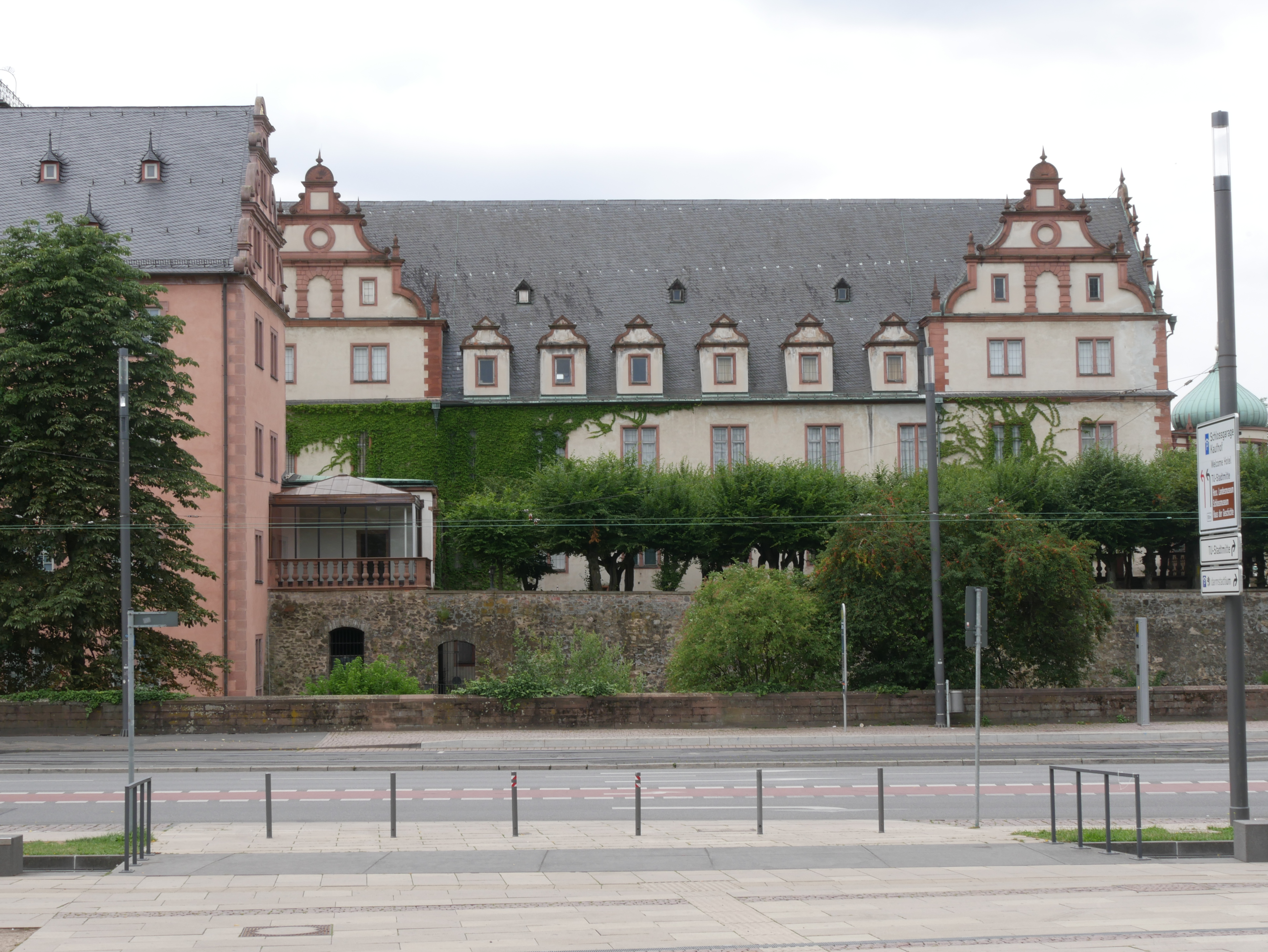
The castle seen from the East, Kirchenbau

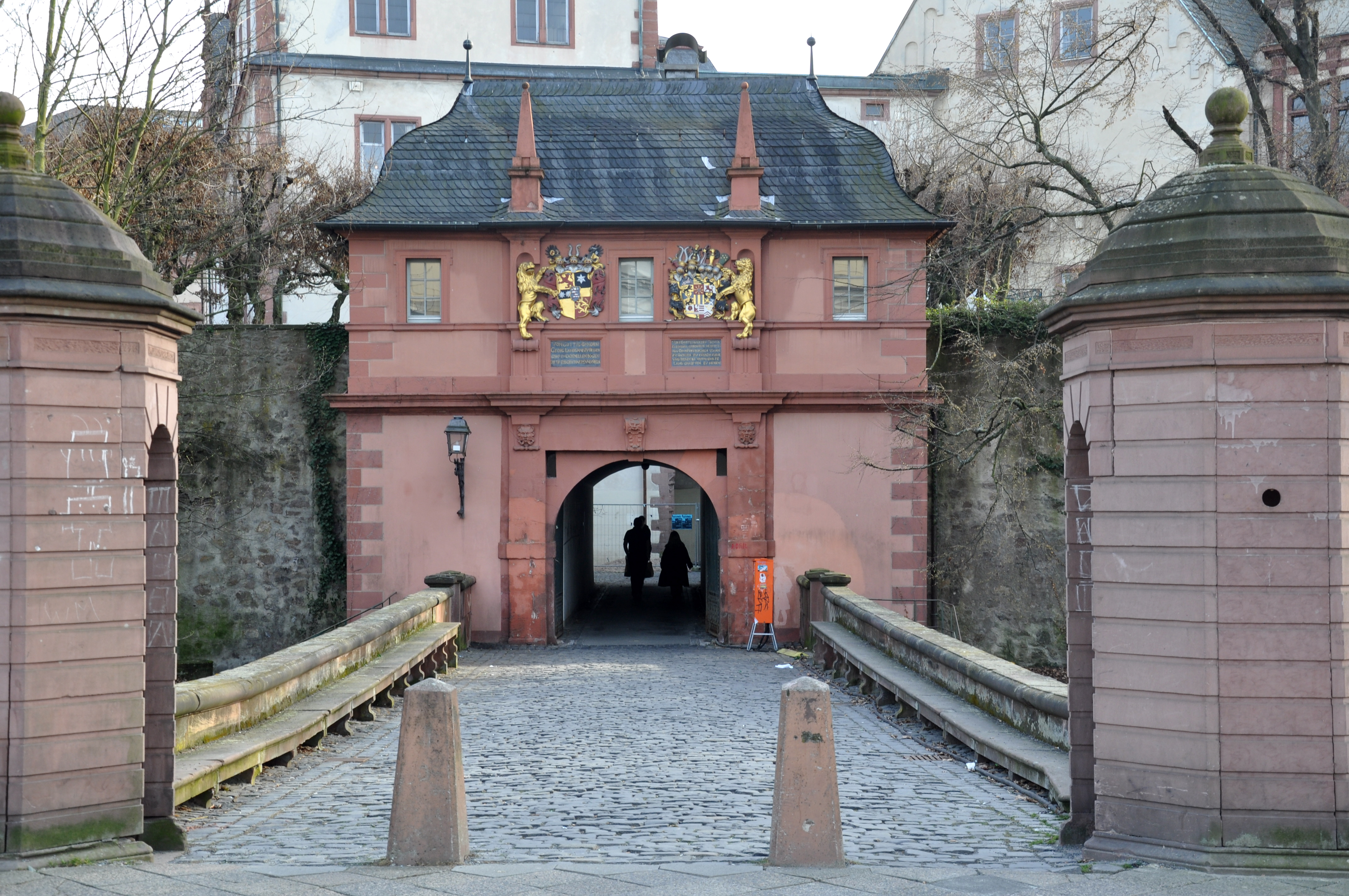
Brückenhaus and Wallbrücke seen from the North

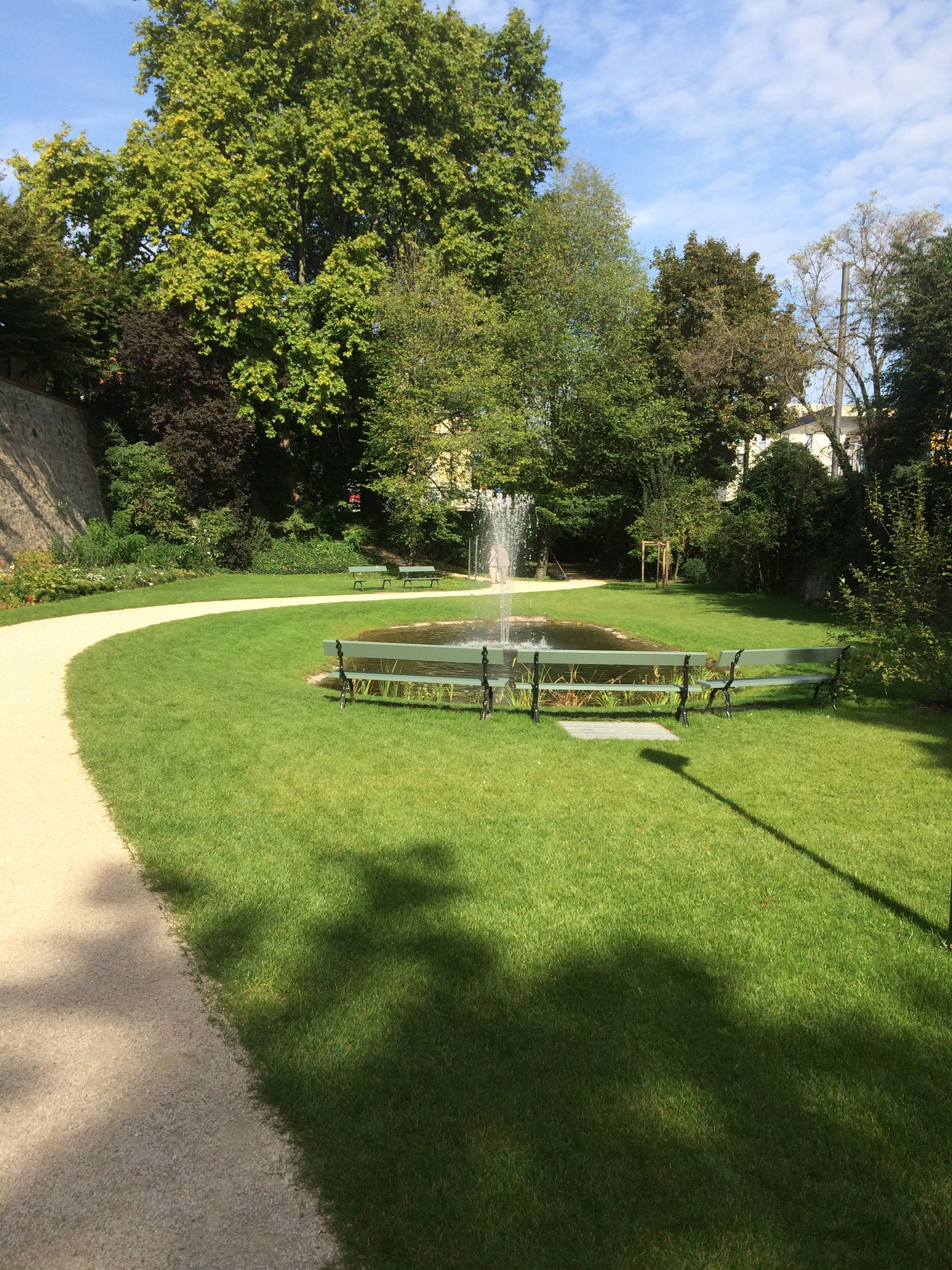
Schlossgraben (castle moat) in 2014

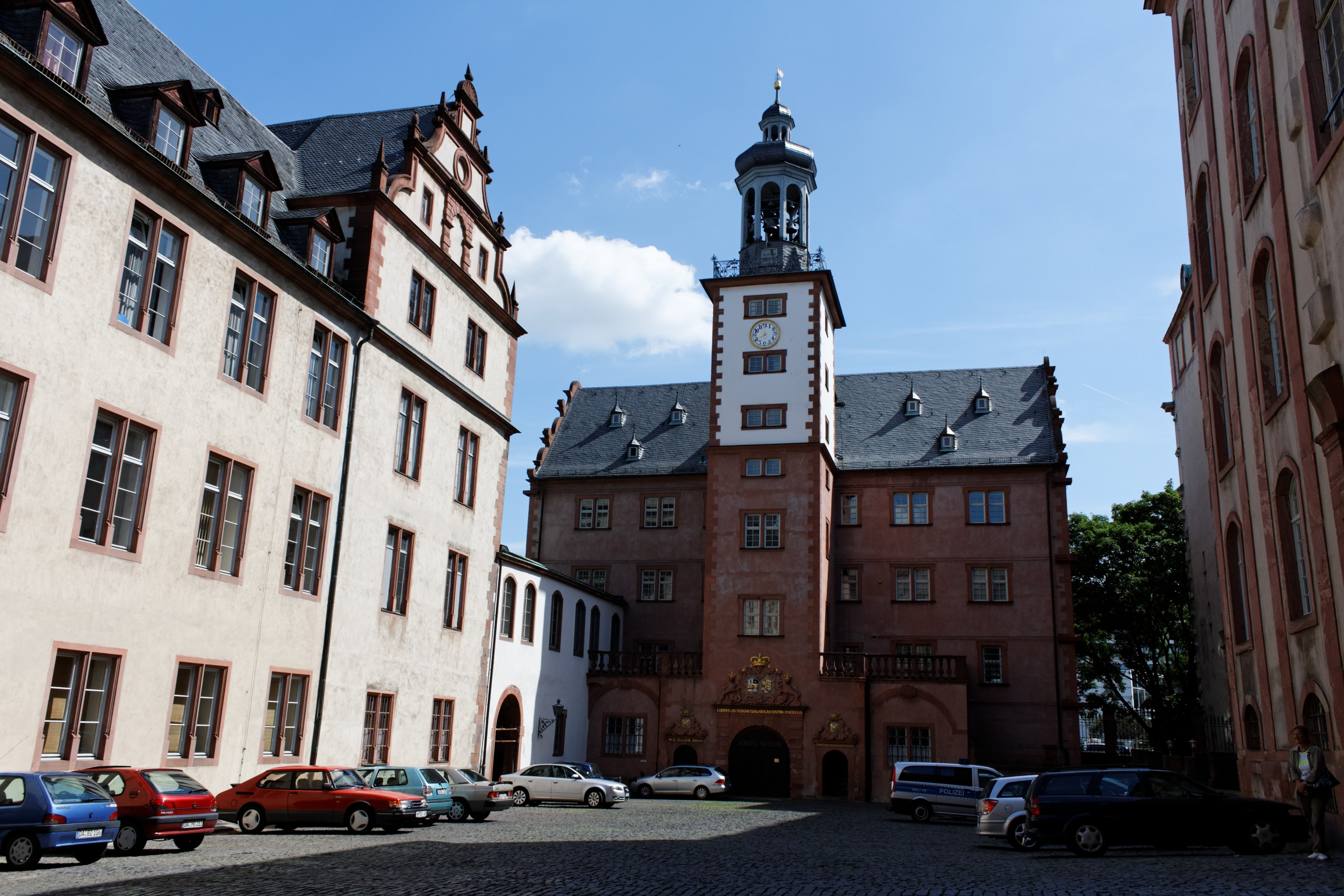
Glockenbau and Glockenhof

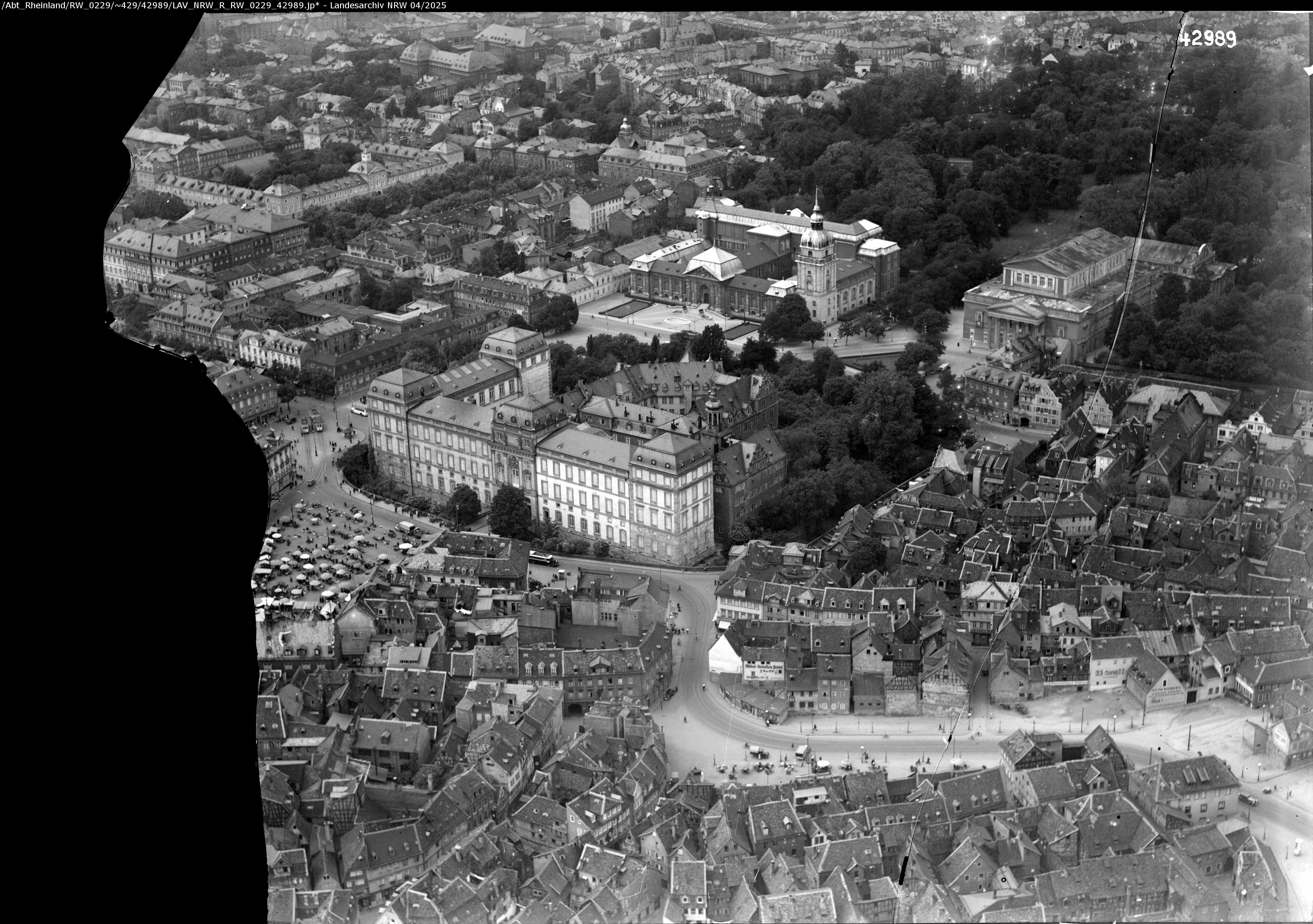
Aerial view with the Old Town of Darmstadt and the castle in the centre, 1936

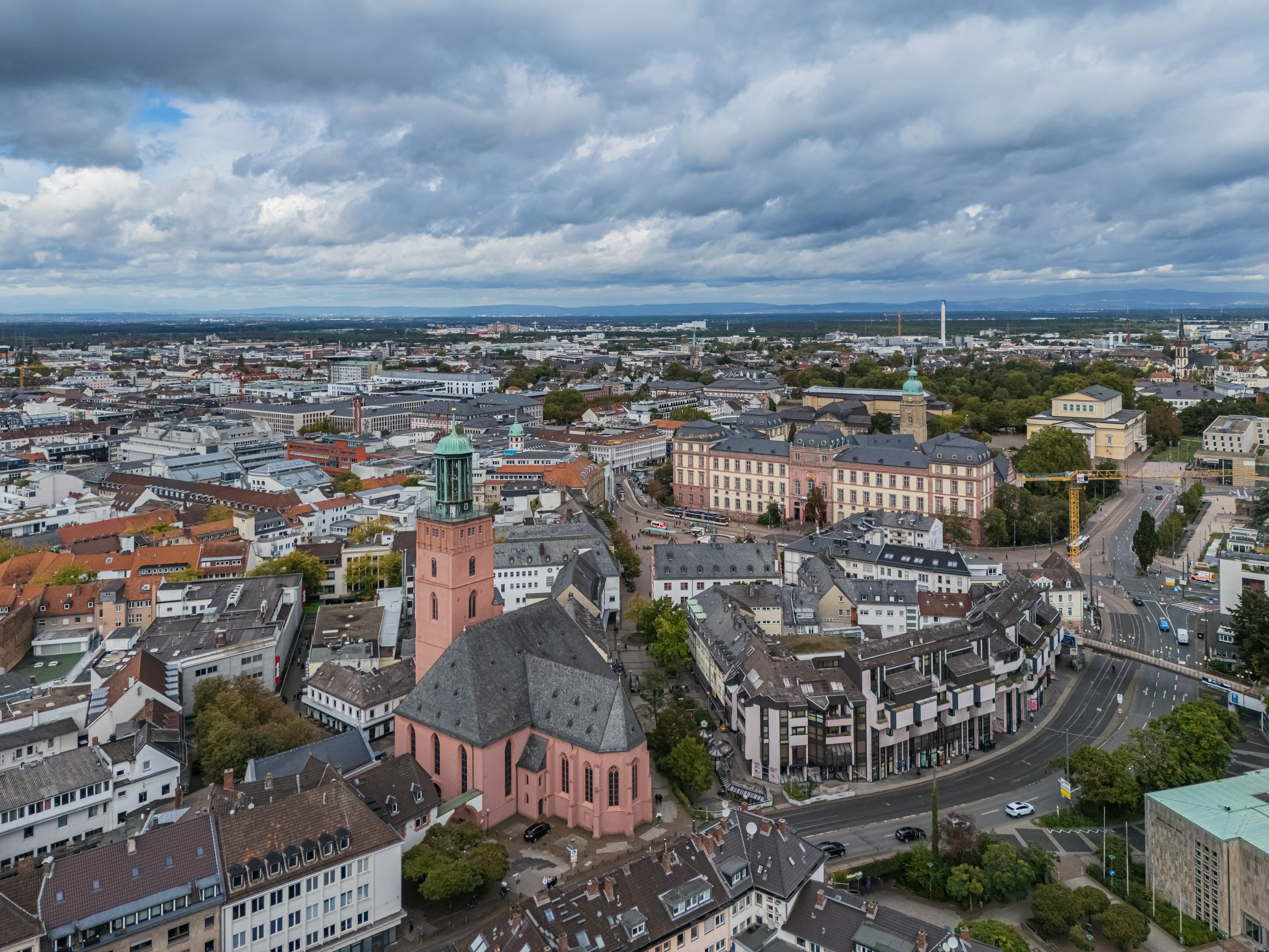
Aerial view with the City Church and the castle in the centre, 2024

== Schlossmuseum ==
The palace museum shows objects belonging to the former landgraves and Grand Dukes of Hesse-Darmstadt. Opened in 1924, the museum is located in the bell and church building of the residential palace.

== Schlosskeller ==
The Schlosskeller is an event location and a club in the basement of the castle. Since 1966, the club has been run by students.

== Music festival Schlossgrabenfest ==
Since 1999 the Schlossgrabenfest, the largest music festival in Hesse and one of the largest open-air events in Germany, has taken place every year on the last weekend of May around the Residential Palace Darmstadt and Friedens- und Karolinenplatz in Darmstadt. The musical spectrum ranges from rock, pop, electro, reggae and hip-hop to soul and jazz.

== Royal Ghost Story ==
According to several witnesses, including Frederica of Mecklenburg-Strelitz, Duchess of Cumberland and later Queen of Hanover, the ghost of the old Duchess of Darmstadt was seen in one of the rooms of the palace.

== See also ==
- List of castles in Hesse
