= Orangerie (Darmstadt) =

German castle

Orangerie Darmstadt
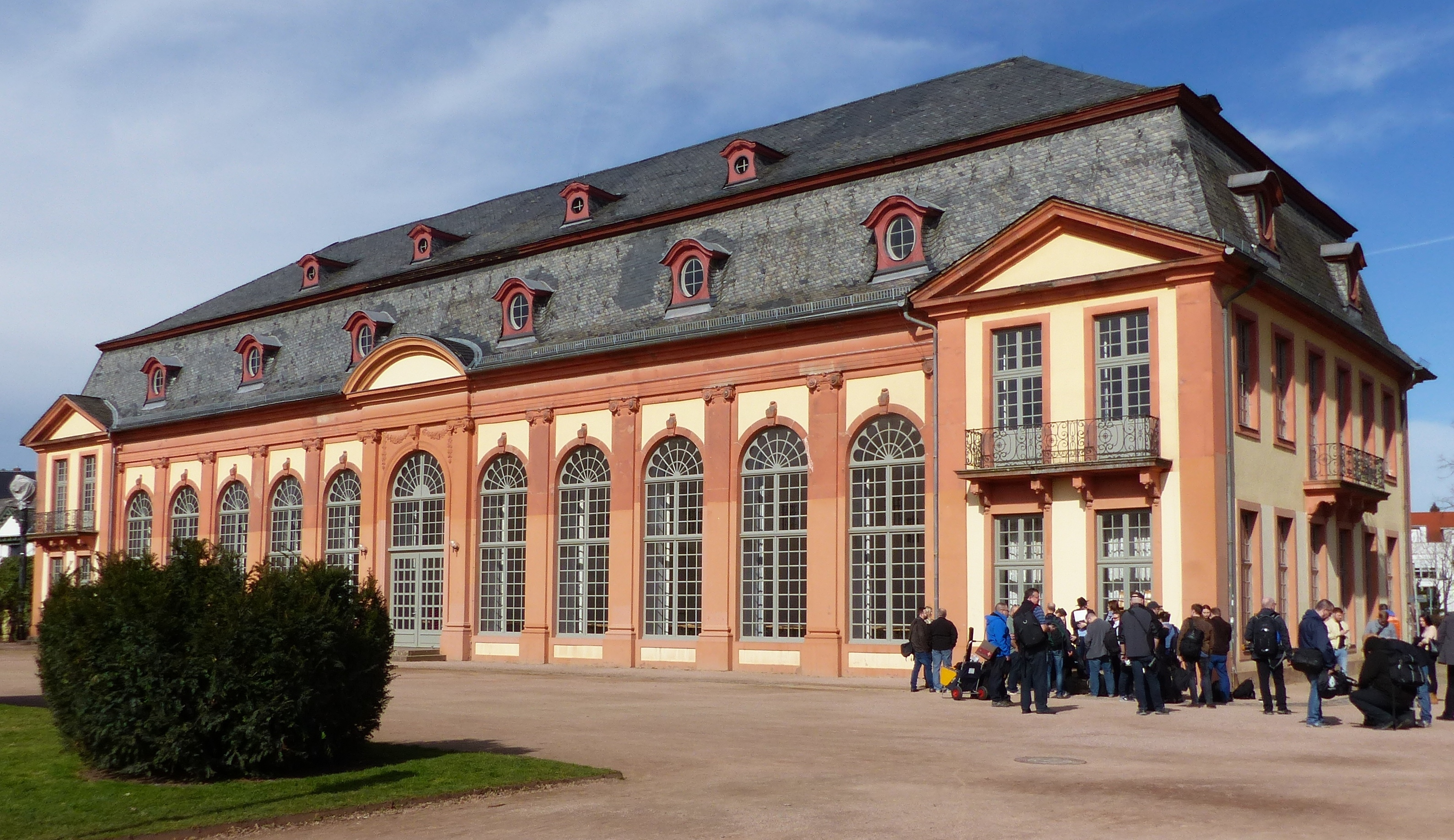
- The Orangery in the Bessungen district of Darmstadt (2017)
- Interactive map of the Orangerie Darmstadt area

General information
- Type: Baroque palace, Orangery
- Architectural style: Baroque
- Location: Darmstadt, Germany
- Coordinates: 49.8581°N 8.6530°E
- Current tenants: Concerts, conferences, restaurant
- Completed: c. 1720
- Renovated: 1782
- Owner: City of Darmstadt (leased)

Technical details
- Material: Sandstone, other materials

Design and construction
- Architect: Louis Remy de la Fosse

The Orangerie in Darmstadt, Germany, built around 1720, is a baroque palace building designed by the architect Louis Remy de la Fosse. Originally, it served as a winter shelter for citrus plants sensitive to the cold, which adorned the surrounding parkland in the summer months. The building was constructed with a one-storey hall open to the south, surrounded by single-storey rooms. The adjoining orangery park was designed under Ernest Louis, Landgrave of Hesse-Darmstadt by the Electoral Palatine court gardener Johann Kaspar Ehret from Heidelberg. The symmetrical Baroque grounds consist of three tiered garden parterres, wide axes with fountains and surrounding avenues. The sandstone gate of the former market palace forms the northern end.

== History ==
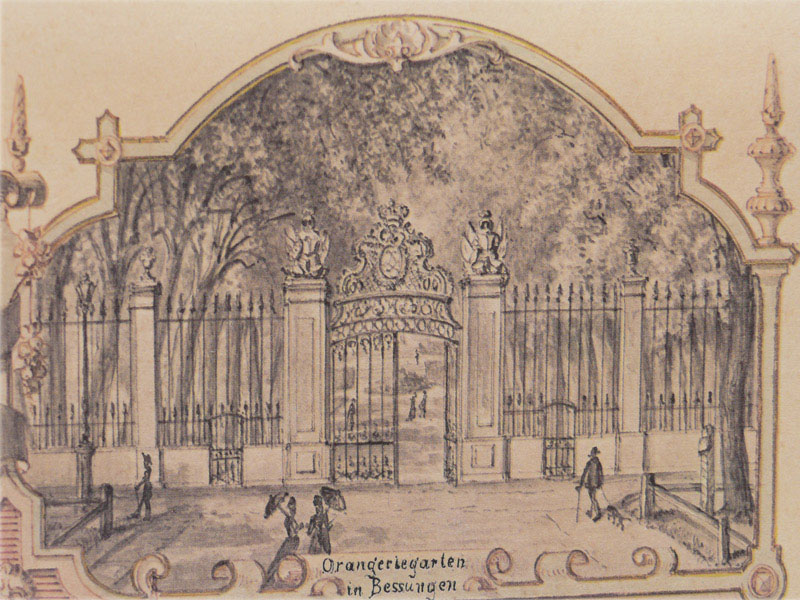
Orangeriegarten (c. 1884)

After a fire in 1774, the orangery was rebuilt in 1782 by the master builder Johann Martin Schuhknecht from Bessung. The emphasis was on restoring the building as faithfully as possible to the original, but the roof was raised by 1.5 m, making the building a good deal more massive than de la Fosse had planned.

The public only gained access to the park around 1802. In the following years, public events were increasingly held in the Orangery Garden. Prior to this, the grounds and the Orangery had been used exclusively by courtly society for festivities and gatherings. Public use was maintained when the garden, together with the Orangery, was leased to the city of Darmstadt for 99 years in 1925. After the Second World War, the Orangerie served temporarily as an alternative accommodation for the Staatstheater Darmstadt after the destruction of the municipal theatre building. The files of the conversion work carried out by the city for this use until 1972 are in the Darmstadt City Archives. However, the extensions were removed again after the State Theatre moved out in 1972 to restore the original condition.

Located in the Bessungen district of Darmstadt, the Orangerie building is now used for concerts and conferences. An adjoining building houses a restaurant.

== Events ==
On the 3rd weekend of September, the Bessunger Kerb takes place in the Orangeriepark with the Bessunger Merck Run of the TGB 1865 Darmstadt.

== Pictures from Orangeriepark ==
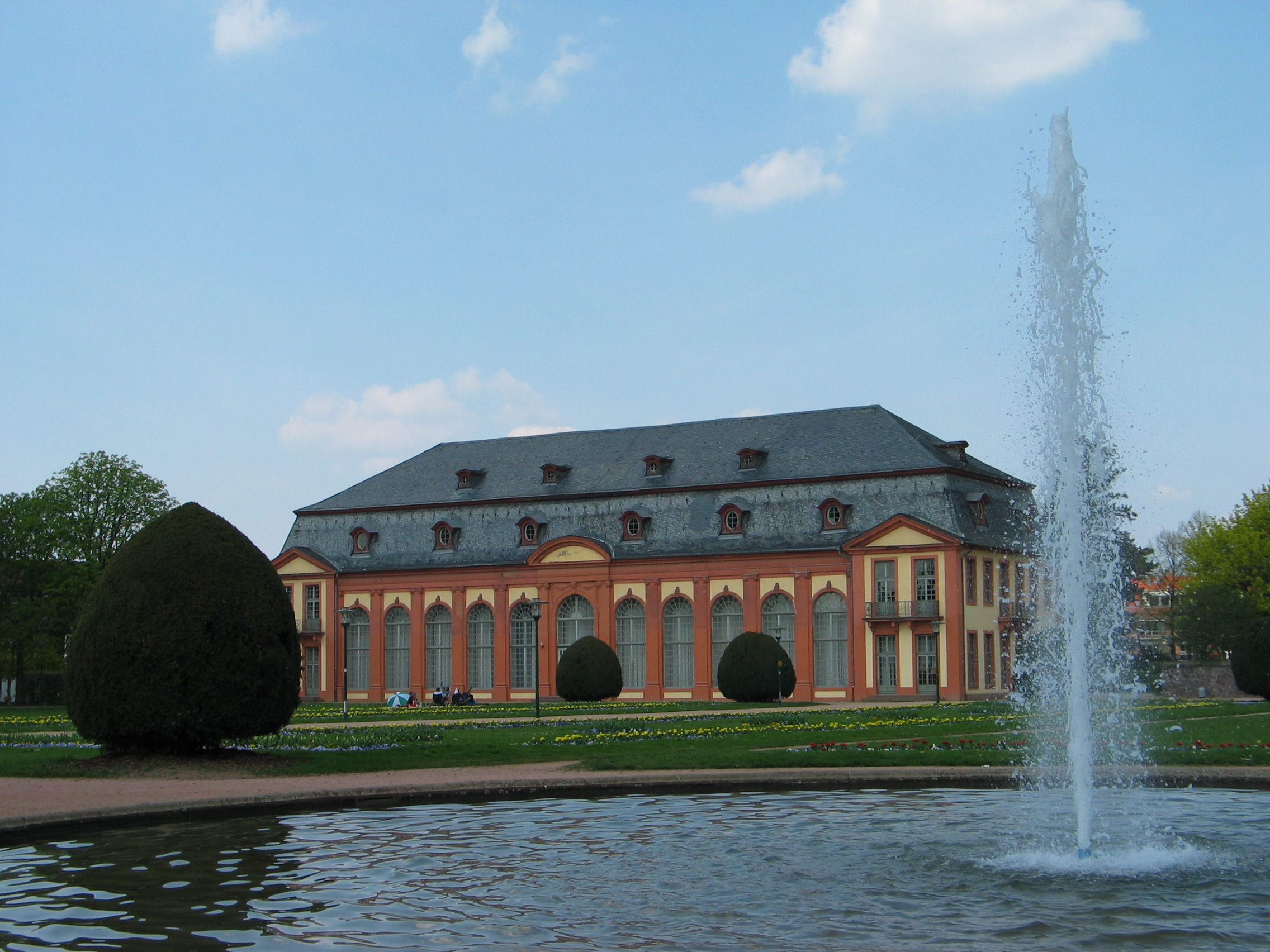
Orangerie (2004)

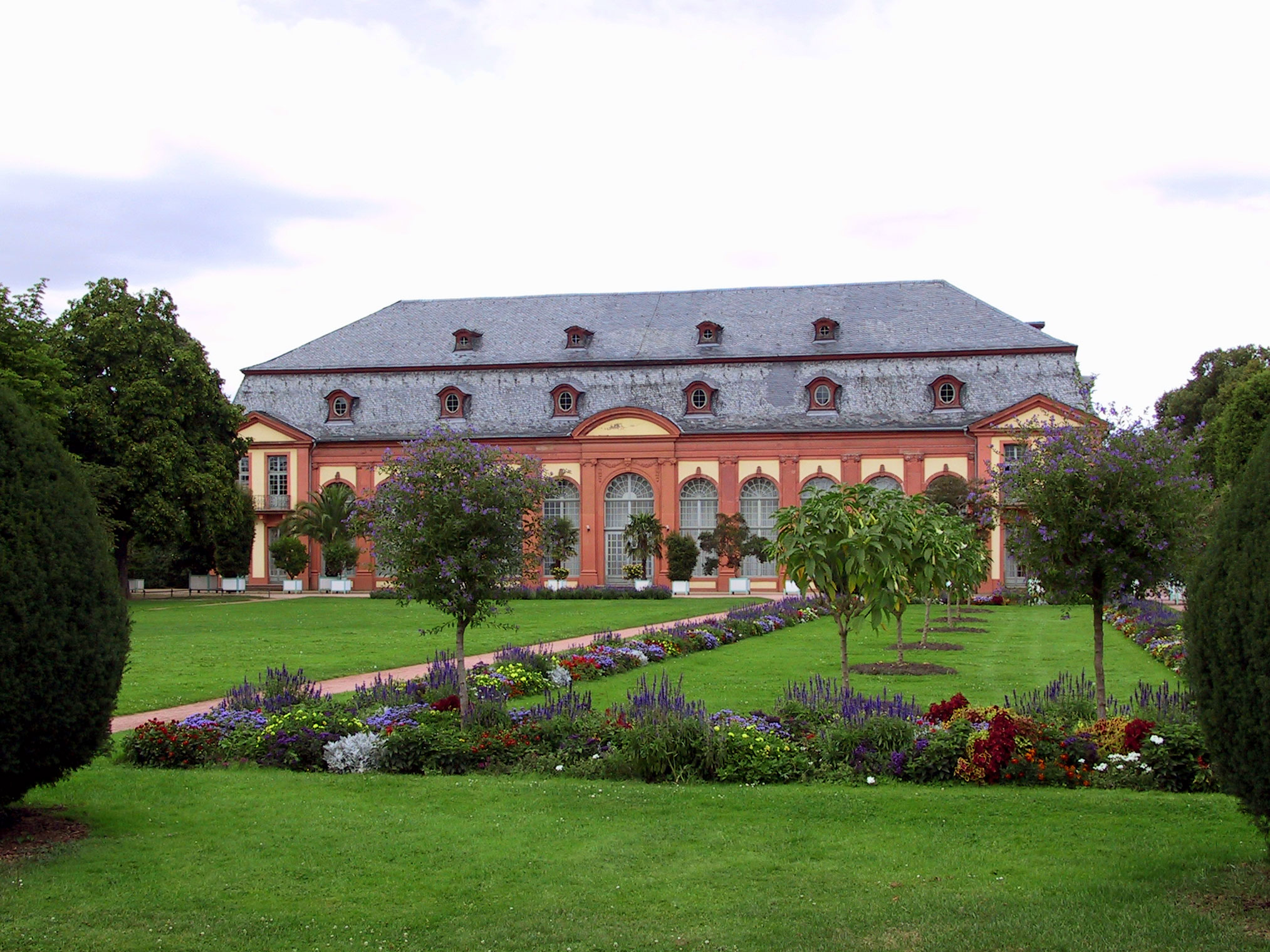
Orangerie (2005)

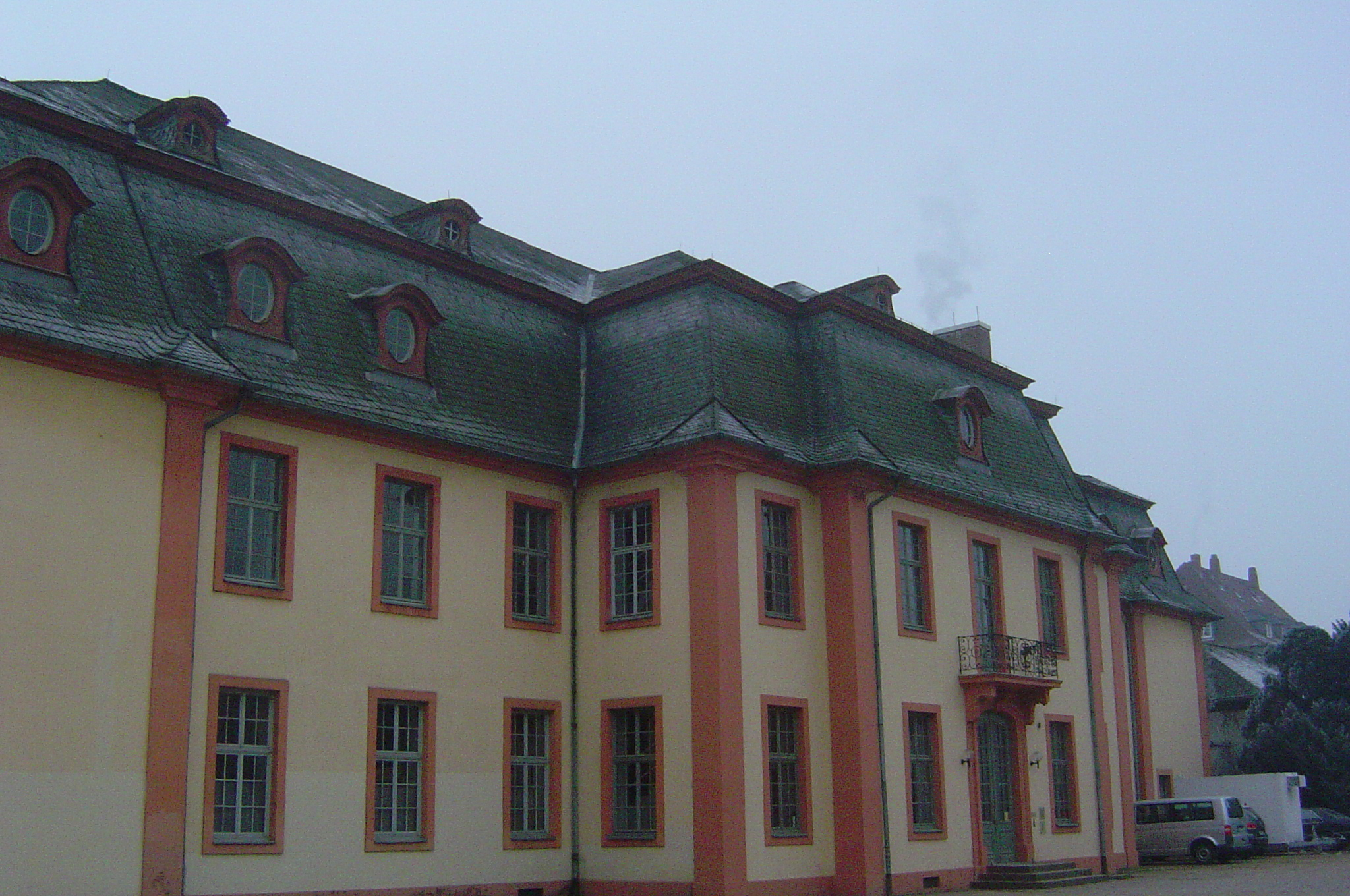
Orangerie (2008)

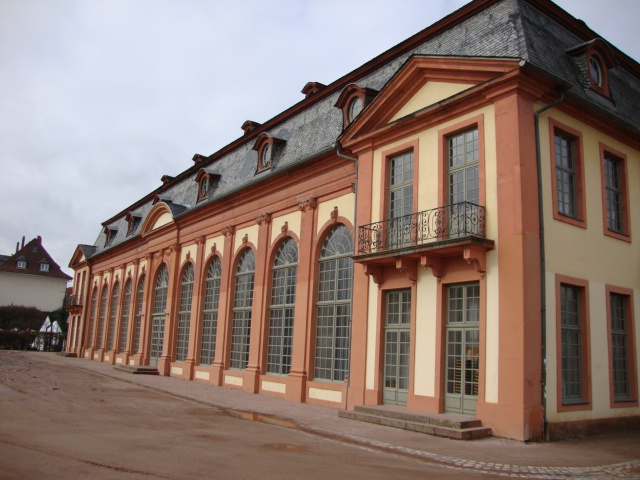
Orangerie (2009)

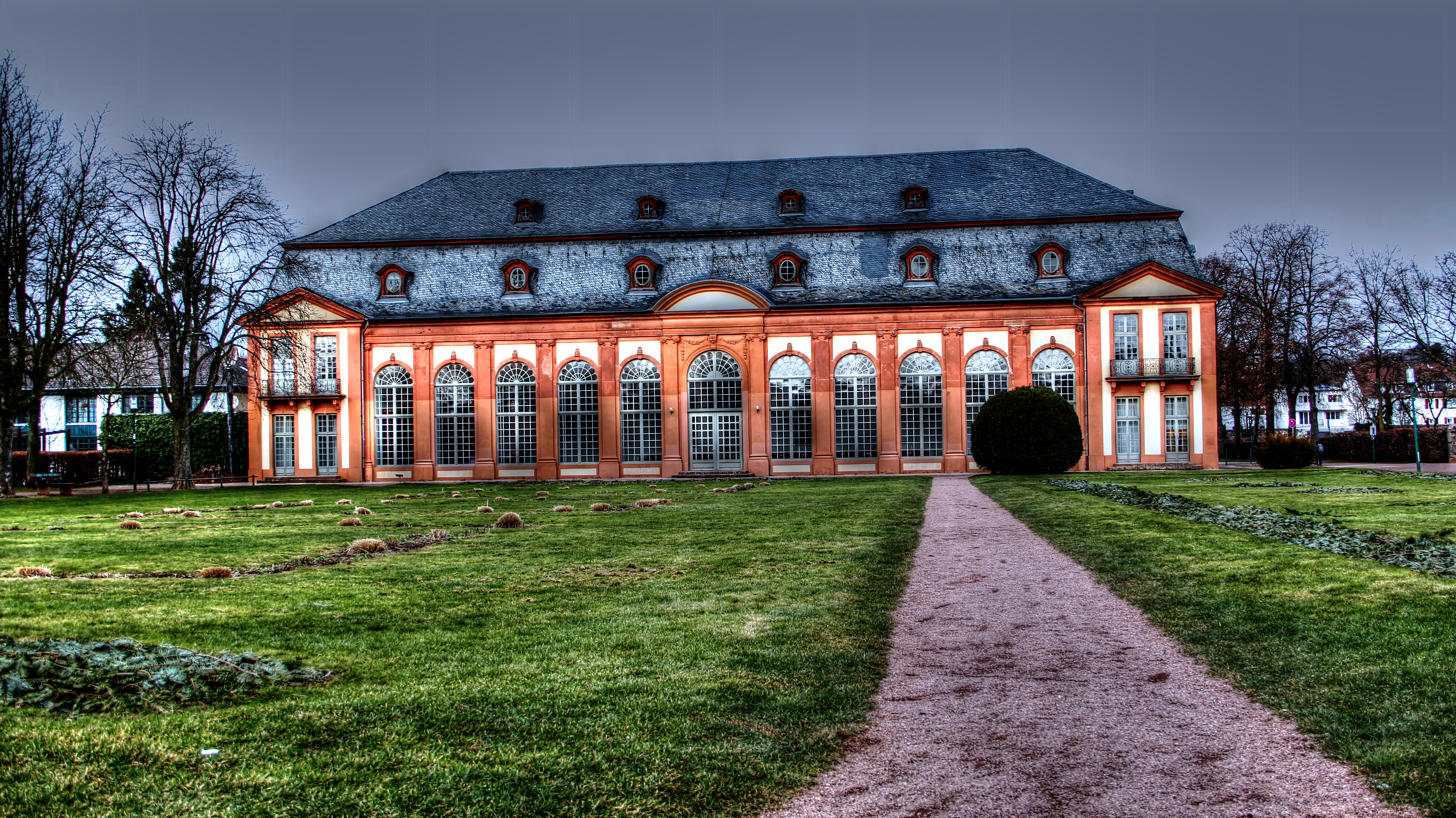
Orangerie (2013)

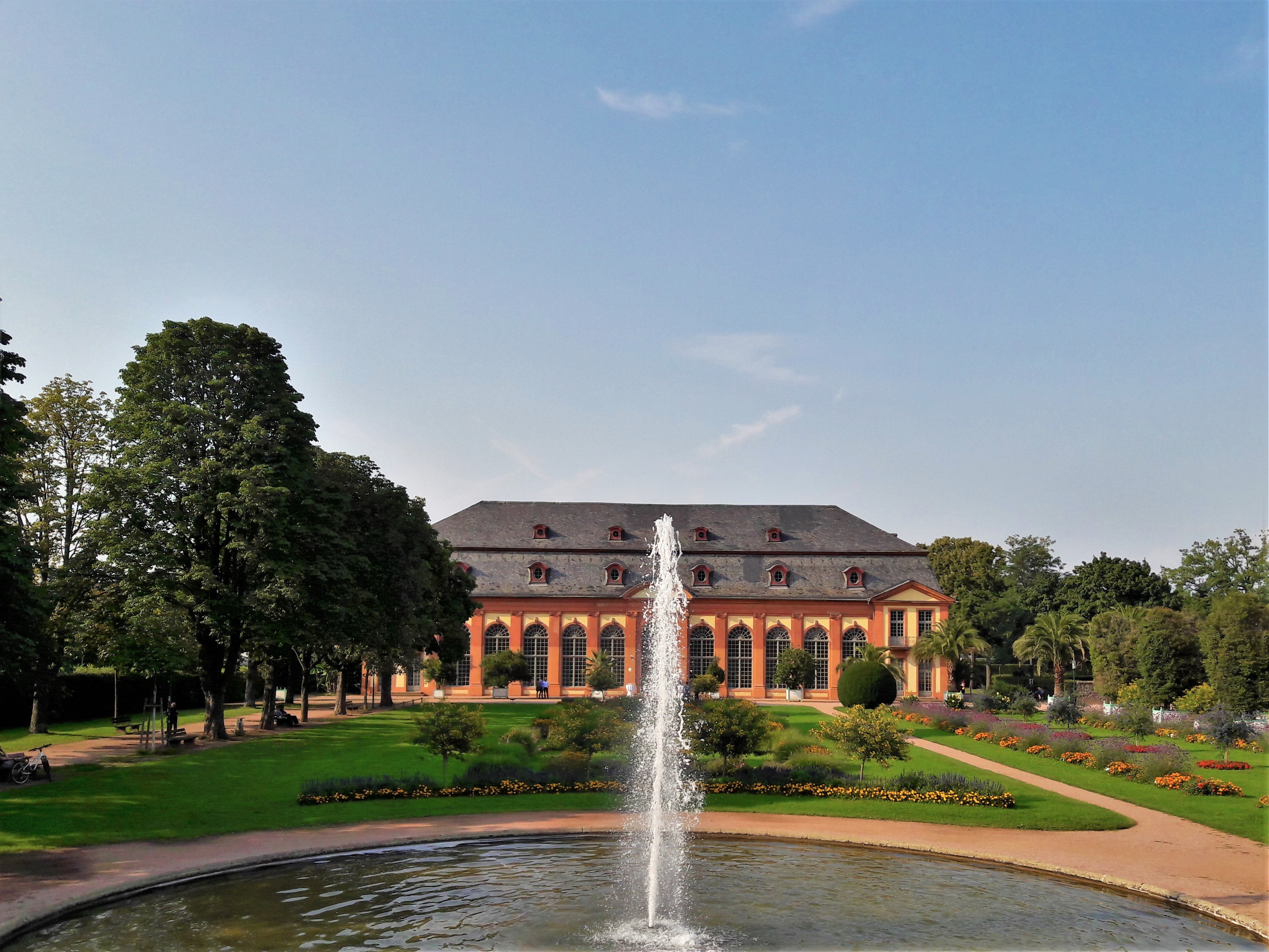
Orangerie (2017)
