= Stadtkirche Darmstadt =

Coordinates: 49°52′17″N 8°39′22″E

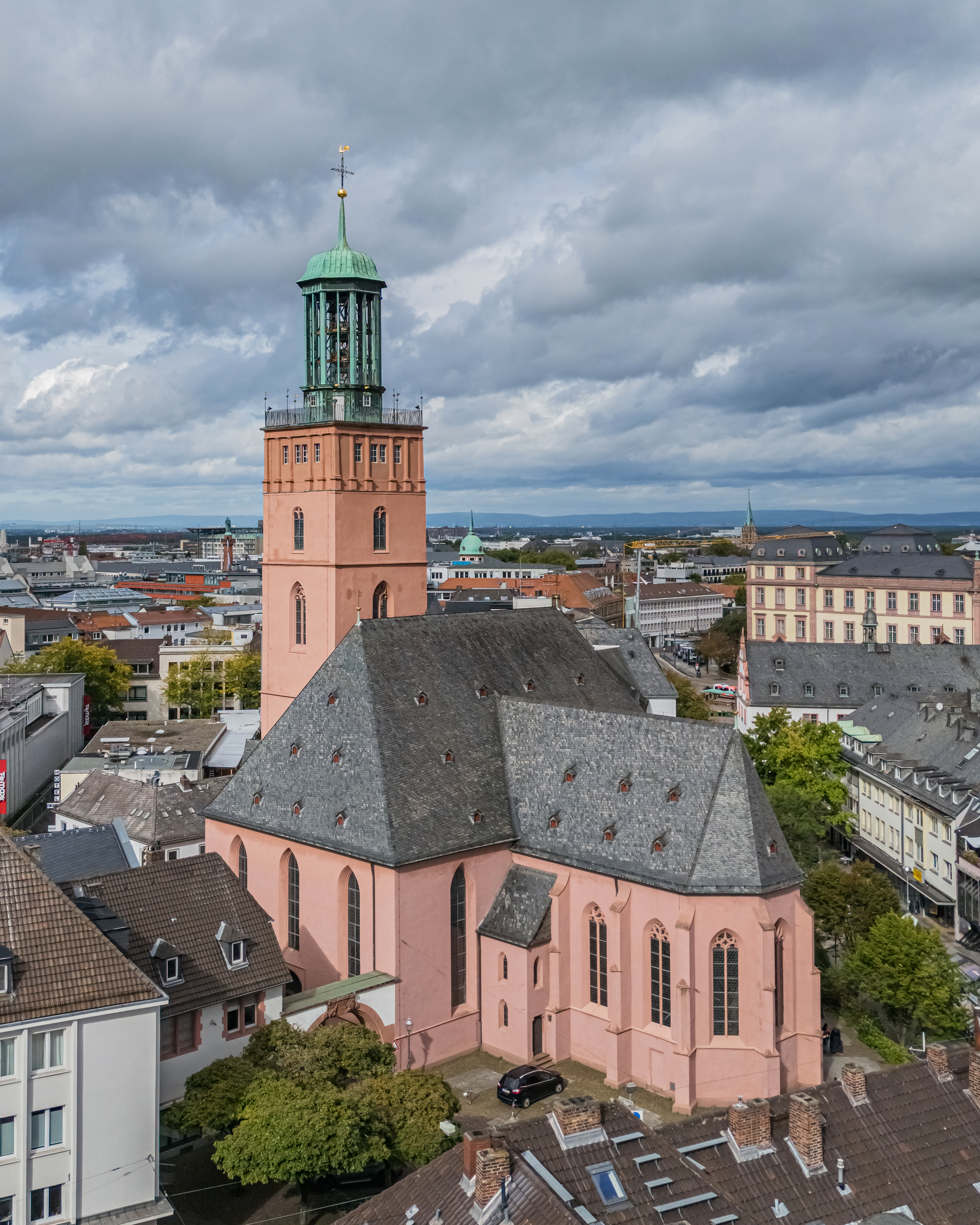
Aerial view of the Stadtkirche

The Stadtkirche Darmstadt (German: Stadtkirche Darmstadt) is the main Protestant church of the city of Darmstadt and one of its parish churches, but no longer the bishopric seat of the local Evangelische Kirche in Hessen und Nassau, which is the Pauluskirche in Darmstadt.

It is the oldest church in the original city. Originally dedicated to the Virgin Mary, the actual view is the one after reconstruction following WW II.

== Location ==
The church is located about 200 m (660 ft) south of the Residential Palace Darmstadt. The Fürstengruft in the crypt contains the graves of the reigning family of Hessen-Darmstadt. Additional graves can be seen inside the church. A graveyard around the church however is no longer existent.

The tower is 63 m (207 ft) high and one of the tallest buildings in Darmstadt.

== Tales ==
Originally a tunnel may have connected the crypt and the palace. However, only a small tunnel actually remains.

== History ==
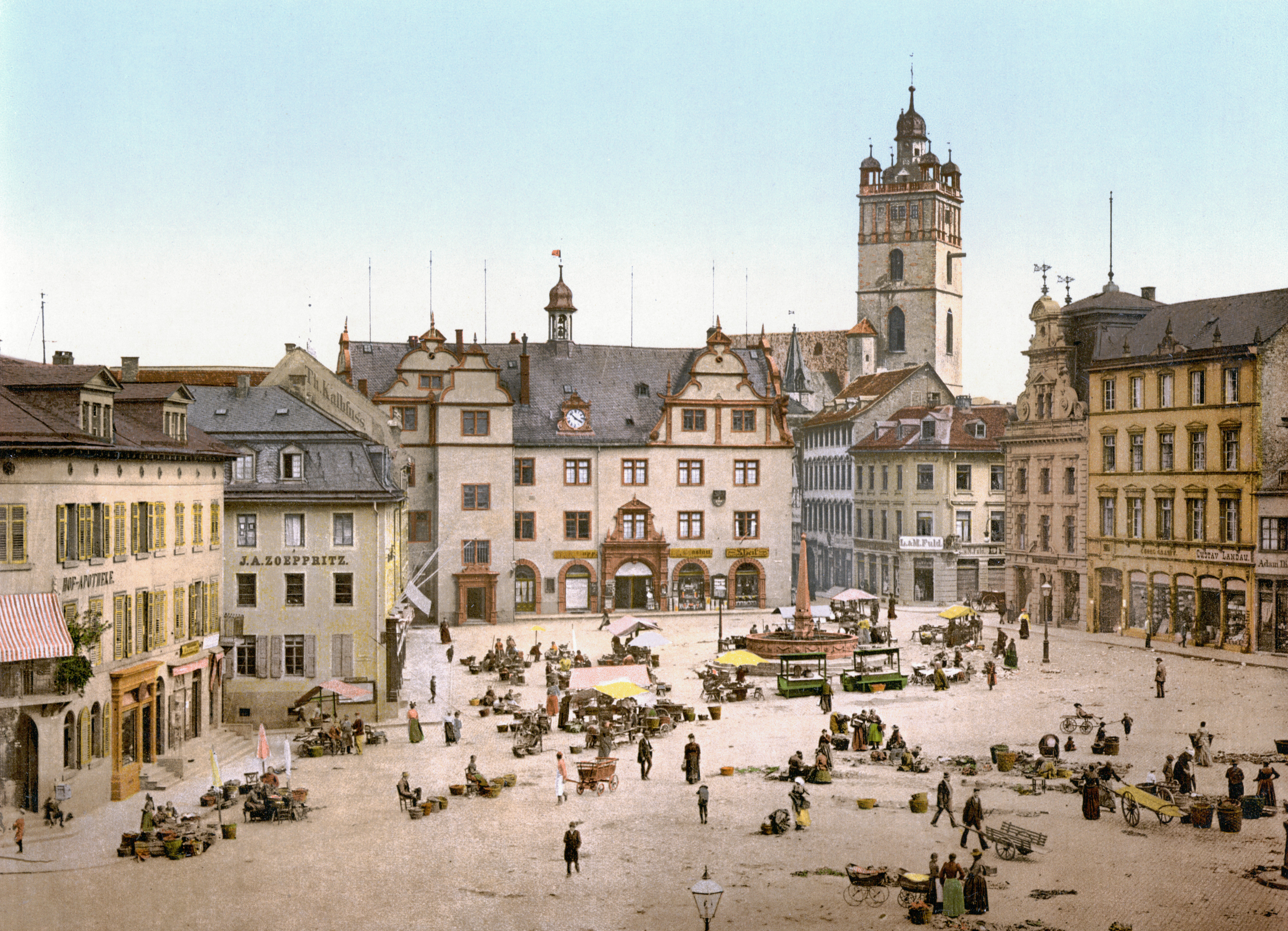
Marktplatz with the previous church tower look

The church was first mentioned in the 12th century. However all parts remaining date from the 17th century or later. Until 1929 it contained a princely seat dated 1844 which was removed that year. Air raids in 1943 and 1944 damaged the church considerably. It was reconstructed 1946–1952.

== Monuments ==
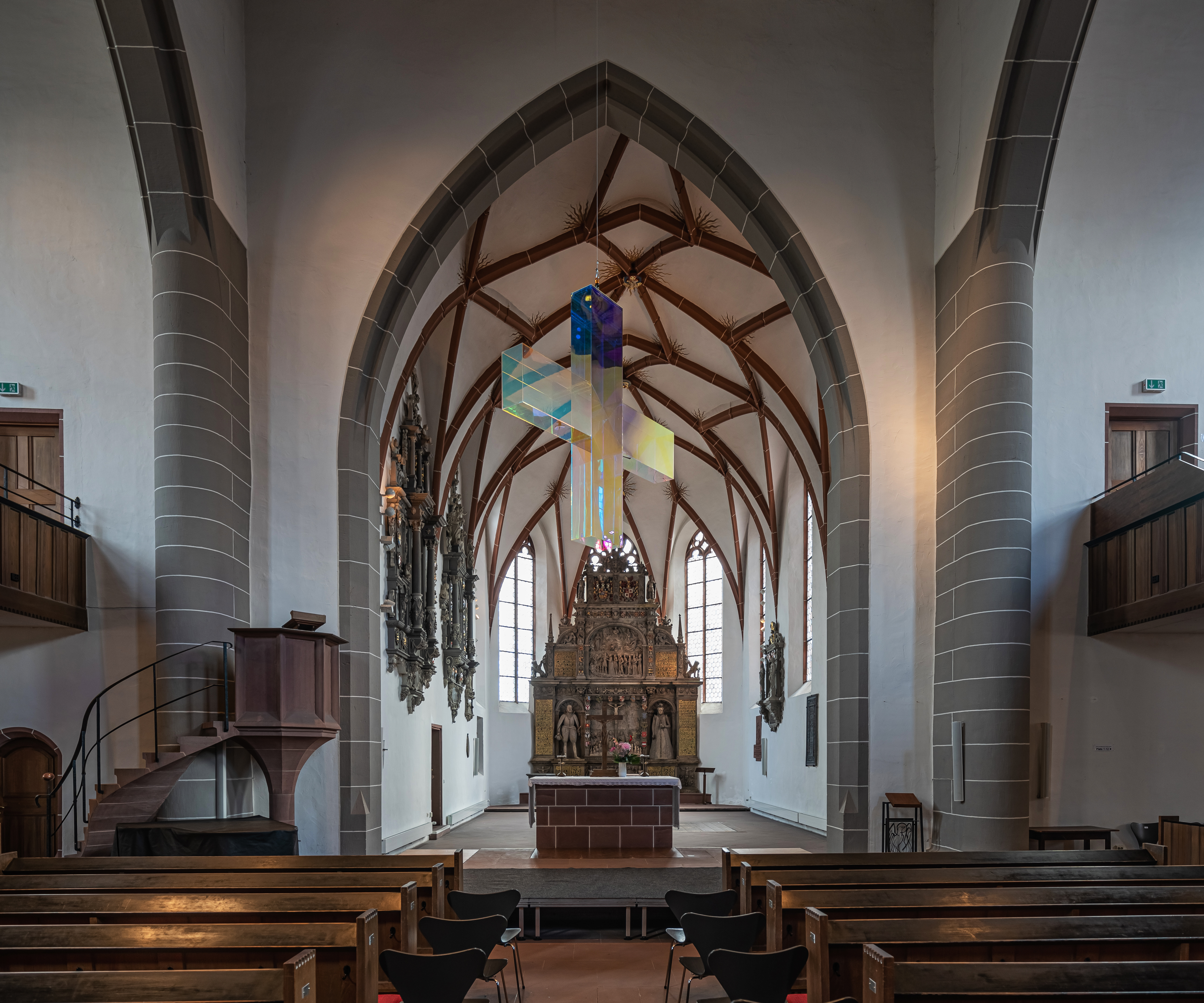
Interior of the church

The church contains various monuments to the ruling family of Hesse-Darmstadt, dating from 1576 to 1972. These include:

- Landgrave George I und his wife Magdalena of Lippe - erected 1588-89
- Prince Philipp Wilhelm – 1576
- Princess Maria of Braunschweig
- Landgravine Eleonore of Hesse-Darmstadt
- Prince George William of Hesse-Darmstadt
- Louise of Mecklenburg-Strelitz – 1931
- Louis, Prince of Hesse and by Rhine – 1972. He was the last male member of the family

== Literature ==
- Knodt, Manfred; Gramer, Kurt (1980). Evangelische Stadtkirche in Darmstadt (in German). München: Schnell and Steiner. ISBN 3-7954-0814-8. OCLC 16826047.
- Knodt, Manfred (1993). Rundblick vom Stadtkirchturm : Erinnerungen an Darmstadts Weg aus den Trümmern (in German). Darmstadt: H.L. Schlapp. ISBN 3-87704-030-6. OCLC 32777618.

== Jazz ==
The "Live! Jazz in der Stadtkirche!" series began with the "Round Midnight" series in the summer of 2005, followed by regular spring and autumn jazz concerts and festivals in the church. The church sees jazz performances as part of its old function as a cultural mediator. Jazz opens the church to an audience beyond the parish. In the summer of 2013 the "Round Midnight – Jazz und Gedanken für Nachschwärmer" series in the church included pianist Rainer Böhm and guitarist Norbert Scholly. In spring of 2014 the "Live! Jazz in der Stadtkirche!" series included the "Live! Ladies of Jazz" program in January–February with performers such as pianist Anke Helfrich. Between September and December 2014 performers in this series included the drummer Billy Hart, pianist Michael Wollny and accordionist Vincent Peirani.

== Sources ==
- "Darmstädter Stadtkirche wird zum Jazz-Club", EKHN (in German), 8 September 2014
- "Evangelisches Dekanat Darmstadt-Stadt", Newsletter (in German), Stadtkirche Darmstadt, 19 June 2013
- ""Ladies of Jazz" in der Stadtkirche Darmstadt", KIRCHENGUCKEN (in German), 6 January 2014
- Live!Jazz (in German), Stadtkirche Darmstadt
