= Louis Remy de la Fosse =

French Baroque architect

Louis Remy de la Fosse (French: [lwi ʁemi də la fɔs]; c. 1659 – 1726) was a French architect of the Baroque period who worked primarily in Germany.

== Career ==
Until 1705, Fosse served as a draftsman in the studio of master builder Johann Friedrich Eosander in Berlin. From 1706 to 1709, he worked as an architect at the Hanover court of Elector George Louis and later designed castles in Schlitz and Kassel. From 1711 to 1714, he held the position of court architect in Hanover before becoming senior engineer in the service of Ernest Louis, Landgrave of Hesse-Darmstadt.

In 1717, he built the Orangerie in Darmstadt. Fosse was also commissioned to completely redesign the Residential Palace Darmstadt. However, due to financial constraints, only the main facade and one wing of the complex were realized.

Between 1723 and 1750, Schloss Hohenlohe-Schillingsfürst in Schillingsfürst, Bavaria, was constructed for the Princes of Hohenlohe-Schillingsfürst based on Fosse's plans. The residence is considered one of the most significant Baroque palace complexes in southern Germany.

== Works ==
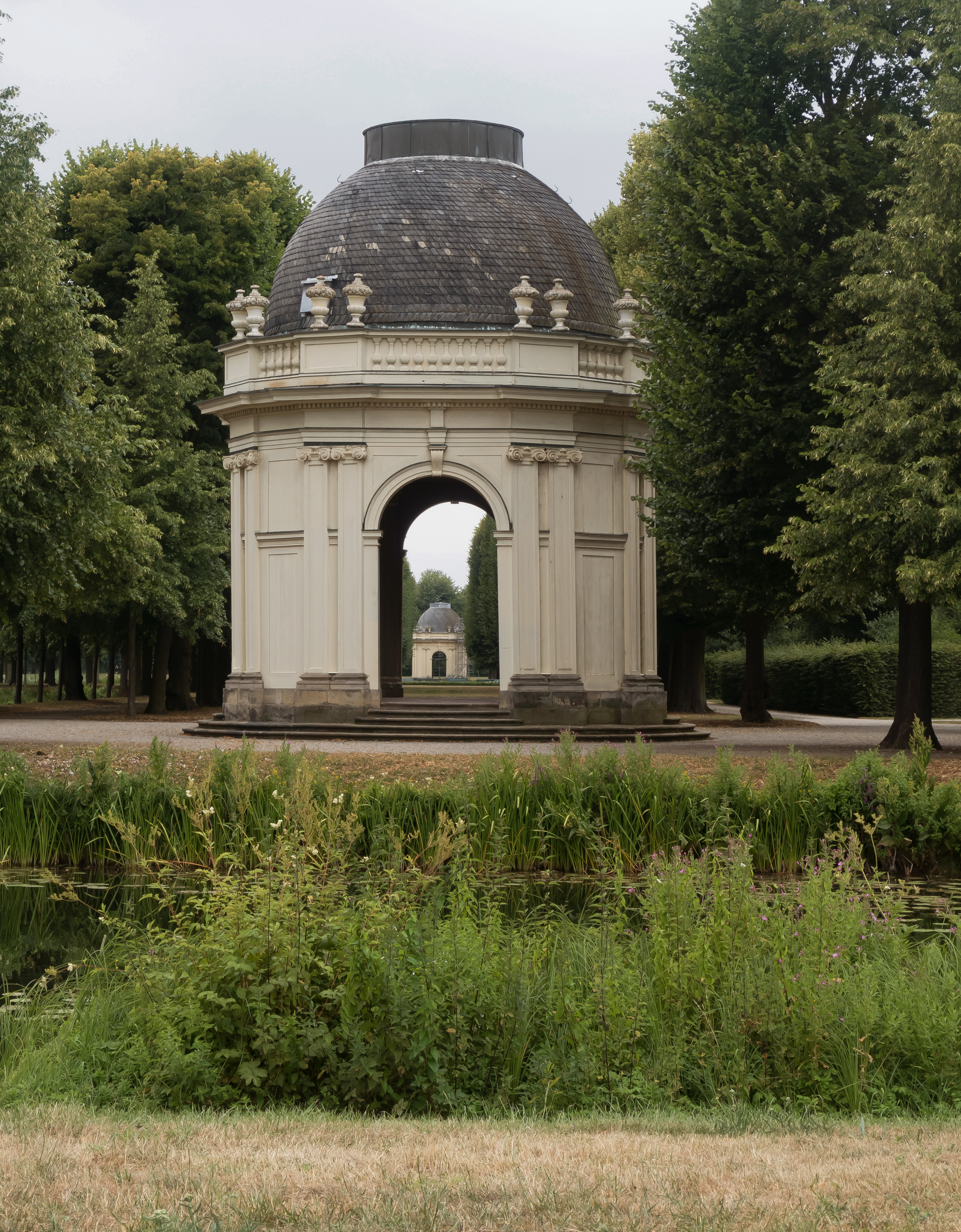
Corner pavilion at the Graft in Hanover

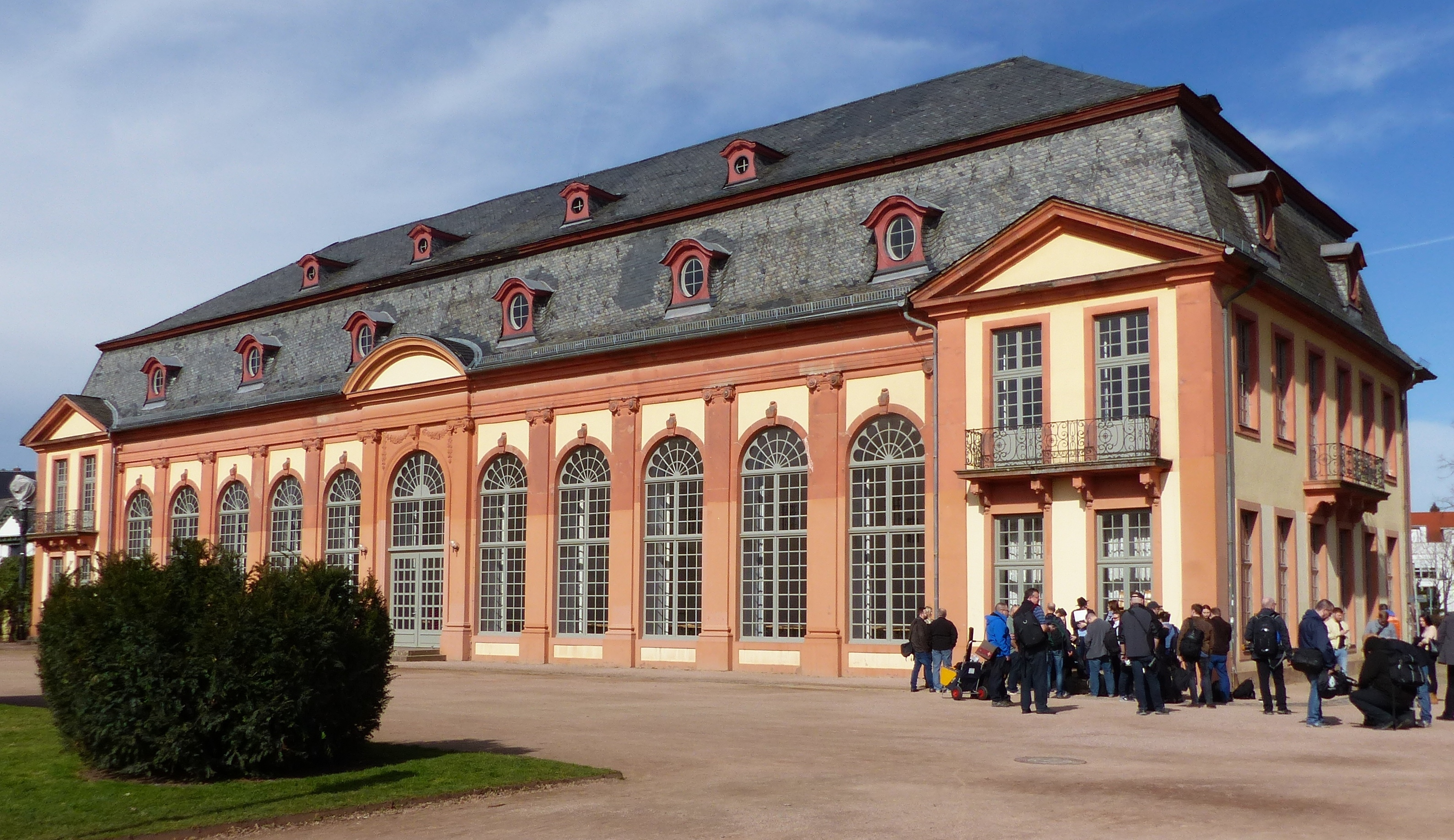
Orangerie in Darmstadt

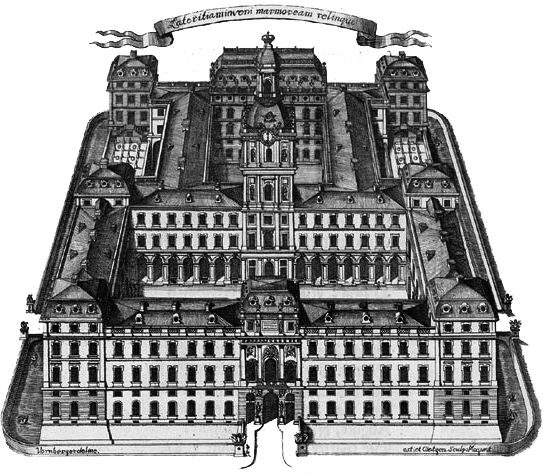
Copperplate engraving of the planned Residential Palace Darmstadt

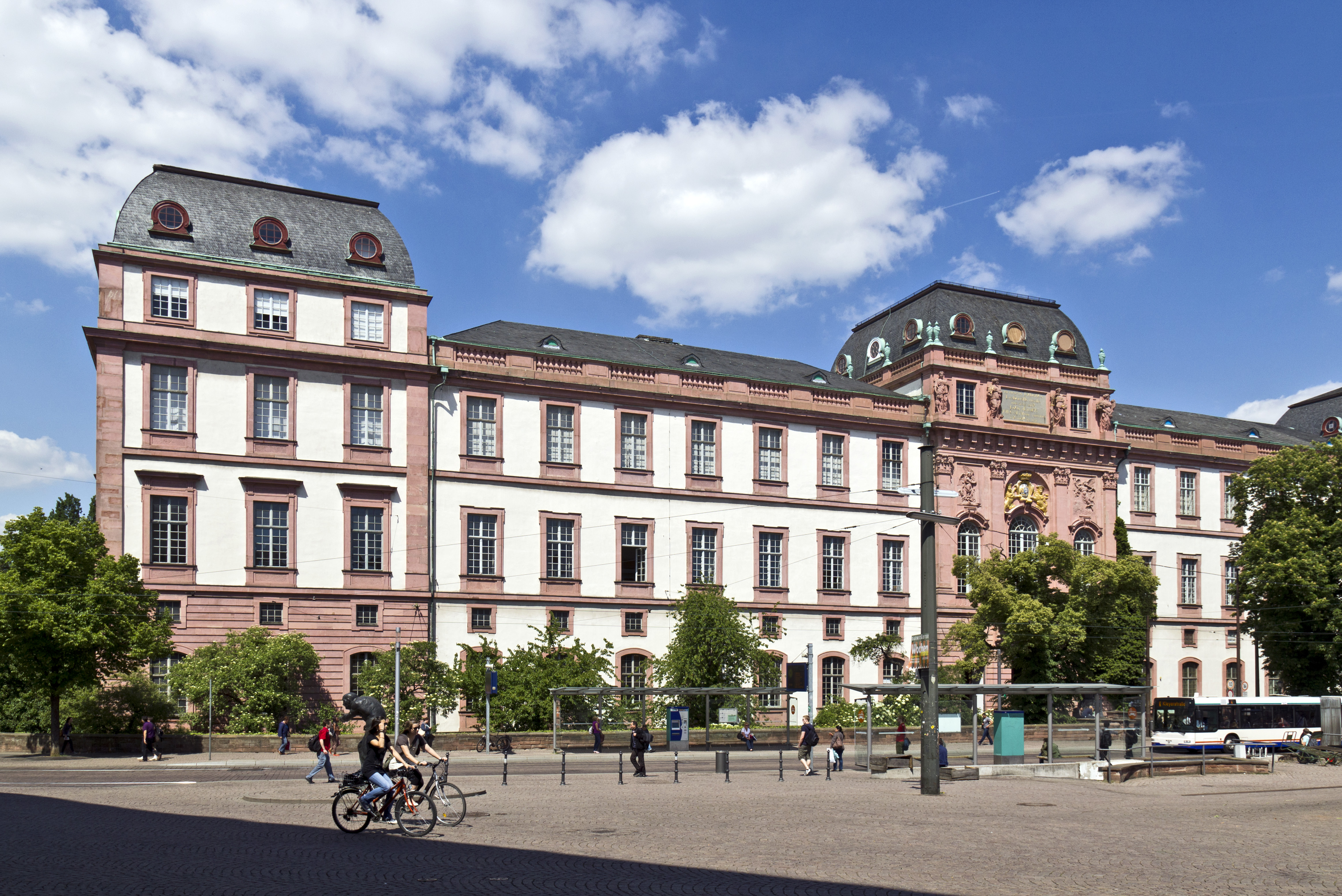
Residential Palace Darmstadt

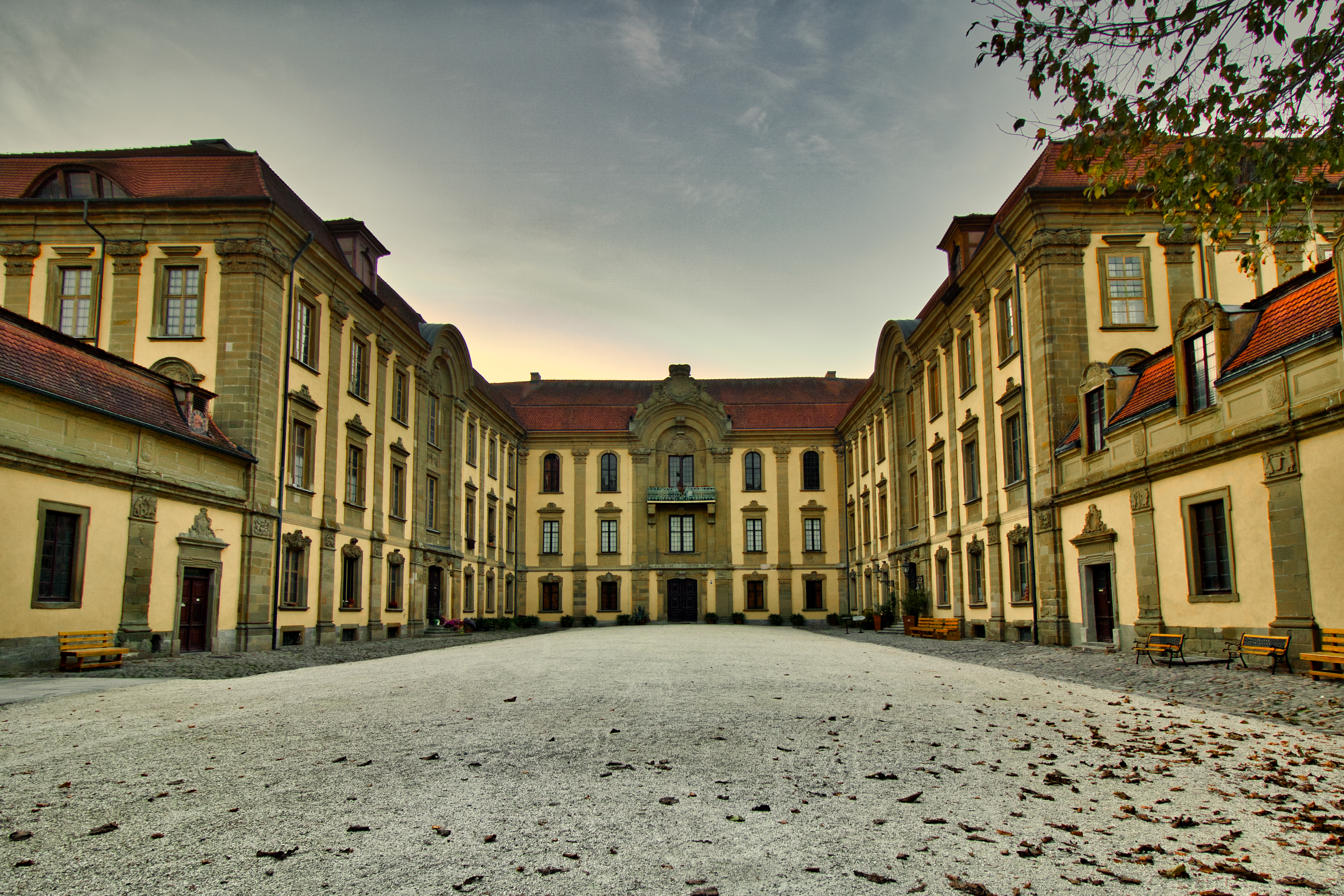
Courtyard of Schloss Hohenlohe-Schillingsfürst
