= Heinerfest =

Annual German festival

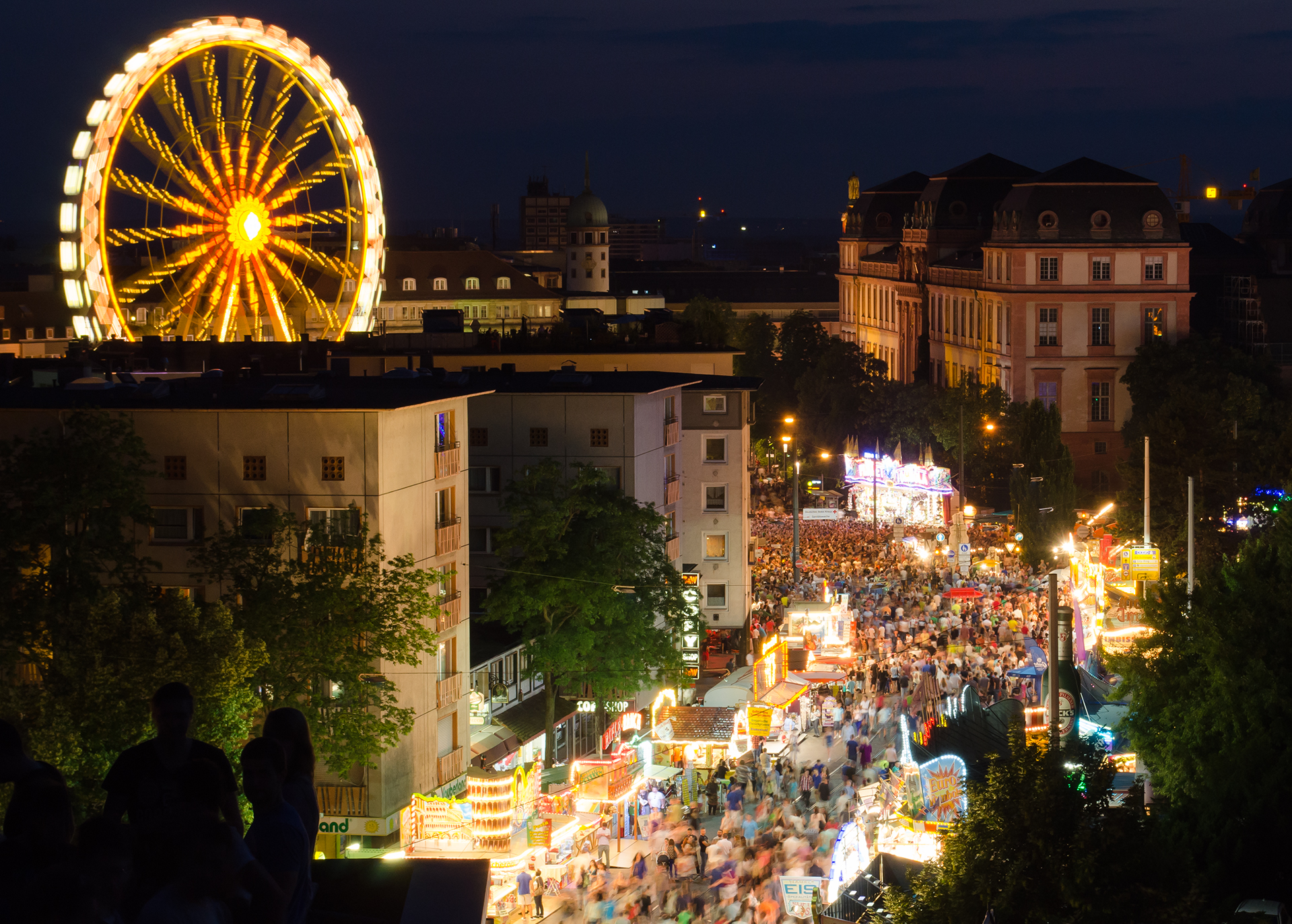
Heinerfest

Heinerfest is an annual festival in Darmstadt, Germany, held annually in the first weekend of July. During the festival food and beer vendors along with amusement rides and games surround the old city center and occupy surrounding streets. It offers a range of rides for childrens and adults. The first Heinerfest occurred in 1951 and has been growing since every year.

There are food and beverage vendors, as well as amusement rides such as roller coasters and ferris wheels.

== Rides ==
The Heinerfest in 2017 presents a variety of rides including:

- An 85-meter free fall tower.
- A carousel, big and small.
- Apollo 13, a ride based on the Apollo 13 space mission.

== Children ==
The Heinerfest is a child-friendly event, offering rides accessible by younger festivalgoers.
