= Bundesautobahn 7 =

Federal highway in Germany

A 7
- Bundesautobahn 7
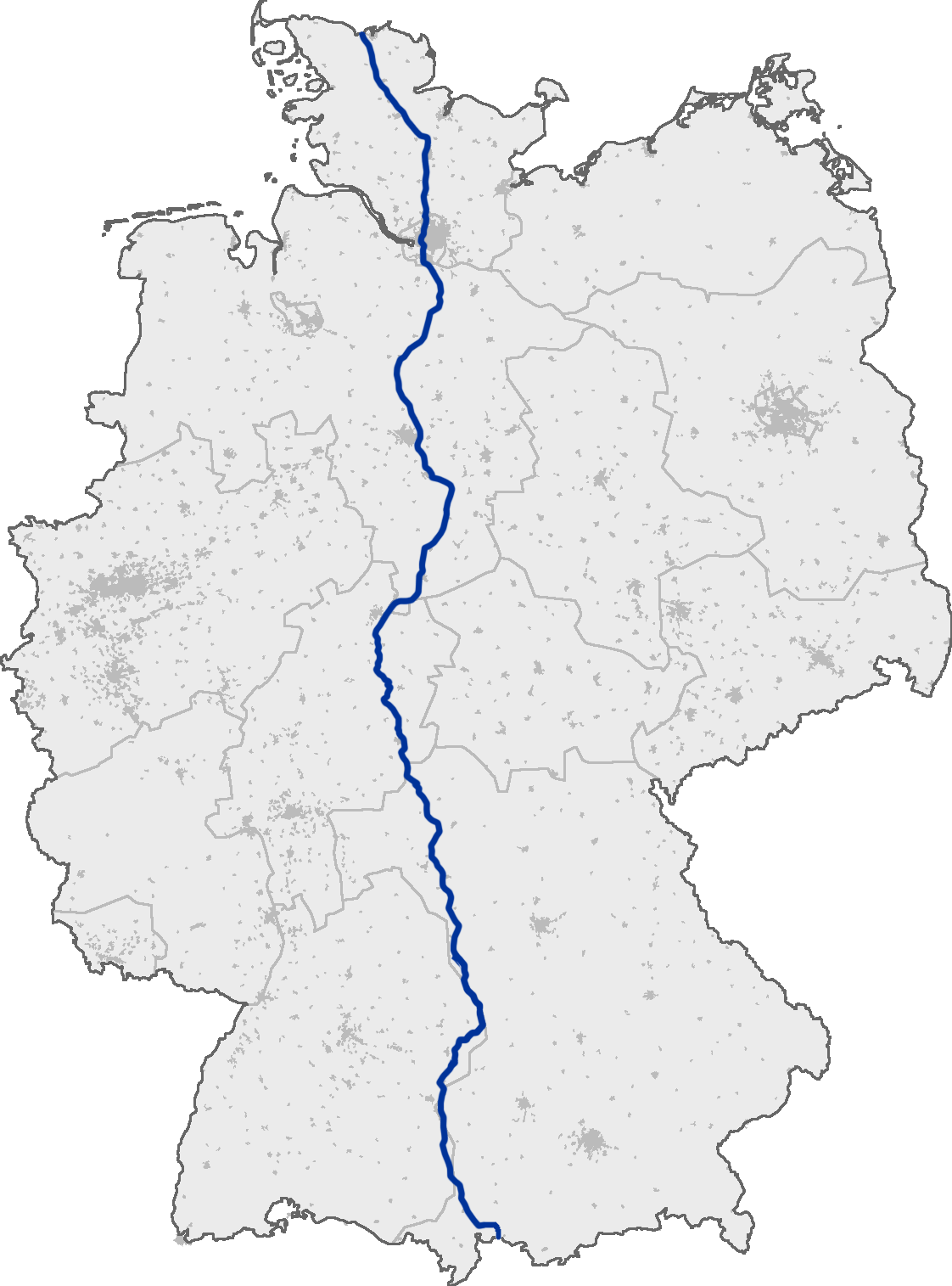

Route information
- Part of E45 / E43 / E40
- Length: 963 km (598 mi)

Major junctions
- North end: Danish border near Harrislee, Schleswig-Holstein
- South end: Austrian border in Fussen, Bavaria

Location
- Country: Germany
- States: Schleswig-Holstein, Hamburg, Lower Saxony, Hesse, Bavaria, Baden-Württemberg

Highway system
- Roads in Germany; Autobahns; List; Federal; List; State; E-roads
← A 6	→ A 8

Bundesautobahn 7 (translates from German as Federal Motorway 7, short form Autobahn 7, abbreviated as BAB 7 or A 7) is the longest German Autobahn and the longest national motorway in Europe at 963 km (598 mi). It bisects the country almost evenly between east and west. In the north, it starts at the border with Denmark as an extension of the Danish part of E45. In the south, the autobahn ends at the Austrian border. This final gap was closed in September 2009.

== Overview ==
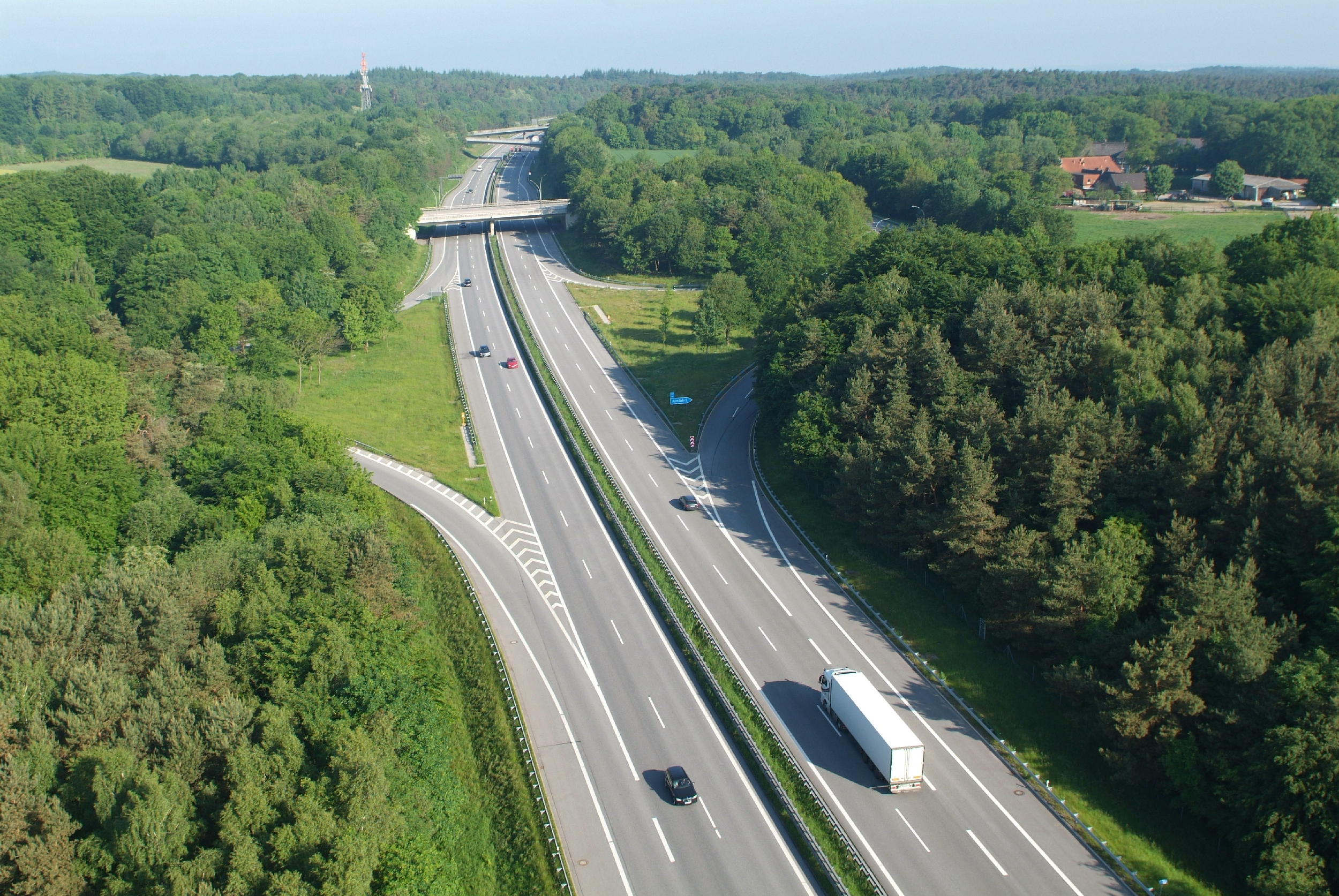
BAB 7 approaching Hamburg

The Bundesautobahn 7 starts at Flensburg and travels through the two states at Schleswig and Rendsburg, through the world's busiest artificial waterway of Kiel Canal crossing the Rader high bridge. At Rendsburg you can change to the A 210, a feeder to the Schleswig-Holstein capital, Kiel. A few kilometers further south there is another feeder route to Kiel, the A 215, into the A7 at the interchange Bordesholm; however, this can only be reached from the south, likewise from the A 215 you can only reach the A7 in the south. South of Bordesholm, the highway has been continuously expanded to six lanes since 2014 due to the high traffic volume to Hamburg. Since 2016 and 2017, several sections have six lanes. Here, the motorway leads past the cities of Neumünster, Bad Bramstedt and Norderstedt, before the hamlet of Schnelsen reaches Hamburg's urban area, and also Hamburg Airport. From the intersection Hamburg-Nordwest, where the A23 branches off towards Heide, the A7 is six lanes, but is currently being expanded to eight lanes.

The section through the city of Hamburg is characterized by an immense volume of traffic, congestion is the order of the day here. There are several reasons for this: the motorway runs through inner-city areas, there is a lot of holiday traffic on the route during school holidays, there are practically no opportunities for bypassing, the speed is permanently limited to 80 km/h (50 mph) as an urban area and the section is extended, South of the equipped with four tubes to two lanes Elbe tunnel leads the A7 on the highway Elbmarsch, the longest road bridge in Germany, right through the harbor area and the Harburg mountains to Lower Saxony. Via the corner junction A 261 you get to the A 1 to Bremen, at the following Maschener Kreuz on the A 39 to Lüneburg.

Going through Hanover from Hamburg, the highway has six lanes, and it was downgraded to the four-lane section between Soltau and Walsrode the hard shoulder can be temporarily released as a third lane. It leads across the Lüneburg Heath, partly with separate directional lanes. At the triangle Walsrode you reach the A 27 to Bremen and a few kilometers to the south, before reaching the capital of Lower Saxony, at the junction Hannover-Nord on the A 352, which connects to Hannover Airport and ends at the A 2, which leads to Dortmund. The following motorway junctions of the A7 provide a connection to the A37 Hanover city center and to Celle or A 2 Ruhrgebiet-Berlin dar. By the Altwarmbüchener Moor the highway leads east to Hanover; at the triangle Hannover-Süd, where the southern branch of the A 37 to the fair Hanover is connected only with the further south part of the A7.

South of Hildesheim, the A7 enters a low mountain range and the terrain becomes hilly. The Salzgitter triangle also connects only the southern part of the A7 with the A 39 to Braunschweig and Salzgitter. Between the triangle Salzgitter and Göttingen the highway is expands to six lanes. Passing the university town, the A 38 branches off at Dreieck Drammetal to Leipzig, then the A7 leads over steep gradients and slopes down into the Werratal near the town of Hann. Münden and continues onto Hesse.

At Kassel, it is the largest district, from there you can get on the A44 in the direction of the west to the Ruhr area and in some years, when the extension Kassel-Herleshausen will be completed, also in the direction of Eisenach. Between the interchange Kassel-Ost and the interchange Kassel-Süd, the A7 is being developed eight-lane for a future convergence with the then branching off to the east A44. In Kassel, the unfinished A 49 branches off, which will lead from completed completion to the Ohmtal triangle, which is to be built near Homberg (Ohm) between the junctions Alsfeld-West and Homberg (Ohm) on the A5. Between Kassel and Kirchheim the Knüllgebirge is crossed. The Kirchheim triangle and the Hattenbacher triangle, which are close to each other and quite close to the geographic center of Germany, together form one of the most important motorway junctions of the state. The A 4 leads to the New Länder and Eastern Europe, the A 5 to the Rhine-Main area and on to the border of Switzerland. South of the Hattenbacher triangle is the A7 sections four-lane expanded, leads past Fulda, where the A 66 branches off to Hanau and reaches Bavarian territory.

Crossing the Rhön Mountains, pass Schweinfurt (cross with the A 70 to Bayreuth) and Würzburg to the Biebelried intersection, where the A 3 Ruhrgebiet-Frankfurt am Main-Nürnberg-Passau is crossed. This was the southern end of the A7 for a long time. The completion of the south in the 1980s leads past Rothenburg ob der Tauber on the western edge of the Frankenhöhe to the freeway junction Feuchtwangen / Crailsheim (intersection with the A 6 Saarbrücken-Heilbronn-Nuremberg- Waidhaus) and partly Baden-Württemberg area over the Ostalb, for the crossing even two tunnels had to be built, via Aalen to Ulm. At the motorway junction Ulm / Elchingen, the A8 (Luxembourg-Karlsruhe-Stuttgart-Munich-Salzburg) is crossed. South of Ulm it goes through the Illertal parallel to the river back to Bavaria, via Memmingen (cross with the A 96 Lindau Munich) and Kempten (branch to the A 980 to Oberstdorf), over the 2009 completed section through the Reinertshoftunnel to the edge of the foot of the Alps. There, the lane becomes one lane and flows into the border tunnel Füssen to Austria.

== History ==
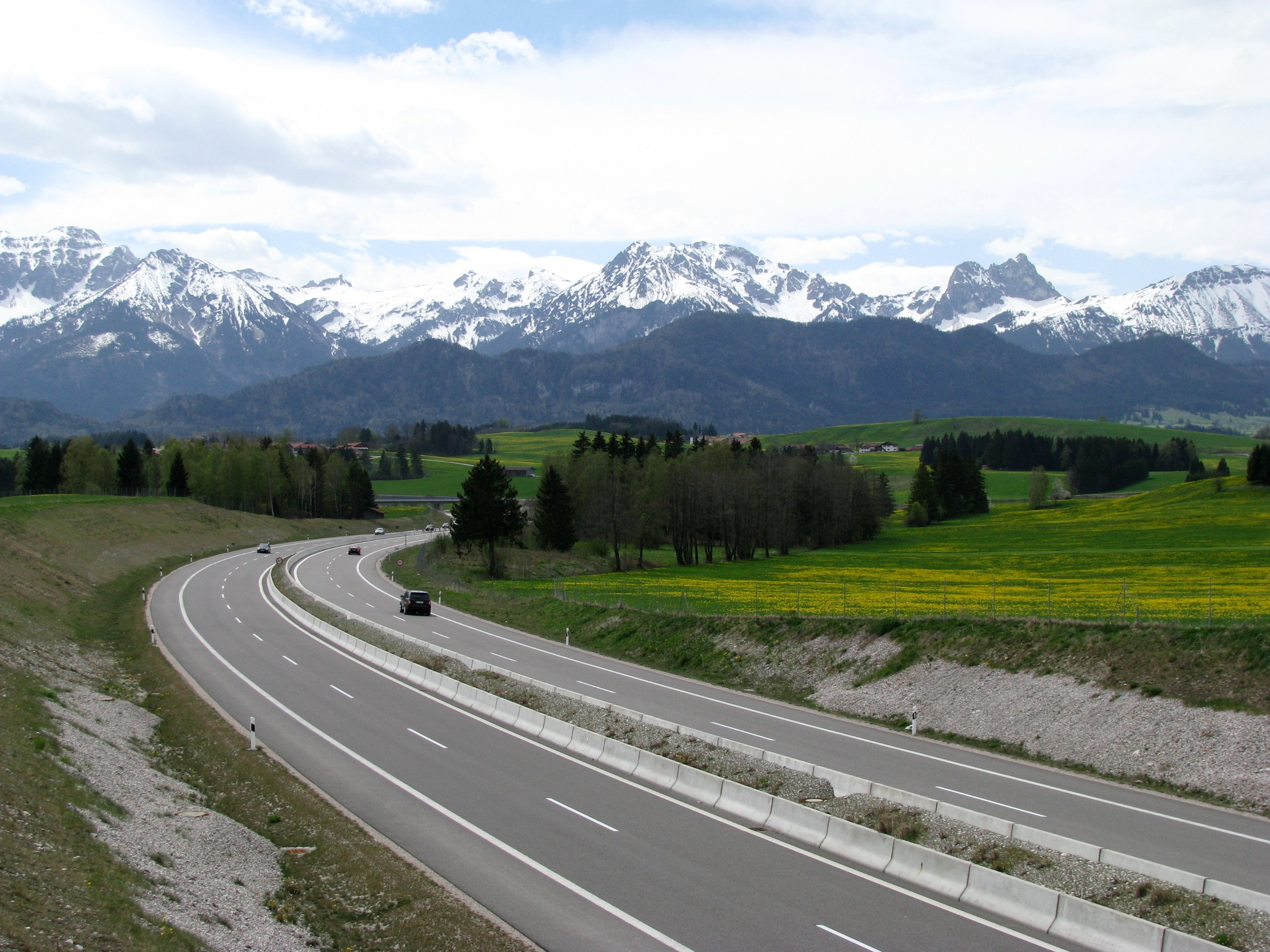
The expressway near Füssen

The highway replaced as a trunk connection the imperial or federal roads 76, 77, 205 and 4 (Flensburg-Hamburg), 3 (Hamburg-Kassel) and 27 (Göttingen-Würzburg), which in turn went back to medieval precursors. On the route between Flensburg and Hamburg, for example, it follows the historic Ochsenweg and can be described as its successor in terms of its importance as a trade route from Scandinavia to the south. Plans for a highway from Hamburg to the south were made in the framework of the HaFraBa from 1926. This project is considered to be the predecessor of the A7 between Hamburg and the Hattenbacher Dreieck.

The first section opened from Göttingen to Bad Hersfeld in 1937. Construction of the section between Bad Hersfeld and Würzburg (Strecke 46) began in 1937 with various bridge structures built however the road wasn't completed before war broke out in 1939 and construction was stopped before being fully abandoned in 1940. After World War 2 the route of A7 was altered leaving some of the abandoned bridge structures of Strecke 46 to be preserved as historic monuments.

From the 1950s, the highway was built between the A 1 south of Hamburg and the existing part of the A7 near Göttingen and opened in sections. At the A1 the "Horster triangle" was created as the new beginning of the A7. From the south (Hanover) coming vehicles had there at the threading to the A1 in the direction of west (Bremen) drive through a steep curve for many years.

The section Echte-Seesen was opened on 14 November 1959. The section Seesen Hildesheim was opened on 15 December 1960 by Secretary of Transportation Seebohm.

From 1956, the seven sections between Hamburg and Hanover were handed over to traffic. In 1960, the 21 km section between junction Berkhof and the cross Hannover / Kirchhorst was opened last.

The four remaining sections in between were opened in 1958. The gap closure was achieved with the 35 km section between motorway junction Hannover / Kirchhorst and junction Hildesheim in 1962.

In the 1960s, the A7 was then built on a slightly different route. The first to be opened in 1965 was the 10.9 km section north of the Biebelried interchange to the junction Würzburg / Estenfeld. 1966 followed the adjacent section to the present cross Schweinfurt / Werneck and the 14.8 km long section between Fulda North and Fulda South. The northernmost section from the Hattenbacher Triangle to Fulda (32 km) and the middle section between Fulda and Schweinfurt (68 km) were finally handed over to traffic in 1968.

In the 1960s and 1970s, the highway was built in the Hamburg area and the so-called north axis to Denmark and handed over to traffic. The construction took place in nine sections. An important milestone was the opening of the New Elbe Tunnel in 1975. On 13 July 1976, Ernst Haar, Parliamentary State Secretary of the Federal Ministry of Transport, and Schleswig-Holstein's Minister of the Interior Rudolf Titzck solemnly opened the motorway section from Tarp to Handewitt. Only in 1978, the last vacant space between Tarp and Schuby was closed, so that the highway could be driven from Hamburg to the federal border.

On 13 June 1978, Queen Margrethe II and President Walter Scheel opened the border crossing Ellund, accompanied by Prime Minister Gerhard Stoltenberg and the Flensburg Mayor Ingrid Gross. At 10.55 clock they officially released the freeway and passport control, at 12.32 clock rolled the first car through the new border crossing. Ellund developed into the most important transit point of German-Danish border traffic. In 1979, 3.2 million travelers passed the counters; until 1997, the number had more than quintupled at 16.7 million.

In the preliminary draft for a motor vehicle road network of Germany of the study company for automotive road construction (STUFA) of 1926 a highway Würzburg-Ulm-Lindau was provided, detail planning took place from 1935 to 1941. In 1969, the states of Bavaria and Baden-Württemberg were able to agree on a line parallel to the federal highway 19.

From 1972 first sections could be released. It started with the Berkheim section to junction Memmingen-Süd (9.4 km) and the first 27.1 km long directional lane between Bad Grönenbach and Kempten-Leubas.

Major sections were between Kreuz Biebelried and junction Uffenheim-Langensteinach (34.7 km) in 1980, the southern extension to the junction Feuchtwangen (42.1 km) in 1985 and further to the junction Heidenheim (59.6 km) opened in 1987. Since the last 6.8 kilometers to the junction Oy-Mittelberg were already released a year ago, the highway was already passable from Denmark to the Allgäu.

In 1992, the A7 was extended by another 4.9 km to Nesselwang. A few meters west of the junction of the same name is the highest motorway point in Germany: "914.081 m above sea level. NN".

In July 1999, the opening of the border tunnel Füssen to Tyrol followed with a tube and two lanes. The tunnel is supposed to relieve the surrounding communities of the high traffic volume during vacation time. In 2005, the northern adjoining first directional lane was opened up to the county road at Gunzenberg. Until September 2009, traffic from the end of the motorway at Nesselwang was routed via various routes for cars and trucks to the border tunnel, which often led to traffic jams.

On 1 September 2009 was the official inauguration of the last 15-kilometer section, which was released more than a year late. The viaduct Enzenstetten was initially only one-way passable, as the construction-performing consortium could not complete it on time. The second half of the bridge went into operation in December 2010, to the Austrian border.

== Recent changes ==
The highway is from the Danish border to the Bordesholmer triangle with the A 215 four-lane expanded. To triangle Hamburg northwest with the A 23 are several sections since 2016/2017 six-lane, the remaining four-lobed sections are expected to end of 2019 six lanes expanded. It follows a six-lane section to the junction Hamburg-Bahrenfeld. Thereafter, eight lanes will be available in the Elbtunnels area. In the further course there are again six lanes, between the triangle Hamburg-southwest (A 261) and the Horster triangle (A 1) only four.

Between Hamburg and Hildesheim, the motorway has six lanes, with the exception of the four-lane section between the Soltau-Ost junction and the Walsrode junction (A 27). In this four-lane section can be released with a traffic control system as needed both hard shoulder as each third lane.

In this area, the highway was in early 2009 despite the heavy traffic largely from only four lanes. Only in a few gradient areas there was an additional third lane available. By the end of 2016, several sections were expanded. About half of the road is widened to six lanes.

Between Nörten-Hardenberg and the Hattenbacher Dreieck, the highway is consistently expanded to six-lane. South of Kassel, as well as between the Kirchheim triangle and the Hattenbacher triangle, there is an additional fourth lane on inclines in the direction of south. Because of the steep climbs and gradients, the section is known as the Kassel mountains and is considered by motorists to be particularly demanding for trucks and caravans.

Throughout the southern section, the A7 is four lanes. Only a few sections have more than two strips per directional lane. The highway ends since 1 September 2009 at the border tunnel Füssen. This contains only one tube with one lane per direction. In the area of the valley bridge Enzenstetten the A7 was only two-lane drivable until the completion of the second bridge in December 2010.

== Under construction ==
The A7 is being upgraded from the Bordesholm motorway intersection to the Hamburg Northwest motorway junction on 65 kilometers from four to six lanes. This measure will be realized through a public-private partnership and should cost a total of 600 million euros. The official starting signal for the major project in Schleswig-Holstein was on 1 September 2014. Already in May, preparations were started, especially in Hamburg. The expansion should take place until 2018. On 16 December 2016, Prime Minister Albig released the first section of the 6-lane A7 between the Bordesholm motorway junction and the AS Neumünster-Nord interchange. It has been agreed that the operating company will carry out the remaining work on the six-kilometer stretch between Neumünster and Bordesholm and then transfer it to the state of Schleswig-Holstein. The other 59 kilometers operates and receives the company until 2044. Since March, a 9.9-kilometer section at Großenaspe is six-lane expanded. On 7 April 2017, another expanded section was released by Prime Minister Albig. It is about 10 kilometers between the junctions Kaltenkirchen and Quickborn. At the end of the decade the realization of the project can be expected.

As part of the widening works, the A7 north of the Elbtunnel three covers of the highway are provided in Schnelsen, Stellingen, Othmarschen and Bahrenfeld. The allotments that have existed in the area for 90 years are to be "relocated" to these and thus ensure that the districts separated by the motorway grow together again. In addition to 25 hectares of green space and 3000 apartments to be created. The plan approval decision for the six-lane expansion between the triangle Hamburg-Nordwest and Schnelsen was made on 15 December 2012. After the end of the current construction measures, the lids should have a total length of 3.8 kilometers. In addition to 240 million euros from the federal government, 160 to 240 million euros will go to the city of Hamburg for noise control measures.

In the further demand with planning right the six-lane development of the A7 over the connection point Soltau-Ost was planned up to the triangle Walsrode. On 30 March 2012, the federal government began planning for the six-lane expansion. The expansion is divided into three sections: triangle Walsrode to Bad Fallingbostel, Bad Fallingbostel to Dorfmark and Dorfmark to Soltau-Ost. For the section triangle Walsrode to Bad Fallingbostel, the plan approval decision was issued on 4 August 2015. Since the end of October there is building law for this section. 58 million euros were released in December 2015. Construction work began in early 2016 and construction began in August 2016. Construction of this section is expected to be ready in 2019. For the other two sections the design planning is running.

The six-lane widening of the sections from Soltau-Ost to Fallingbostel has been classified as an urgent need since 2016. The further eight-lane expansion to the triangle Hannover-Nord is only in the further need. On 29 January 2016, the planning approval procedure was initiated to expand the tank and rest area Allertal and to build the Allertal junction. The short four-lane section to the north of the Salzgitter triangle with the A 39 was upgraded to a priority requirement in 2016 with the amendment of the Fernstraßenausbaugesetz - bottleneck elimination. The continuation to Göttingen is unannounced plan-established, with the exception of the sections between Seesen and Nörten-Hardenberg already finished six-lane expansion and is in the status of ongoing and firmly scheduled in the highway development law.

From June 2012 to June 2013, a public-private partnership (PPP) was examined for the extension of the line between Seesen and Nörten-Hardenberg. According to this audit report of the Federal Court of Auditors, the expansion would not be cheaper in a PPP, but by 12.8 million euros more expensive. The project was awarded with the contract beginning 1 May 2017 to the consortium Via Niedersachsen with the shareholders VINCI Concessions Deutschland GmbH and Meridiam Investments. On 26 August 2015, the planning approval procedure was initiated for the conversion and expansion of the tank and service facility Göttingen with the construction of the Rosdorf exit.

The section between the future triangle Kassel-Ost and the triangle Kassel-Süd is under construction into eight lanes, since the total traffic of the A7 and the A44 shares this route. Construction began in fall 2011 and is expected to be completed in 2022. First, the noise protection is expanded. The additional lanes are created by making lanes and median strips narrower. In the course of the expansion, the refueling and rest area Kassel (-West and -Ost) was dismantled and rebuilt at the location of the Rastanlage Kassel-Ost between 2016 and 2018.

Crossing the Kiel Canal near Rendsburg, a new bridge is under construction (Rader Hochbrücke).

== In planning stages ==
The A20 is to be connected at the level Bad Bramstedt via a motorway junction to the A7. At the south of the Hamburg Elbe Tunnel, the highway to the planned motorway junction Hamburg-Süderelbe with the federal highway 26 is eight stripe to be expanded. This should be implemented by 2022.

Current plans of the Federal Ministry of Transport provide an intersection of the A26 at the future motorway intersection Hamburg-Süderelbe south of the Elbe, where it will continue east through Wilhelmsburg as a so-called port passage to A1 with a motorway junction Hamburg-Stillhorn. In May 2011, funding was approved by the Federal Ministry of Transport.

To the east of Würzburg, between Kreuz Schweinfurt / Werneck and Kreuz Biebelried an expansion to six strips in the further need with planning right classified. On 15 June 2016, during the construction of the Schraudenbach valley bridge near Schraudenbach, the shoring collapsed during the concreting of a superstructure section. The accident cost the life of a construction worker. In addition, there were 14 life-threatening injuries.

The six-lane widening of the A7 in the section between the AD Hittistetten and the AS Illertissen was included in the Federal Transport Infrastructure Plan 2030 and the Highway Act as urgent needs, the further expansion to the junction Memmingen-South is added as a further need with planning law.

== Strecke 46 ==
Through the Rhön Mountains and Spessart, where the autobahn was known as Strecke 46 (Route 46), some bridges were built as early as 1937, but construction was halted in October 1939 by World War II. In 1954, the Strecke 46 route was abandoned and the final stretch of the A 7 in this area was later built on a slightly different route and finally completed in 1968. The remains of Strecke 46 have been classified as a listed building in 2003 by the government of Bavaria.

== Exit list ==
State	District	Location	km	mi	Exit	Name	Destinations	Notes
Schleswig-Holstein	Schleswig-Flensburg	Handewitt			1	Grenzübergang Ellund	E45 – Kolding	northern endpoint of motorway Border crossing no longer operational since 2001 crossing equipped with parking areas northern endpoint of concurrency with the E45 european road
Schleswig-Holstein	Schleswig-Flensburg	Handewitt			2	Flensburg/Harrislee	B 199 – Flensburg, Harrislee, Handewitt, Niebüll, Leck	
Schleswig-Holstein	Schleswig-Flensburg	Handewitt			Handewitter Forst/Altholzkrug; Handewitter Forst parking area (southbound) / Altholzkrug parking area (northbound)			
Schleswig-Holstein	Schleswig-Flensburg	Handewitt			3	Flensburg	B 200 – Flensburg, Glücksburg, Kappeln, Husum, Bredstedt	Glücksburg is only signed northbound Bredstedt is only signed southbound
Schleswig-Holstein	Schleswig-Flensburg	Sieverstedt			4	Tarp	Tarp, Sörup, Bredstedt	Bredstedt is only signed northbound
Schleswig-Holstein	Schleswig-Flensburg	Sieverstedt			Jalm/Jalmer Moor; Jalmer Moor parking area (southbound)/Jalm parking area (northbound)			
Schleswig-Holstein	Schleswig-Flensburg	Lürschau			Arenholzer See parking area (northbound)			
Schleswig-Holstein	Schleswig-Flensburg	Schuby			5	Schleswig/Schuby	B 201 – Schleswig, Schuby, Kappeln, Husum	Kappeln is only signed northbound
Schleswig-Holstein	Schleswig-Flensburg	Hüsby			Hüsby parking area (southbound)			
Schleswig-Holstein	Schleswig-Flensburg	Busdorf			6	Schleswig/Jagel	B 77 – Schleswig, Jagel, Kropp	Kropp is only signed southbound
Schleswig-Holstein	Schleswig-Flensburg	Lottorf			Lottorf parking area (northbound)			
Schleswig-Holstein	Rendsburg-Eckernförde	Owschlag			7	Owschlag	Eckernförde, Owschlag, Brekendorf, Kropp	Kropp is only signed northbound Eckernförde is only signed southbound
Schleswig-Holstein	Rendsburg-Eckernförde	Alt Duvenstedt			Hüttener Berge rest area			
Schleswig-Holstein	Rendsburg-Eckernförde	Borgstedt			8	Rendsburg/Büdelsdorf	B 203 – Damp, Eckernförde, Rendsburg, Büdelsdorf, Heide	Damp and Eckernförde are only signed northbound Heide is only signed southbound
Schleswig-Holstein	Rendsburg-Eckernförde	Kiel Canal			Radar High Bridge (Length: 1.498 km (0.931 mi)); Kiel Canal; Bridge is currently rebuild and widened to 6 lanes			
Schleswig-Holstein	Rendsburg-Eckernförde	Schülldorf			9	Rendsburg interchange	A 210 – Kiel, Itzehoe, Rendsburg-Mitte	Itzehoe is only signed southbound
Schleswig-Holstein	Rendsburg-Eckernförde	Schülldorf			Ohe parking area			
Schleswig-Holstein	Rendsburg-Eckernförde	Warder			10	Warder	Warder, Nortorf, Westensee	Nortorf is only signed southbound
Schleswig-Holstein	Rendsburg-Eckernförde	Dätgen			Dätgen parking area (northbound)			
Schleswig-Holstein	Rendsburg-Eckernförde	Dätgen			11	Bordesholm	Plön, Bordesholm	Plön is only signed southbound
Schleswig-Holstein	Rendsburg-Eckernförde	Schönbek			12	Bordesholm interchange	A 215 – Kiel, Blumenthal	no ramps between Kiel and Flensburg motorway widens form 4 to 6 lanes
Schleswig-Holstein	Neumünster	Einfeld			13	Neumünster-Nord	Neumünster-Nord, Nortorf	Nortorf is only signed northbound
Schleswig-Holstein	Neumünster	Gartenstadt			Aalbek rest area (southbound)			
Schleswig-Holstein	Rendsburg-Eckernförde	Wasbek			14	Neumünster-Mitte	B 430 – Neumünster-Mitte, Itzehoe, Hohenwestedt	Itzehoe is only signed southbound
Schleswig-Holstein	Rendsburg-Eckernförde	Padenstedt			15	Neumünster-Süd	B 205 – Neumünster-Süd, Lübeck, Bad Segeberg	Lübeck and Bad Segeberg are only signed southbound
Schleswig-Holstein	Segeberg	Großenaspe			Brokenlande rest area (northbound)			
Schleswig-Holstein	Segeberg	Großenaspe			16	Großenaspe	Großenaspe, Plön, Bad Bramstedt-Nord	Plön is only signed northbound Bad Bramstedt-Nord is only signed southbound
Schleswig-Holstein	Segeberg	Bimöhlen			Bimöhlen parking area (southbound) / Sielsbrook parking area (northbound)			
Schleswig-Holstein	Segeberg	Bad Bramstedt			17	Bad Bramstedt	B 206 – Bad Bramstedt, Lübeck, Bad Segeberg	
Schleswig-Holstein	Segeberg	Lentföhrden				Bad Bramstedt interchange	A 20 – Stade, Lübeck	interchange proposed
Schleswig-Holstein	Segeberg	Nützen			18	Kaltenkirchen	Kaltenkirchen, Elmshorn	
Schleswig-Holstein	Segeberg	Kaltenkirchen			Moorkaten parking area			
Schleswig-Holstein	Segeberg	Kaltenkirchen			19	Henstedt-Ulzburg	Henstedt-Ulzburg, Kaltenkirchen-Süd	
Schleswig-Holstein	Pinneberg	Quickborn			21	Quickborn	Quickborn, Pinneberg, Norderstedt-Nord	Pinneberg is only signed southbound
Schleswig-Holstein	Pinneberg	Quickborn			Holmmoor rest area			
Schleswig-Holstein	Pinneberg	Bönningstedt			Bönningstedt parking area			
Hamburg	Eimsbüttel	Schnelsen			23	Hamburg-Schnelsen-Nord	B 432 – Hamburg-Schnelsen-Nord, Norderstedt-Süd	
Hamburg	Eimsbüttel	Schnelsen			24	Hamburg-Schnelsen	B 447 – Hamburg-Schnelsen, Hamburg-Niendorf	HH-Niendorf is only signed northbound
Hamburg	Eimsbüttel	Schnelsen			Schnelsen tunnel (Length:580 m (1,900 ft))			
Hamburg	Eimsbüttel	Eidelstedt			25	Hamburg-Nordwest interchange	A 23 – Husum, Heide, Hamburg-Eidelstedt	motorway widens form 6 to 8 lanes
Hamburg	Eimsbüttel	Stellingen			Stellingen tunnel (Length: 893 m (2,930 ft))			
Hamburg	Eimsbüttel	Stellingen			26	Hamburg-Stellingen	B 4 / B 5 – Hamburg-Stellingen	
Hamburg	Altona	Bahrenfeld			27	Hamburg-Volkspark	Hamburg-Volkspark, Hamburg-Centrum	road narrows down from 8 to 6 lanes (widening to 8 lanes under construction)
Hamburg	Altona	Bahrenfeld			Altona tunnel (Length: 2.230 km (1.386 mi); Tunnel under construction along with a widening to 8 lanes			
Hamburg	Altona	Bahrenfeld			28	Hamburg-Bahrenfeld	B 431 – Hamburg-Bahrenfeld	
Hamburg	Altona	Othmarschen			29	Hamburg-Othmarschen	Hamburg-Othmarschen	
Hamburg	Altona/Mitte	Elbe river			Elbe Tunnel (Length: 3.1 km (1.9 mi)); Elbe river 4 tubes with 2 lanes each			
Hamburg	Mitte	Waltershof			Hochstraße Elbmarsch (Length: 4.258 km (2.646 mi))			
Hamburg	Mitte	Waltershof			30	Hamburg-Waltershof	B 3 – Hamburg-Waltershof, Hamburg-Finkenwerder, Hamburg-Hafen	
Hamburg	Harburg	Moorburg				Hamburg-Süderelbe interchange	A 26 – Stade, Hamburg-Bergedorf	interchange under construction
Hamburg	Harburg	Heimfeld			31	Hamburg-Hausbruch	Hamburg-Hausbruch, Hafen Harburg	
Hamburg	Harburg	Heimfeld			32	Hamburg-Heimfeld	B 73 – Hamburg-Heimfeld, Hamburg-Harburg, Cuxhaven	
Hamburg	Harburg	Eißendorf			33	Hamburg-Südwest interchange	A 261 – Bremen, Tötensen	no ramps between Bremen and Hanover road narrows down from 6 to 4 lanes
Hamburg	Harburg	Marmstorf			34	Hamburg-Marmstorf	B 75 – Hamburg-Marmstorf, Hamburg-Harburg	HH-Harburg is only signed northbound
Hamburg	Harburg	Sinstorf			Harburger Berge rest area			
Lower Saxony	Harburg	Seevetal			35	Seevetal-Fleestedt	Seevetal-Fleestedt, Seevetal-Hittfeld, Hamburg-Sinstorf	Seevetal-Hittfeld is only signed southbound
Lower Saxony	Harburg	Seevetal			36	Maschen interchange	A 39 – Lüneburg, Seevetal-Maschen; A 1 / E22 – Lübeck, Berlin, Bremen (via A 39)	no ramps from/to Hanover
Lower Saxony	Harburg	Seevetal			37	Horst interchange	A 1 / E22 – Lüneburg, Berlin, Hamburg, Lüneburg, Bremen, Seevetal-Hittfeld	no ramps from/to Hamburg (A 7) road widens from 4 to 6 lanes
Lower Saxony	Harburg	Seevetal			Seevetal rest area (northbound)			
Lower Saxony	Harburg	Seevetal			38	Seevetal-Ramelsloh	Seevetal-Ramelsloh, Seevetal-Ohlendorf	
Lower Saxony	Harburg	Seevetal			Hasselhöhe rest area (southbound)			
Lower Saxony	Harburg	Brackel			39	Thieshope	Thieshope, Hanstedt, Winsen (Luhe), Brackel	Hanstedt is only signed southbound Winsen (Luhe) is only signed northbound
Lower Saxony	Harburg	Brackel			Eichberg parking area (northbound)			
Lower Saxony	Harburg	Toppenstedt			Utspann parking area (northbound)			
Lower Saxony	Harburg	Garlstorf			40	Garlstorf	Garlstorf, Salzhausen, Handorf, Nindorf	Salzhausen is only signed southbound Handorf is only signed northbound
Lower Saxony	Harburg	Garlstorf			Garlstorfer Wald rest area (southbound) / Schaapskaben rest area (northbound)			
Lower Saxony	Harburg	Egestorf			41	Egestorf	Egestorf, Lübberstedt, Eyendorf, Salzhausen	Salzhausen is only signed northbound
Lower Saxony	Harburg	Egestorf			42	Evendorf	Evendorf, Amelinghausen, Döhle	
Lower Saxony	Heidekreis	Bispingen			Auegrund parking area (southbound)			
Lower Saxony	Heidekreis	Bispingen			Vorm Naturschutzpark parking area (southbound)			
Lower Saxony	Heidekreis	Bispingen			Lüneburger Heide rest area			
Lower Saxony	Heidekreis	Bispingen			43	Bispingen	Bispingen, Behringen	
Lower Saxony	Heidekreis	Bispingen			Bispinger Tor parking area (northbound)			
Lower Saxony	Heidekreis	Bispingen			43a	Schneverdingen	B 3 – Schneverdingen, Munster, Bispingen, Neuenkirchen	Munster and Neuenkirchen are only signed southbound
Lower Saxony	Heidekreis	Soltau			Timmerloh parking area (southbound) / Wilseder Berg parking area (northbound)			
Lower Saxony	Heidekreis	Soltau			44	Soltau-Ost	B 71 – Soltau, Munster, Uelzen; B 209 – Lüneburg	Uelzen and Lüneburg are only signed southbound road narrows down from 6 to 4 lanes
Lower Saxony	Heidekreis	Soltau			Wietzenbruch rest area (southbound) / Abelbeck-Kuhbusch rest area (northbound)			
Lower Saxony	Heidekreis	Soltau			45	Soltau-Süd	B 3 – Soltau, Celle, Bergen, Wietzendorf	Celle is only signed southbound
Lower Saxony	Heidekreis	Bad Fallingbostel			Dorfmark parking area (northbound)			
Lower Saxony	Heidekreis	Bad Fallingbostel			46	Dorfmark	B 440 – Dorfmark, Visselhövede	
Lower Saxony	Heidekreis	Bad Fallingbostel			Steinbach parking area (southbound)			
Lower Saxony	Heidekreis	Bad Fallingbostel			47	Bad Fallingbostel	B 209 – Bad Fallingbostel, Walsrode, Oerbke	Walsrode is only signed southbound road widens from 4 to 6 lanes
Lower Saxony	Heidekreis	Walsrode			Wolfsgrund rest area			
Lower Saxony	Heidekreis	Walsrode			48	Walsrode interchange	A 27 / E234 – Bremen, Walsrode	road widens from 6 to 8 lanes
Lower Saxony	Heidekreis	Walsrode			49	Westenholz	Westenholz, Ostenholz, Hodenhagen, Krelingen	
Lower Saxony	Heidekreis	Essel			Allertal rest area			
Lower Saxony	Heidekreis	Buchholz (Aller)			50	Schwarmstedt	B 214 – Schwarmstedt, Nienburg, Celle, Wietze	
Lower Saxony	Heidekreis	Buchholz (Aller)			Südhorn parking area			
Lower Saxony	Region Hannover	Wedemark			51	Berkhof	Berkhof	
Lower Saxony	Region Hannover	Wedemark			Osterriehe parking area (southbound) / Up'n Bummelskampe parking area (northbound)			
Lower Saxony	Region Hannover	Wedemark			52	Mellendorf	Mellendorf, Celle, Fuhrberg, Bissendorf	Celle is only signed northbound
Lower Saxony	Region Hannover	Wedemark			53	Hannover-Nord interchange	A 352 – Dortmund, Hannover-Nord	no ramps between Dortmund and Kassel
Lower Saxony	Region Hannover	Burgwedel			Seckbruch parking area (southbound) / Springhorst parking area (northbound)			
Lower Saxony	Region Hannover	Burgwedel			54	Großburgwedel	Großburgwedel, Isernhagen-Hohenhorster Bauerschaft	
Lower Saxony	Region Hannover	Isernhagen			55	Altwarmbüchen	Altwarmbüchen, Kirchhorst	
Lower Saxony	Region Hannover	Isernhagen			56	Hannover/Kirchhorst interchange	A 37 / B 3 – Hannover-Messe, Celle, Burgdorf, Beinhorn, Dortmund	Beinhorn and Dortmund are only signed northbound
Lower Saxony	Region Hannover	Hannover			Altwarmbüchener Moor parking area (northbound)			
Lower Saxony	Region Hannover	Lehrte			57	Hannover-Ost interchange	A 2 / E30 – Berlin, Braunschweig, Dortmund, Hannover	
Lower Saxony	Region Hannover	Hannover			58	Hannover-Anderten	B 65 – Hannover-Anderten, Hannover-Misburg, Sehnde, Ahlten	Sehnde and Hannover-Misburg are only signed southbound Ahlten is only signed northbound
Lower Saxony	Region Hannover	Hannover			Hannover-Wülferode rest area			
Lower Saxony	Region Hannover	Laatzen			59	Laatzen	B 443 – Laatzen, Pattensen, Sarstedt, Sehnde	Sarstedt is only signed southbound Sehnde is only signed northbound
Lower Saxony	Region Hannover	Sehnde			60	Hannover-Süd interchange	A 37 – Hannover-Messe	no ramps between Hamburg and Hanover
Lower Saxony	Hildesheim	Sarstedt			An der Alpe parking area			
Lower Saxony	Hildesheim	Hildesheim			61	Hildesheim-Drispenstedt	B 494 – Hildesheim-Drispenstedt, Hohenhameln, Harsum	
Lower Saxony	Hildesheim	Hildesheim			62	Hildesheim	B 1 – Hildesheim, Alfeld, Elze, Hoheneggelsen, Sarstedt, Bettmar	Alfeld and Hoheneggelsen are only signed southbound Sarstedt and Bettmar are only signed northbound road narrows down from 6 to 5 lanes (2 lanes southbound, 3 lanes northbound)
Lower Saxony	Hildesheim	Bad Salzdetfurth			Hildesheimer Börde rest area			
Lower Saxony	Hildesheim	Holle			63	Derneburg/Salzgitter	B 6 – Salzgitter, Goslar, Derneburg, Peine, Hoheneggelsen, Grasdorf	Salzgitter and Goslar are only signed southbound Peine, Hoheneggelsen and Grasdorf are only signed northbound road narrows down from 5 to 4 lanes
Lower Saxony	Hildesheim	Holle			64	Salzgitter interchange	A 39 – Berlin, Braunschweig, Salzgitter	road widens from 4 to 6 lanes
Lower Saxony	Hildesheim	Holle			Jägerturm parking area			
Lower Saxony	Hildesheim	Bockenem			65	Bockenem	B 243 – Bockenem, Bad Salzdetfurth, Lutter am Barenberge	Bad Salzdetfurth is only signed northbound
Lower Saxony	Hildesheim	Bockenem			Ambergau parking area			
Lower Saxony	Goslar	Seesen			66	Rhüden/Harz	B 82 – Rhüden/Harz, Lamspringe, Bad Harzburg, Goslar	
Lower Saxony	Goslar	Seesen			Harz rest area			
Lower Saxony	Goslar	Seesen			67	Seesen/Harz	B 243 / B 248 – Seesen/Harz, Osterode am Harz ( B 64), Clausthal-Zellerfeld, Bad Gandersheim ( B 64)	
Lower Saxony	Goslar	Seesen			Schwalenberg parking area			
Lower Saxony	Northeim	Kalefeld			68	Echte	B 445 – Echte, Bad Gandersheim, Kreiensen, Kalefeld	Bad Gandersheim and Kreiensen are only signed northbound
Lower Saxony	Northeim	Kalefeld			Am Bierberg parking area			
Lower Saxony	Northeim	Northeim			69	Northeim-Nord	B 3 – Northeim-Nord, Duderstadt, Einbeck, Alfeld, Hameln	Duderstadt is only signed southbound Alfeld and Hameln are only signed northbound
Lower Saxony	Northeim	Northeim			Schlochau parking area parking area named after the former german city of Schlochau (now Człuchów, Poland)			
Lower Saxony	Northeim	Northeim			70	Northeim-West	B 241 – Northeim-West, Moringen, Osterode am Harz	Osterode am Harz is only signed northbound
Lower Saxony	Northeim	Nörten-Hardenberg			71	Nörten-Hardenberg	B 446 – Nörten-Hardenberg, Uslar/Solling, Hardegsen	
Lower Saxony	Göttingen	Bovenden			Leineholz parking area			
Lower Saxony	Göttingen	Göttingen			72	Göttingen-Nord	B 27 – Göttingen-Nord, Bovenden, Duderstadt, Adelebsen	Duderstadt is only signed northbound
Lower Saxony	Göttingen	Göttingen			73	Göttingen	B 3 – Göttingen, Rosdorf, Dransfeld	
Lower Saxony	Göttingen	Rosdorf			Göttingen rest area			
Lower Saxony	Göttingen	Rosdorf			74	Drammetal interchange	A 38 – Leipzig, Halle, Nordhausen	
Lower Saxony	Göttingen	Hann. Münden			Hedemünden parking area			
Lower Saxony	Göttingen	Hann. Münden			75	Hann. Münden-Hedemünden	B 80 – Hann. Münden-Hedemünden, Witzenhausen, Bad Sooden-Allendorf	
Lower Saxony	Göttingen	Hann. Münden			Humboldtblick parking area (southbound)			
Lower Saxony	Göttingen	Staufenberg			76	Hann. Münden/Staufenberg-Lutterberg	B 496 – Hann. Münden, Staufenberg-Lutterberg, Bad Karlshafen	Bad Karlshafen is only signed northbound
Lower Saxony	Göttingen	Staufenberg			Staufenberg parking area (northbound)			
Hesse	Kassel	Niestetal			Herkulesblick parking area (southbound)			
Hesse	Kassel	Niestetal			77	Kassel-Nord	Kassel-Nord, Flughafen Kassel-Calden, Niestetal	
Hesse	Kassel	Niestetal			78	Kassel-Ost	B 7 – Kassel-Ost, Eisenach, Eschwege, Kaufungen	Interchange with A 44 motorway planned Planned northern endpoint of concurrency with A 44 motorway
Hesse	Kassel	Lohfelden			79	Kassel-Mitte interchange	A 49 – Marburg, Kassel	
Hesse	Kassel	Lohfelden			Kassel-Ost rest area no entrance ramps, entrance possible by a direct ramp to the A 49 motorway and the previous interchange			
Hesse	Kassel	Lohfelden			80	Kassel-Süd interchange	A 44 / E331 – Dortmund, Paderborn, Kassel-West interchange	Planned southern endpoint of concurrency with A 44 motorway
Hesse	Schwalm-Eder-Kreis	Guxhagen			81	Guxhagen	B 83 – Guxhagen, Körle, Baunatal, Edermünde	Baunatal is only signed northbound
Hesse	Schwalm-Eder-Kreis	Felsberg			Markwald parking area			
Hesse	Schwalm-Eder-Kreis	Felsberg			82	Melsungen	B 253 – Melsungen, Felsberg	
Hesse	Schwalm-Eder-Kreis	Malsfeld			83	Malsfeld	Malsfeld, Spangenberg, Rotenburg an der Fulda	Rotenburg an der Fulda is only signed southbound
Hesse	Schwalm-Eder-Kreis	Knüllwald			Hasselberg rest area			
Hesse	Schwalm-Eder-Kreis	Knüllwald			84	Homberg (Efze)	B 323 – Homberg (Efze), Bad Wildungen, Fritzlar, Knüllwald	
Hesse	Schwalm-Eder-Kreis	Knüllwald			Fuchsrain parking area (northbound)			
Hesse	Hersfeld-Rotenburg	Neuenstein			Am Pommer parking area (southbound)			
Hesse	Hersfeld-Rotenburg	Neuenstein			85	Bad Hersfeld-West	B 324 – Bad Hersfeld, Neuenstein, Schwarzenborn	Schwarzenborn is only signed northbound
Hesse	Hersfeld-Rotenburg	Kirchheim			86	Kirchheim interchange	A 4 / E40 – Berlin, Dresden, Erfurt, Bad Hersfeld	northern endpoint of concurrency with the E40 european road
Hesse	Hersfeld-Rotenburg	Kirchheim			87	Kirchheim	B 454 – Kirchheim, Niederaula	
Hesse	Hersfeld-Rotenburg	Niederaula			88	Hattenbach interchange	A 5 / E40 – Basel, Frankfurt, Wiesbaden, Gießen	southern endpoint of concurrency with the E40 european road road narrows down from 6 to 4 lanes Wiesbaden is only signed southbound
Hesse	Hersfeld-Rotenburg	Niederaula			Strampen parking area (southbound) / Ottersbach parking area (northbound)			
Hesse	Hersfeld-Rotenburg	Niederaula			89	Niederaula	B 62 – Niederaula, Bad Hersfeld, Breitenbach am Herzberg, Schlitz	Schlitz is only signed southbound Bad Hersfeld is only signed northbound
Hesse	Hersfeld-Rotenburg	Niederaula			Richtgraben parking area (northbound)			
Hesse	Hersfeld-Rotenburg	Haunetal			Dornbusch parking area (southbound)			
Hesse	Fulda	Burghaun			Großenmoor rest area			
Hesse	Fulda	Burghaun			Güntherswald parking area (southbound) / Mahlertshof parking area (northbound)			
Hesse	Fulda	Hünfeld			90	Hünfeld/Schlitz	Hünfeld, Schlitz, Tann (Rhön), Bad Salzschlirf	Tann (Rhön) is only signed southbound
Hesse	Fulda	Hünfeld			Fuchsberg parking area (southbound)			
Hesse	Fulda	Fulda			Hummelskopf parking area (southbound) / Rotkopf parking area (northbound)			
Hesse	Fulda	Fulda			Geißhecke parking area (northbound)			
Hesse	Fulda	Petersberg			91	Fulda-Nord	B 27 – Fulda-Nord, Künzell-Nord, Tann (Rhön), Hünfeld-Süd	Künzell-Nord is only signed southbound Tann (Rhön) and Hünfeld-Süd are only signed northbound
Hesse	Fulda	Petersberg			Rauschenberg parking area (southbound) / Petersberg parking area (northbound)			
Hesse	Fulda	Petersberg			92	Fulda-Mitte	B 458 – Fulda, Hilders, Petersburg, Künzell	
Hesse	Fulda	Künzell			Röther Tannen parking area (southbound)			
Hesse	Fulda	Eichenzell			Pilgerzell parking area (southbound)			
Hesse	Fulda	Eichenzell			93	Fulda interchange	A 66 – Frankfurt, Hanau, Fulda-Süd	
Hesse	Fulda	Eichenzell			Steinhauk parking area (southbound) / Riederberg parking area (northbound)			
Hesse	Fulda	Eichenzell			Steinborntal parking area (southbound) / Lohmühle parking area (northbound)			
Hesse	Fulda	Kalbach			Uttrichshausen rest area			
Hesse	Fulda	Kalbach			Am Forsthaus parking area (southbound) / Rhöneiche parking area (northbound)			
Bavaria	Bad Kissingen	Römershager Forst-Nord			Am Forsthaus parking area (southbound) / Rhöneiche parking area (northbound)			
Bavaria	Bad Kissingen	Römershager Forst-Nord			94	Bad Brückenau-Volkers	B 286 – Bad Brückenau-Volkers, Jossa, Schlüchtern, Motten	Jossa is only signed southbound Schlüchtern is only signed northbound
Bavaria	Bad Kissingen	Römershager Forst-Nord			Volkersberg parking area (southbound) / Rehhecke parking area (northbound)			
Bavaria	Bad Kissingen	Oberleichtersbach			95	Bad Brückenau/Wildflecken	B 286 – Bad Brückenau, Wildflecken, Bischofsheim, Burkardroth, Jossa	Burkardroth is only signed southbound Jossa is only signed northbound
Bavaria	Bad Kissingen	Schondra			Schildeck parking area (northbound)			
Bavaria	Bad Kissingen	Schondra			Rhön rest area			
Bavaria	Bad Kissingen	Schondra			Veitsbrunn parking area (southbound)			
Bavaria	Bad Kissingen	Schondra			Bornhag parking area (southbound)			
Bavaria	Bad Kissingen	Oberthulba			Brodpfad parking area (southbound) / Seifertsholz parking area (northbound)			
Bavaria	Bad Kissingen	Oberthulba			96	Bad Kissingen/Oberthulba	Bad Kissingen, Oberthulba, Bad Bocklet, Burkardroth	Burkardroth is only signed northbound
Bavaria	Bad Kissingen	Elfershausen			Elfershausen parking area(northbound)			
Bavaria	Bad Kissingen	Elfershausen			97	Hammelburg	B 287 – Hammelburg, Karlstadt, Gemünden, Bad Kissingen, Elfershausen	Karlstadt is only signed southbound Bad Kissingen is only signed northbound
Bavaria	Bad Kissingen	Elfershausen			Heinersberg parking area (northbound)			
Bavaria	Schweinfurt	Wasserlosen			Dollwiese parking area (southbound)			
Bavaria	Schweinfurt	Wasserlosen			Lerchenberg parking area (southbound) / Schwemmelsbach parking area (northbound)			
Bavaria	Schweinfurt	Wasserlosen			98	Wasserlosen	B 303 – Wasserlosen, Euerbach	
Bavaria	Schweinfurt	Wasserlosen			Brebersdorf parking area (northbound)			
Bavaria	Schweinfurt	Werneck			99	Schweinfurt/Werneck interchange	A 70 / E48 – Bamberg, Schweinfurt, Werneck, Erfurt; B 26a – Arnstein	
Bavaria	Schweinfurt	Werneck			Schraudenbachbrücke parking area (southbound)			
Bavaria	Würzburg	Hausen bei Würzburg			Riedener Wald rest area			
Bavaria	Würzburg	Hausen bei Würzburg			Lindig parking area			
Bavaria	Würzburg	Hausen bei Würzburg			100	Gramschatzer Wald	Gramschatz, Karlstadt, Arnstein, Bergtheim	Karlstadt is only signed northbound
Bavaria	Würzburg	Unterpleichfeld			-- parking area (southbound)			
Bavaria	Würzburg	Rimpar			Hirtentannen parking area (northbound)			
Bavaria	Würzburg	Kürnach			101	Würzburg/Estenfeld	B 19 – Würzburg, Estenfeld, Volkach, Rimpar	
Bavaria	Würzburg	Kürnach			Huthstadt parking area (southbound) / Kapellenholz parking area (northbound)			
Bavaria	Würzburg	Estenfeld			Masuren parking area (northbound)			
Bavaria	Kitzingen	Biebelried			102	Biebelried interchange	A 3 / E43 – Frankfurt, Würzburg, Stuttgart; A 3 / E45 – Nürnberg, München	southern endpoint of concurrency with the E45 european road northern endpoint of concurrency with the E43 european road München and Stuttgart are only signed southbound Würzburg is only signed northbound
Bavaria	Kitzingen	Kitzingen			103	Kitzingen	B 8 – Kitzingen, Neustadt an der Aisch, Iphofen, Biebelried	Neustadt an der Aisch and Iphofen are only signed southbound
Bavaria	Kitzingen	Sulzfeld am Main			Wolfsgraben parking area			
Bavaria	Kitzingen	Martinsheim			104	Marktbreit	Marktbreit, Iphofen, Kitzingen-Ost, Ochsenfurt	Iphofen and Kitzingen-Ost are only signed northbound
Bavaria	Kitzingen	Martinsheim			Fuchsloch parking area			
Bavaria	Neustadt an der Aisch-Bad Windsheim	Ippesheim			105	Gollhofen	B 13 – Gollhofen, Uffenheim, Aub, Oberickelsheim	Uffenheim is only signed southbound
Bavaria	Neustadt an der Aisch-Bad Windsheim	Uffenheim			106	Uffenheim/Langensteinach	Uffenheim-Langensteinach, Creglingen, Bad Mergentheim	Creglingen is only signed southbound Bad Mergentheim is only signed northbound
Bavaria	Ansbach	Ohrenbach			Ohrenbach rest area			
Bavaria	Ansbach	Steinsfeld			107	Bad Windsheim	B 470 – Bad Windsheim, Endsee, Steinach an der Ens, Burgbernheim	
Bavaria	Ansbach	Neusitz			108	Rothenburg ob der Tauber	Rothenburg ob der Tauber, Colmberg, Schrozberg, Neusitz	
Bavaria	Ansbach	Neusitz			Kreuzberg parking area			
Bavaria	Ansbach	Wörnitz			109	Wörnitz	Wörnitz, Wettringen, Dombühl, Schillingsfürst	
Bavaria	Ansbach	Wörnitz			Kurzmandl parking area			
Bavaria	Ansbach	Feuchtwangen			110	Feuchtwangen/Crailsheim interchange	A 6 / E50 – München, Mannheim, Heilbronn, Nürnberg, Ansbach, Feuchtwangen-Nord, Crailsheim	München and Crailsheim are only signed southbound Mannheim and Ansbach are only signed northbound
Bavaria	Ansbach	Feuchtwangen			111	Feuchtwangen-West	Feuchtwangen, Crailsheim, Schopfloch, Kreßberg, Schnelldorf	Schopfloch is only signed southbound Schnelldorf is only signed northbound
Bavaria	Ansbach	Dinkelsbühl			Mühlbuck parking area			
Baden-Württemberg	Schwäbisch Hall	Fichtenau			112	Dinkelsbühl/Fichtenau	Dinkelsbühl, Fichtenau, Crailsheim-Süd, Schopfloch	Crailsheim-Süd and Schopfloch are only signed northbound
Baden-Württemberg	Ostalbkreis	Ellwangen (Jagst)			Eilwanger Berge rest area			
Baden-Württemberg	Ostalbkreis	Ellwangen (Jagst)			113	Ellwangen	Ellwangen, Bopfingen, Unterschneidheim	Bopfingen is only signed southbound
Baden-Württemberg	Ostalbkreis	Westhausen			114	Aalen/Westhausen	B 29 – Aalen, Westhausen, Nördlingen, Schwäbisch Gmünd, Bopfingen	Schwäbisch Gmüd is only signed southbound Bopfingen is only signed northbound
Baden-Württemberg	Ostalbkreis	Aalen			115	Aalen/Oberkochen	B 29a – Aalen-Süd, Oberkochen, Schwäbisch Gmünd, Königsbronn, Neresheim	Königsbronn and Neresheim are only signed southbound Schwäbisch Gmüd is only signed northbound
Baden-Württemberg	Heidenheim	Heidenheim an der Brenz			Härtsfeld parking area			
Baden-Württemberg	Heidenheim	Nattheim			116	Heidenheim	B 466a – Heidenheim, Steinheim, Dischingen, Königsbronn, Neresheim, Nattheim	Steinheim and Dischingen are only signed southbound Königsbronn and Neresheim are only signed northbound
Baden-Württemberg	Heidenheim	Giengen an der Brenz			117	Giengen/Herbrechtingen	B 19 – Herbrechtingen, Heidenheim; B 462 – Giengen, Sontheim/Brenz, Dillingen	Sontheim/Brenz is only signed southbound Heidenheim only signed northbound
Baden-Württemberg	Heidenheim	Giengen an der Brenz			Lonetal rest area			
Baden-Württemberg	Heidenheim	Herbrechtingen			118	Niederstotzingen	Niederstotzingen, Sontheim (Brenz), Herbrechtingen-Bissingen, Gerstetten	Sontheim (Brenz) is only signed northbound
Baden-Württemberg	Alb-Donau-Kreis	Langenau			Vor dem Donauried parking area (southbound) / Sankt Jakob parking area (northbound)			
Baden-Württemberg	Alb-Donau-Kreis	Langenau			119	Langenau	Langenau, Bernstadt	
Bavaria	Neu-Ulm	Elchingen			120	Ulm/Elchingen interchange	A 8 / E52 – München, Augsburg, Stuttgart, Ulm	
Bavaria	Neu-Ulm	Nersingen			Leibisee parking area			
Bavaria	Neu-Ulm	Neu-Ulm			121	Nersingen	B 10 – Nersingen, Neu-Ulm, Pfuhl, Burlafingen	
Bavaria	Neu-Ulm	Neu-Ulm			Hahnenberg parking area			
Bavaria	Neu-Ulm	Neu-Ulm			Buchwald parking area			
Bavaria	Neu-Ulm	Senden			122	Hittisetten interchange	B 28 – Ulm, Neu-Ulm, Senden, Friedrichshafen	Friedrichshafen is only signed southbound Neu-Ulm is only signed northbound
Bavaria	Neu-Ulm	Senden			Buchenberg parking area (southbound)			
Bavaria	Neu-Ulm	Vöhringen			Winterhalde parking area (northbound)			
Bavaria	Neu-Ulm	Vöhringen			123	Vöhringen	Vöhringen, Weißenhorn, Bellenberg	
Bavaria	Neu-Ulm	Illertissen			Reutelsberger Forst parking area			
Bavaria	Neu-Ulm	Illertissen			Tannengarten parking area			
Bavaria	Neu-Ulm	Illertissen			124	Illertissen	Illertissen, Dietenheim, Krumbach (Schwaben), Babenhausen	
Bavaria	Neu-Ulm	Altenstadt			Badhauser Wald parking area			
Bavaria	Neu-Ulm	Altenstadt			125	Altenstadt	Altenstadt, Kellmünz an der Iller	
Baden-Württemberg	Biberach	Dettingen an der Iller			Illertal rest area			
Baden-Württemberg	Biberach	Dettingen an der Iller			126	Dettingen an der Iller	Dettingen an der Iller, Ochsenhausen, Kirchberg an der Iller, Erolzheim, Kirchdorf an der Iller	Ochsenhausen and Kirchdorf an der Iller are only signed southbound Kirchberg an der Iller is only signed northbound
Bavaria	Unterallgäu	Fellheim			Brühl parking area			
Bavaria	Unterallgäu	Heimertingen			127	Berkheim	B 300 – Heimertingen; B 312 – Berkheim, Biberach an der Riß, Tannheim, Kirchdorf an der Iller	Tannheim is only signed southbound Kirchdorf an der Iller is only signed northbound
Bavaria	Unterallgäu	Buxheim			Aumühle parking area			
Bavaria	Unterallgäu	Buxheim			128	Memmingen interchange	A 96 / E43 / E54 – Bregenz, Lindau; A 96 / E54 – München, Memmingen-Nord	southern endpoint of concurrency with the E43 european road northern endpoint of concurrency with the E532 european road
Bavaria	Memmingen				Buxachtal parking area			
Bavaria	Memmingen				129	Memmingen-Süd	Memmingen-Süd, Ottobeuren	Ottobeuren is only signed southbound
Bavaria	Unterallgäu	Woringen			Königsrain parking area (southbound)			
Bavaria	Unterallgäu	Woringen			130	Woringen	Woringen	
Bavaria	Unterallgäu	Wolfertschwenden			Darastfeld parking area (southbound)			
Bavaria	Unterallgäu	Bad Grönenbach			131	Bad Grönenbach	Bad Grönenbach, Wolfertschwenden, Ottobeuren	Ottobeuren is only signed northbound
Bavaria	Oberallgäu	Dietmannsried			Allgäuer Tor rest area			
Bavaria	Oberallgäu	Dietmannsried			132	Dietmannsried	Dietmannsried, Altusried, Obergünzburg, Probstried	Obergünzburg is only signed southbound
Bavaria	Oberallgäu	Dietmannsried			Seebach parking area (southbound)			
Bavaria	Kempten (Allgäu)				Leubastal parking area			
Bavaria	Kempten (Allgäu)				133	Kempten-Leubas	B 19 – Kempten-Leubas, Obergünzburg, Lauben	Obergünzburg and Lauben are only signed northbound
Bavaria	Kempten (Allgäu)				134	Kempten	B 12 – Kempten, München, Augsburg, Kaufbeuren, Marktoberdorf	Kaufbeuren and Marktoberdorf are only signed southbound München and Augsburg are only signed northbound
Bavaria	Kempten (Allgäu)				135	Betzigau	Betzigau	
Bavaria	Oberallgäu	Durach			Vorwald parking area			
Bavaria	Oberallgäu	Sulzberg			136	Allgäu interchange	A 980 – Lindau, Oberstdorf, Sonthofen	
Bavaria	Oberallgäu	Oy-Mittelberg			Rottachtal parking area			
Bavaria	Oberallgäu	Oy-Mittelberg			137	Oy-Mittelberg	B 310 – Oy-Mittelberg, Bad Hindelang-Oberjoch, Wertach, Pfronten	Pfronten is only signed southbound
Bavaria	Ostallgäu	Nesselwang			138	Nesselwang	Nesselwang, Marktoberdorf, Roßhaupten, Seeg, Rückholz	Roßhaupten is only signed southbound Marktoberdorf is only signed northbound
Bavaria	Ostallgäu	Füssen			139	Füssen	B 310 – Füssen, Schwangau, Kaufbeuren, Pfronten, Rieden am Forggensee, Hopferau	Schwangau and Hopferau are only signed southbound Kaufbeuren and Pfronten are only signed southbound road narrows down from 4 to 2 lanes
Bavaria	Ostallgäu	Füssen			—	Grenztunnel Füssen	B 179 / E532 – Innsbruck, Reutte	southern endpoint of motorway southern endpoint of concurrency with the E532 european road
1.000 mi = 1.609 km; 1.000 km = 0.621 mi: Concurrency terminus; Incomplete access; Proposed; Route transition
