= European route E532 =

Road in trans-European E-road network

E532

Route information
- Length: 144 km (89 mi)

Major junctions
- From: Memmingen (Germany)
- To: Telfs (Austria)

Location
- Countries: Germany; Austria

Highway system
- International E-road network; A Class; B Class

E 532 is a European B class road in connecting the cities Memmingen, Germany – Telfs, Austria.

== Route and E-road junctions ==
- Germany (on shared signage A 7)
  - Memmingen: E43, E54
  - Füssen (near Austrian border)
- Austria (on shared signage B 179 then B 189)
  - Reutte (near German border)
  - Telfs: E60
