= Oy-Mittelberg =

- Municipality
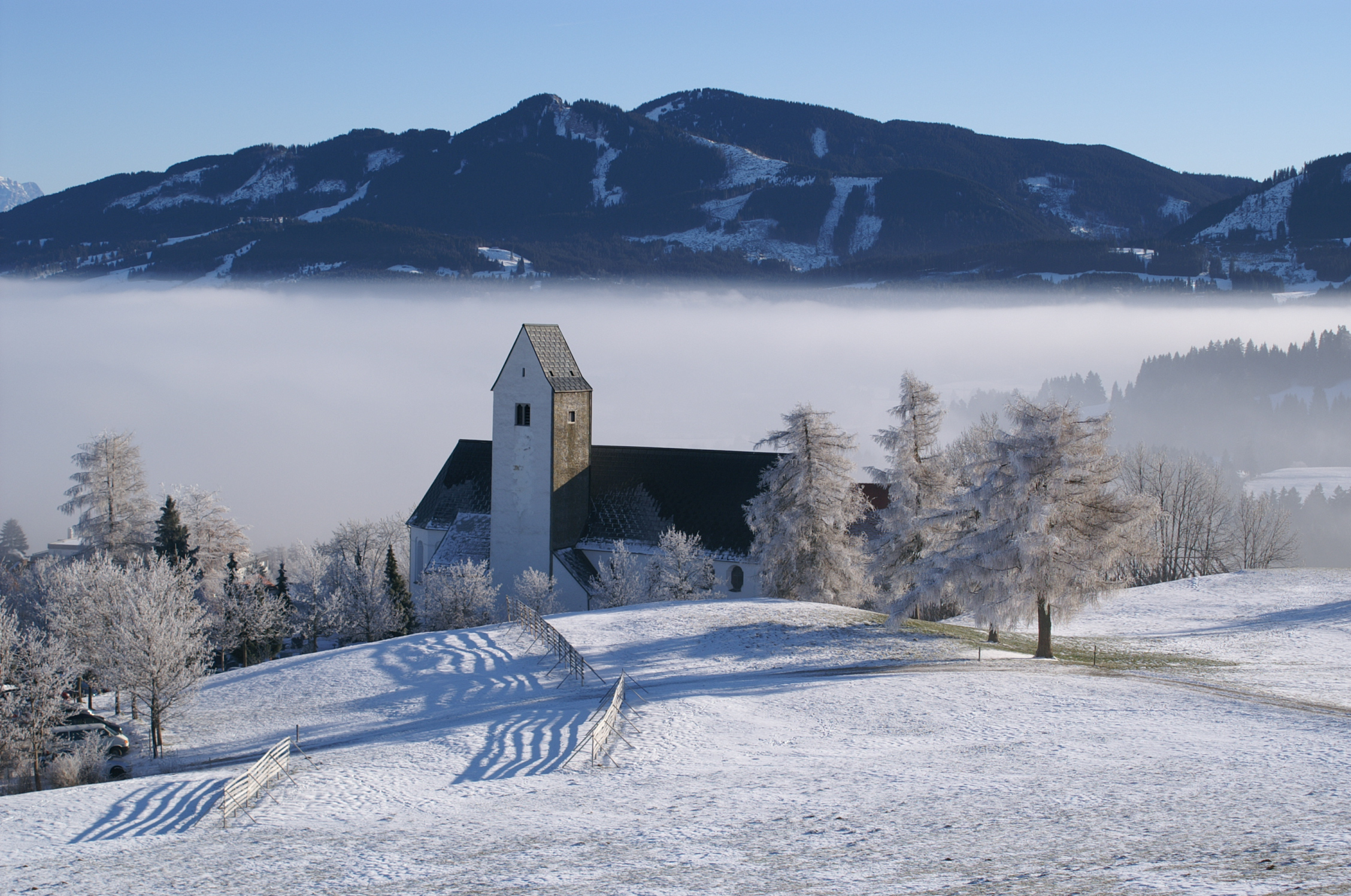
- Church in Mittelberg

- Coat of arms

- Location of Oy-Mittelberg within Oberallgäu district
- Interactive map of Oy-Mittelberg
- Location within Germany Location within Bavaria
- Coordinates: 47°38′N 10°26′E
- Country: Germany
- State: Bavaria
- Admin. region: Schwaben
- District: Oberallgäu

Government
  - Mayor (2017–23): Theo Haslach (CSU)

Area
  - Total: 60.17 km^{2} (23.23 sq mi)
- Elevation: 929 m (3,048 ft)

Population (2025-12-31)
  - Total: 4,532
  - Density: 75.32/km^{2} (195.1/sq mi)
- Time zone: UTC+01:00 (CET)
  - Summer (DST): UTC+02:00 (CEST)
- Postal codes: 87466
- Dialling codes: 08366
- Vehicle registration: OA
- Website: www.oy-mittelberg.de

Oy-Mittelberg (German pronunciation: [ˈɔʏ ˈmɪtl̩bɛʁk]) is a municipality in the rural district Oberallgäu in Bavaria, Germany.

== Geography ==
Oy-Mittelberg is situated in the Allgäu region in the foothills of the Allgäu Alps. The municipality consists of the villages of Burgkranzegg, Faistenoy, Haslach, Kressen, Maria-Rain, Mittelberg, Oberschwarzenberg, Oberzollhaus, Oy, Petersthal and Riedis. In addition to that there are several small hamlets.
