= Künzell =

- Municipality
- Coat of arms

- Location of Künzell within Fulda district
- Interactive map of Künzell
- Location within Germany Location within Hesse
- Coordinates: 50°33′N 9°43′E
- Country: Germany
- State: Hesse
- Admin. region: Kassel
- District: Fulda
- Subdivisions: 9 districts

Government
  - Mayor (2021–27): Timo Zentgraf (Ind.)

Area
  - Total: 30.29 km^{2} (11.70 sq mi)
- Elevation: 336 m (1,102 ft)

Population (2025-12-31)
  - Total: 16,826
  - Density: 555.5/km^{2} (1,439/sq mi)
- Time zone: UTC+01:00 (CET)
  - Summer (DST): UTC+02:00 (CEST)
- Postal codes: 36093
- Dialling codes: 0661
- Vehicle registration: FD
- Website: www.kuenzell.de

Künzell is a municipality in the district of Fulda, in Hesse, Germany. It is situated 3 km east of Fulda. It is twinned with the English village of Rustington.

The subdivisions are: Künzell/Bachrain, Pilgerzell, Engelhelms, Dirlos (with Loheland), Dietershausen, Keulos, Wissels and Dassen.

== History ==
In 743 a monk named Chindolf settled there in a cella. The place was named Chindecella or Kindecella.
