= Warder, Germany =

Warder
- Municipality
- Coat of arms

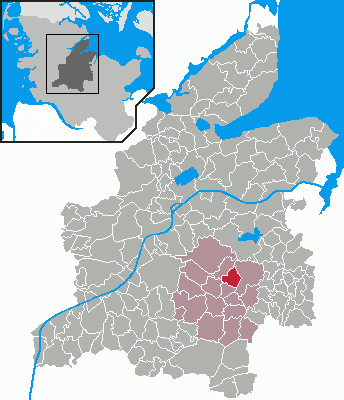
- Location of Warder within Rendsburg-Eckernförde district
- Interactive map of Warder
- Location within Germany Location within Schleswig-Holstein
- Coordinates: 54°13′N 9°53′E
- Country: Germany
- State: Schleswig-Holstein
- District: Rendsburg-Eckernförde
- Municipal assoc.: Nortorfer Land

Government
  - Mayor: Jürgen Lucht

Area
  - Total: 8.71 km^{2} (3.36 sq mi)
- Elevation: 28 m (92 ft)

Population (2025-12-31)
  - Total: 699
  - Density: 80.3/km^{2} (208/sq mi)
- Time zone: UTC+01:00 (CET)
  - Summer (DST): UTC+02:00 (CEST)
- Postal codes: 24646
- Dialling codes: 04329
- Vehicle registration: RD
- Website: www.amt-nortorfer- land.de

Warder is a municipality in the district of Rendsburg-Eckernförde, in Schleswig-Holstein, Germany.
