= Dietmannsried =

- Municipality
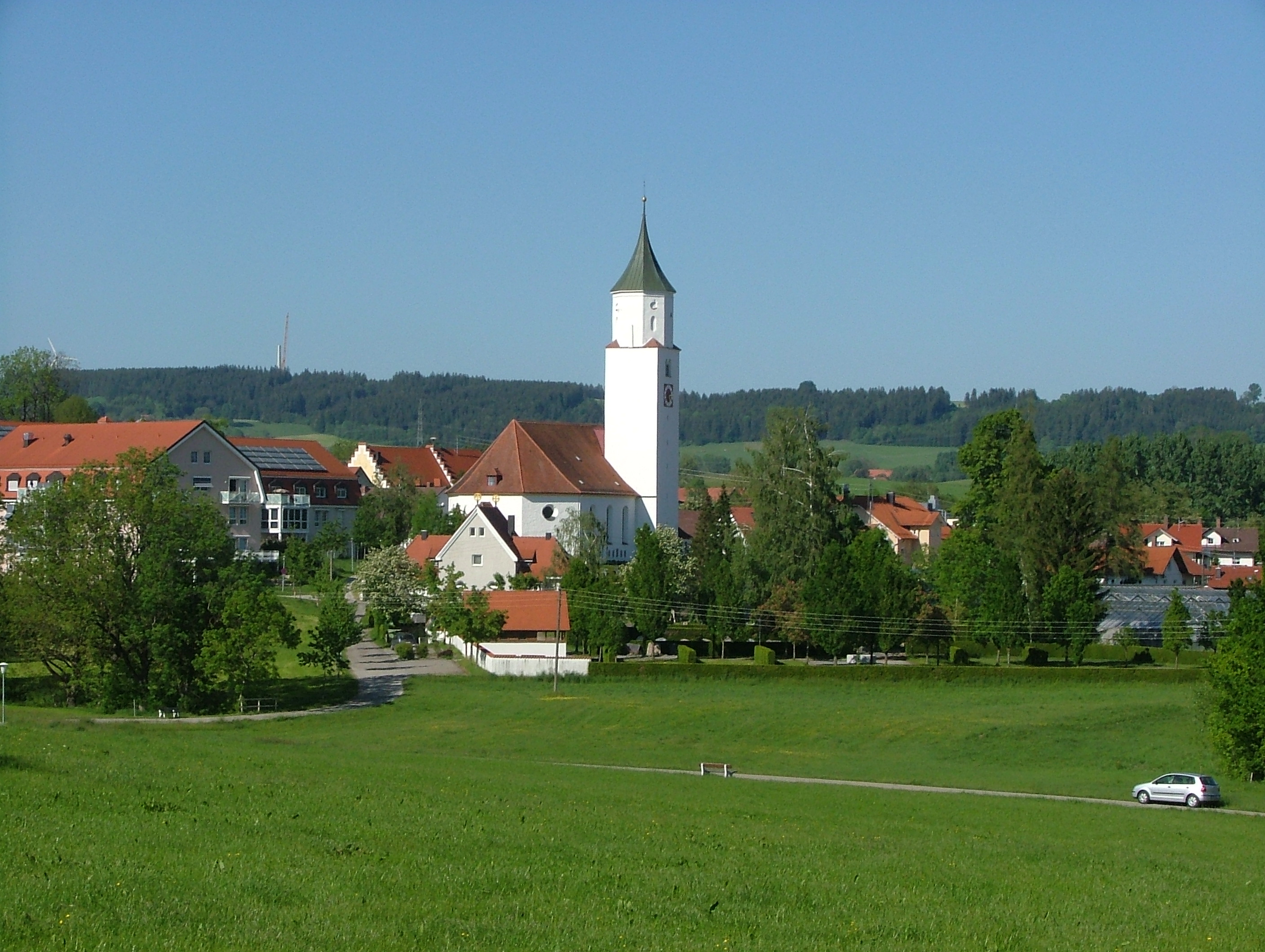
- Dietmannsried

- Coat of arms

- Location of Dietmannsried within Oberallgäu district
- Interactive map of Dietmannsried
- Location within Germany Location within Bavaria
- Coordinates: 47°49′N 10°17′E
- Country: Germany
- State: Bavaria
- Admin. region: Schwaben
- District: Oberallgäu

Government
  - Mayor (2020–26): Werner Endres

Area
  - Total: 53.68 km^{2} (20.73 sq mi)
- Elevation: 682 m (2,238 ft)

Population (2025-12-31)
  - Total: 8,492
  - Density: 158.2/km^{2} (409.7/sq mi)
- Time zone: UTC+01:00 (CET)
  - Summer (DST): UTC+02:00 (CEST)
- Postal codes: 87463
- Dialling codes: 08374
- Vehicle registration: OA
- Website: www.dietmannsried.de

Dietmannsried (German pronunciation: [ˈdiːtmansʁiːt]) is a municipality in the district of Oberallgäu in Bavaria in Germany.

== Sister cities ==
- Carry-le-Rouet, Bouches-du-Rhône, France
