= Gollhofen =

- Municipality
- Coat of arms

- Location of Gollhofen within Neustadt a.d.Aisch-Bad Windsheim district
- Interactive map of Gollhofen
- Location within Germany Location within Bavaria
- Coordinates: 49°34′N 10°11′E
- Country: Germany
- State: Bavaria
- Admin. region: Mittelfranken
- District: Neustadt a.d.Aisch-Bad Windsheim
- Municipal assoc.: Uffenheim
- Subdivisions: 2 Ortsteile

Government
  - Mayor (2020–26): Heinrich Klein

Area
  - Total: 17.03 km^{2} (6.58 sq mi)
- Elevation: 320 m (1,050 ft)

Population (2025-12-31)
  - Total: 890
  - Density: 52/km^{2} (140/sq mi)
- Time zone: UTC+01:00 (CET)
  - Summer (DST): UTC+02:00 (CEST)
- Postal codes: 97258
- Dialling codes: 09339
- Vehicle registration: NEA
- Website: www.gollhofen.de

Gollhofen is a municipality in the district of Neustadt (Aisch)-Bad Windsheim in Bavaria in Germany.

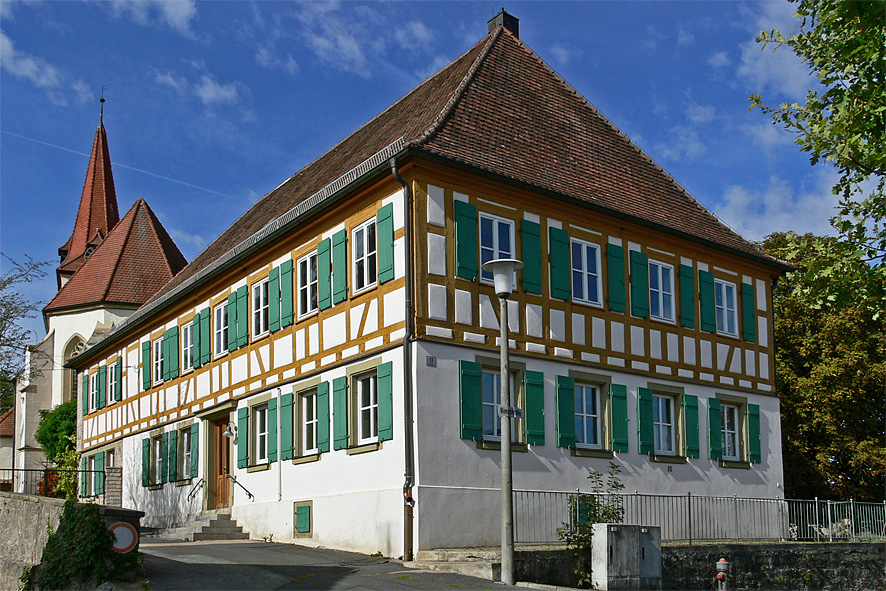
Former school house
