= Woringen =

- Municipality
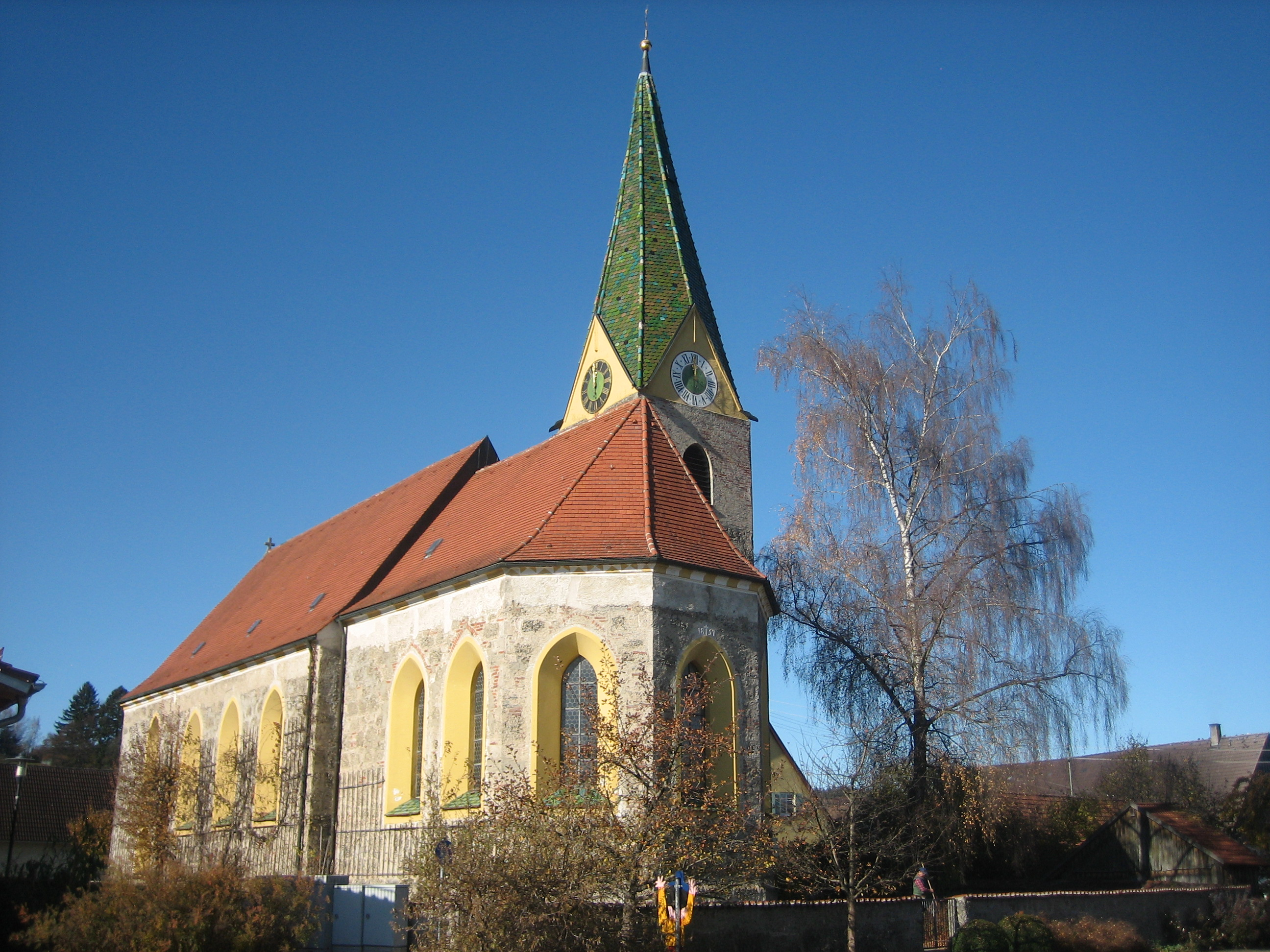
- Lutheran church of Our Lady

- Coat of arms

- Location of Woringen within Unterallgäu district
- Interactive map of Woringen
- Location within Germany Location within Bavaria
- Coordinates: 47°55′N 10°12′E
- Country: Germany
- State: Bavaria
- Admin. region: Schwaben
- District: Unterallgäu
- Municipal assoc.: Bad Grönenbach

Government
  - Mayor (2020–26): Jochen Lutz

Area
  - Total: 17.54 km^{2} (6.77 sq mi)
- Elevation: 632 m (2,073 ft)

Population (2025-12-31)
  - Total: 2,101
  - Density: 119.8/km^{2} (310.2/sq mi)
- Time zone: UTC+01:00 (CET)
  - Summer (DST): UTC+02:00 (CEST)
- Postal codes: 87789
- Dialling codes: 08331
- Vehicle registration: MN
- Website: www.woringen.de

Woringen is a municipality in the district of Unterallgäu in Bavaria, Germany.
