= Sinstorf =

Quarter in Hamburg, Germany

- Quarter of Hamburg
- Location of Sinstorf within Hamburg
- Interactive map of Sinstorf
- Location within Germany Location within Hamburg
- Coordinates: 53°25′26″N 9°58′50″E
- Country: Germany
- State: Hamburg
- City: Hamburg
- Borough: Harburg

Population (2024-12-31)
  - Total: 4,329
- Time zone: UTC+01:00 (CET)
  - Summer (DST): UTC+02:00 (CEST)

Sinstorf (German pronunciation: [ˈzɪnsˌtɔʁf]) is a quarter of Hamburg, Germany in the Harburg borough.

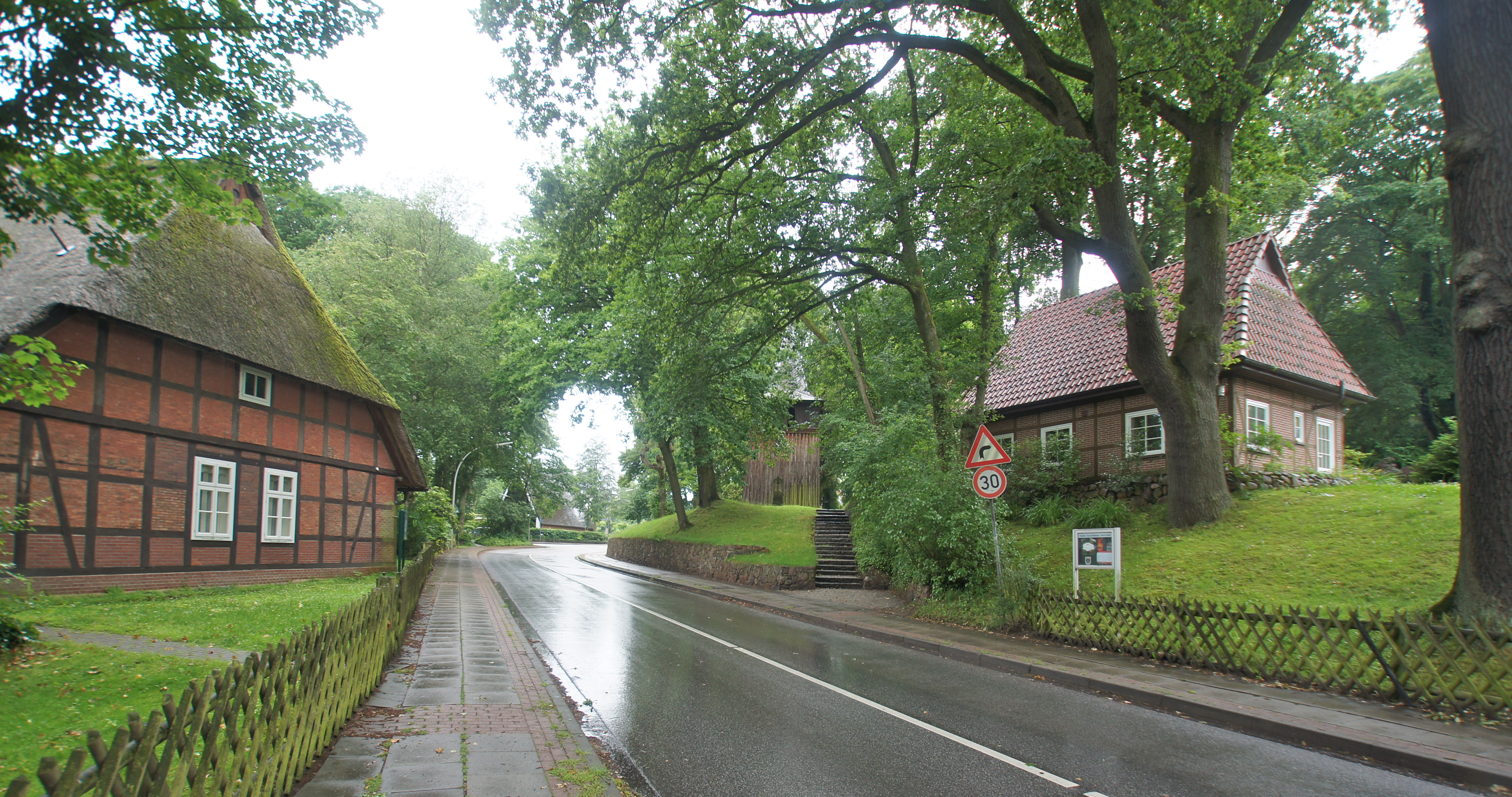
Sinstoerp - doerpssicht
