= Berkheim =

- Municipality
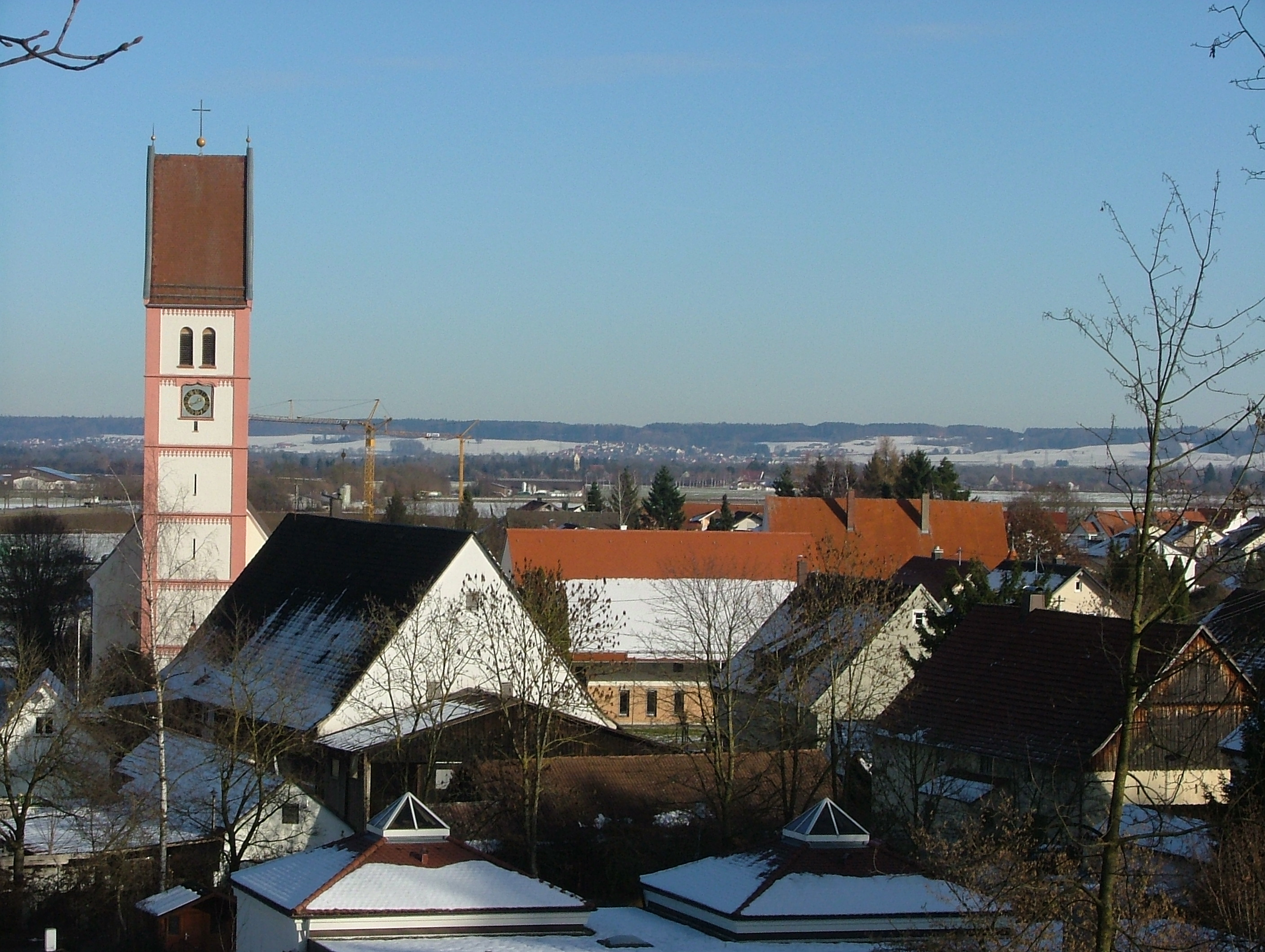
- Skyline

- Coat of arms

- Location of Berkheim within Biberach district
- Interactive map of Berkheim
- Location within Germany Location within Baden-Württemberg
- Coordinates: 48°2′30″N 10°4′59″E
- Country: Germany
- State: Baden-Württemberg
- Admin. region: Tübingen
- District: Biberach

Government
  - Mayor (2019–27): Walter Puza

Area
  - Total: 25.02 km^{2} (9.66 sq mi)
- Elevation: 569 m (1,867 ft)

Population (2025-12-31)
  - Total: 3,295
  - Density: 131.7/km^{2} (341.1/sq mi)
- Time zone: UTC+01:00 (CET)
  - Summer (DST): UTC+02:00 (CEST)
- Postal codes: 88450
- Dialling codes: 07354, 08395
- Vehicle registration: BC
- Website: www.gemeinde-berkheim.de

Berkheim (German pronunciation: [ˈbɛʁkhaɪm]) is a municipality in the district of Biberach in Baden-Württemberg in Germany.

== Mayors ==
In April 2011 Walter Puza was elected mayor with 91.46% of the votes, succeeding Michael Sailer. Puza was re-elected in 2019.
