= Betzigau =

- Municipality
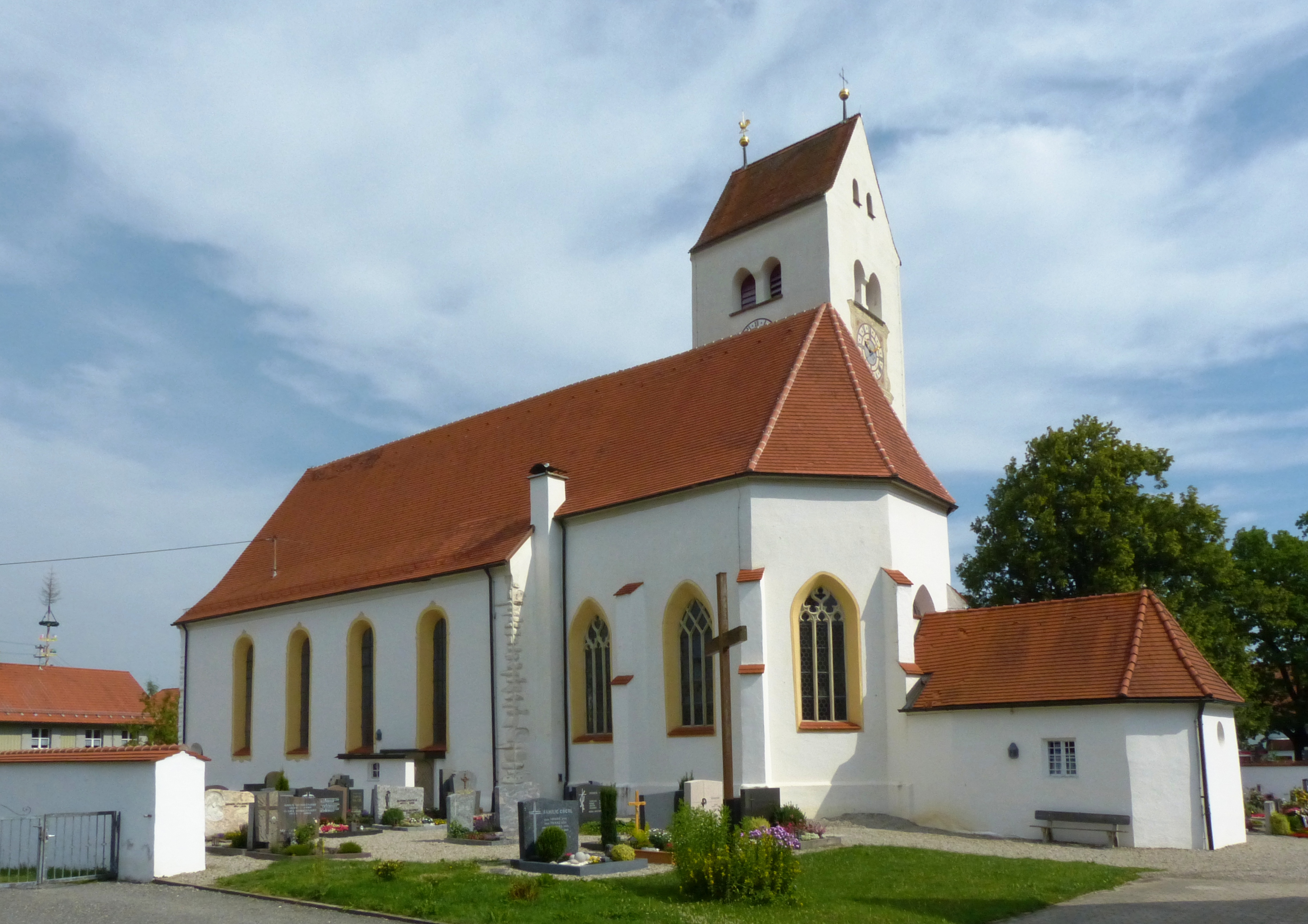
- Saint Afra Church

- Coat of arms

- Location of Betzigau within Oberallgäu district
- Interactive map of Betzigau
- Location within Germany Location within Bavaria
- Coordinates: 47°44′N 10°23′E
- Country: Germany
- State: Bavaria
- Admin. region: Schwaben
- District: Oberallgäu

Government
  - Mayor (2020–26): Roland Helfrich

Area
  - Total: 29.27 km^{2} (11.30 sq mi)
- Elevation: 728 m (2,388 ft)

Population (2025-12-31)
  - Total: 2,880
  - Density: 98.4/km^{2} (255/sq mi)
- Time zone: UTC+01:00 (CET)
  - Summer (DST): UTC+02:00 (CEST)
- Postal codes: 87488
- Dialling codes: 0831
- Vehicle registration: OA
- Website: www.betzigau.de

Betzigau (German pronunciation: [ˈbɛtsiɡaʊ]) is a municipality in the district of Oberallgäu in Bavaria in Germany. The altitude of the village ranges from 709 m above sea level to 946 m. Betzigau is on the Buchloe–Lindau railway line.

== Population Development ==
From 1988 to 2008 Betzigau grew by 440 residents, or 19%. Between 1988 and 2018 the village grew from 2320 to 2926 so 606 residents, or 26,1 %.

The following figures refer to the territorial status of May 25, 1987.

Population Development
Year	1840	1900	1939	1950	1961	1970	1987	1991	1995	2000	2005	2010	2015
Residents	1092	1265	1319	1747	1648	1803	2280	2499	2637	2775	2830	2747	2845

== Politic ==
Roland Helfrich is the mayor of Betzigau.

The municipal tax revenue in 2017 was €2,841,000. Of that, €606,000 were revenue from trade tax.

== Ground Monuments ==
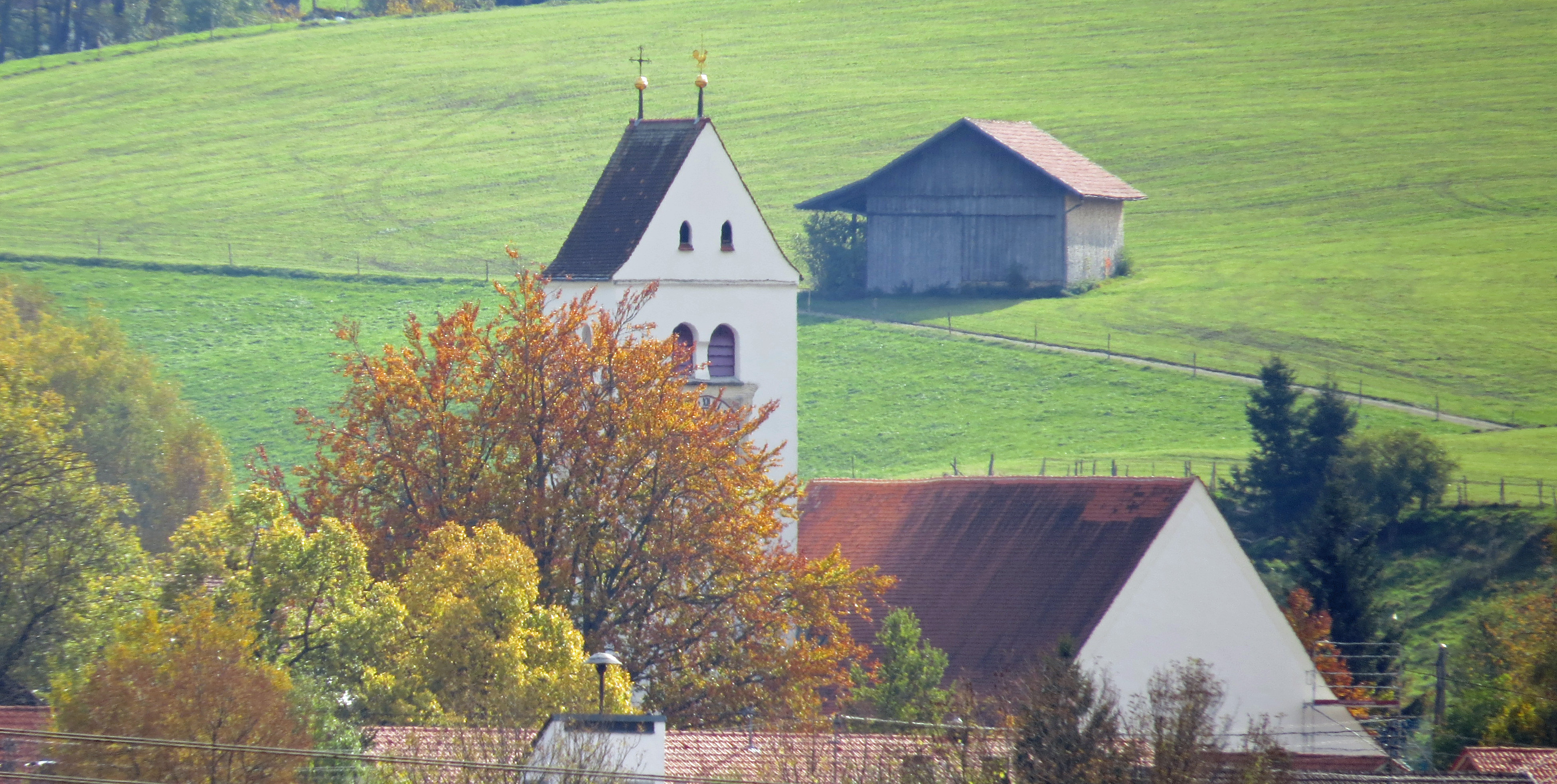
Betzigau

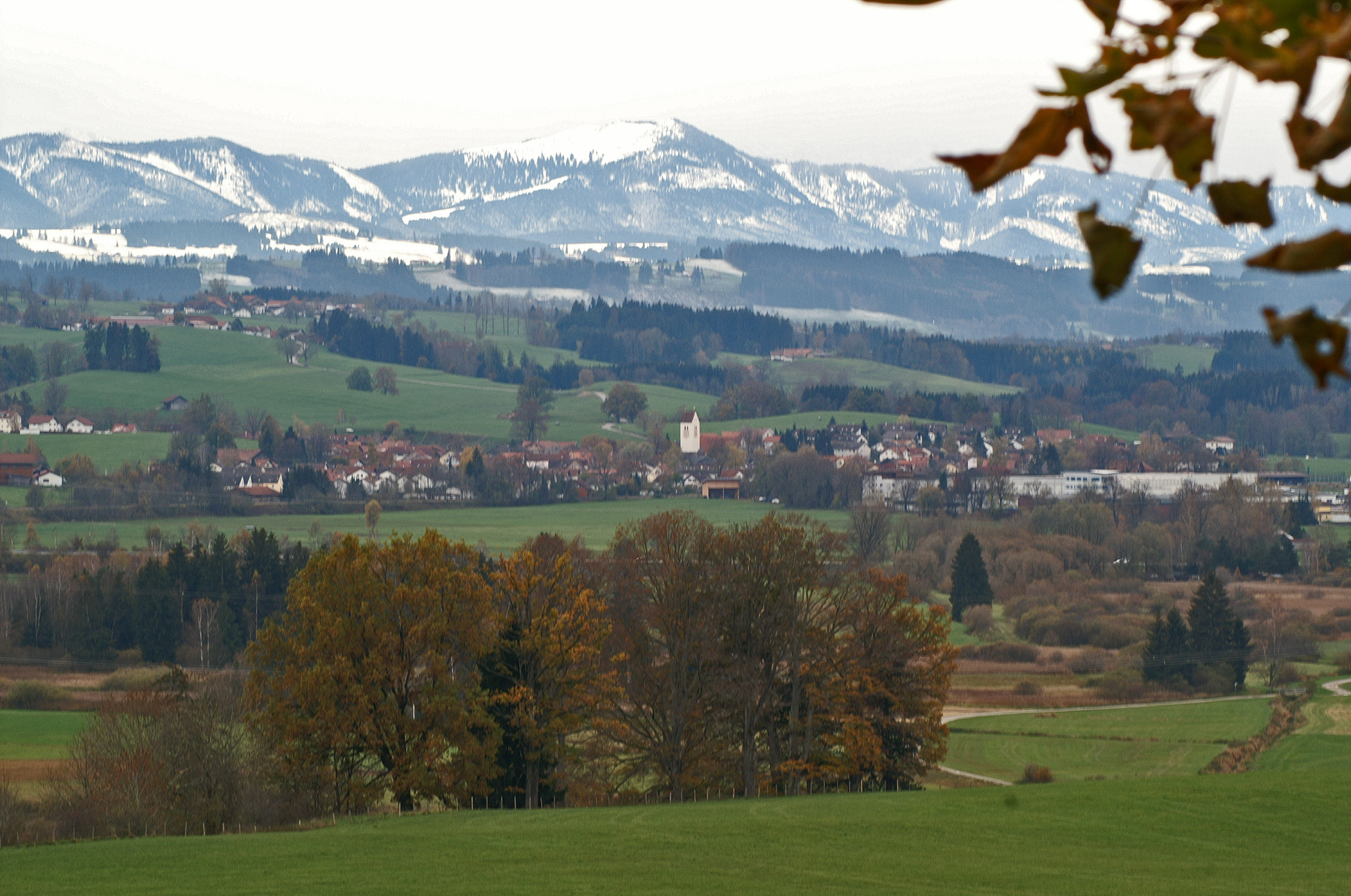
Betzigau from the northwest

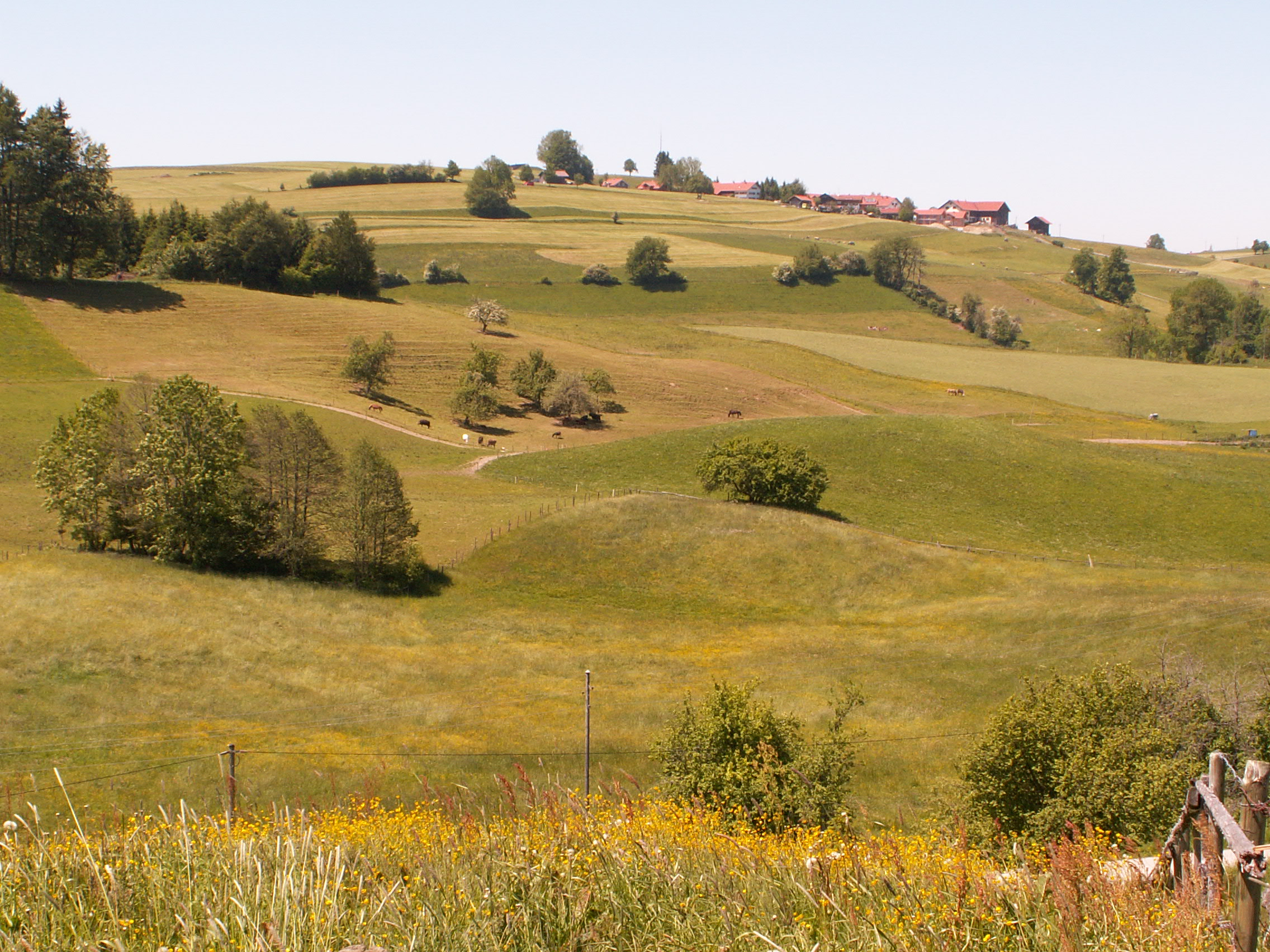
Hauptmannsgreut

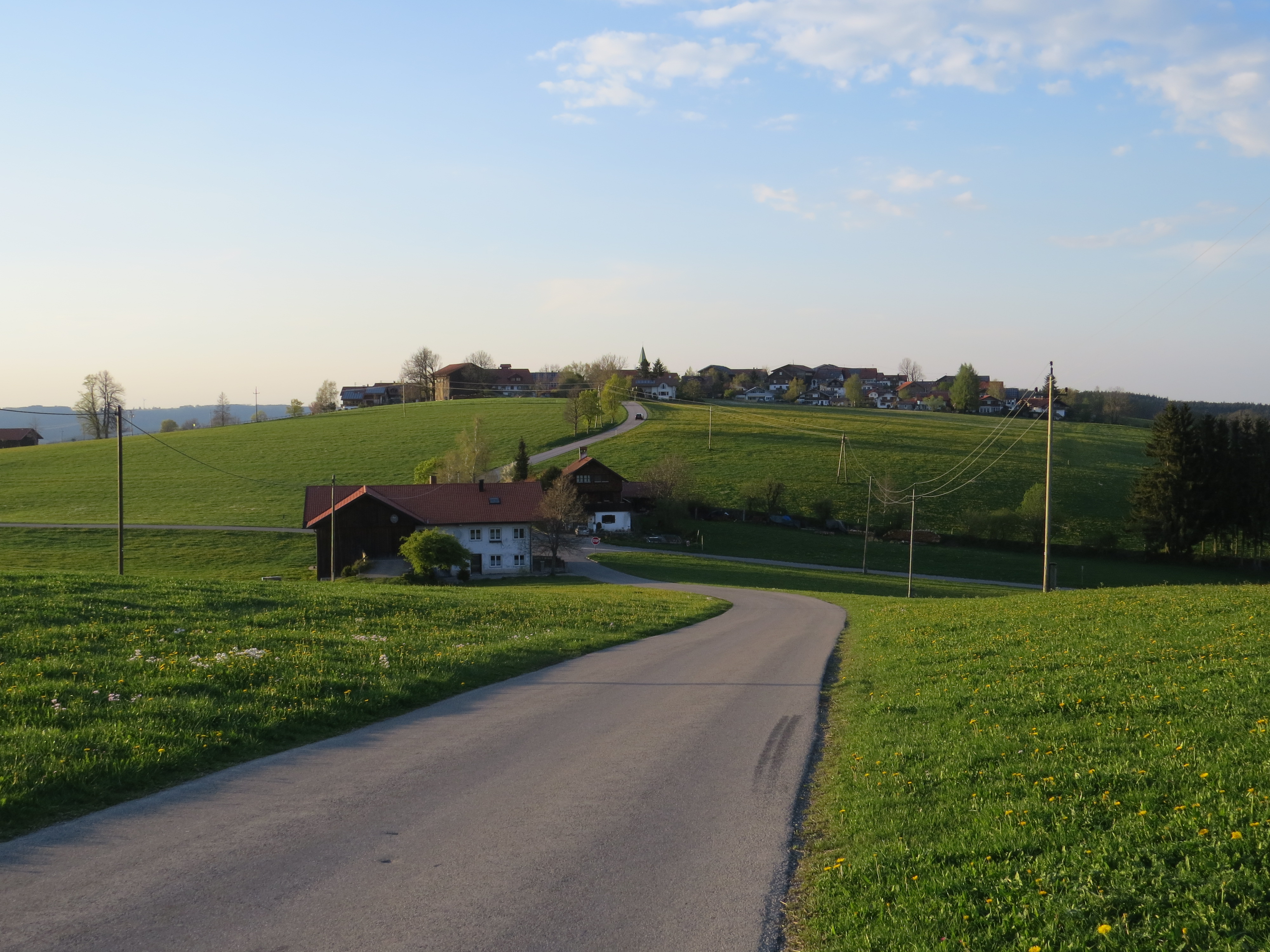
Hochgreut (920 m)

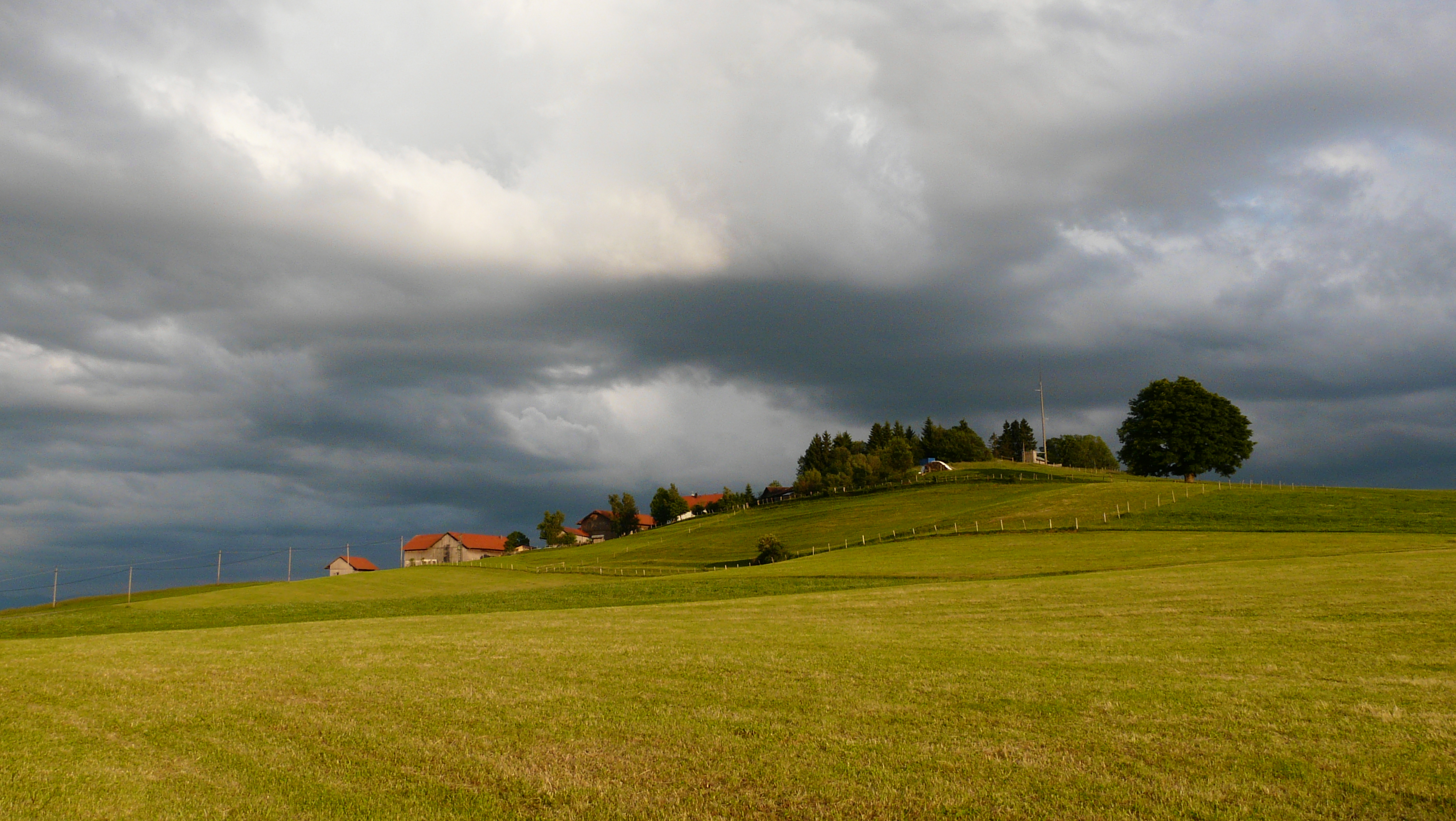
High shoulder (941 m)

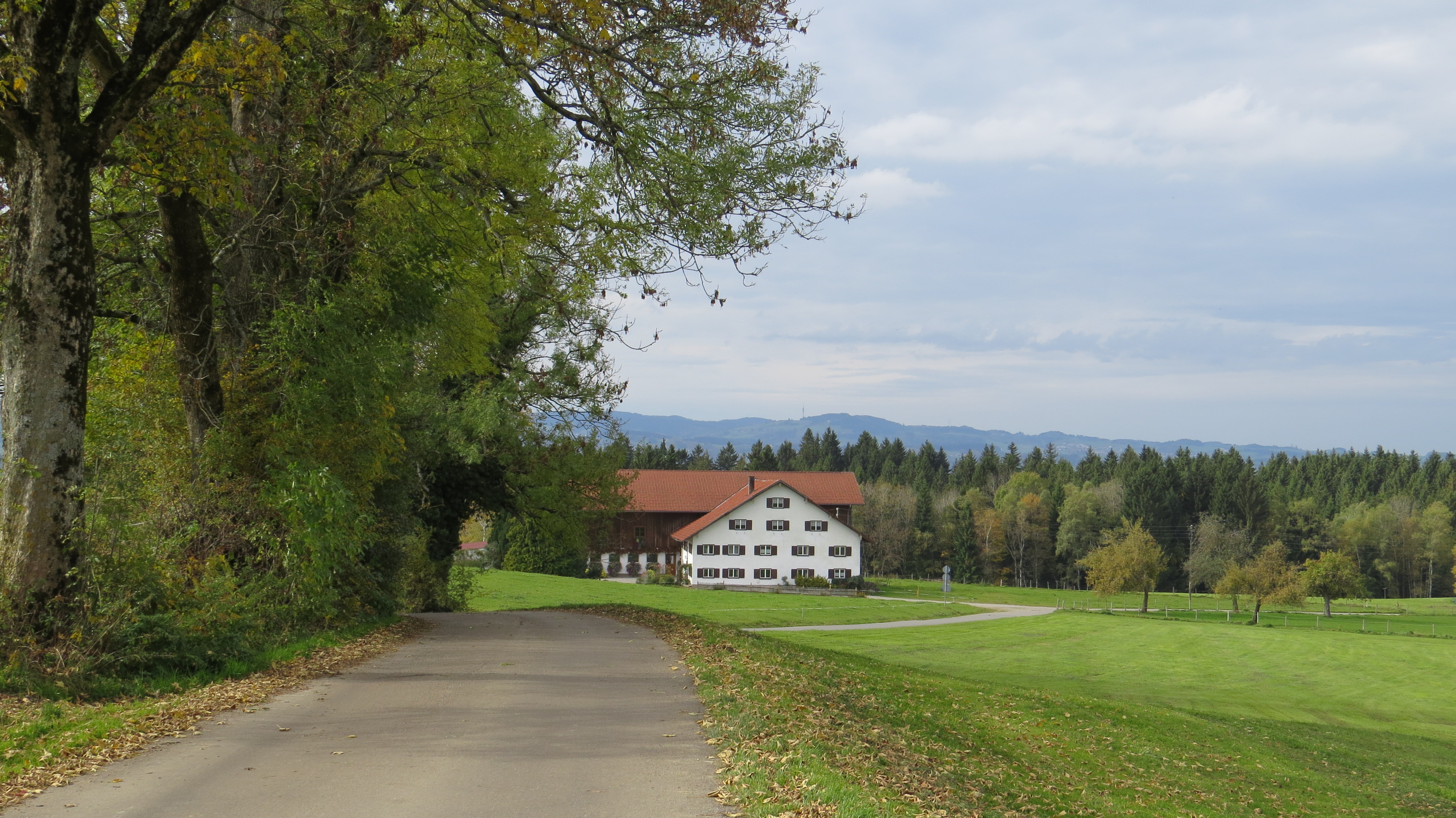
Kaisersmad

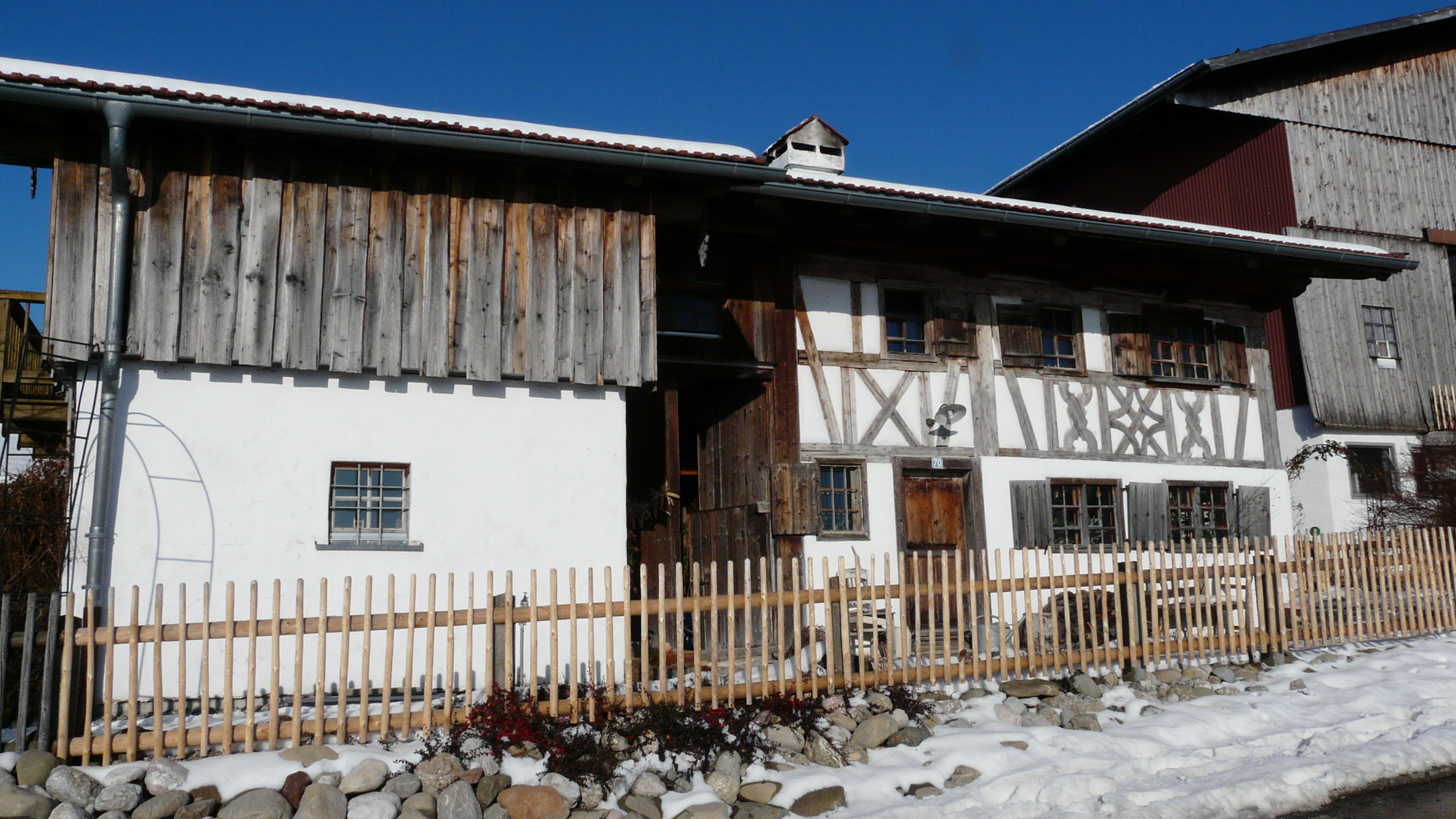
Leiterberg 70

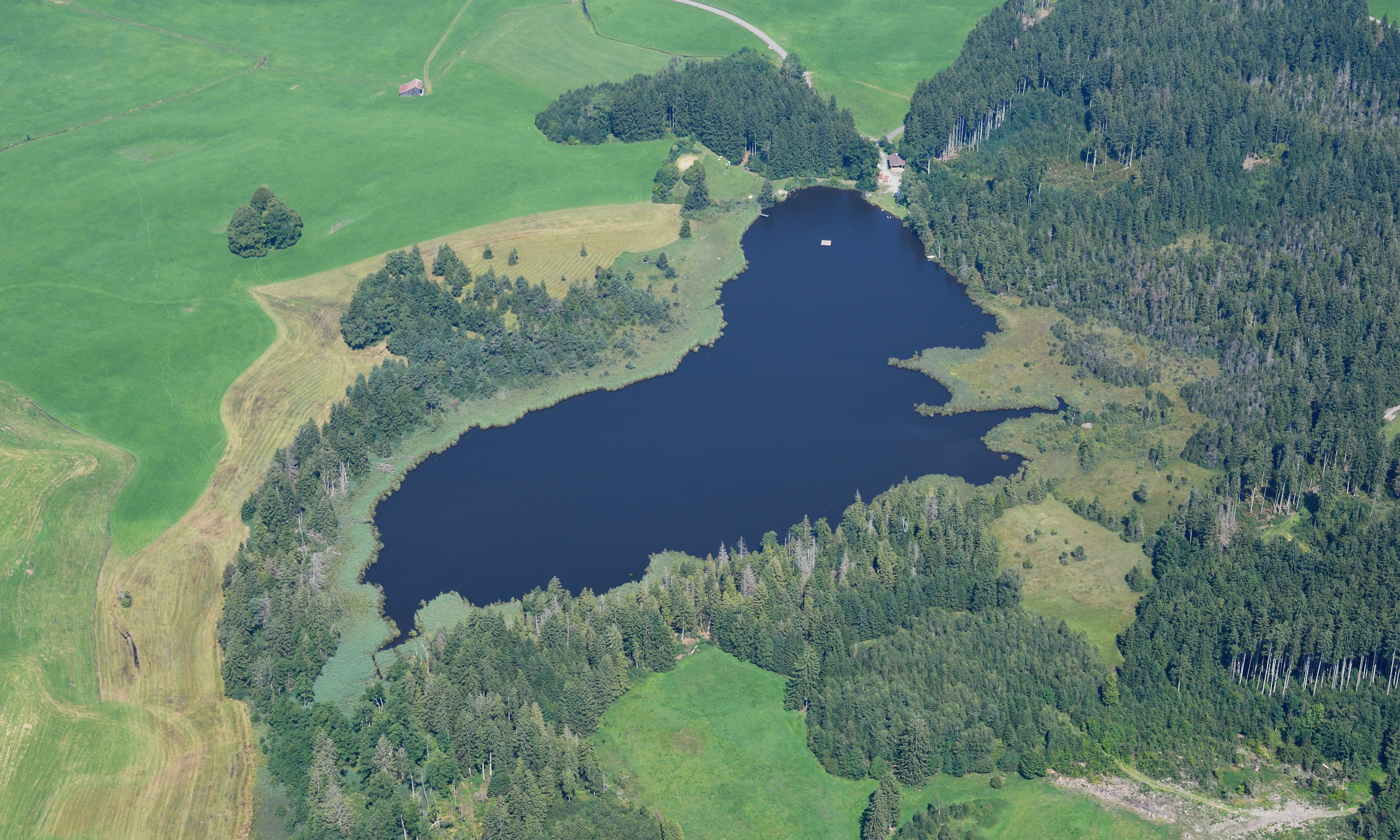
Notzenweiher

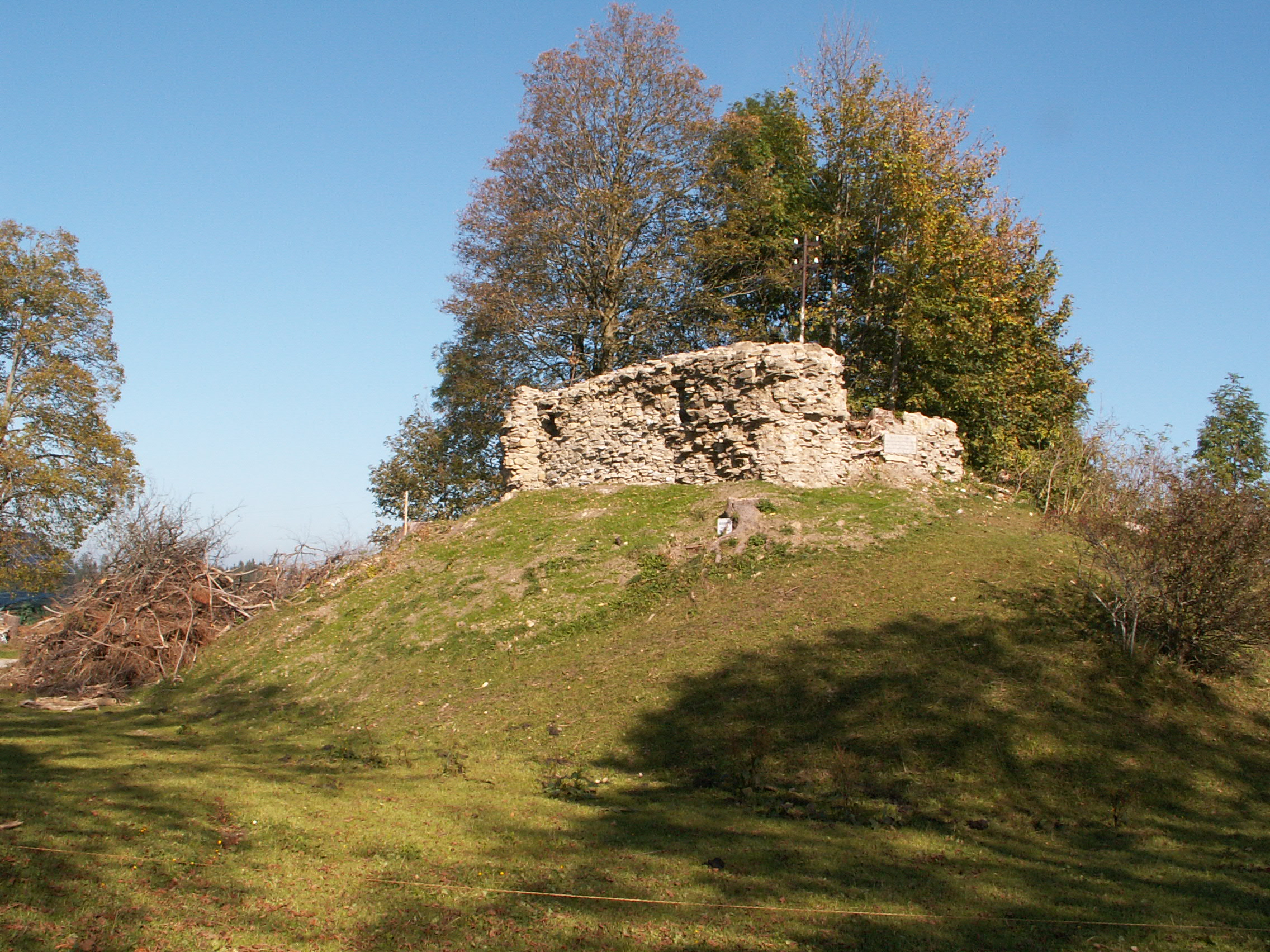
Ruine Schönberg

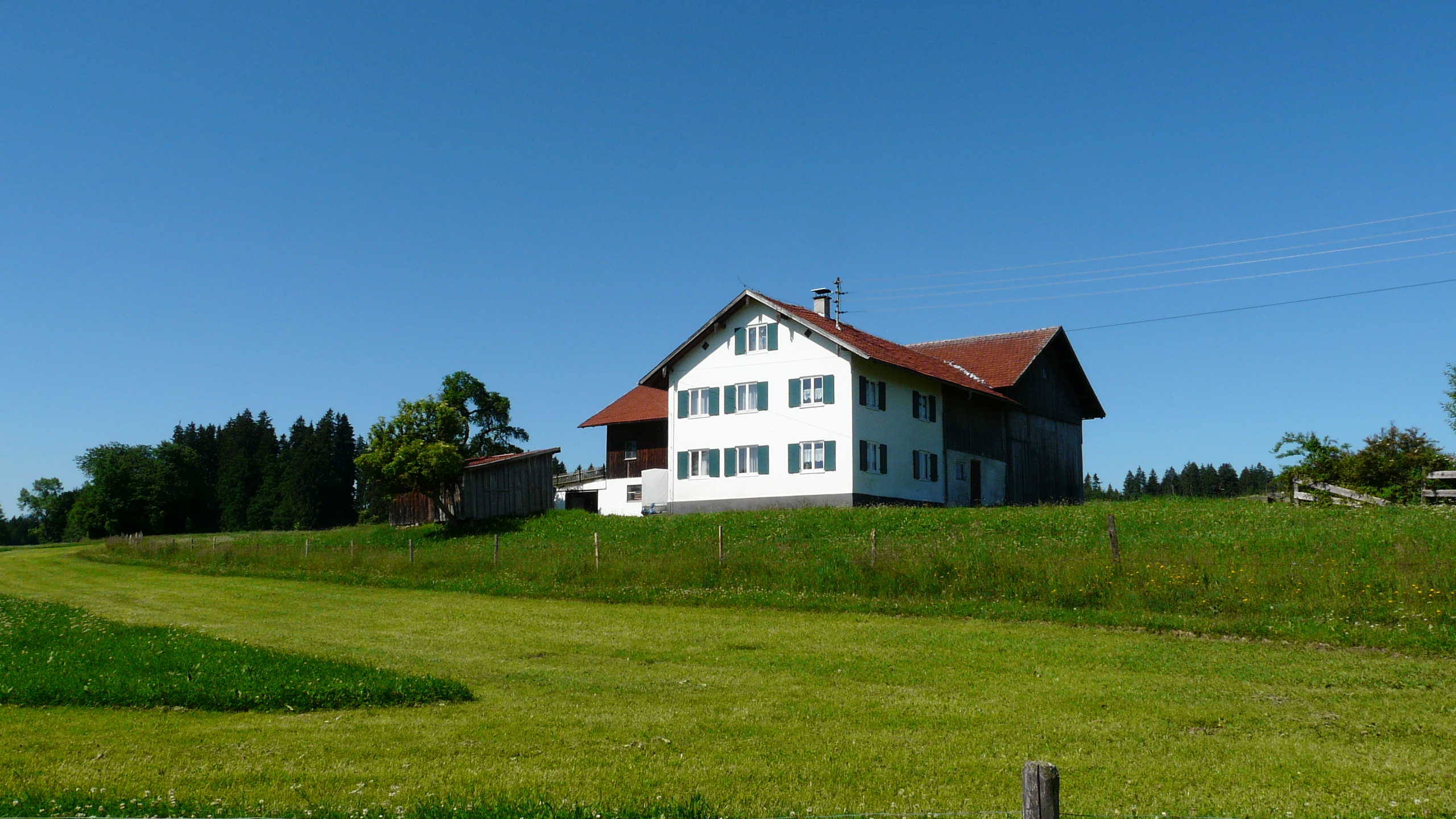
Stein

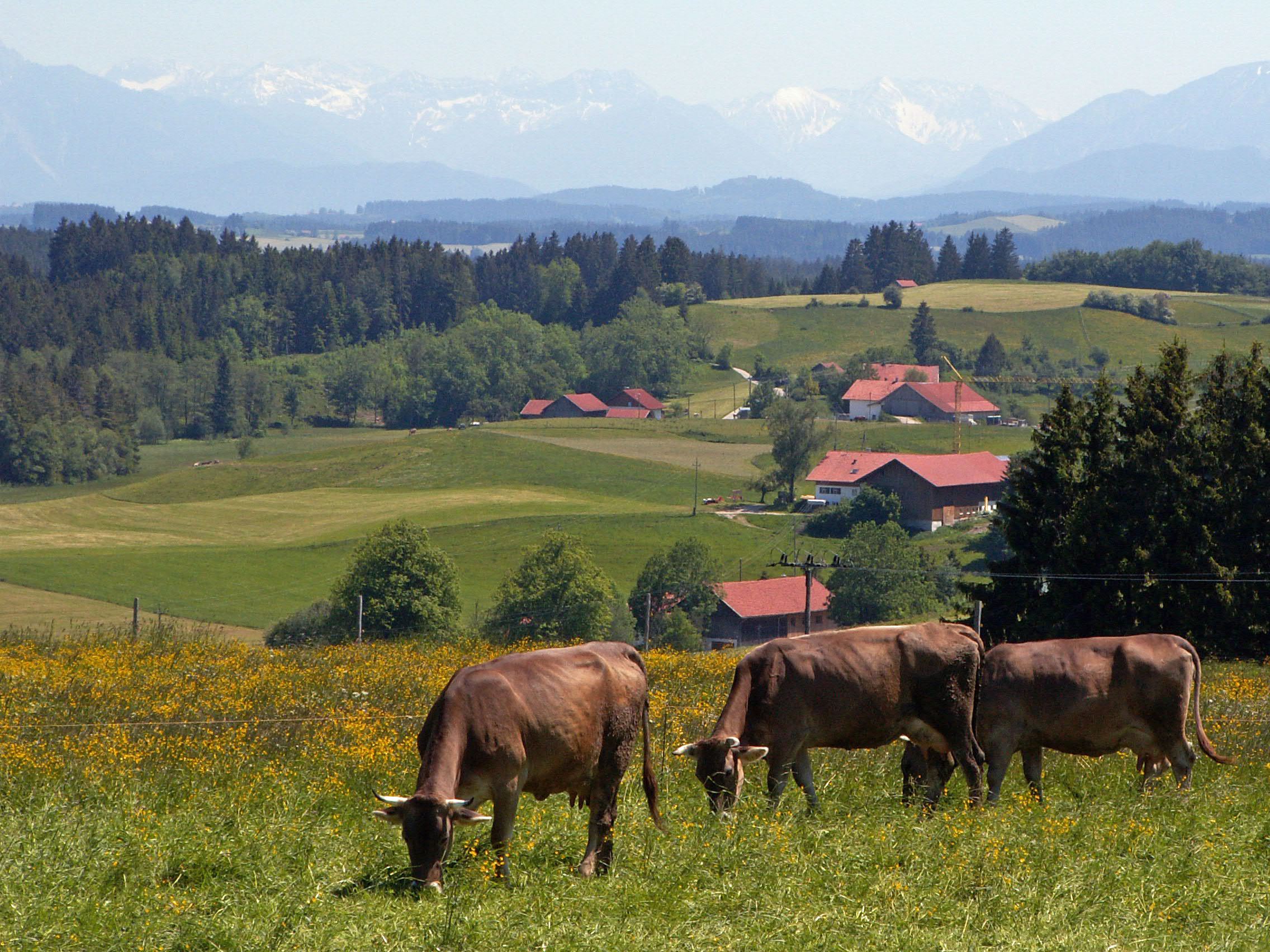
Unterhalden
