= Dettingen an der Iller =

- Municipality
- Coat of arms

- Location of Dettingen an der Iller within Biberach district
- Interactive map of Dettingen an der Iller
- Location within Germany Location within Baden-Württemberg
- Coordinates: 48°6′32″N 10°6′43″E
- Country: Germany
- State: Baden-Württemberg
- Admin. region: Tübingen
- District: Biberach

Government
  - Mayor (2018–26): Alois Ruf

Area
  - Total: 11.14 km^{2} (4.30 sq mi)
- Elevation: 545 m (1,788 ft)

Population (2025-12-31)
  - Total: 2,785
  - Density: 250.0/km^{2} (647.5/sq mi)
- Time zone: UTC+01:00 (CET)
  - Summer (DST): UTC+02:00 (CEST)
- Postal codes: 88451
- Dialling codes: 07354
- Vehicle registration: BC
- Website: www.dettingen-iller.de

Dettingen an der Iller (German pronunciation: [ˈdɛtɪŋən ʔan deːɐ̯ ˈʔɪlɐ], lit. 'Dettingen on the Iller') is a town in the district of Biberach in Baden-Württemberg in Germany, located on the Iller river. At the end of 2015 its population was approximately 2100.
