= Echte =

Coordinates: 51°47′N 10°04′E

Echte is a village in the Gemeinde Kalefeld in the district of Northeim in northern Germany with about 1,380 inhabitants.

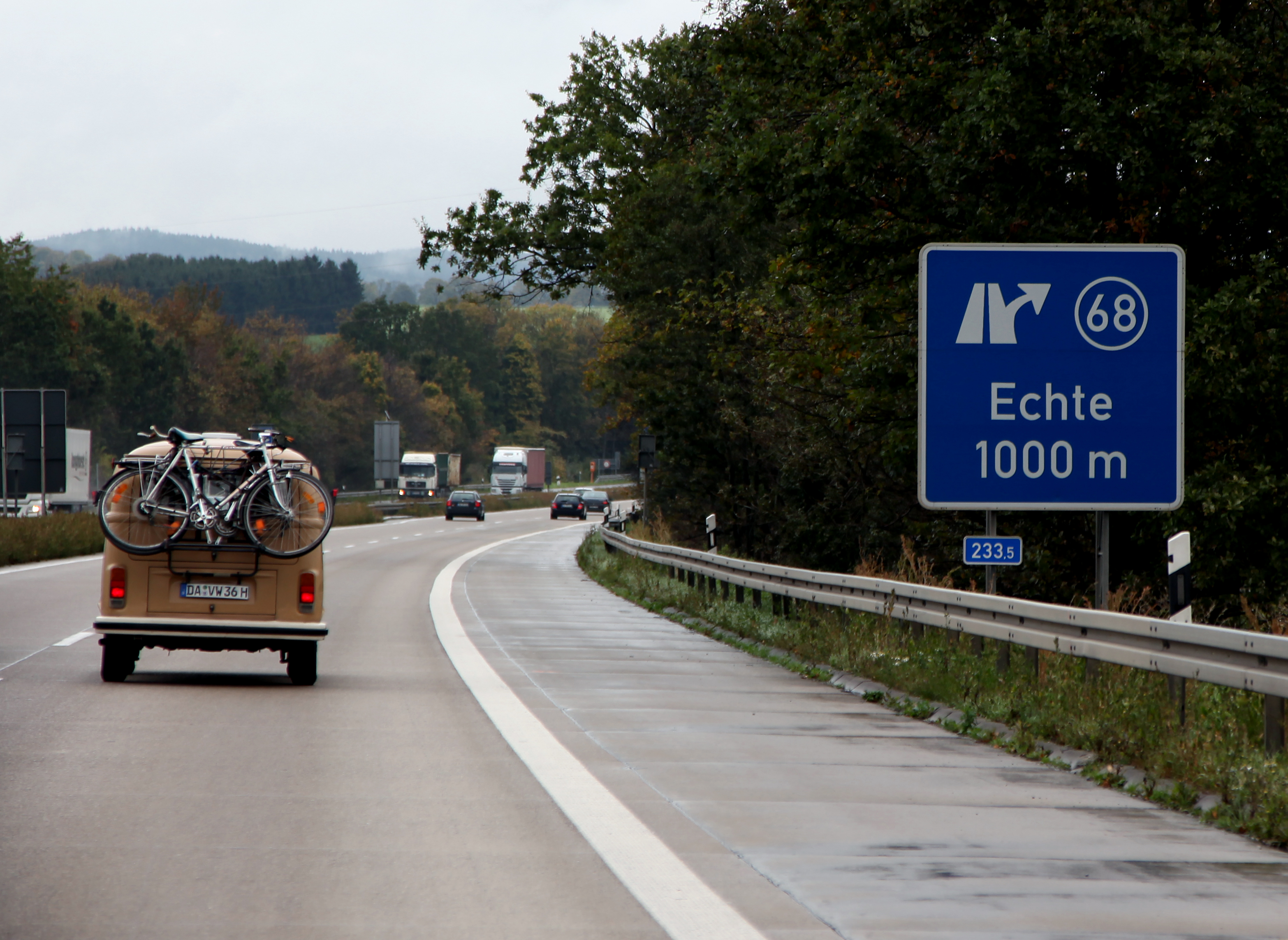

The earliest known archival reference to the community is in the Fuldaer Tradition 826, where it is referred to as Eti. In the Middle Ages, it served as a trade node on the east-west road between Einbeck and Osterode and the north-south road from Northeim to Seesen.

Skilled craftsmen were a significant part of the village's population as early as the 17th century. In 1657, of 362 residents, 16 were classified as craftsmen. About a century later (in 1779), the census showed 35 craftsmen out of 479 residents. Most numerous were linen weavers, followed by cobblers and then carpenters.

Echte took part in the great emigration from Germany to the New World in 1845-1846.

In 1936, Echte's population exceeded 1,000.

There are sixteen social, cultural or service associations in the community.
