= Oberthulba =

- Municipality
- Coat of arms

- Location of Oberthulba within Bad Kissingen district
- Interactive map of Oberthulba
- Location within Germany Location within Bavaria
- Coordinates: 50°12′N 9°58′E
- Country: Germany
- State: Bavaria
- Admin. region: Unterfranken
- District: Bad Kissingen
- Subdivisions: 8 Ortsteile

Government
  - Mayor (2020–26): Mario Götz

Area
  - Total: 52.24 km^{2} (20.17 sq mi)
- Elevation: 270 m (890 ft)

Population (2025-12-31)
  - Total: 4,954
  - Density: 94.83/km^{2} (245.6/sq mi)
- Time zone: UTC+01:00 (CET)
  - Summer (DST): UTC+02:00 (CEST)
- Postal codes: 97723
- Dialling codes: 09736
- Vehicle registration: KG
- Website: www.oberthulba.de

Oberthulba is a municipality in the district of Bad Kissingen in Bavaria in Germany.

== Divisions of the municipality ==
- Oberthulba
- Frankenbrunn
- Hassenbach
- Hetzlos
- Reith
- Schlimpfhof
- Thulba
- Wittershausen

== History ==
With secularization of the government in 1803, the territory of the present municipality became part of Bavaria. In the Treaty of Pressburg between France and Austria in 1805, the lands of the Bishop of Würzburg were given to Ferdinand III, Grand Duke of Tuscany, and he was made Grand Duke of Würzburg, a new state, as a reward for his support of Napoleon. These lands then again became part of Bavaria in 1814 (this time permanently) at the defeat of Napoleon.

== Population ==
Year	Population
1970	3717
1987	4261
2000	5121
2005	5177

== Coat of arms ==
The upper half is red, and the lower half has three white peaks with a blue band of waves. On the left is a silver bishop's staff, and on the right a gold St. John's cross.

== Economy ==
In 1998, there were 545 businesses in the municipality. In 1999, there were 108 agricultural businesses, with 2424 ha under cultivation, 1523 ha in fields, and 887 ha in pasture.

== Notable residents ==
- Herbert Neder, politician (CSU)
