= Hauneck =

- Municipality
- Coat of arms

- Location of Hauneck within Hersfeld-Rotenburg district
- Interactive map of Hauneck
- Location within Germany Location within Hesse
- Coordinates: 50°49′N 09°44′E
- Country: Germany
- State: Hesse
- Admin. region: Kassel
- District: Hersfeld-Rotenburg
- Subdivisions: 7 districts

Government
  - Mayor (2022–28): Stephan Bolender (SPD)

Area
  - Total: 17.75 km^{2} (6.85 sq mi)
- Elevation: 232 m (761 ft)

Population (2025-12-31)
  - Total: 3,049
  - Density: 171.8/km^{2} (444.9/sq mi)
- Time zone: UTC+01:00 (CET)
  - Summer (DST): UTC+02:00 (CEST)
- Postal codes: 36282
- Dialling codes: 06621
- Vehicle registration: HEF
- Website: www.hauneck.de

Hauneck is a municipality in Hersfeld-Rotenburg district in eastern Hesse, Germany.

== Geography ==
=== Location ===
The town of Bad Hersfeld lies right nearby to the north. Some 35 km away lie Fulda to the south and Alsfeld to the west.

The community stretches along the Haune. A few kilometres to the north, the Haune flows into the Fulda.

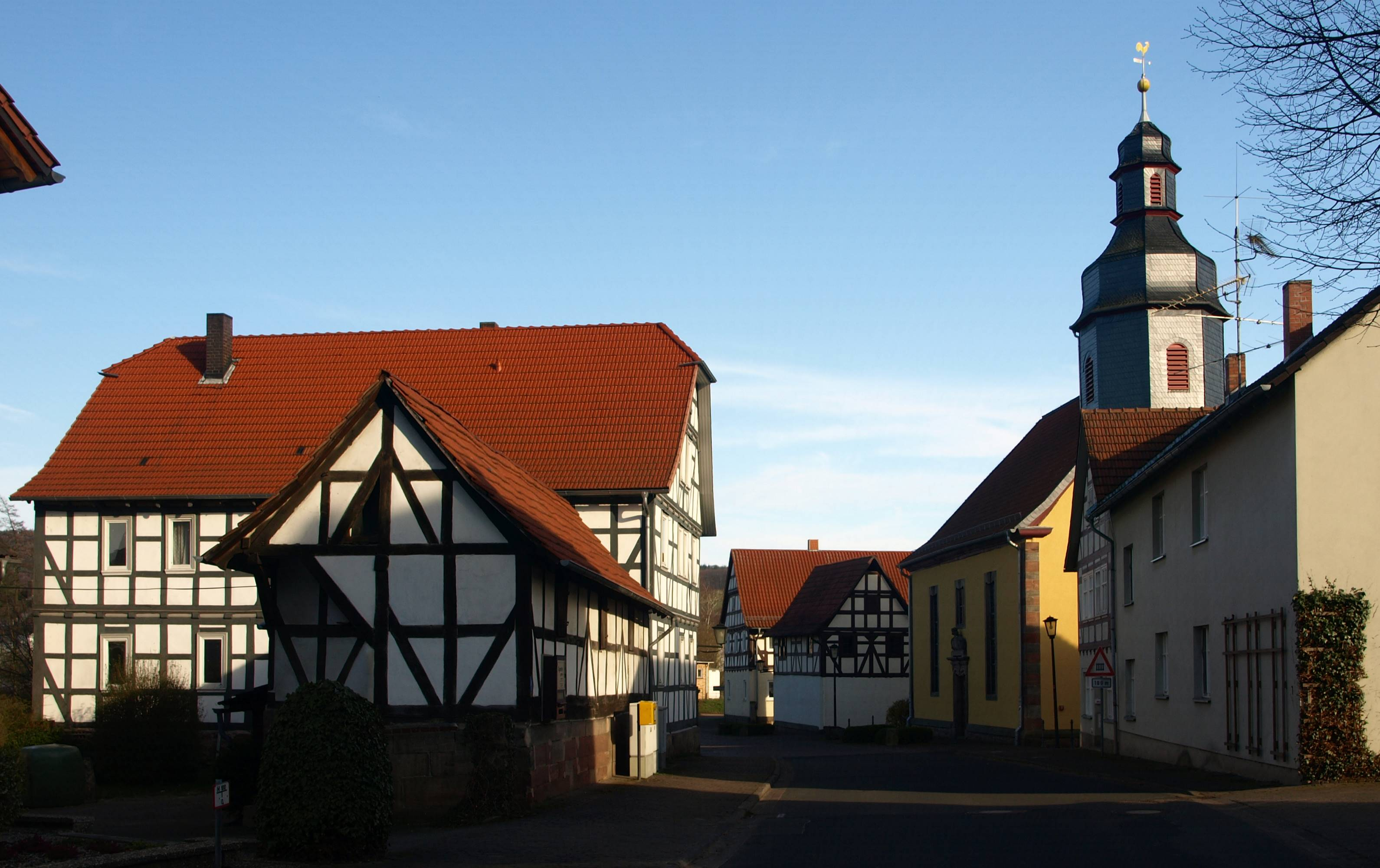
Main street in Unterhaun

=== Constituent communities ===
The community's Ortsteile are Bodes, Eitra, Fischbach, Oberhaun, Rotensee, Sieglos and Unterhaun.

=== Neighbouring communities ===
These are Bad Hersfeld, Schenklengsfeld, Eiterfeld, Haunetal and Niederaula.

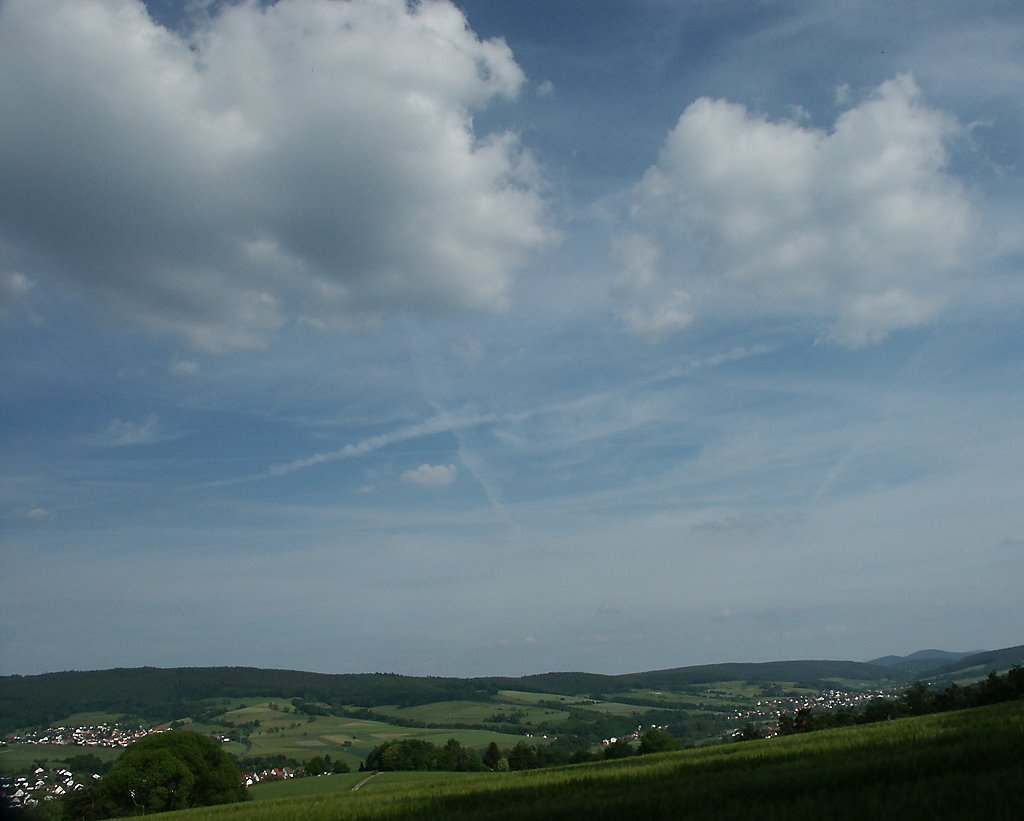
View over Hauneck

== History ==
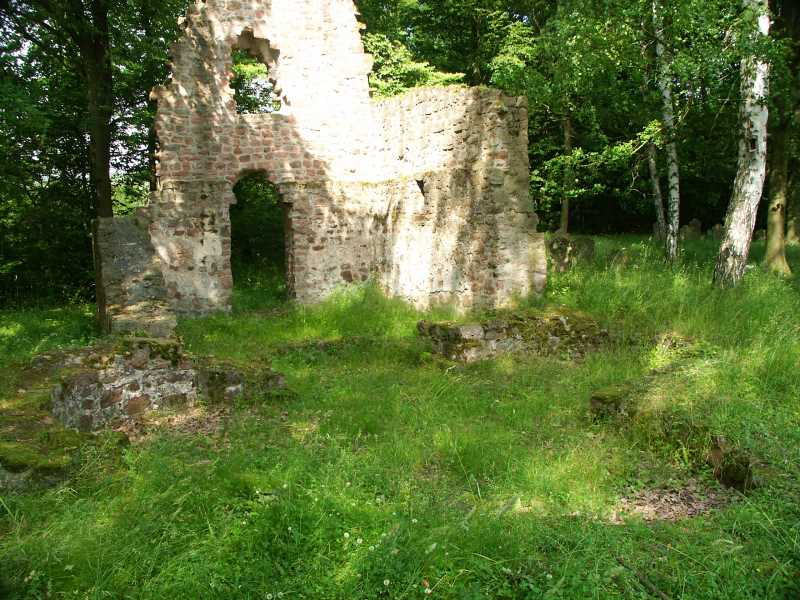
Church ruins in the mountain graveyard from the 10th century

In 972 came the first documentary mention of a chapel. It is believed to have served as a pilgrimage place. The village developing here had its first documentary mention in 1217 in a document from the abbot of Hersfeld Abbey, Ludwig I to the Vogt (roughly "reeve") Bertho von Buchenau, in which the place is named as Cruceberc. The chapel served over the centuries that followed as a village church. In the 16th century, the village was forsaken, until the late 17th century when another place, called Unterhaun, arose here. In 1736, the community acquired a new village church. Subsequently, the old chapel up on a bank overlooking the community fell into ruins in this century.

In the Middle Ages, the Knights of Buchenau (Buchenaouwe) held the Amt of Schildschlag and the court district of Johannesberg as a fief from the Hersfeld Abbey. To these areas belonged many of today's constituent communities. The Abbey also put the knights to work as Vögte. The Vogtei (Vogt's seat) and the court seat lay together with the St. Johannes provost's seat at the Johannesberg. Later, under the Landgraves of Hesse, the administrative areas were ruled from Hauneck Castle (now in ruins), out of which then came the community's name in 1971.

=== Amalgamations ===
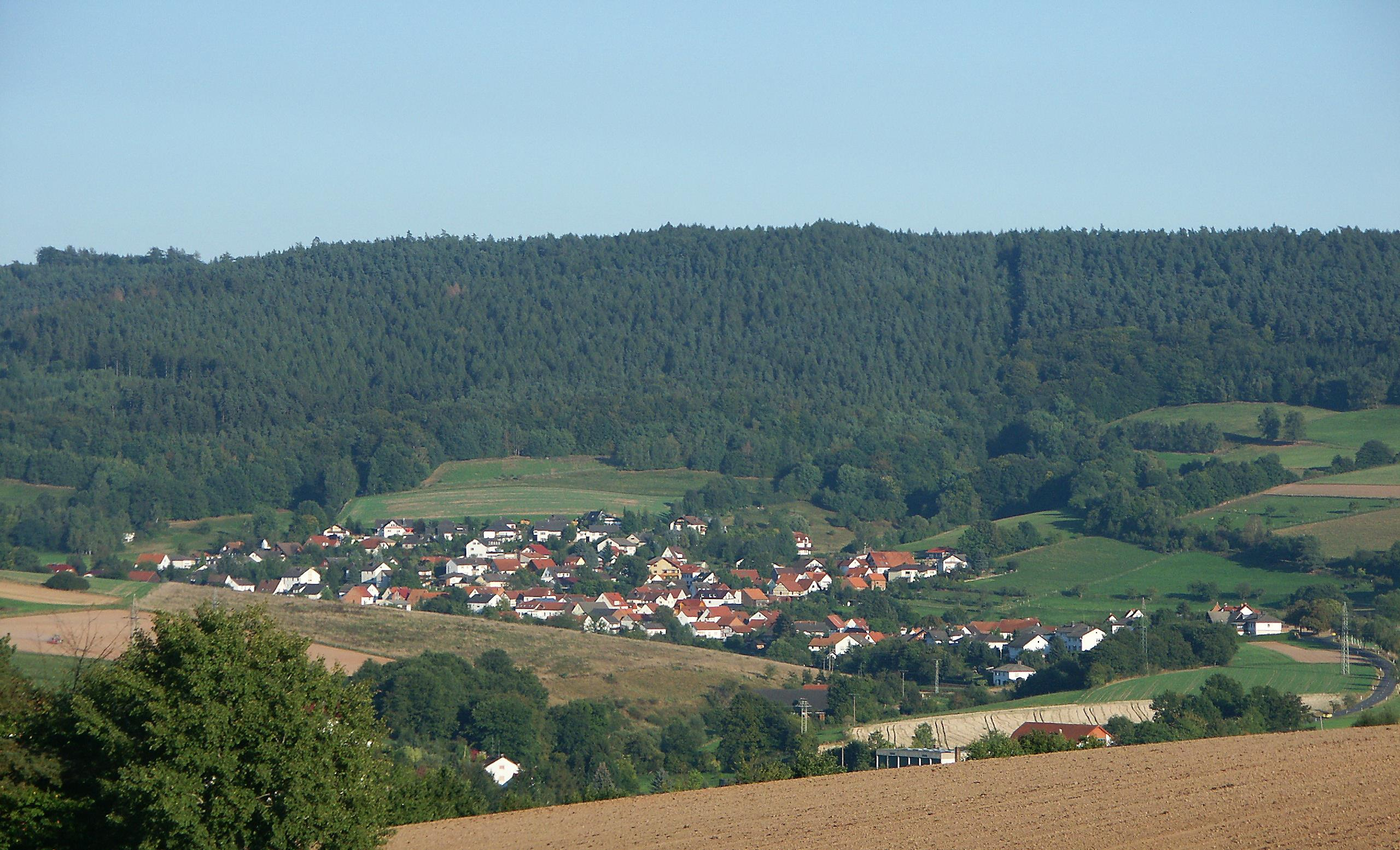
Rotensee

Through municipal reform on 31 December 1971, the community of Hauneck came into being with the amalgamation of Oberhaun, Rotensee, Sieglos and Unterhaun. In 1972, the formerly self-administering communities of Bodes, Fischbach and Eitra also joined the community.

=== Population development ===
Year	1830	1939	1970	1987	2001
Inhabitants	1,249	2,127	2,990	3,593	3,729

== Politics ==
=== Community council ===
The municipal election held on 26 March 2006 yielded the following results:

Parties and voter communities		% 2006	Seats; 2006	% 2001	Seats; 2001
CDU	Christian Democratic Union of Germany	12.4	3	15.3	3
SPD	Social Democratic Party of Germany	55.0	13	63.9	15
FWG	Freie Wählergemeinschaft	32.7	7	20.8	5
Total		100.0	23	100.0	23
Voter turnout in %		57.5		60.3	

The community's executive (Gemeindevorstand) is made up of six members, with four seats allotted to the SPD, one to the CDU and 1 to the FWG.

=== Mayor ===
The mayor Stephan Bolender (SPD) was elected on 16 January 2022 with 74% of the vote.

=== Coat of arms ===
The community's arms might be described thus: Argent a bend wavy azure between seven mullets of six gules.

The wavy bend (diagonal stripe) stands for the Haune, which flows through the community. The mullets of six (six-pointed stars) symbolize the community's seven constituent communities.

== Economy and infrastructure ==
=== Transport ===
Hauneck lies right on Autobahn/highway/Autoroute 4, right near interchange 32 (Bad Hersfeld). Bundesstraße 27 runs along the Haune through the community. The Bebra–Fulda railway runs through Hauneck.

== Culture and sightseeing ==
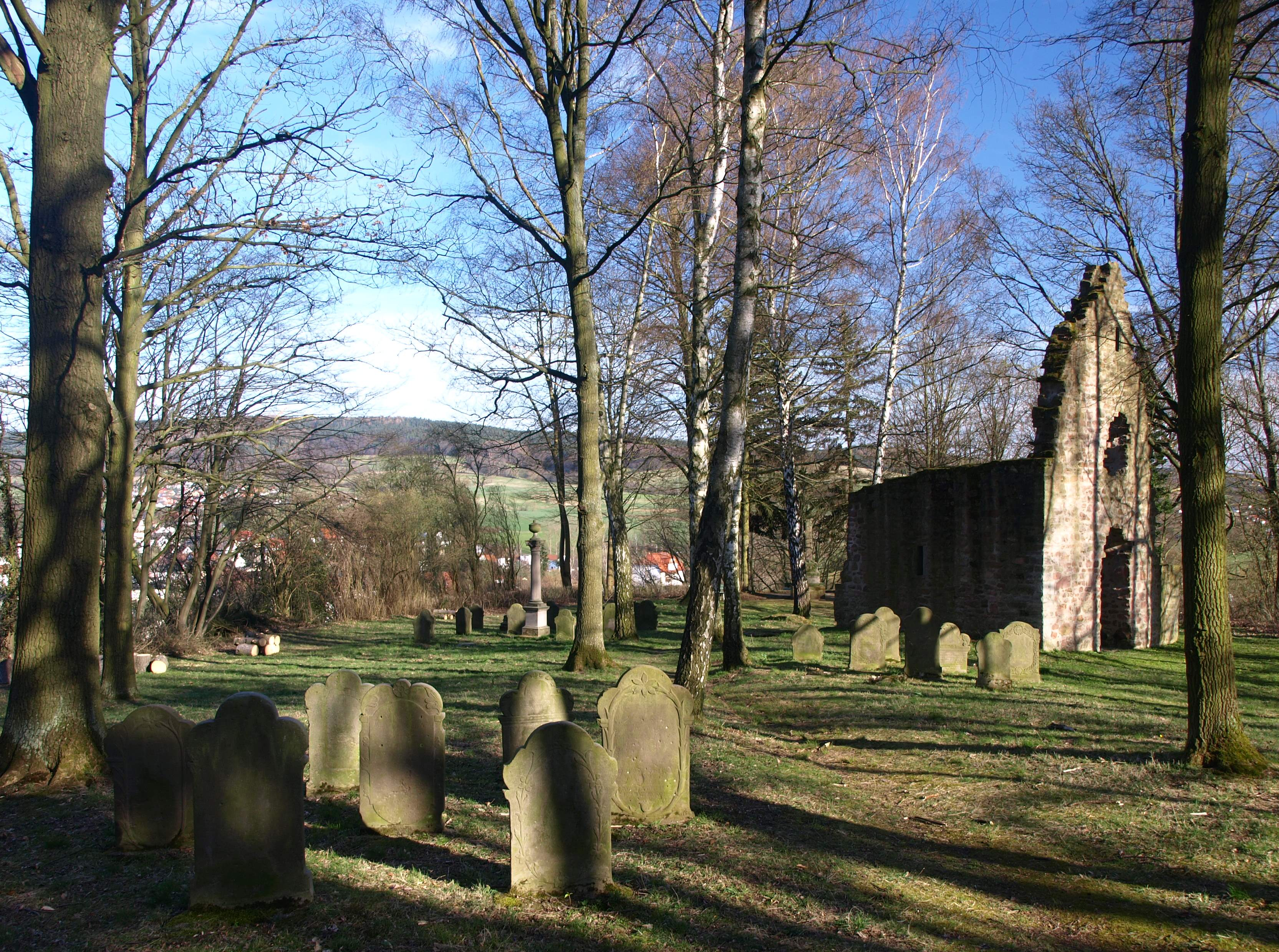
Kirchberg graveyard and chapel ruins, Unterhaun

=== Buildings ===
- Church in Oberhaun from the 14th century
- Old graveyard in Unterhaun with chapel ruins (from 972) on the Crucaberc (Kirchberg)
