= Niederaula =

- Municipality
- Coat of arms

- Location of Niederaula within Hersfeld-Rotenburg district
- Interactive map of Niederaula
- Location within Germany Location within Hesse
- Coordinates: 50°48′N 09°36′E
- Country: Germany
- State: Hesse
- Admin. region: Kassel
- District: Hersfeld-Rotenburg

Government
  - Mayor (2020–26): Thomas Rohrbach (Ind.)

Area
  - Total: 64.17 km^{2} (24.78 sq mi)
- Elevation: 200–400 m (660–1,310 ft)

Population (2025-12-31)
  - Total: 5,201
  - Density: 81.05/km^{2} (209.9/sq mi)
- Time zone: UTC+01:00 (CET)
  - Summer (DST): UTC+02:00 (CEST)
- Postal codes: 36272
- Dialling codes: 06625
- Vehicle registration: HEF
- Website: www.niederaula.de

Niederaula is a market community in Hersfeld-Rotenburg district in northeastern Hesse, Germany, 59 km south of Kassel.

== Geography ==
=== Location ===
The community lies on the Fulda between the outliers of the Rhön, the Vogelsberg and the Knüllgebirge (ranges). Within town limits, the rivers Aula, Jossa and Hattenbach all empty into the Fulda.

The nearest major towns or cities are Bad Hersfeld, 10 km to the northeast, Alsfeld, 24 km to the west and Fulda, 29 km to the south.

=== Neighbouring communities ===
Niederaula borders in the north on the community of Kirchheim and the town of Bad Hersfeld, in the east on the community of Hauneck, in the south on the community of Haunetal (all in Hersfeld-Rotenburg) and the town of Schlitz (in the Vogelsbergkreis) and in the west on the community of Breitenbach am Herzberg (in Hersfeld-Rotenburg).

=== Constituent communities ===
Niederaula’s eight Ortsteile are Niederaula, Mengshausen, Solms, Niederjossa (700 inhabitants), Hattenbach, Kleba, Kerspenhausen and Hilperhausen.

== History ==
In 779, Niederaula had its first documentary mention in connection with one of Charlemagne’s donations to the Hersfeld Abbey. The outlying centre of Niederjossa held a 1,225-year jubilee celebration in the first week of August 2007.

=== Amalgamations ===
In 1970, the communities of Niederaula and Mengshausen merged into a greater community. In 1972, the communities of Kleba, Hattenbach, Niederjossa, Solms and Kerspenhausen with its outlying centres of Roßbach and Hilperhausen also joined.

== Politics ==
=== Community council ===
The municipal election held on 26 March 2006 yielded the following results:

Parties and voter communities		% 2006	Seats; 2006	% 2001	Seats; 2001
CDU	Christian Democratic Union of Germany	33.5	10	31.5	10
SPD	Social Democratic Party of Germany	63.1	20	66.1	20
GREENS	Bündnis 90/Die Grünen	3.4	1	2.4	1
Total		100.0	31	100.0	31
Voter turnout in %		55.6		64.8	

=== Mayors ===
The mayor Helmut Opfer (SPD) was elected on 22 September 2002 with 88.0% of the vote.

On 14 September 2008, Thomas Rohrbach (independent) was elected with 54.29% of the vote.

=== Coat of arms ===
The community’s arms might be described thus: Gules a fess wavy abased argent, above which an owl guardant of the second armed Or, in chief sinister a mullet of eight of the second.

The coat of arms was conferred on the community on 28 February 1978.

The owl comes from the name of the river Aula, pronounced similarly to the English word "owl", although the German word is Eule, pronounced [ˈɔʏlə]. The wavy fess stands for the four rivers that flow through Niederaula and the eight-pointed star stands for the community’s eight centres. The star was chosen because the Counts of Ziegenhain, who bore a star in their arms, were for centuries influential here.

== Culture and sightseeing ==
=== Buildings ===
- Heussner-Turm, a lookout tower on the Mengshäuser Kuppe
- Wallenfels castle site

=== Sport ===
The skat club Aulataler Asse – the second word means “Aces” – won the International Skat Players Association cup final in partnership with the club Alter Markt from Borken in 2007.

== Economy and infrastructure ==
Given its geographical location and its favourable transport connections, Niederaula has developed itself into a “logistical centre”, as at the time of German reunification, it found itself right in the middle of the newly reconstituted country. Several logistical service businesses have built central locations in Niederaula for the transfer of their transports.

=== Transport ===
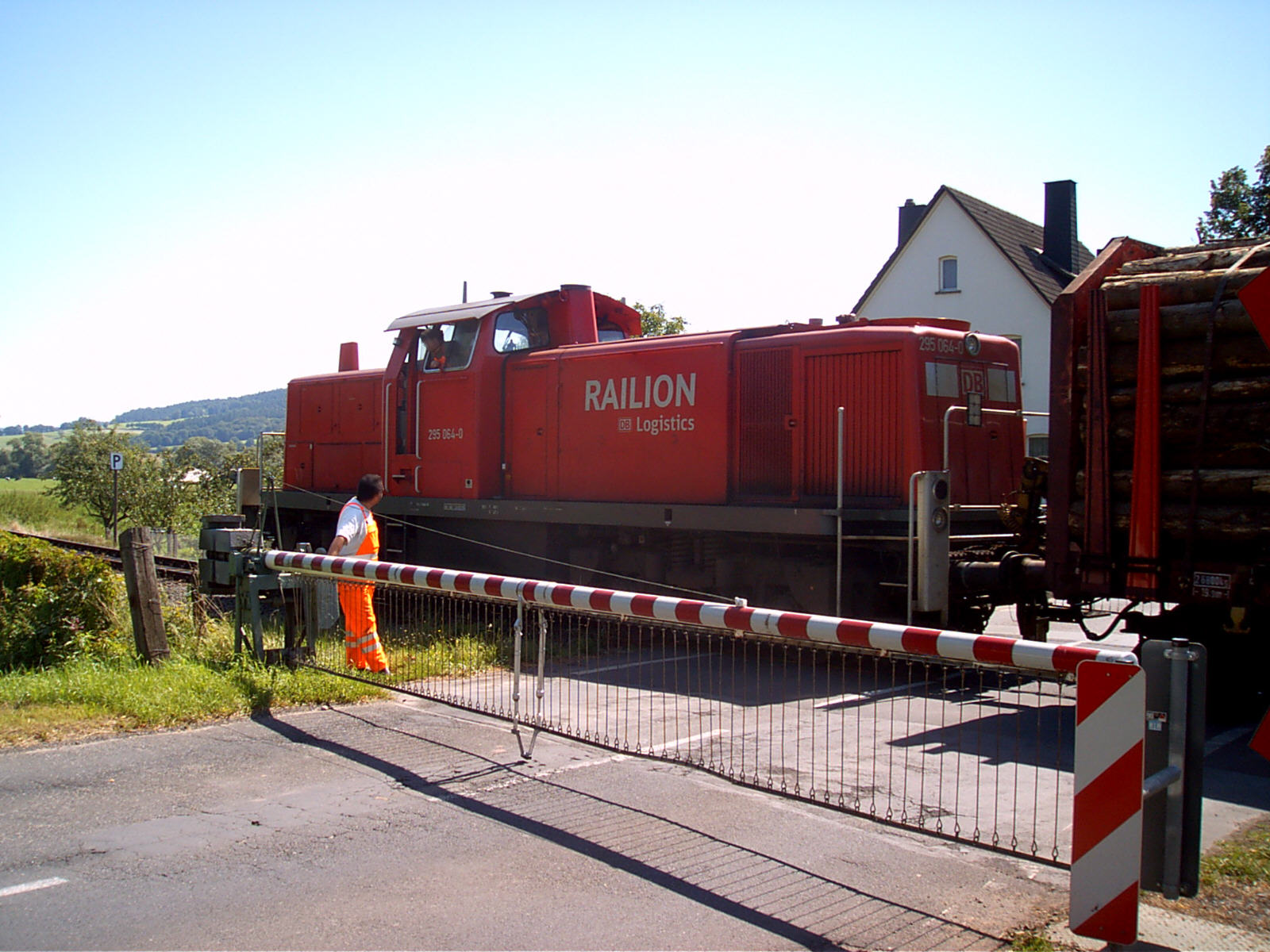
Goods train at the manual level crossing in Niederaula

Niederaula lies right at the Autobahn interchanges known as the Kirchheim and Hattenbach Triangles – so-called because each is a three-way Autobahn junction – putting Autobahnen A 4 (Aachen–Görlitz), A 5 (Hattenbach–Basel) and A 7 (Flensburg–Füssen) right nearby. The A 7 Kirchheim interchange is 5 km away from Niederaula, and the Niederaula interchange 2 km away. Furthermore, Bundesstraße 62 runs through Niederaula, although because it parallels the Autobahnen, it has no further importance to long-distance travel, merely serving now as a bypass.

Not far from the community’s western edge runs the Hanover-Würzburg high-speed rail line, although trains do not stop there. Even the small railway station on the Bad Hersfeld-Treysa and Niederaula-Alsfeld lines sees no more passenger service, and goods trains only run for operational reasons owing to a manual level crossing. The nearest railway service is therefore to be had in the district seat of Bad Hersfeld some 12 km away.

Buslines 322, 372 and 374 run to Bad Hersfeld, as does the shared taxi 371, which can be arranged by telephone. All these services are run by the Nordhessischer Verkehrsverbund (“North Hesse Transport Association”, NVV).

=== Established businesses ===
- Deutsche Post international postal distribution centre
- TNT Innight GmbH & Co. KG hub and location
- UPS distribution centre
- General Overnight sorting centre
- Logit Services GmbH distribution centre
- System Alliance GmbH (piece goods) head office
- Gies GmbH & Co. Kunststoffwerk KG (plastic container manufacturer)
- Rotpunkt Dr. Anso Zimmermann GmbH (vacuum flask manufacturer)
- Julius Zange GmbH & Co.KG brickworks and specialized builders
