= Bad Hersfeld =

- Town
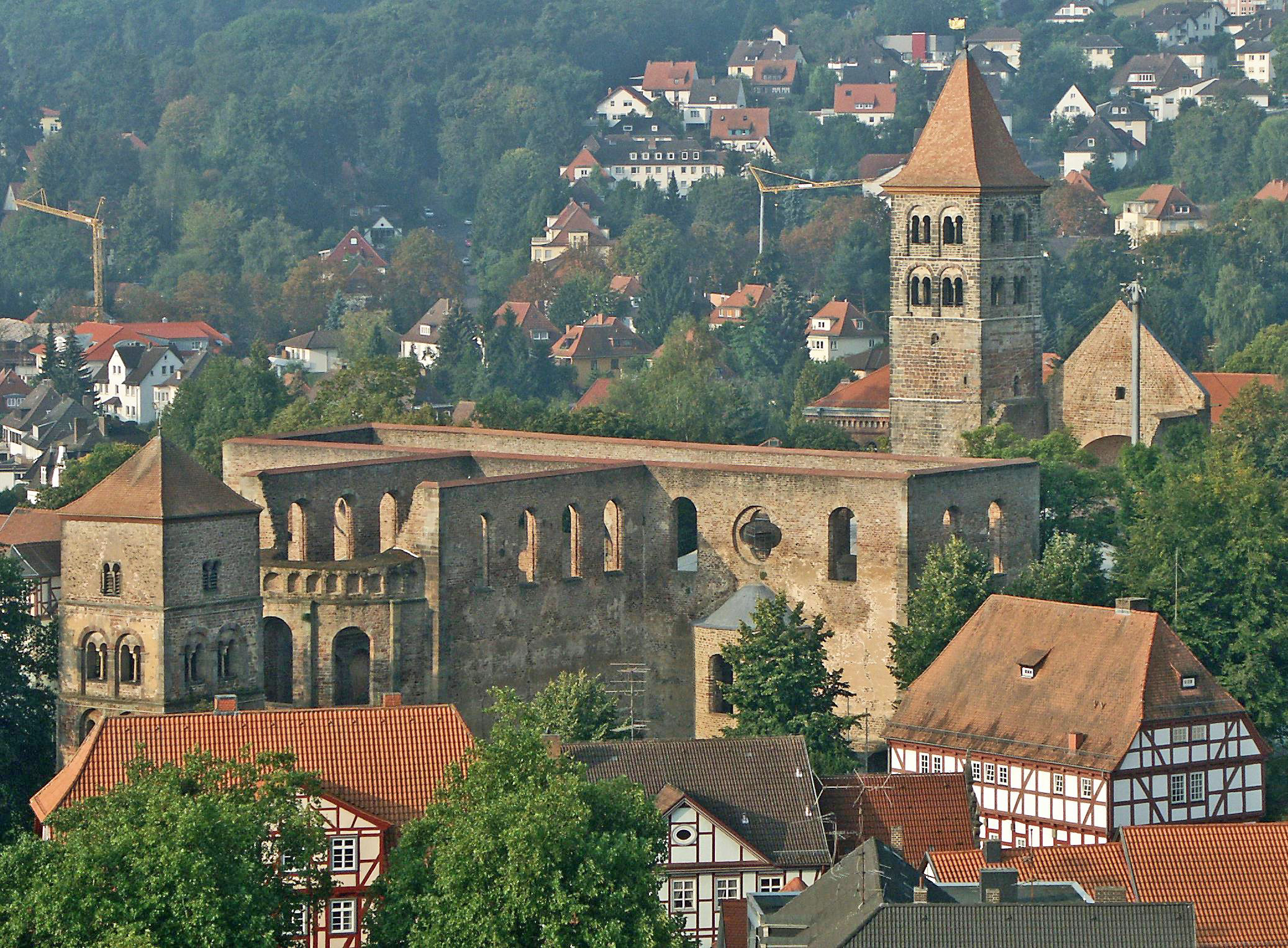
- View of the monastery ruins from the tower of the town church

- Coat of arms

- Location of Bad Hersfeld within Hersfeld-Rotenburg district
- Interactive map of Bad Hersfeld
- Location within Germany Location within Hesse
- Coordinates: 50°52′6″N 9°42′27″E
- Country: Germany
- State: Hesse
- Admin. region: Kassel
- District: Hersfeld-Rotenburg

Government
  - Mayor (2022–28): Anke Hofmann (Ind.)

Area
  - Total: 73.87 km^{2} (28.52 sq mi)
- Elevation: 212 m (696 ft)

Population (2025-12-31)
  - Total: 30,632
  - Density: 414.7/km^{2} (1,074/sq mi)
- Time zone: UTC+01:00 (CET)
  - Summer (DST): UTC+02:00 (CEST)
- Postal codes: 36251
- Dialling codes: 06621
- Vehicle registration: HEF
- Website: www.bad-hersfeld.de

The festival and spa town of Bad Hersfeld (German pronunciation: [baːt ˈhɛʁsfɛlt]; Bad is "spa" in German; the Old High German name of the city was Herolfisfeld) is the district seat of the Hersfeld-Rotenburg district in northeastern Hesse, Germany, roughly 50 km southeast of Kassel.

Bad Hersfeld is known countrywide above all for the Bad Hersfelder Festspiele (festival), which have taken place each year since 1951 at the monastery ruins. These themselves are said to be Europe's biggest Romanesque church ruin.

In 1967, the town hosted the seventh Hessentag state festival.

== Geography ==
=== Location ===
The town lies in the Hersfeld Basin formed here by the forks of the Fulda and the Haune. The inner town lies on the Fulda's left bank. Furthermore, the Geisbach and the Solz empty into the Fulda in the municipal area. In the southwest lie the Vogelsberg Mountains, in the northwest the Knüll and in the northeast the Seulingswald (ranges, the latter visible in the background of this image).

The town's lowest point, at 195 m above sea level, is to be found in the area where the Solz empties into the Fulda, whereas the highest point within town limits is the Laxberg in the Knüllgebirge, at 408 m above sea level.

The town can be said to belong both to Northern Hesse (Nordhessen) and Eastern Hesse (Osthessen).

The nearest cities are Kassel, 52 km to the north, Gießen, 79 km to the southwest, Fulda, 36 km to the south and Eisenach, 45 km to the east. Through Bad Hersfeld runs the Deutsche Fachwerkstraße ("German Timber Frame Road"), a holiday road that showcases many of Germany's timber-frame houses and buildings.

=== Geology ===
The Old Town stands on an alluvial or fluvial fan made of gravel and pebbles, which were washed up between Fulda and Geisbach. Also in the Fulda valley are found gravel and pebbles from the Holocene that are mostly of alluvial origin. There are layers of flood-deposited loess and loam of Pleistocene origin running through them. The gravel and pebbles are to a great extent made up of Middle Bunter, the most widespread stone here. In the west and east, this layer reaches from the Germanic Triassic on the Stellerskuppe (480.5 m above sea level) and the Haukuppe (446.1 m above sea level) up to 400 m above sea level. In the east, on the Wippershainer Höhe (heights), the layer reaches up to 440 m above sea level. The Middle Bunter's lower limit is found at about 110 m above sea level.

Newer mineral layers from the Triassic are found only in sporadic deposits and discontinuous layers within town limits. This is the Röt formation, which crops up in the headwaters of the many small brooks around the town. The Lower or Middle Muschelkalk that overlies it can only be found in a narrow, west-to-east running rift stretching between Heenes and Oberrode, north of the inner town. The newest mineral layer from the Triassic – the Lower Keuper (for example the so-called Lettenkohlensandstein) – is only preserved in the region under a lava flow, which does not show itself above ground anywhere near the town.

Owing to uplift in the Jurassic and Cretaceous, there are no mineral layers from these geological time periods. Volcanic rock from the Miocene can be found on the Haukuppe.

Mineral layers that do not reach the surface here are the Lower Bunter, running from a depth of some 90 m underneath the town (about 110 m above sea level) down to some 390 m farther down, and, following at yet greater depths, Upper and Lower Zechstein from the Permian. From this layer come the two mineral springs in Bad Hersfeld. This layer is also used in underground mining from the 400-metre level on down on the Werra (Heringen, Philippsthal) and on the Fulda (Neuhof bei Fulda), yielding potash.

=== Municipal area’s extent ===
Today's main town spreads over the slopes of the Tageberg (323.5 m above sea level), the Frauenberg (310 m), the Wehneberg (320 m) and the Wendeberg (291 m), further reaching into the valleys of the Meisebach and the Geisbach. From southwest to northeast it stretches some 4.5 km, and from northeast to southwest some 3.5 km.

The Old Town in the Fulda valley has an oval shape and an area of some 40 ha. From west to east it stretches some 960 m and from south to north some 570 m. This can still clearly be seen today, as where the town moat once led around the town there is today a ringroad that leads traffic around it.

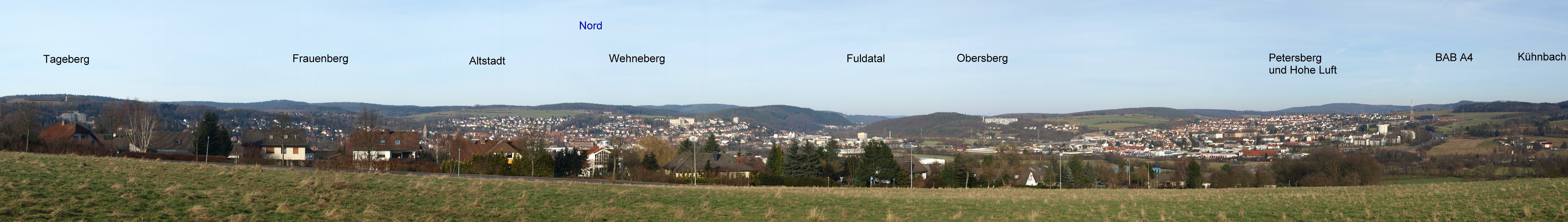
View from the Johannesberg over Bad Hersfeld

=== Constituent communities ===
Besides the main town – also called Bad Hersfeld – the town also has the outlying centres of Allmershausen, Asbach, Beiershausen, Eichhof, Heenes, Hohe Luft, Johannesberg, Kathus, Kohlhausen, Petersberg and Sorga.

Further subdivisions in the main town are not officially Stadtteile. The Old Town itself is divided into the Stiftsbezirk ("Monastery Zone") and the Unterstadt ("Lower Town") to the east. Between the two lies the oldest part of the Old Town. The spa is centred in a spot west of the Stiftsbezirk and is considered part of the main town. Furthermore, there are Kalkobes (a village that was amalgamated by the turn of the 20th century), Wehneberg (which arose from a lordly estate), Zellersgrund, Oberrode (an agricultural operation), Hof Hählgans (likewise an agricultural operation) and Mönches (now forsaken; a former forester's house stands here).

=== Neighbouring communities ===
Clockwise from the north, these are Ludwigsau, Friedewald, Schenklengsfeld, Hauneck, Niederaula, Kirchheim and Neuenstein.

=== Climate ===
The town's sheltered location in the Fulda valley with the surrounding Hessian and Thuringian low mountain ranges leads to a relatively high average yearly temperature in Bad Hersfeld of 8.7 °C and a rather dry climate with yearly precipitation averaging only 718.1 mm. The average yearly sunshine, therefore, is quite high at 1,385.4 hours. On average over the year, Bad Hersfeld has 34 "summer days" (that is, with temperatures reaching 25 °C or higher), 86 "frost days" (with the day's lowest temperature below 0 °C) and 22 "ice days" (with the day's temperature never rising above 0 °C).

Climate data for Bad Hersfeld (1991–2020 normals)
Month	Jan	Feb	Mar	Apr	May	Jun	Jul	Aug	Sep	Oct	Nov	Dec	Year
Mean daily maximum °C (°F)	3.4 (38.1)	5.0 (41.0)	9.5 (49.1)	14.8 (58.6)	18.8 (65.8)	22.1 (71.8)	24.4 (75.9)	24.1 (75.4)	19.3 (66.7)	13.6 (56.5)	7.6 (45.7)	4.1 (39.4)	13.9 (57.0)
Daily mean °C (°F)	0.8 (33.4)	1.4 (34.5)	4.7 (40.5)	9.0 (48.2)	13.0 (55.4)	16.3 (61.3)	18.2 (64.8)	17.8 (64.0)	13.5 (56.3)	9.1 (48.4)	4.7 (40.5)	1.8 (35.2)	9.2 (48.6)
Mean daily minimum °C (°F)	−1.9 (28.6)	−1.9 (28.6)	0.4 (32.7)	3.2 (37.8)	7.0 (44.6)	10.4 (50.7)	12.4 (54.3)	12.0 (53.6)	8.6 (47.5)	5.3 (41.5)	1.9 (35.4)	−0.8 (30.6)	4.7 (40.5)
Average precipitation mm (inches)	51.3 (2.02)	39.3 (1.55)	46.0 (1.81)	40.6 (1.60)	66.9 (2.63)	57.9 (2.28)	83.3 (3.28)	60.4 (2.38)	50.1 (1.97)	52.8 (2.08)	52.3 (2.06)	53.5 (2.11)	654.4 (25.76)
Average precipitation days (≥ 1.0 mm)	17.9	15.8	15.8	12.7	14.2	13.7	14.9	13.7	13.1	15.8	17.1	18.9	183.7
Average snowy days (≥ 1.0 cm)	8.4	7.3	2.6	0.2	0	0	0	0	0	0	1.6	4.7	24.8
Average relative humidity (%)	85.9	82.4	77.1	70.6	72.3	72.6	72.1	73.4	80.1	85.7	88.7	88.5	79.1
Mean monthly sunshine hours	44.1	67.8	115.4	172.0	197.6	203.3	213.2	197.6	142.1	88.7	39.2	31.5	1,511.5
Source: World Meteorological Organization

== History ==
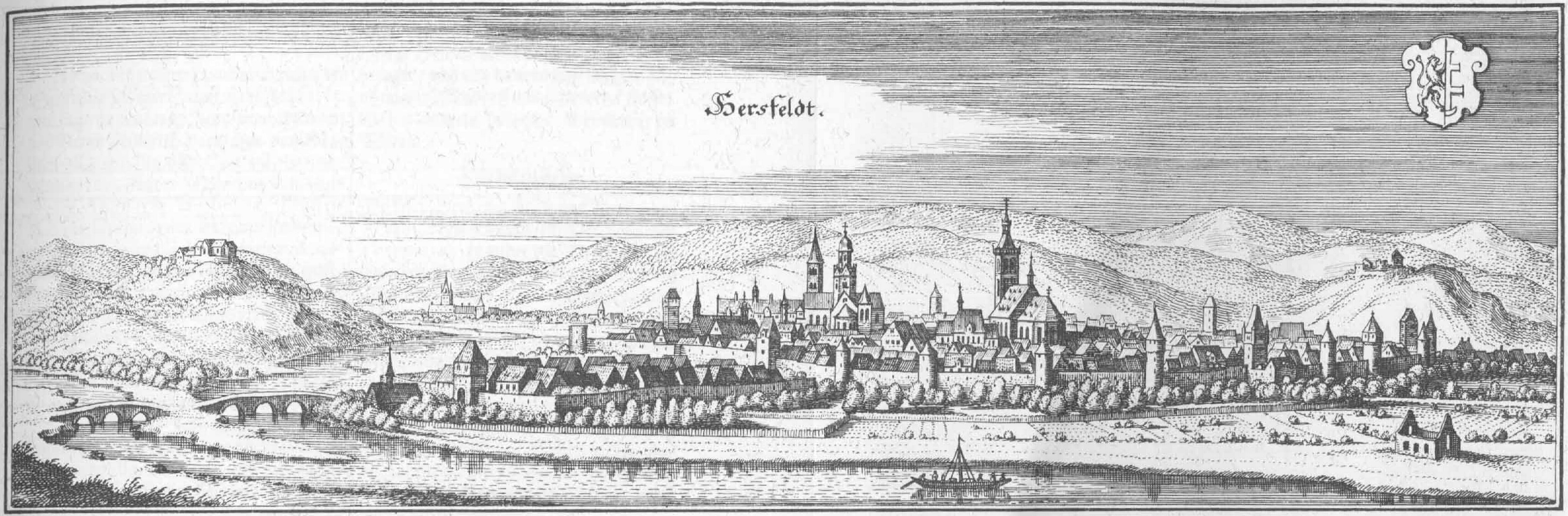
Copperplate engraving of Hersfeld in 1655 (Matthäus Merian the Younger)

Bad Hersfeld's written history begins with the monk Sturm, who established a monastic settlement in Haerulfisfeld but later evacuated it to Fulda, and with Lullus, who reëstablished the Benedictine Hersfeld Abbey in 769. Both had been missionary bishop Boniface's disciples. The monastery was enlarged between 831 and 850 and Lullus's remains were moved in 852 to another grave in the new basilica. During this ceremony his canonisation was announced by Rabanus Maurus. Since 852, the Lullusfest, the oldest folk festival in Germany, has been celebrated in the week of Saint Lullus's day, 16 October (his day of death). Martin Luther visited the monastery, on his way back from the Diet of Worms in 1521 and held a sermon in the abbey church on 1 May. About two years later, the town and the territory of the abbey was mostly Protestant.

It has been shown, however, through archaeological digs that today's townsite has a considerably longer settlement history, with traces of habitation going back to the New Stone Age about 2000 BC; a Bronze Age grave from about 1200 BC has also been unearthed, as have finds from La Tène times about 400 BC.

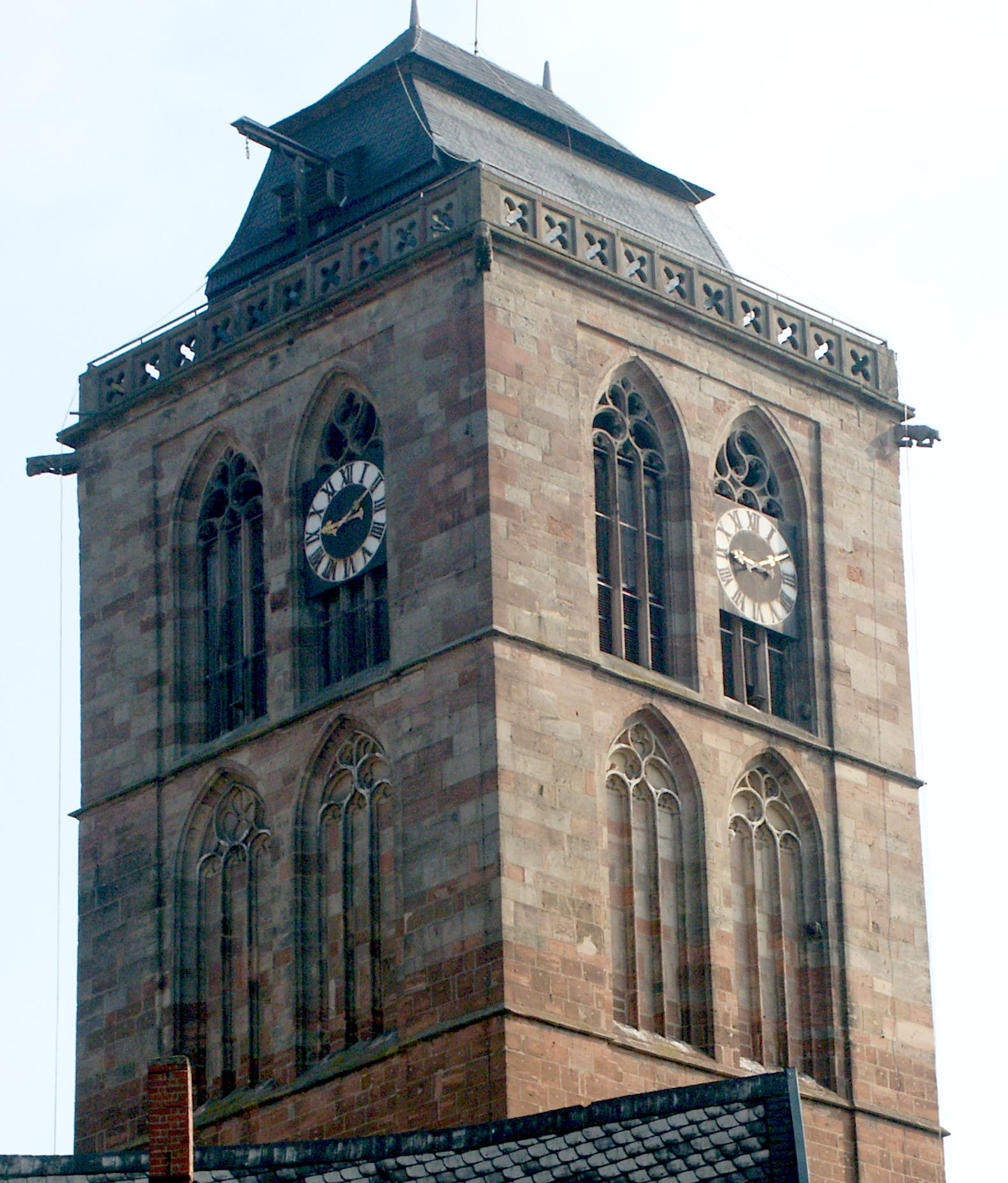
The town's landmark, the tower of the Hersfelder Stadtkirche (Town church)

Hersfeld was first mentioned as a market centre in 1142 and as a town in 1170. At this time also came the Hersfeld Abbey's greatest importance in Imperial politics. In the centuries that followed, the Abbey's might ebbed as after the Great Interregnum (1254–1273) it could no longer enjoy the Holy Roman Emperor’s support. Beginning in 1373, the Landgraviate of Hesse acquired influence over the town through defensive alliances. On Vitalisnacht (Saint Vitalis’s night, 27–28 April) 1378, the power struggle between the Abbey and the town reached its high point. Because of the German Peasants' War in 1525, great parts of the town and the Abbey passed to Hesse. In 1606, the last abbot died and in the Peace of Westphalia in 1648, the Imperial Abbey, raised to Electorate, was awarded to the Landgraviate of Hesse-Kassel. Hersfeld, now a worldly electorate, henceforth belonged to Hesse-Kassel.

In 1439, great parts of the town were destroyed by fire. The oldest timber-frame house in town is the Küsterhaus (Sexton’s House") from 1452. Abbot Ludwig V (1571–1588) brought the town its last building boom for centuries in which he had the Abbey's buildings expanded and converted in the "Weser Renaissance" style. These can still be seen throughout the Old Town, for instance the former mint and the Schloss Eichhof (palatial castle).

During the Seven Years' War the French army used the former abbey church as a supply and food depot. In 1761, the French burnt the church and the monastery buildings down to destroy their supplies during their retreat, thus destroying one of the largest churches in Germany, and in 1807, the town was almost utterly destroyed by Napoleonic occupation troops, but was spared when it turned out that Baden Lieutenant Colonel Johann Baptist Lingg von Linggenfeld would only carry out Napoleon's orders "literally": he was supposed to set fire to the town on all four sides, and this he did by having four buildings, each standing away from others, set on fire.

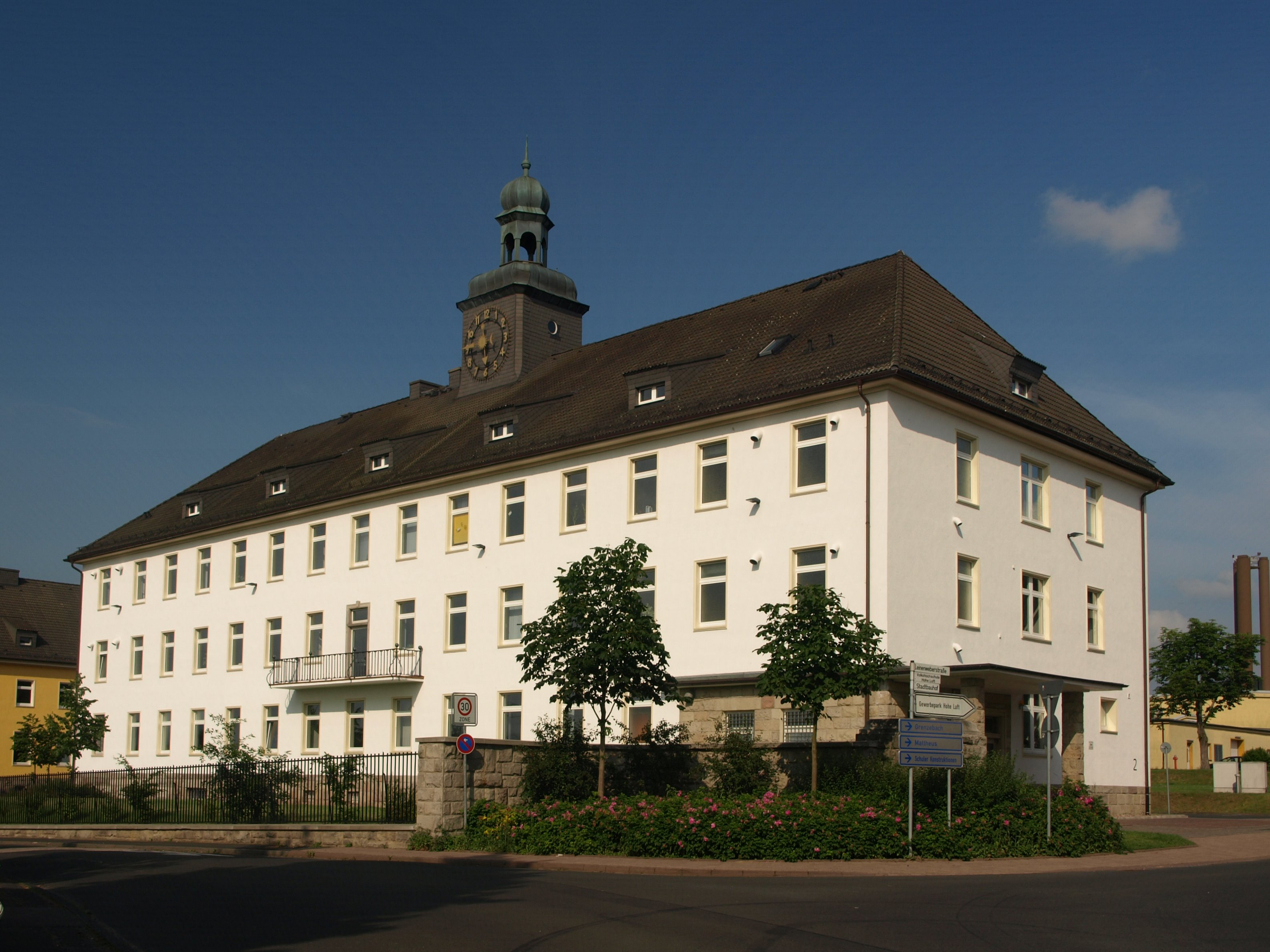
Main building of the former barracks in Bad Hersfeld (Hohe Luft). Between 1948 and 1993 it was the McPheeters Barracks of the United States Army.

During the American Revolution King George III of Great Britain hired the Musketeer Regiment Prinz Carl along with other regiments from Frederick II, Landgrave of Hesse. The Musketeer Regiment Prinz Carl was stationed both before and after their return from America at Hersfeld.

In 1821, Hersfeld became the seat of Hersfeld district in the Electorate of Hesse. In the same century, Hersfeld was linked to the railway network in 1866, and the town has also had an Autobahn link since 1938 (today Bundesautobahn 7) northwards via Kassel and Hamburg to Scandinavia and southwards via Kirchheim, Baden-Württemberg and Bavaria to Austria. The Bundesautobahn 4 coming from Kirchheim links eastwards via Dresden and Görlitz to Poland. The development into a spa town began when the Lullusbrunnen (spring) was tapped in 1904.

In 1935 the barracks was built in the outskirts of Hersfeld (today Hohe Luft), by the Wehrmacht. In 1945, Hersfeld was once again spared utter destruction, when two officers who had been taken prisoner guaranteed the town's peaceful handover.

The United States Army took over the Wehrmacht's barracks. Between 1948 and 1993 it was the McPheeters Barracks. Here served the 3rd Squadron, 14th Armored Cavalry Regiment (1948 until 1972) and 11th Armored Cavalry Regiment (1972 until 1993) at the Inner German border. About 800 American soldiers manned the barracks and its three observation posts, designated OP Romeo, OP India and OP Oscar. They also conducted two patrols daily along the border trace. The Americans had no interest in civilians crossing the border. Theirs was a tactical mission to halt possible Warsaw Pact aggression. Bad Hersfeld lies in the Fulda Gap, a historical avenue used for armies of the past. Bad Hersfeld was the northernmost American border garrison and the first line of defense during the days of the Cold War. While small in numbers, the US forces were heavily equipped with a nuclear capability. They were primarily equipped with armored personnel carriers, artillery, and main battle tanks. They were augmented with combat engineers and an anti-aircraft missile site. However, they patrolled the Russian-American Demarcation Line in pairs of jeeps to avoid damage to the roads.

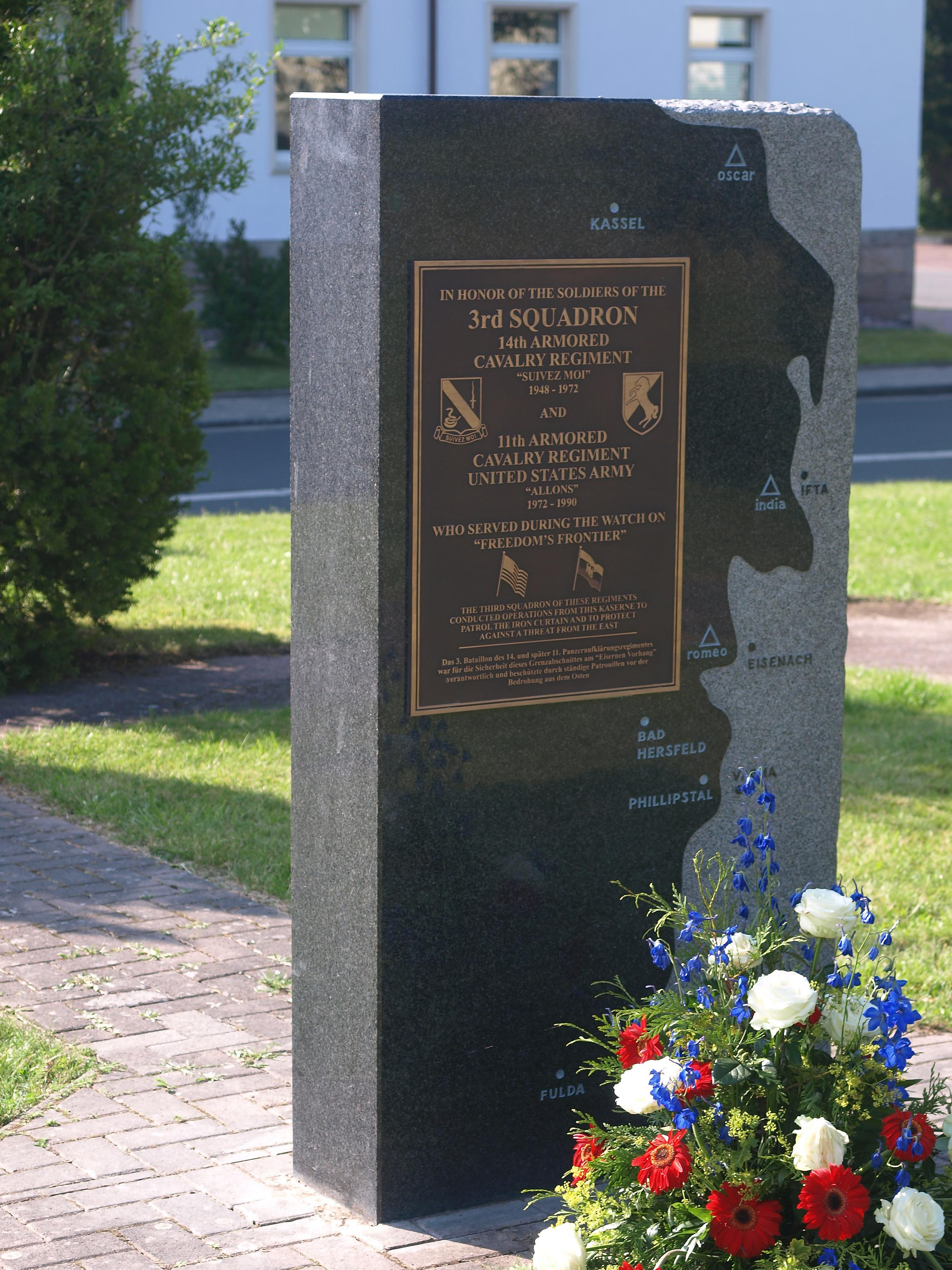
Memorial stone in the former McPheeters Barracks. It was erected in honor of the soldiers who did their military service in Bad Hersfeld.

Beginning in 1949, the town was called Bad Hersfeld, and as of 1963 it became a Hessian State Spa, which was municipalized in 2006. (Bad is German for "bath", and is a title given towns by state governments in recognition of their spa status).

In May 1983, 5,000 people in the town demonstrated against a reunion of soldiers from the Waffen-SS. Among the protest organizers were also the organizers of the Bad Hersfelder Festspiele.

=== Religion ===
The area of the town of Bad Hersfeld today belongs to the Evangelische Kirche von Kurhessen-Waldeck ("Protestant Church of the Electorate of Hesse-Waldeck", member of the Protestant Church in Germany), and the largely coextensive Catholic Bishopric of Fulda.

Besides the two big churches, various communities and free churches can be found in Bad Hersfeld, among them the State Church Community, the Protestant Free Church Community (Baptists), the Seventh Day Adventists and the Free Christian Community (Pentecostal).

Further religious communities in Bad Hersfeld are the New Apostolic Church and the Jehovah's Witnesses.

=== Amalgamations ===
In 1918, Kalkobes was amalgamated and in 1928 so was the area that later became the outlying centre od Johannesberg (Domäne Johannesberg und Bingartes). In 1972, the centres named above under "Constituent communities" were amalgamated. Moreover, the districts of Hersfeld and Rotenburg were merged into one new district, Hersfeld-Rotenburg, and Bad Hersfeld became its seat.

=== Population development ===
In 1525, 400 men lived in the town, and presumably this meant only householders – men with townsman's rights. Before the Thirty Years' War, in 1614, there were 725 households, putting the town's population at this time somewhere between 3,300 and 3,600. The town only reached this figure once again in the mid-18th century. The leftmost chart below shows the sharp drop in the town's population due to the Thirty Years' War.

After the Thirty Years' War, the population figure rose only slowly, falling back in the wake of many wars, disease outbreaks and famines. Only beginning in the mid-19th century, as the town was spreading outside to old town walls and as the textile and machine building industries were growing did the population figure rise sharply. Between 1910 and 1913, it surpassed 10,000 and after the Second World War, sometime between 1946 and 1950, it reached the 20,000 mark. After eleven villages were amalgamated in 1972, the population reached some 27,000, and sometime between 1987 and 1994, the town's population reached 30,000.

Given the population structure and the forecast migration to urban agglomerations, the HA Hessen Agentur GmbH foresees that the district's population will shrink by 6% by 2020. This fall is therefore also foreseen within the same timeframe for the town.

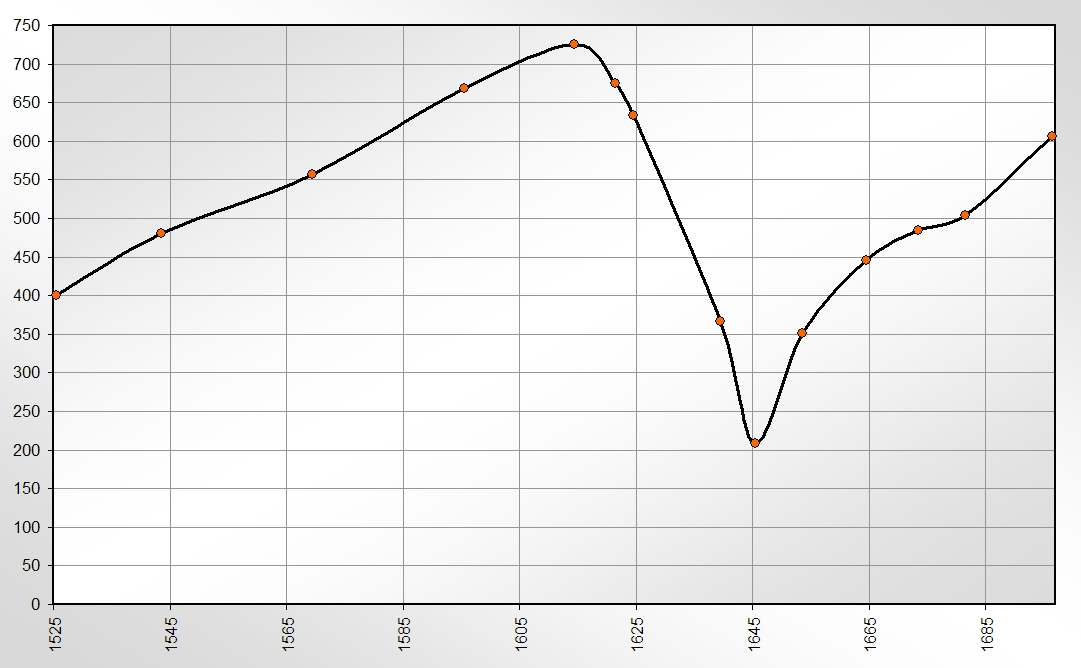
Number of free householders in Bad Hersfeld in the Middle Ages

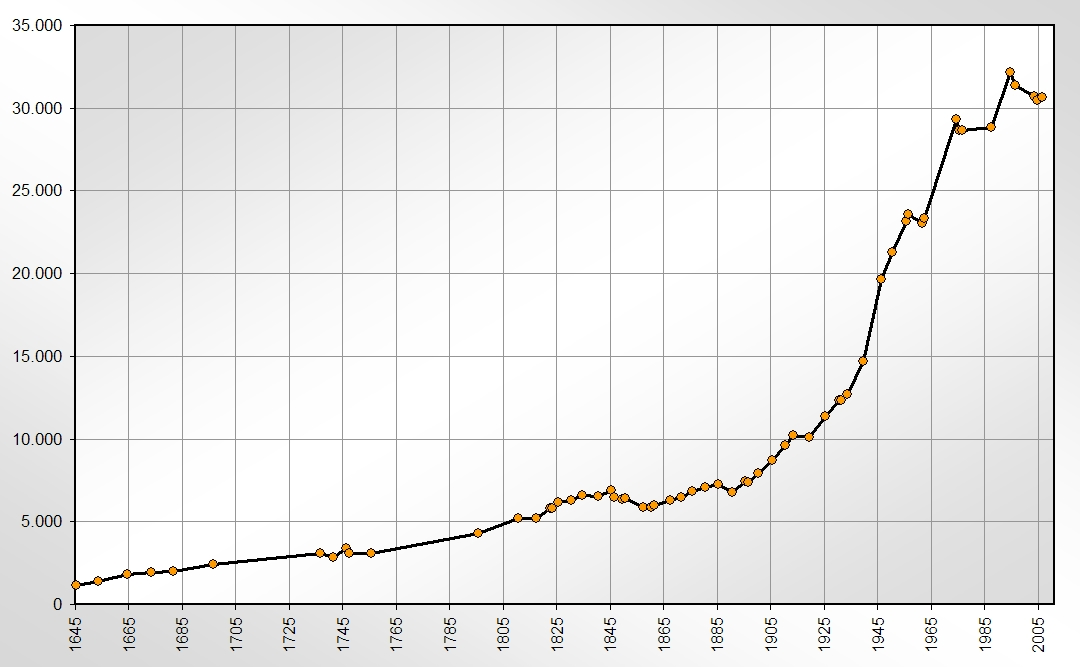
Population development since the Thirty Years' War

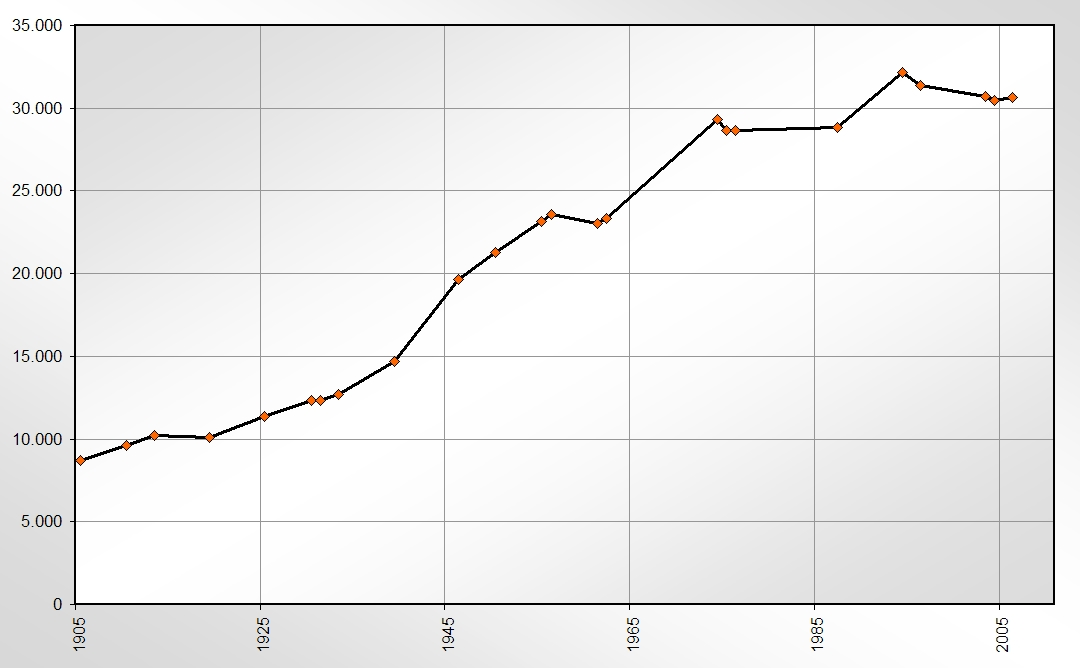
Population development over the last hundred years

== Politics ==
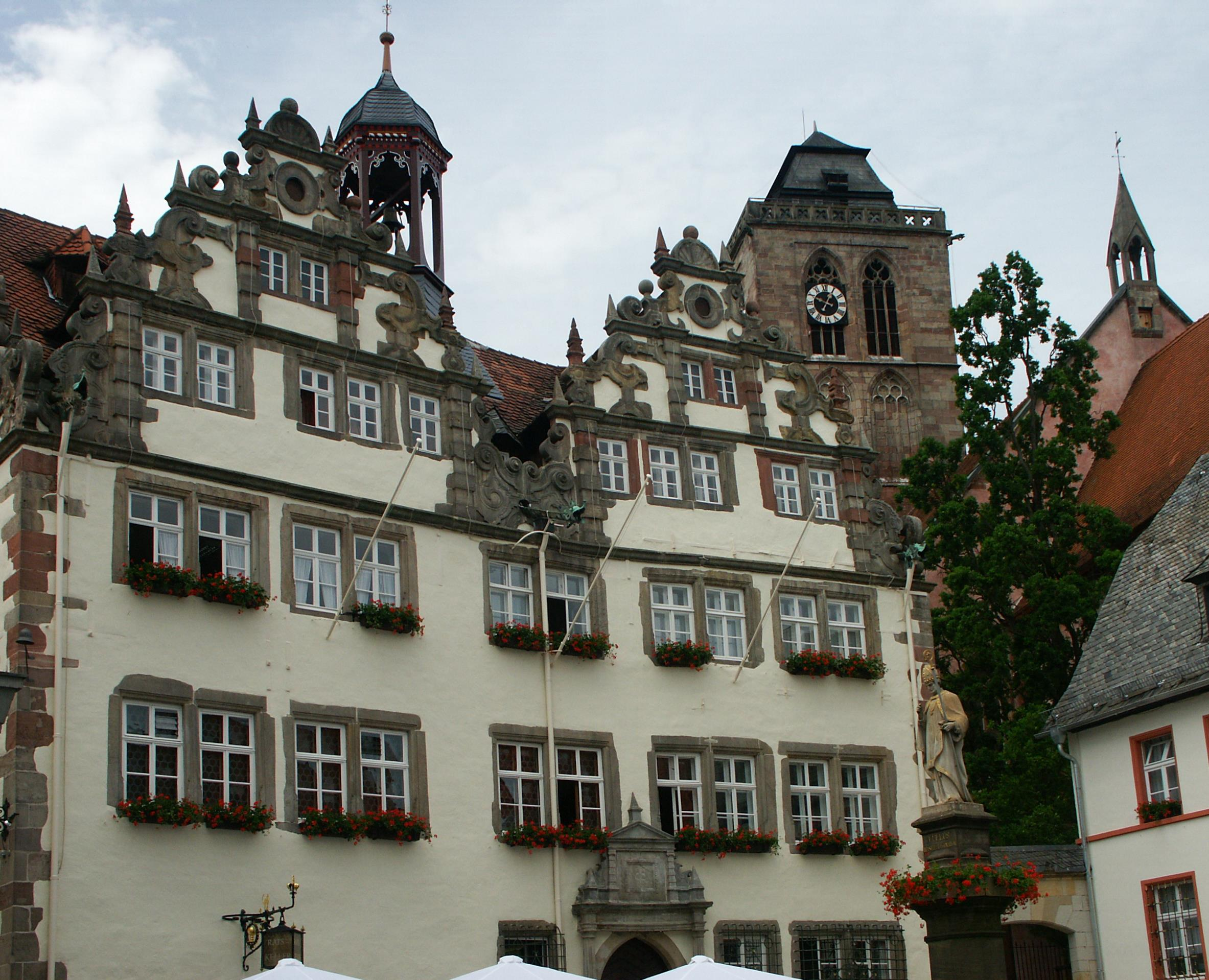
Bad Hersfeld's Town Hall

=== Town council ===
The municipal election held on 26 March 2006 yielded the following results:

Parties and voter communities		% 2006	Seats; 2006	% 2001	Seats; 2001
CDU	Christian Democratic Union of Germany	33.9	15	35.7	16
SPD	Social Democratic Party of Germany	47.7	22	48.1	22
GREENS	Bündnis 90/Die Grünen	3.0	1	6.0	3
FDP	Free Democratic Party	4.7	2	–	–
FWG	Freie Wählergemeinschaft Bad Hersfeld	3.4	2	7.1	3
BfH	Bürger für Hersfeld	2.5	1	3.1	1
independent	Unabhängige Wahlalternative Bad Hersfeld	3.8	2	–	–
DIE LINKE.	The Left	1.0	0	–	–
Total		100.0	45	100.0	45
Voter turnout in %		43.7		43.9	

The SPD and the FWG form one faction in the current election period.

The executive (Magistrat) is made up of 7 councillors and the mayor. Three seats are allotted to the SPD, two to the CDU and one each to the FDP and FWG.

=== Mayor ===
- Werner Hessemer: 1963-1977
- Hartmut Henning Boehmer: 1978-1989
- Walter Weiss: 1990-1996
- Hartmut Henning Boehmer: 1996-2010
- Thomas Fehling: 2011–2022
- Anke Hofmann: 2022–

=== Coat of arms ===
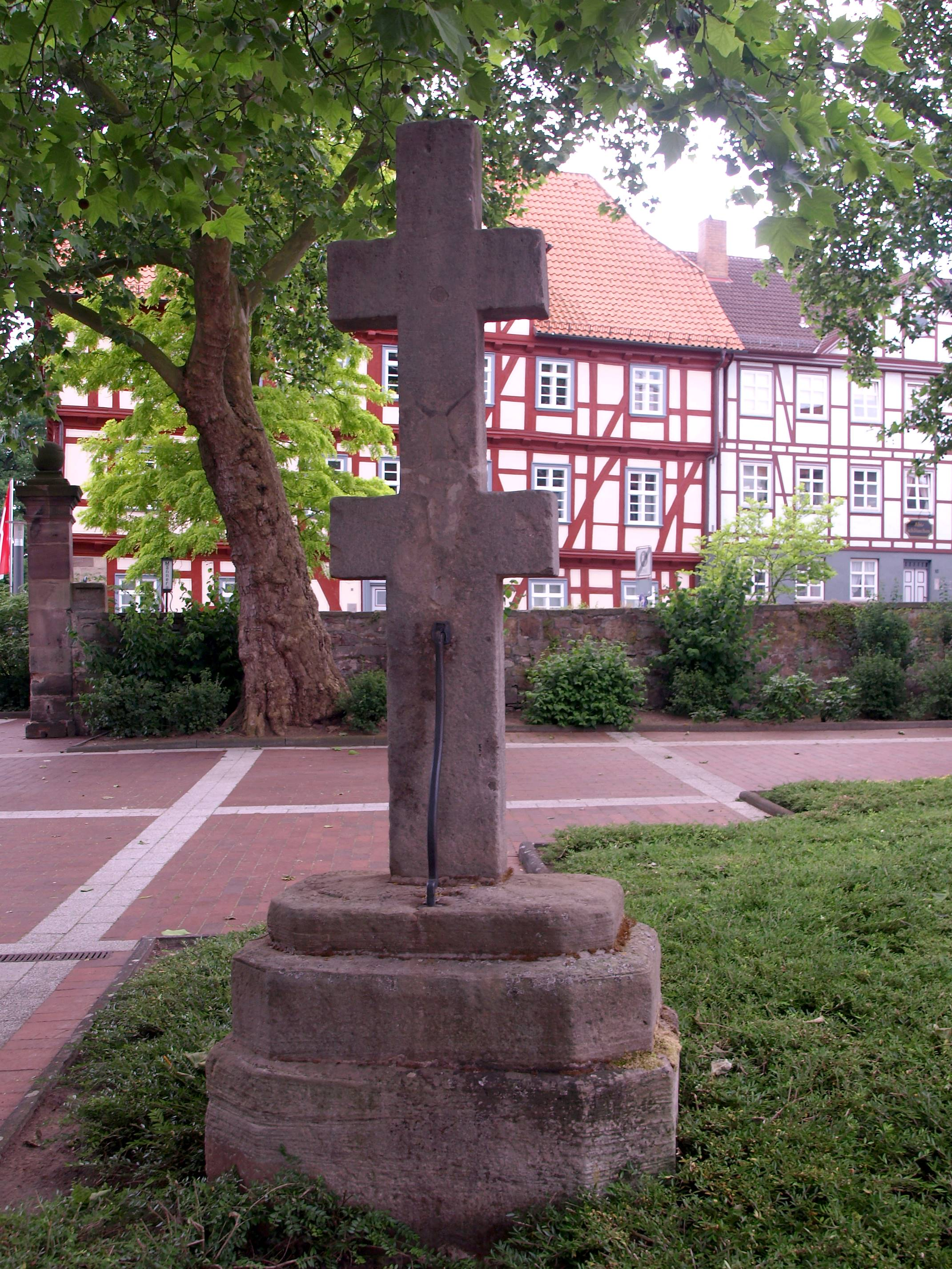
"Double cross", at the entrance within the town to the monastery zone

The town's arms might be described thus: Party per pale azure the Lion of Hesse sinister armed Or and royally crowned, argent a Cross of Lorraine pattée gules, the bottom arm fleury.

The arms used today have been borne since 1559. The "double cross" stems from the Benedictine abbey of Hersfeld. The Lion of Hesse appeared in the town's arms after the conquest in the Peasants’ War from Philip I, Landgrave of Hesse in 1525.

==== Older coats of arms ====
The oldest known town seal, from 1256, shows the patron saint Wigbert. The smaller seal from the 14th century shows the patron Simon the Zealot and Jude the Apostle of the Benedictine abbey of Hersfeld with the Wheel of Mainz and the double cross. In the Late Gothic town seal, this cross was the only charge. At Philip I's conquest, it was displaced by the Lion of Hesse.

A stylized double cross also appears in the Bad Hersfeld town logo designed in 2008. It is supposed to be used for marketing and the Internet.

=== Sponsorships ===
- Already by 1954, the town had undertaken a sponsorship for Sudeten Germans driven out of Šumperk – formerly Mährisch-Schönberg – in Moravia.
- A sponsorship with the German Navy Fast Attack Craft "S 75 Zobel" has existed since 1969.

== Culture and sightseeing ==
The town has since 1962 yearly awarded the Hersfeld-Preis to actors of the current festival season. Another honour awarded by the town is the Ulenroder Kruzifix, a cast taken of a bronze crucifix from the early 11th century that was found in the abandoned village of Ulenrode, which lay above Meckbach in what is now the community of Ludwigsau.

=== Theatre ===
Every summer, the Bad Hersfelder Festspiele (festival) are held. Outside the festival season, theatrical productions are given in the Stadthalle, an event venue.

=== Museums ===
The Bad Hersfeld Town Museum is housed in the only wing of the former monastery complex that is still preserved, south of the monastery ruins themselves. Besides the departments for town and monastery history, the department for town handicrafts is also worthy of mention.

In Konrad Duden’s memory is a small museum right next door to the former Old Monastery School (on the New Market). Here Duden was active from 1876 to 1905 as principal, which is why the school now bears his name.

The Haus Mährisch Schönberg shows a local history collection from the formerly German district of Landkreis Mährisch-Schönberg in what was the Sudetenland (on the New Market).

Since 2006 there has been a small savings bank museum at the main branch of the Sparkasse Bad Hersfeld-Rotenburg in which is displayed the history of the financial institution and the changes in the banking world in a great number of exhibits.

=== Buildings ===
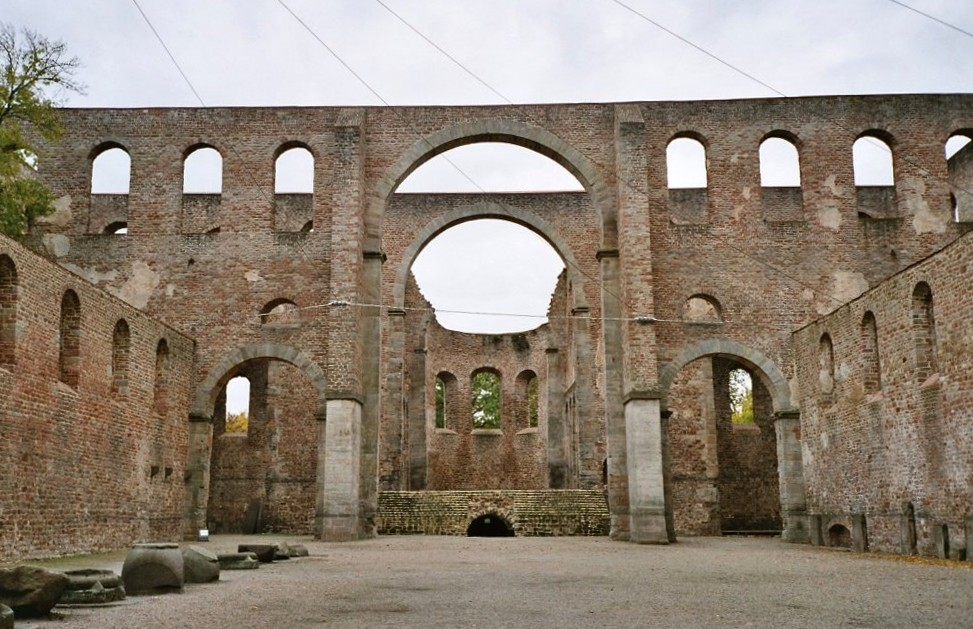
Monastery ruins in Bad Hersfeld

In the Old Town are 216 buildings under monumental protection. On the west side of the Old Town are found the monastery ruins. They are Europe’s biggest ecclesiastical ruin, and are now used as a venue for the Bad Hersfelder Festspiele. In the monastery zone stands the Katharinenturm (tower), in which hangs the Lullusglocke, Germany’s oldest dated bell (cast in 1038 AD). Furthermore, a wing of the cloister has been preserved (today a museum; chapter house preserved) and likewise great parts of the remnants of the town wall (South Gate, Halbschalenturm or "Half-Shell Tower"). The two Nordschulteiche (ponds) in the Leonhard Müller Complex are leftovers of the town moat. In this park is also found Saint Vitalis's Cross (the original can be seen in the museum). It stands on the spot where the townsmen fought off the attack by the Sternerbund in 1378. Further remnants of the town fortifications stand in the Lower Town (east side of the Old Town), among them the Klausturm (a watchtower and prison) and the somewhat smaller Pulverturm ("Powder Tower")

Furthermore, on Johannestor (a street) is found the Elisabeth-Hospital, endowed in 1239, with a Gothic chapel. Other Abbey buildings are the Schloss Eichhof and the ruins – the Bruderhaus – of the former Johannesberg provost's house. Both buildings lie some 3 km from the Old Town and can also be reached on foot from the spa park.

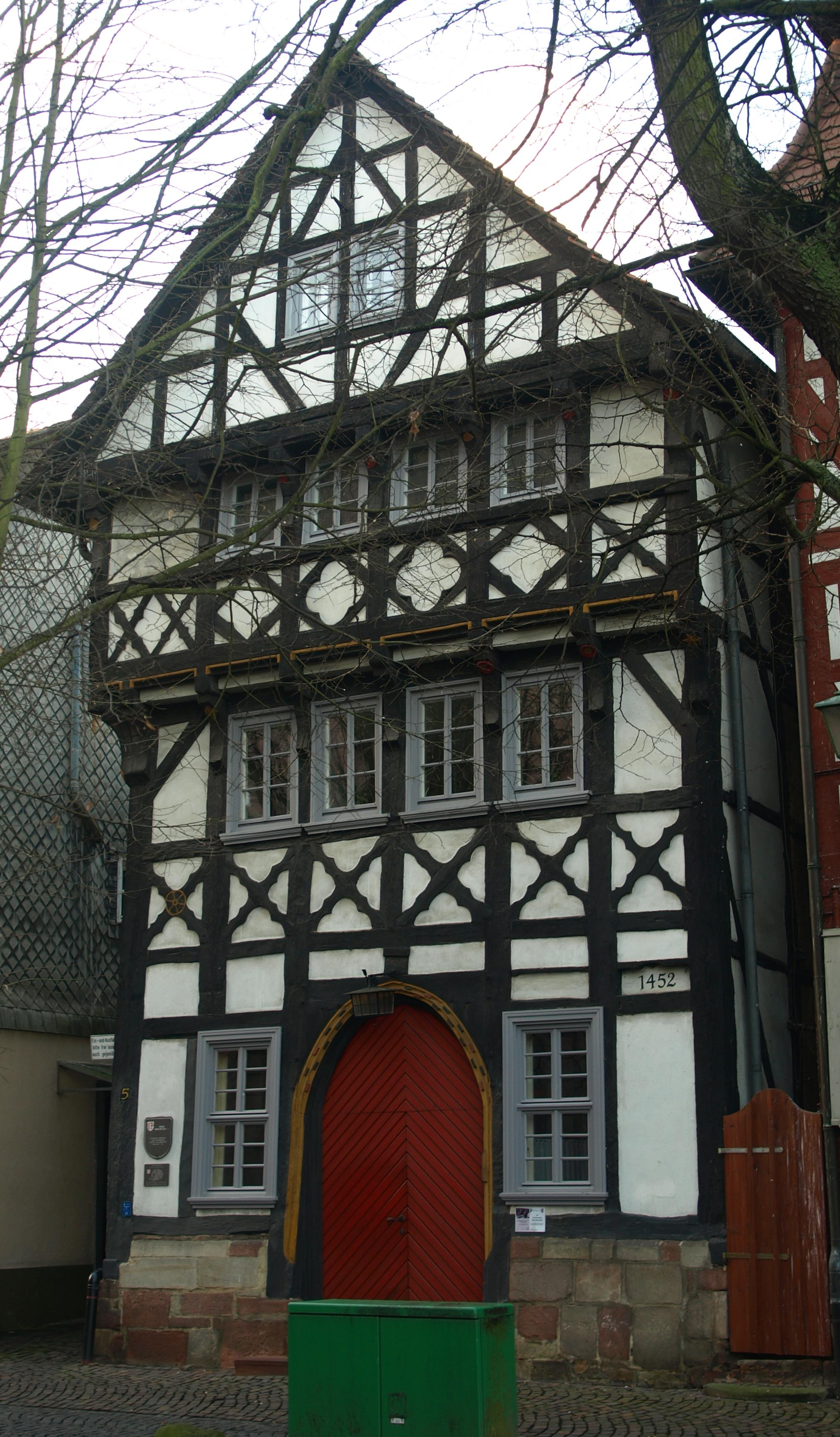
Oldest timber-frame house in Bad Hersfeld from 1452

In the centre of Bad Hersfeld's Old Town stands the Gothic Stadtkirche ("Town Church") whose 14th-century tower is the town's landmark. On the church square stands a continuous row of timber-frame buildings, among them the former Küsterhaus (sexton's house), which is the town's oldest timber-frame house, built in 1452. Right next to this stands the Town Hall, which was built about 1371 in the Gothic style and remodelled and expanded between 1607 and 1612 in the Weser Renaissance style. Further timber-frame houses are to be found throughout the pedestrian precinct. Particularly worthy of mention here is the richly decorated Zimmermannshaus ("Carpenter’s House") on Klausstraße.

On Linggplatz, the Abbey's old court square (old stone "double cross"), a statue recalls Baden Lieutenant Colonel Johann Baptist Lingg von Linggenfeld, who saved the town from being burnt down by Napoleonic troops in 1807. Beside this lies the marketplace on which patrician houses from Gothic times stand, among them the old mint. They were remodelled in the Renaissance and bear witness, with their gables like the timber-frame houses across the street, to the monastery's last building boom. On the Neumarkt ("New Market") stands, besides the other timber-frame houses, the Linggklause (Lieutenant Colonel Lingg's dwelling). Here, too, are the old monastery school (nowadays the Konrad-Duden-Schule) and the Konrad Duden Museum.

=== Parks ===
The biggest park in town is the Kurpark, or spa park (some 6.5 ha) with the Kurhaus (spa house), the pump room and the spring pavilion. Right near the Old Town is found the Leonardt-Müller-Anlage (park), along the town wall, with the two Nordschulteiche (ponds). In the monastery zone is another park, which in 2006 was expanded with a perennial plant garden. Both the spa park and the Leonardt-Müller-Anlage were remodelled between 2006 and 2007.

Further greenspaces are the 15-hectare Fuldapark with its Fuldasee (lake) and the Carl-Strauß-Anlage on the Kleinshöhe (heights) on the Tageberg.

=== Sport ===
- Besides the football clubs in many centres, there is the SVA Bad Hersfeld club, which with its first team is playing in the Fußball-Verbandsliga Hessen Nord in the 2008/2009 season. The second team plays in the Bezirksliga Fulda Nord, and the A-Juniors belong, for the third year now, to the Hyundai Oberliga Hessen. Further ball sports are played at the Turnverein Hersfeld 1848 e. V. (gymnastic club). Among others, there are team handball, volleyball and basketball.
- The team of the SG Hessen Hersfeld played from the 1997/1998 season until the 2002/2003 season in the women's Handball-Bundesliga.
- The three rowing and canoe clubs, Hersfelder Kanu-Club 1924 e. V., Kanu-Wanderer Hersfeld 1986 e. V. and Hersfelder Ruderverein 1977 e. V. carry out their activity in the summer, mainly on the Fulda. The last-named club also engages in competitive rowing.
- Besides the shooting clubs in almost every outlying centre, there is also the Hersfelder Schützengilde ("Marksmen’s Guild") 1252 e. V. It is one of Germany's oldest still-active clubs.
- The Luftsportverein Bad Hersfeld e. V. (air sports) has its glider facility on the Langenberg near Hattenbach (a constituent community of Niederaula).
- the famous "Zu-Null-Bickel" lives in Bad Hersfeld.

=== Regular events ===
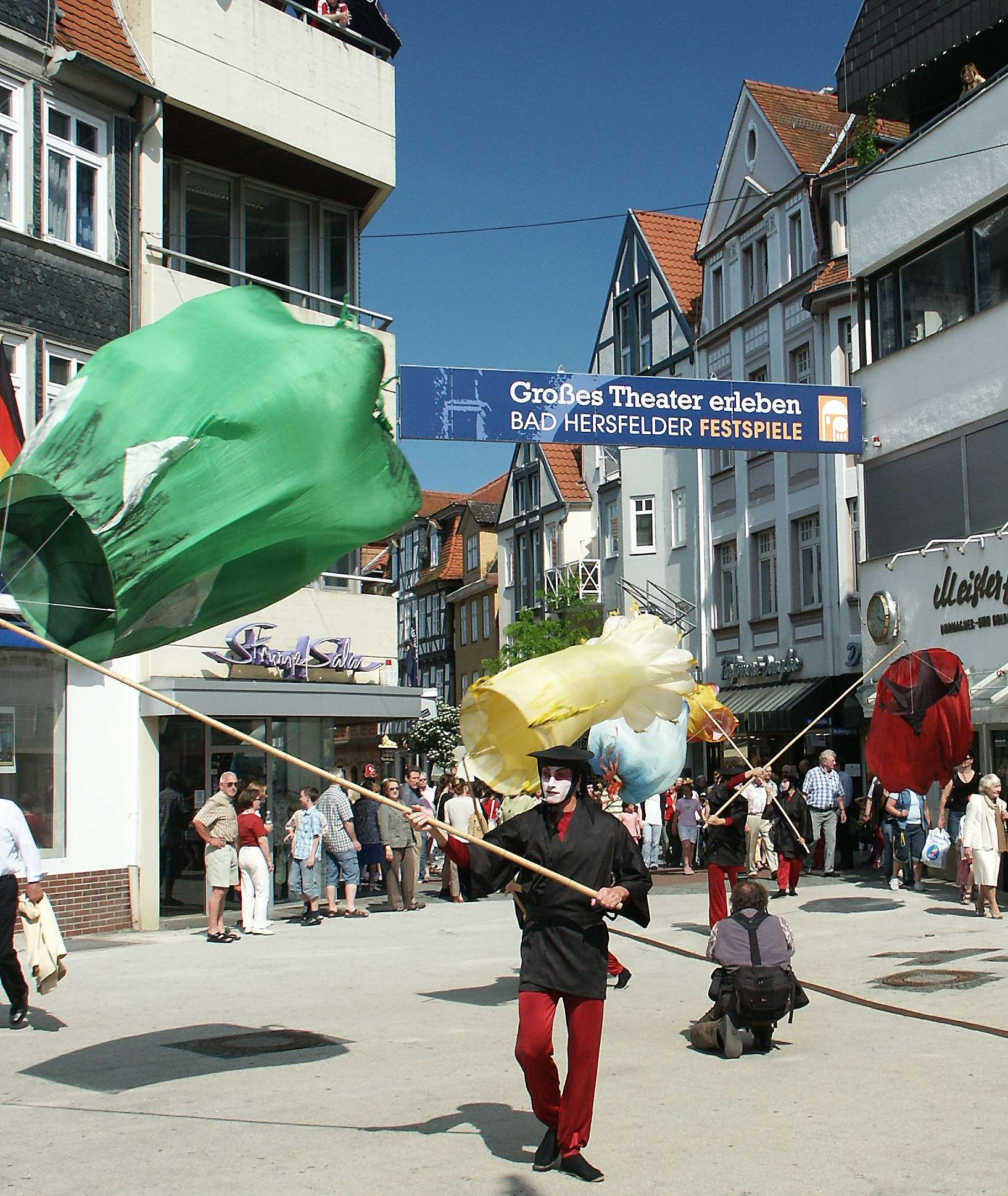
Opening of the Bad Hersfelder Festspiele

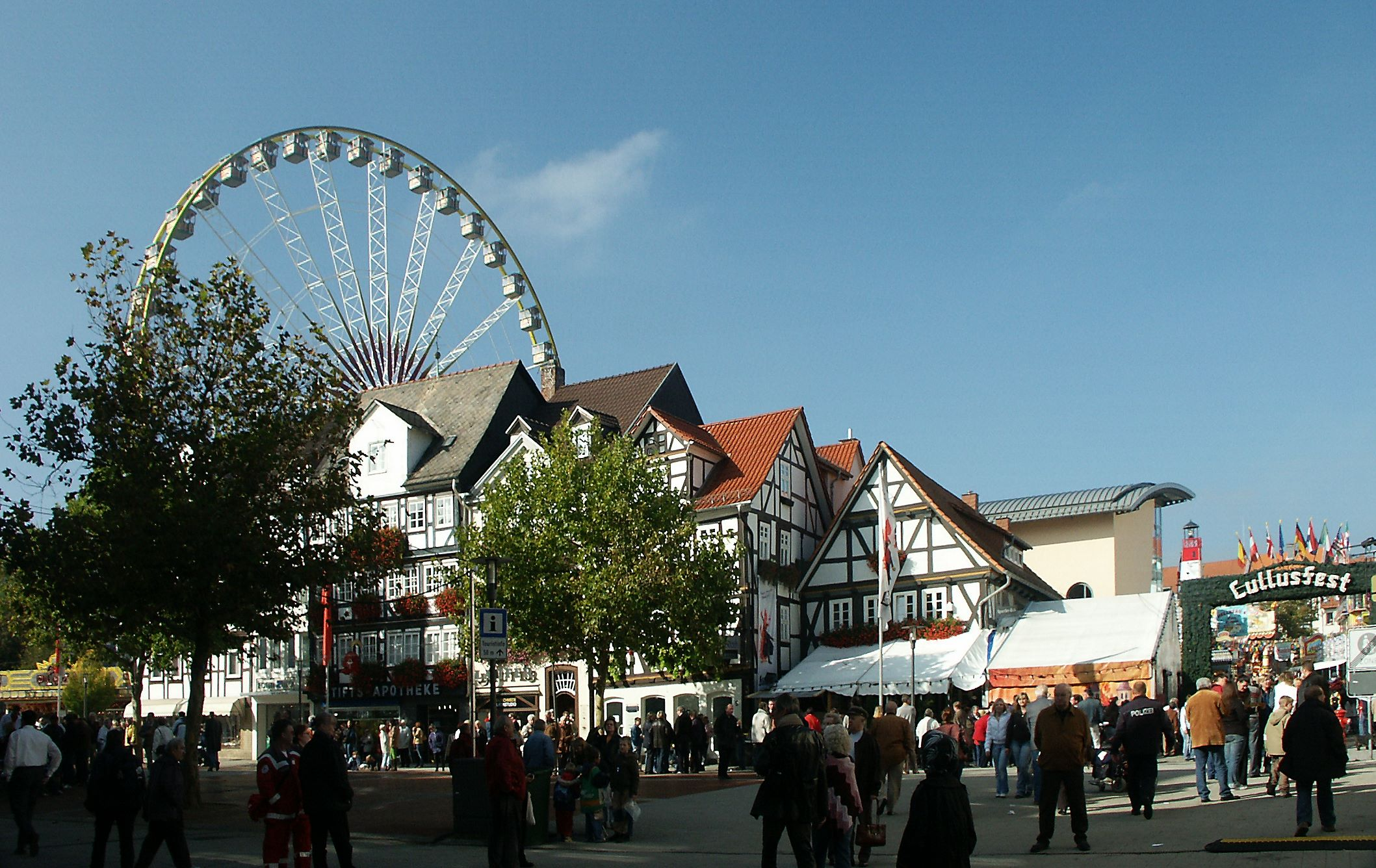
Lullusfest

Nationally known are the yearly Bad Hersfelder Festspiele, opera festival and the festival concerts. They are held between June and August in the monastery ruins. Other great musical events for every taste is the Bad Hersfeld Bach Days event (every year at Easter at the Johann-Sebastian-Bach-Haus), the Live-Jazz-Festival (every year on the first weekend in June on stages throughout the Old Town), the StadtJugendNacht ("Town Youth Night"; yearly on the first Saturday in September under the Peterstorbrücke [bridge]) and the Metalfest (late every year).

The Lullusfest is known for being Germany's oldest folk festival. It is held every year in the week in which 16 October falls. Other greater folk festivals are the shooting festival of the marksmen's guild in the Jägersgraben and the Tagebergfest of the volunteer fire brigade (an outdoor forest festival).

Among sporting events that can be named are the Sauer Lollslauf, a marathon run on the occasion of the Lullusfest, and the Internationale Bad Hersfelder DMV-Grasbahnrennen held each summer by the Motorsportclub Bad Hersfeld e. V. on a 500 m-long track.

Most markets in town are held on Linggplatz. The weekly market is held twice a week and a flea market takes place from April to October on the first Saturday of each month. Other, yearly, markets are the Easter Market on Wednesday before Good Friday, the Whitsun Market on Wednesday before Whitsunday, the Große Lulluskrammarkt ("Great Lullus Traders’ Market") on Wednesday during Lullusfest and the Autumn Market on Penance Day, the Wednesday before 23 November (this day is known in Germany as Buß- und Bettag, an Evangelical observance).

== Economy and infrastructure ==
Since German reunification Bad Hersfeld has lain in the middle of Germany, favourably located on the A 4 and the A 7, leading the region to develop into a stronghold for logistics firms.

The town appears in Hesse's state development plan as a middle centre partly functioning as a higher centre. The town maintains a large volunteer fire brigade, which sometimes sees service elsewhere in Germany.

=== Transport ===
==== Highway ====
The north–south Autobahnen A 5 (Hattenbach–Basel) and A 7 (Flensburg–Füssen) meet the east-west Autobahn A 4 (Aachen–Görlitz) at the Kirchheim and Hattenbach three-leg interchanges.

Moreover, the north–south Bundesstraße 27 (from the Harz to Lake Constance) and the east–west Bundesstraße 62 (from Marburg to Bad Salzungen) play an important role. Bundesstraße 324 serves as an Autobahn feeder to the A 7. All three Bundesstraßen meet each other in Bad Hersfeld.

==== Railway ====
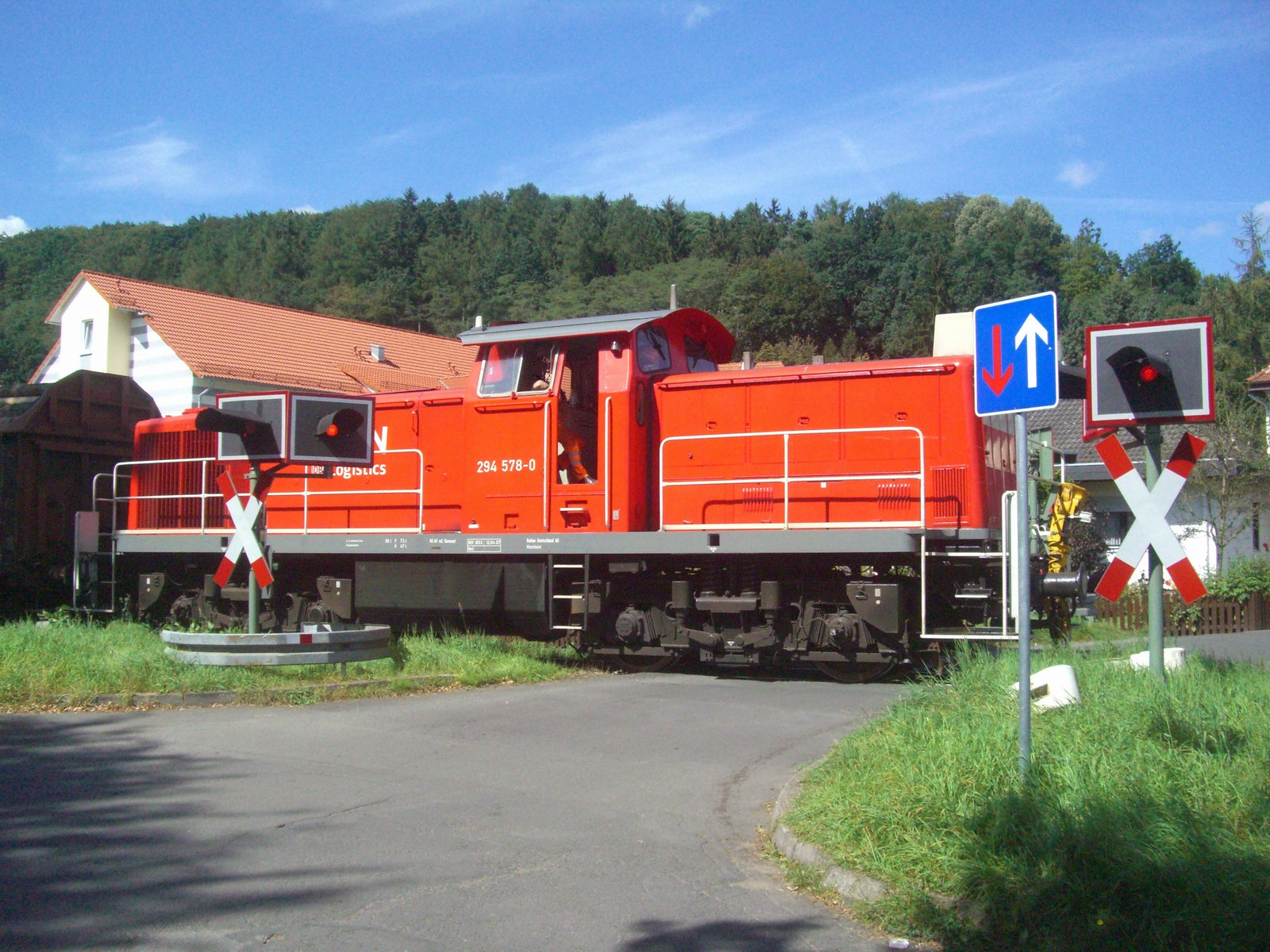
A railway crossing at the Kurpark on the Knüllwaldbahn, nowadays only used for goods services

Bad Hersfeld lies on the Kassel–Bebra–Fulda railway line. There is an ICE connection every two hours from Frankfurt am Main by way of Fulda to Eisenach–Erfurt–Weimar–Leipzig–Berlin/Dresden. Regional trains run to, among other places, Kassel and Göttingen. Just behind Hersfeld railway station, the Knüllwaldbahn branches off.

==== Local public transport ====
The local public transport is run by the Nordhessischer Verkehrsverbund ("North Hesse Transport Association", NVV). The nine town and four intercity bus routes are run by Überlandwerk Fulda AG (ÜWAG Bus GmbH).

The Hersfelder Kreisbahn run by the Hersfelder Eisenbahngesellschaft, a local railway line running from Bad Hersfeld to Philippsthal – roughly 11 km – was abandoned in 1993, and the stretch as far as Schenklengsfeld has been converted into a cycling path.

==== Air transport ====
The Flugplatz Johannesberg has the status of Special Airfield. The runway, some 671 m long and 18 m wide, is paved with asphalt and oriented in a north–south direction. The airfield lies on the Johannesberg in the like-named outlying centre at an elevation of 284 m above sea level.

The airfield was built by the United States Army between 1952 and 1953 and belonged to McPheeter Barracks in the outlying centre of Hohe Luft. It was known at that time as US Army Airfield Werve-Thompson. When the US Army pulled out in 1993, the airfield was taken over by Motor-Flieger-Club e. V. Bad Hersfeld.

=== Established businesses ===
Among businesses in the oldest field of endeavour in Bad Hersfeld, textile manufacturing, is the firm Performance Fibers (formerly the Hoechst works, which makes high-strength polyester fibres. Further long-established family businesses are the mineral oil dealer and operator of the LOMO filling stations Lorenz Mohr GmbH & Co. KG and the building firm Kirchner Holding GmbH. Working in the field of electronics are EMS (Electronic Manufacturing Services) service provider EN ElectronicNetwork Hersfeld GmbH (formerly Zuse KG, later Siemens AG, and KRONE Kommunikationstechnik GmbH) and Thales e-Transactions GmbH. In the field of machine building and process engineering, the firms Grenzebach BSH GmbH (in Schilde AG's old buildings), Linde Ladenbau GmbH & Co. KG and TLT Turbo GmbH (since 2006 owned by Siemens AG) can be named. The logistics field settled here for the most part only after German reunification. After amazon.de and Libri, a book wholesaling firm, came the logistics firm RS Components, setting up its European hub in Bad Hersfeld.

A further important economic factor is the hospital establishment, which in part also supports the spa operations. The following hospitals and clinics are to be found in town: the Klinikum Bad Hersfeld and the Krankenhaus St. Elisabeth Bad Hersfeld, which are active mainly in general medicine, and the spa clinics Klinik im Kurpark (clinic for psychosomatic medicine and orthopaedics), Fachklinik Wigbertshöhe (clinic for sociopsychosomatic illnesses), Klinik am Hainberg (clinic for psychosomatic medicine and psychotherapy), Vitalisklinik (clinic for digestive and metabolic disorders) and the Orthopädische Akutklinik.

The biggest bank in town is the Sparkasse Bad Hersfeld-Rotenburg.

=== Music ===
Each year after the Festspiele, an opera festival is held in the monastery ruins. Even during the time of the Festspiele, though, the Arbeitskreis für Musik e. V. ("music workshop") has staged the Bad Hersfelder Festspielkonzerte in the monastery ruins, in the Stadthalle and at Johann-Sebastian-Bach-Haus since 1961. Furthermore, seasonal concerts are held the year round in the Stadthalle and at Johann-Sebastian-Bach-Haus. Among them are the Internationale Bachtage in Hessen und Thüringen at which each year during Holy Week and at Easter great choral works and chamber music extravaganzas are produced.

Each year on the first weekend in June is the jazz festival. National and international stars as well as groups from the town itself visit the town the whole weekend from morning until late evening with swing, beat and blues. For many years this festival has been a yearly highlight, widely drawing many visitors.

In autumn, the yearly Cross Music Metalfest is held, at which many hard rock and metal bands from all over the world appear. It is always held on the first weekend in October and draws visitors from all over Europe.

=== Media ===
The local daily newspaper is the Hersfelder Zeitung (founded in 1763) and the twice weekly advertising flier Kreisanzeiger has been distributed free since 1980. Both papers have belonged to the publishing business Dirk Ippen. Competition comes from an independent advertising flier published since August 2008, the Express Waldhessen. Since several months the "Express Waldhessen" has a new name. It's called "Klartext". In addition sind 2004 there is another small Newspaper made by Bodo Neumann. It's called: "EXTRABLATT" which will be free distributed every 14 days.

Since 1 May 2008, FunRadio Hersfeld has been broadcasting from the town.

=== Public institutions ===
Besides the customary institutions usually found in a district seat, and those already described under "Culture and sightseeing", there are the Stadthalle (literally "town hall", but actually an event venue, not connected at all with the town's administration; "town hall" is Rathaus in German), the book café (sponsor: Verein für Kultur und Kommunikation e. V.) and the Konrad-Duden-Stadtbibliothek (town library). This was opened in March 1999 on the marketplace in Bad Hersfeld. The public library has a total floor area of some 1 000 m^{2}. On 31 December 2007, it had an inventory of some 65,000 media, and yearly media borrowings amount to 210,000.

In the field of sport, there are two baths, the Aqua Fit (sport and family bath) and the Kurbad Therme (wellness bath) at the spa park. Moreover, there is the heated swimming pool Geistalbad. Many other sports can be pursued at the Jahn-Park (sport and leisure centre), the Nordic-Walking-Park and the sport and tennis grounds in Bad Hersfeld.

==== Spa operations ====
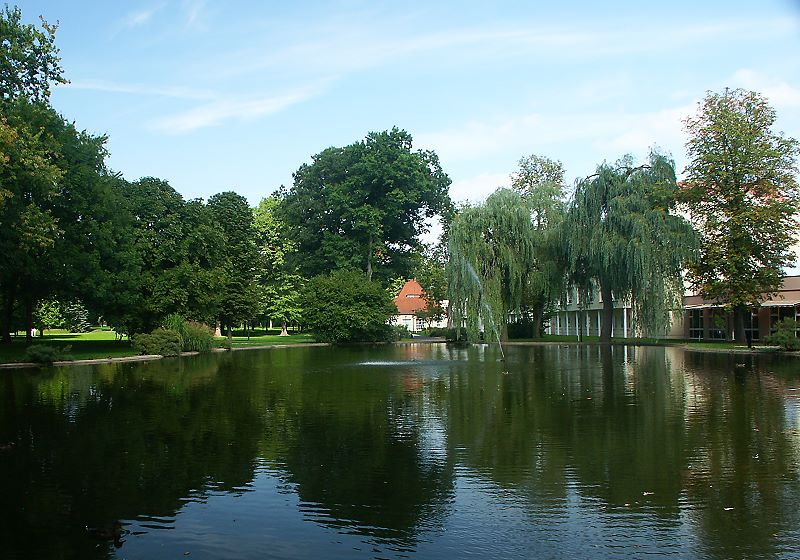
Bad Hersfeld's Kurpark ("spa park")

In Bad Hersfeld are two mineral springs. The Lullusquelle was newly bored in 1904. It was documented as early as 1518, but was overwhelmed in a flood in the 17th century. The Vitalisbrunnen was bored in 1949. The water is heavy with Glauber's salt. Bottled mineral water has also been available since 2006 under the name Naturquellen Bad Hersfeld.

The spa operations therefore primarily entail drinking and bathing treatments, which are used to deal with liver, gall bladder, stomach, intestinal and metabolic illnesses, as well as psychosomatic illnesses, musculoskeletal illnesses and rheumatic disorders. After spa privatization failed in 2005, the town once again took charge of the administration.

==== Youth ====
Besides the various football and sport clubs, youths also have a chance to meet each other after school in one of Bad Hersfeld's supervised institutions for fostering the town's youth. One possible choice is the Jugendhaus Bad Hersfeld on Dippelstraße, which is popular among youth mainly for its many events.

=== Education ===
In Bad Hersfeld are three comprehensive schools, Gesamtschule Geistal, Gesamtschule Obersberg and Konrad-Duden-Schule, the last-named of which was founded in 1570 by Abbot Michael of the Hersfeld Abbey as a monastery school. From 1876 to 1905, Konrad Duden was the principal at the then Königliches Gymnasium zu Hersfeld, which was named in his honour in 1980.

The pilot school Modellschule Obersberg offers a Gymnasium-type upper level.

Furthermore, there are six primary schools, Ernst-von-Harnack-Schule, Grundschule An der Sommerseite, Grundschule Sorga, Kolibri-Grundschule, Linggschule und Wilhelm-Neuhaus-Schule. There is also a special school, Friedrich-Fröbel-Schule.

Also, there are three vocational schools, Berufliche Schulen des Landkreises Hersfeld-Rotenburg (Europaschule), Berufsbildungszentrum Metall and Bildungszentrum für Handel und Dienstleistung.

Further training and higher education is to be had at the Studienakademie für Logistik (department of the Berufsakademie Nordhessen), the evening school for adults, the Academy of the DGUV (Deutsche Gesetzliche Unfallversicherung, or "German Legal Accident Insurance"), the Deutsche Angestellten Akademie, the Evangelische Jugendbildungsstätte Frauenberg ("Evangelical Youth Education Centre", sponsored by the Evangelical Church of Electoral Hesse-Waldeck), the district folk high school and the Hersfeld-Rotenburg district music school.

== Twin towns – sister cities ==
Bad Hersfeld is twinned with:

- Bad Salzungen, Germany (1990)
- L'Haÿ-les-Roses, France (1994)
- Šumperk, Czech Republic (1979)

== Notable people ==
This list, arranged by birthdate, contains people who were born in Bad Hersfeld as well as some who worked, but were not born, here. The list is by no means complete.

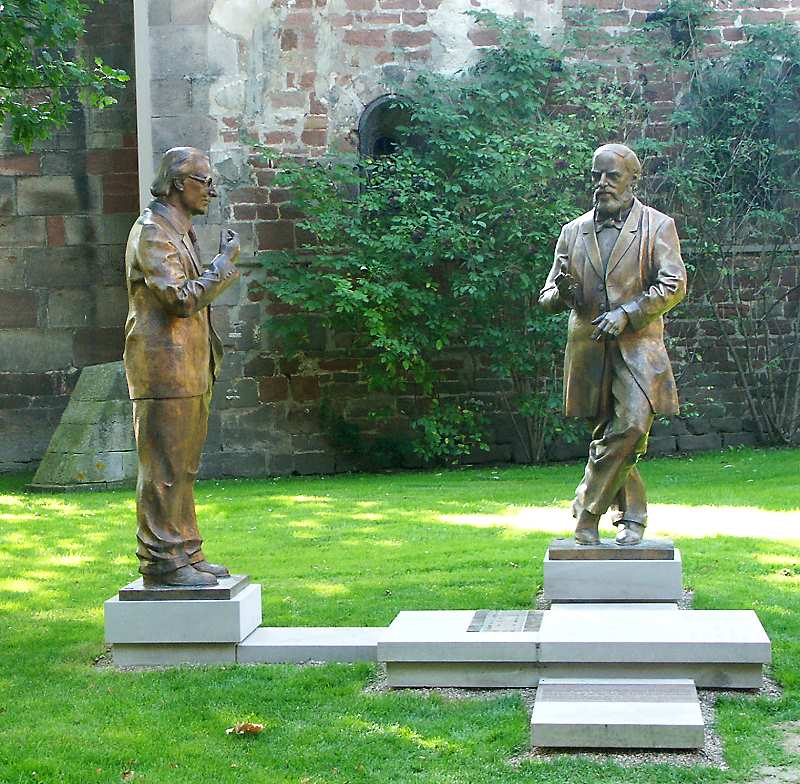
Statue of Konrad Duden and Konrad Zuse in the monastery zone

- Lullus (about 710–786), first regular Archbishop of Mainz and first abbot of the Hersfeld monastery
- Lampert von Hersfeld (c. 1028 – c. 1085), chronicler and abbot
- Friedrich Risner (c. 1533–1580), mathematician
- Heinrich Gutberleth (1572–1635), educator
- Johann Baptist Lingg von Linggenfeld (1765–1842), lieutenant general
- Wilhelm Valentin Volckmar (born 1812), composer
- Konrad Duden (1829–1911), from 1876 to 1905 principal of the Royal Hersfeld Gymnasium
- Karl Franz Wilhelm Schimmelpfeng (1841–1913), founder of the Auskunftei Schimmelpfeng
- Benno Schilde (1849–1911), inventor and founder of the Schilde AG machine building company
- Fritz Rechberg (1868–1939), entrepreneur and Kommerzienrat
- Michael Schnabrich (1880–1939), was town councillor and Member of the Reichstag for Hersfeld from 1924 to 1933, was murdered by the Nazis at Sachsenhausen concentration camp
- Max Becker (1888–1960), German politician and an initiator of the Bad Hersfelder Festspiele
- Johannes Klein (1897–1976), was founder of the Bad Hersfelder Festspiele and their first artistic director
- Konrad Zuse (1910–1995), German computer pioneer, moved his firm's headquarters to Bad Hersfeld in 1957
- William Zinkewich (born 1946), former business executive at Massey Ferguson, Varity Corporation, Massey Combines, Ontario Bus Industries and SSAB.
- Detlef Altenburg (born 1947), was a musicologist
- Reinhard Schmidt-Rost (born 1949), in Bad Hersfeld) is an Evangelical clergyman, psychologist and college teacher in practical theology at the Rheinischen Friedrich-Wilhelms-Universität Bonn
- Helmut Balzert (born 1950), holder of the chair for software engineering in the Faculty of Electrical Engineering and Information Technology at the Ruhr University Bochum
- Heinrich Fischer (born 1951), brigadier general of the Bundeswehr
- Manfred Gruber (born 1951), well known artist (painting, graphic arts and scenic design) and was from 1978 to 1987/1988 head of decoration and chief scenic designer at the Bad Hersfelder Festspiele
- Uwe Bein (born 1960), professional footballer, world champion 1990, Kids instructor at soccer schools and at the SVA Bad Hersfeld. Formerly also manager at Kickers Offenbach
- Jonathan Nichols (born 1965), Oklahoma state senator
- Werner L. Maier (born 1966), lawyer and president of the Munich Cowboys
- Dirk Müller (born 1973), active German bicycle racer, 2006 German Road Champion
- D.L. Lang (born 1983), Poet laureate of Vallejo, California
- Sheila Gaff (born 1989), international Mixed Martial Artist
- Shkodran Mustafi (born 1992), professional footballer, world champion 2014

=== Honorary citizens ===
- Leonhard Müller (1799–1878),

the Electorate of Hesse land and road building master
Honoured in 1834
He undertook the first measures to preserve the Bad Hersfeld monastery ruins, designed the Luisenschule and many other buildings in town.

- Dr. Wilhelm Münscher (1795–1872),

Gymnasium principal in Hersfeld from 1832 to 1867
Honoured in 1857

- Wilhelm Neuhaus (1873–1956),

Teacher and vice-principal at the Evangelical elementary school (former Nordschule, today Fröbelschule) and later at the Südschule (it has borne his name since 1962), Heimatforscher ("homeland researcher")
Honoured in 1948

- Nils Bickel known as "Zu-Null-Bickel"
- Björn Schlensog
