= Kirchheim, Hesse =

Kirchheim
- Municipality
- Coat of arms

- Location of Kirchheim within Hersfeld-Rotenburg district
- Interactive map of Kirchheim
- Location within Germany Location within Hesse
- Coordinates: 50°50′27″N 9°34′28″E
- Country: Germany
- State: Hesse
- Admin. region: Kassel
- District: Hersfeld-Rotenburg
- Subdivisions: 12 districts

Government
  - Mayor (2022–28): Axel Schmidt (CDU)

Area
  - Total: 50.61 km^{2} (19.54 sq mi)
- Elevation: 244 m (801 ft)

Population (2025-12-31)
  - Total: 3,606
  - Density: 71.25/km^{2} (184.5/sq mi)
- Time zone: UTC+01:00 (CET)
  - Summer (DST): UTC+02:00 (CEST)
- Postal codes: 36275
- Dialling codes: 06625, 06628
- Vehicle registration: HEF
- Website: www.kirchheim.de

Kirchheim (German pronunciation: [ˈkɪʁçhaɪm]) is a municipality in Hersfeld-Rotenburg district in northeastern Hesse, Germany.

== Geography ==
=== Location ===
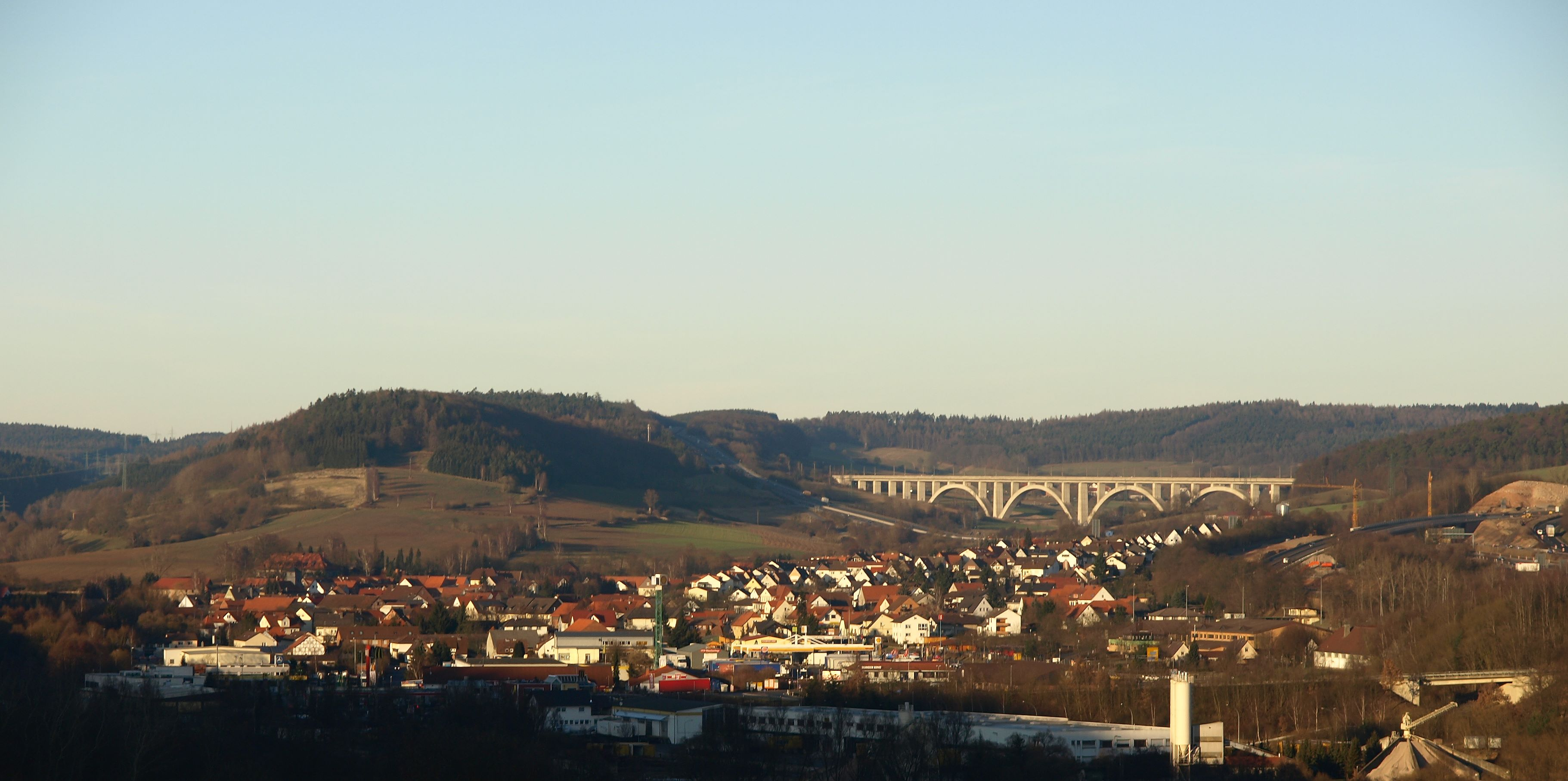
Kircheim with the A 7 and the Wälsebach valley bridge in the background

The community lies on the south slope of the Knüllgebirge (range) in the valley of the brook Ibra and the Aula, which empties into the Fulda near Niederaula. The local mountain is the 636 m-high Eisenberg.

The nearest major towns and cities are Bad Hersfeld (some 10 km to the east), Fulda (some 34 km (21 mi) to the south) and Alsfeld (some 24 km (15 mi) to the west). Kassel lies 54 km (34 mi) to the north.

=== Neighbouring communities ===
Kirchheim borders in the north on the community of Neuenstein, in the east on the town of Bad Hersfeld, in the south on the community of Niederaula, in the southwest on the community of Breitenbach am Herzberg (all in Hersfeld-Rotenburg) and in the west on the community of Oberaula (in the Schwalm-Eder-Kreis).

=== Constituent communities ===
Kirchheim's Ortsteile, besides the main centre, also called Kirchheim, are Allendorf, Frielingen, Gersdorf, Gershausen, Goßmannsrode, Heddersdorf, Kemmerode, Reckerode, Reimboldshausen, Rotterterode and Willingshain.

=== Climate ===
The mean yearly air temperature is 7.4 °C (45.3 °F) and the average precipitation is 637 mm (25.1 in). On average each year, Kirchheim has 21.7 “summer days” (in which the daily high reaches 25 °C (77 °F) or higher) and 107.2 “frost days” (in which the temperature dips down below 0 °C (32 °F)). The average yearly duration of sunshine is 1,410 hours.

Source: 1200 Jahre Kirchheim, see “Further reading”

== History ==
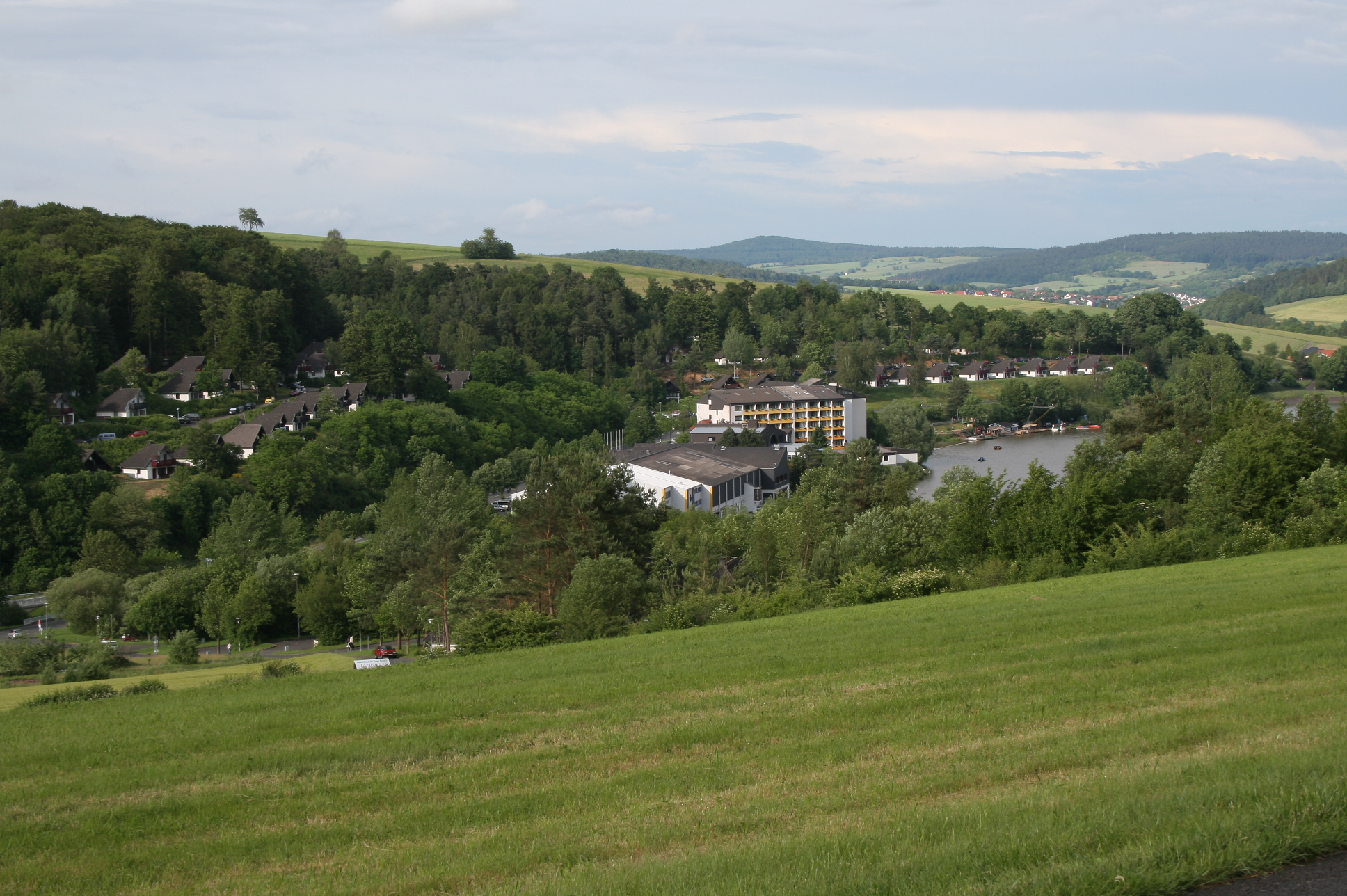
View of the “Seepark Kirchheim”

About 810, Kirchheim had its first documentary mention in the Breviarium Sancti Lulli (“Saint Lullus’s Summary”), a tithe directory kept by the Hersfeld Abbey, under the name Kyricheim.

Kirchheim was linked to the railway on 1 May 1906 when the Knüllwaldbahn (Bad Hersfeld–Treysa) was opened. From 1935, the community also had a link to the Autobahn network when the three-way junction of the A 7 (Flensburg–Füssen) and A 4 (Aachen–Görlitz) was built here.

In 1974, building work began on the Seepark Kirchheim between the outlying centres of Reimboldshausen and Kemmerode. The Ibra was dammed up here to form a 10 ha lake. Only a year later, district road (Kreisstraße) 34 from Willingshain by way of the Eisenberg to Raboldshausen (outlying centre of Neuenstein) was built. Once this link was in place, there followed in the same year the building of a mountain hotel, a holiday village (“Feriendorf am Eisenberg”) and a transmission tower.

On 22 August 1977, the dam at the Seepark Kirchheim burst and washed the railway tracks out near Kirchheim. This was Deutsche Bundesbahn's reason for abandoning the line.

=== Amalgamations ===
Within the framework of municipal reform, the villages of Allendorf, Frielingen, Gershausen, Goßmannsrode, Kemmerode and Reimboldshausen merged themselves into Kirchheim with effect from 1 February 1971. With effect from 31 December 1971, Rotterterode followed. The other four villages were amalgamated by law on 1 August 1972.

=== Population development ===
	Allendorf *	Frielingen **	Gersdorf	Gershausen	Goßmannsrode ***	Heddersdorf	Kemmerode	Kirchheim	Reckerode ****	Reimboldsh.	Rotterterode	Willingshain	Totals (after amalgamation)
	Households												
1610	-	-	29	23	-	19	14	75	35	5	6	33	-
1747	18	38	39	19	26	19	15	81	25	6	12	52	-
	Inhabitants												
1834	150	391	211	166	165	192	105	734	217	92	132	329	-
1840	154	413	234	164	182	168	92	733	113	93	134	361	-
1846	173	430	214	192	194	170	93	730	245	101	157	358	-
1852	186	390	204	192	200	172	100	759	229	95	171	353	-
1858	186	345	174	184	178	165	91	694	267	90	149	335	-
1864	179	356	179	190	167	157	106	686	246	106	145	247	-
1871	166	344	188	182	152	151	89	616	219	78	140	273	-
1875	164	327	186	177	137	139	81	582	219	67	144	268	-
1885	175	296	165	163	140	141	89	547	220	79	132	259	-
1895	178	299	181	169	144	150	77	548	223	65	123	242	-
1905	170	333	208	197	146	188	79	549	222	70	117	249	-
1910	152	333	194	187	137	197	82	569	222	73	120	268	-
1925	188	365	194	190	138	192	101	604	232	70	114	273	-
1939	163	348	195	184	146	205	74	705	204	80	99	249	-
1946	244	530	351	288	185	294	136	1,091	309	120	120	376	-
1950	252	533	304	287	196	292	133	1,126	338	115	144	353	-
1956	217	448	259	226	173	235	100	1,018	245	87	117	296	-
1961	193	389	224	199	164	226	98	1,085	230	66	87	276	-
1967	153	383	211	223	137	203	86	1,445	207	71	82	243	-
1970	148	416	191	227	144	224	76	1,544	224	75	84	243	-
1982	178	419	186	293	156	229	72	1,864	209	104	96	267	4,073
2004	146	406	161	332	153	217	65	1,920	164	77	81	253	3,975

*Before the Thirty Years' War 18 men, in 1673 only 8

**In 1585 there were 50 households.

***In 1637 there were 14 households.

****Before the Thirty Years' War there were 35 households. After the war, in 1650 there were 9 families and about 1745 there were 25 families. At the first census in 1830 the community had 211 inhabitants.

== Politics ==
=== Community council ===
The municipal election held on 26 March 2006 yielded the following results:

Parties and voter communities		% 2006	Seats; 2006	% 2001	Seats; 2001
CDU	Christian Democratic Union of Germany	43.7	10	46.6	11
SPD	Social Democratic Party of Germany	56.3	13	53.4	12
Total		100.0	23	100.0	23
Voter turnout in %		59.0		61.7	

The community's executive (Gemeindevorstand) is made up of eight members, with five seats allotted to the SPD and three to the CDU.

=== Mayor ===
Mayor Manfred Koch (SPD) was elected on 23 May 2004 with 55.2% of the vote.

=== Coat of arms ===
The community's arms might be described thus: Vert two bendlets argent, the chief Or sapiné.

The German blazon refers to the parting as Tannenspitzenschnitt, or “firtree top cut”. The blazon also explains that the bendlets are a stylized representation of the Autobahn.

== Economy and infrastructure ==
=== Transport ===
The community lies right at the three-way Autobahn interchanges of Kirchheim and Hattenbach, putting the Autobahnen A 4 (Aachen–Görlitz), A 5 (Hattenbach–Basel) and A 7 (Flensburg–Füssen) right nearby. Through the community also runs Bundesstraße 454 from Kirchhain to Niederaula.
