= Buchenau (Eiterfeld) =

- Ortsteil of Eiterfeld
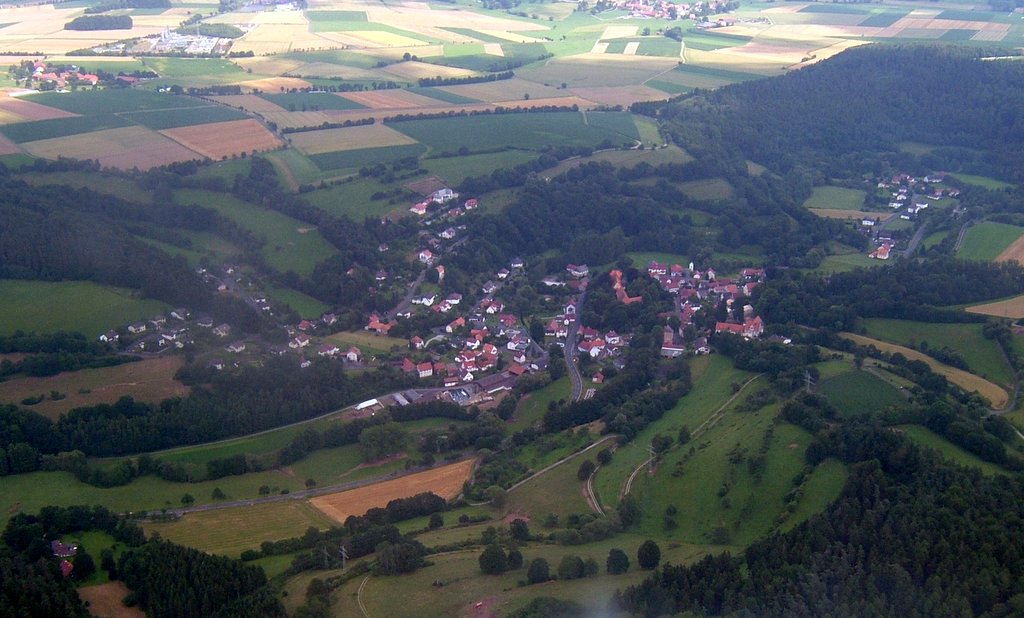
- Aerial photo of Buchenau

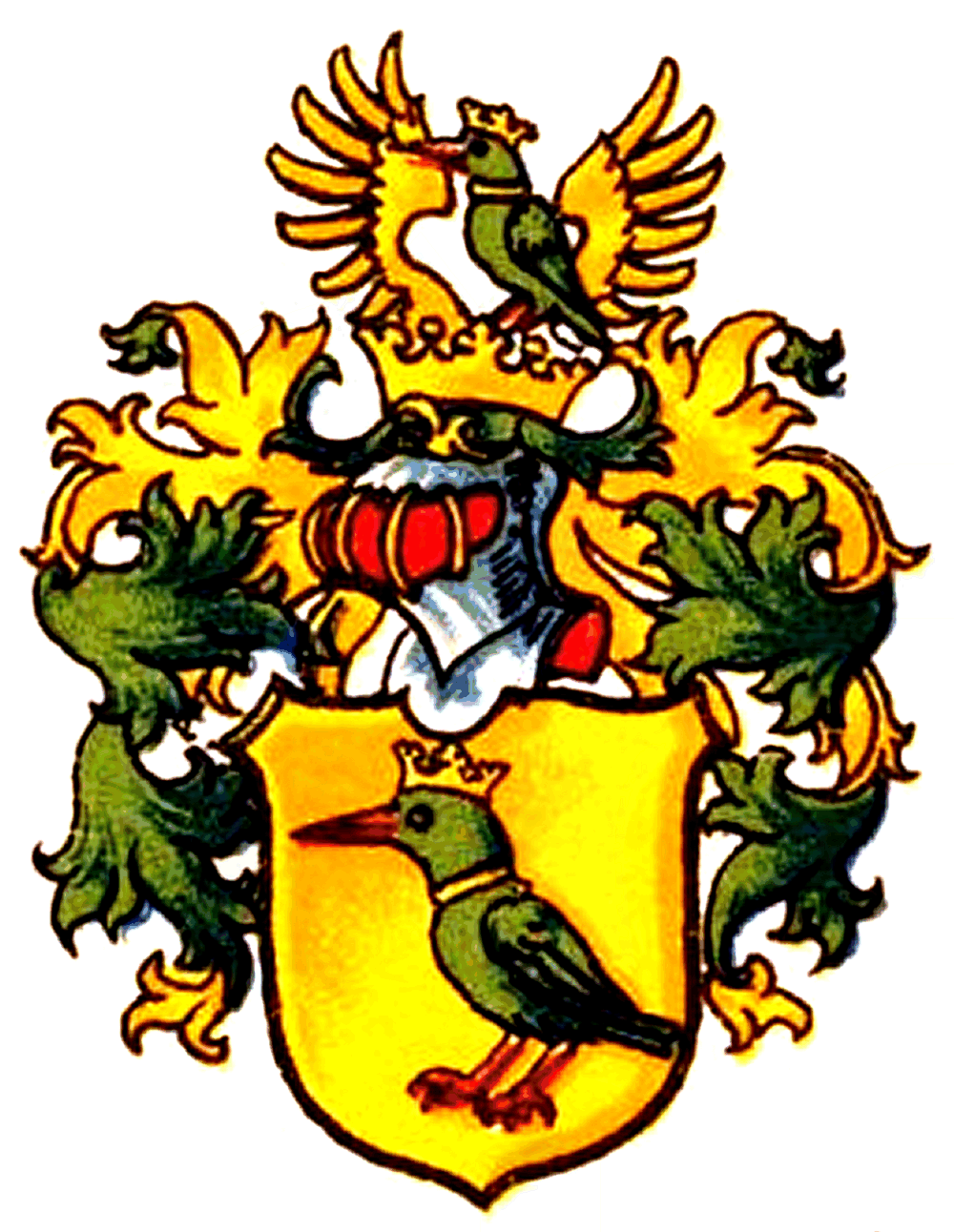
- Coat of arms
- Interactive map of Buchenau
- Location within Germany Location within Hesse
- Coordinates: 50°46′53″N 9°45′56″E
- Country: Germany
- State: Hesse
- Admin. region: Eiterfeld
- District: Fulda
- Municipality: Eiterfeld

Area
  - Total: 15.84 km^{2} (6.12 sq mi)
- Elevation: 266 m (873 ft)

Population (2017-12-31)
  - Total: 353
  - Density: 22.3/km^{2} (57.7/sq mi)
- Time zone: UTC+01:00 (CET)
  - Summer (DST): UTC+02:00 (CEST)
- Postal codes: 36132
- Dialling codes: 06672

Buchenau is a district of the market town Eiterfeld in the district of Fulda and has around 350 inhabitants.

== Geography ==
Buchenau lies in a valley on the northern edge of the Rhön Mountains. The Eitra river, a tributary of the Haune, flows through the town. Three castles, a historical church and numerous half-timbered houses characterize the look of the area.

== History ==
In 948 Buchenau was first mentioned in a document by Otto I as Buochon . In 1217 the name Buchenau first appeared as the seat of the noble family of the same name. The knighthood, which had reached its peak under Eberhard von Buchenau in the late Middle Ages, died in 1815 through the suicide of the 18-year-old Ludwig Karl von Buchenau in the male line. In 1572 the Spiegel Castle was built by Eberhard von Buchenau and in 1578 Conrad Hermann von Buchenau had the Seckendorff Castle built. Both castles are located together within a moat and a double wall and are known as the "Old Castle". From 1611 to 1618 the Buchenau Castle was built. The names of the three Buchenau castles in use today (Spiegel-Schloss, Seckendorff-Schloss and Schenck-Schloss) come from the former and current owners.

Buchenau became Protestant around 1555. When in 1629 the Fulda monastery abbot, Johann Bernhard Schenk zu Schweinsberg, wanted to reinstate the Catholic church constitution, the von Buchenau family protested and temporarily fled to Bad Hersfeld. As a result, Buchenau remained Protestant, although it was then again in the Catholic monastery area.

=== Territory Reform ===
On 1. August, 1972, the previously independent municipality of Buchenau, which also included the district Giesenhain, was incorporated into the municipality of Eiterfeld by state law as part of the territorial reform in Hesse.

=== The Buchenau Court ===
The "Buchenau Court" referred to the rule of the Lords of Buchenau. The court was under the rulership of the Fulda Abbey and included Buchenau, Bodes, Branders, Erdmannrode, Fischbach (Hauneck), Giesenhain and Soislieden.

== Culture and Tourist Attractions ==
=== Buildings ===
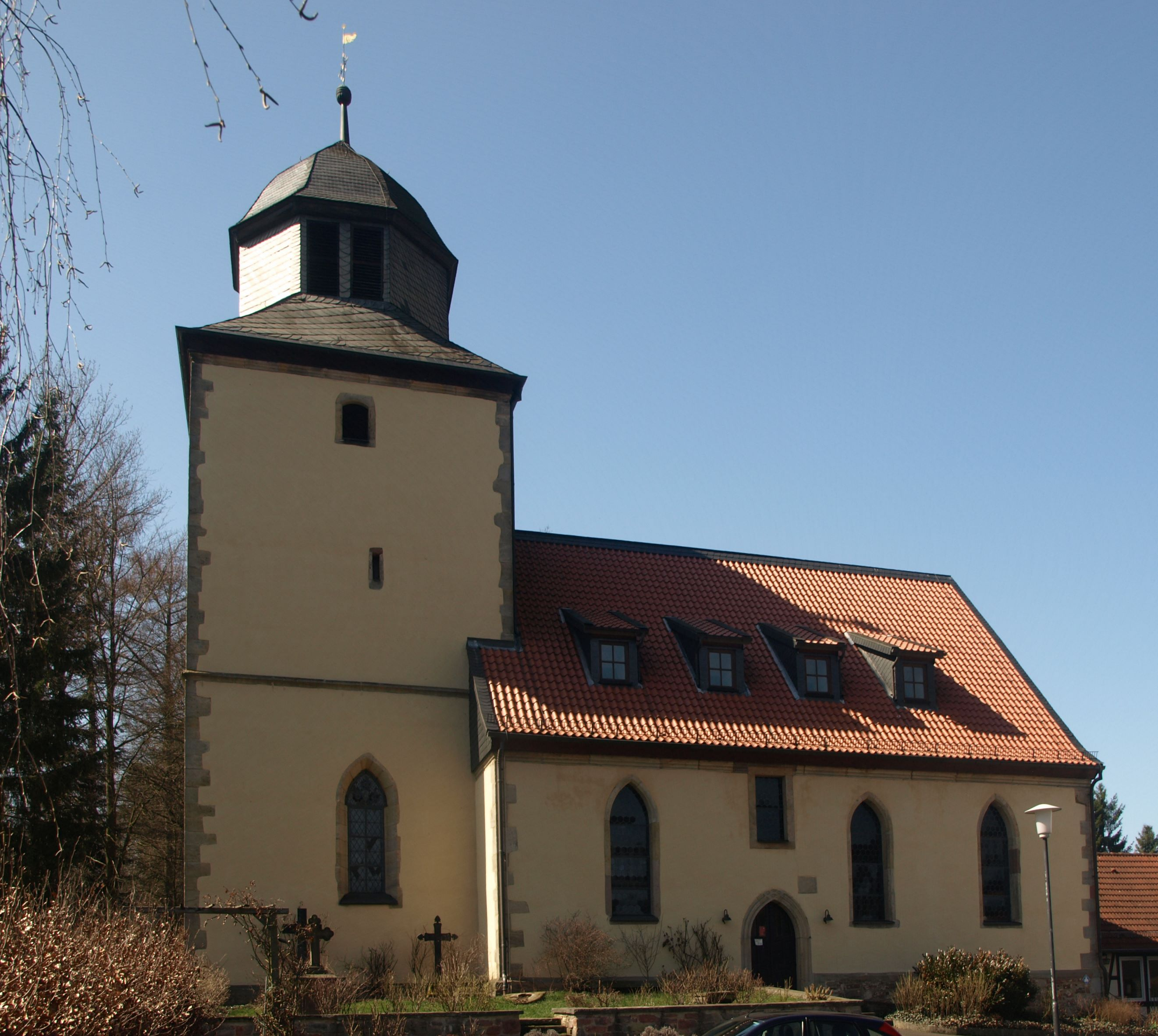
The Protestant church of 1573

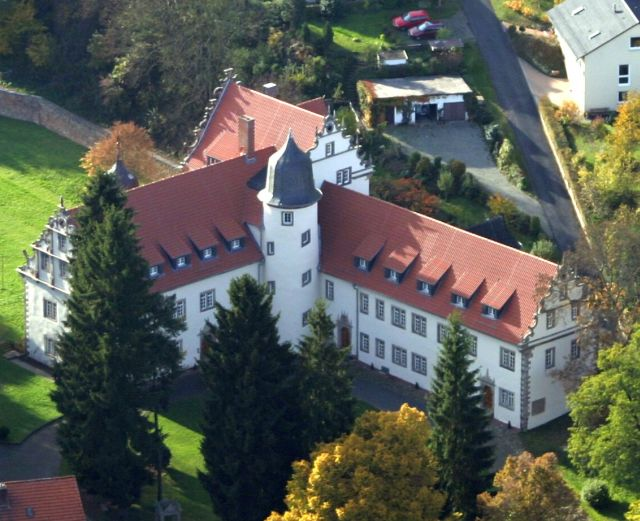
Aerial view of Schloss Buchenau

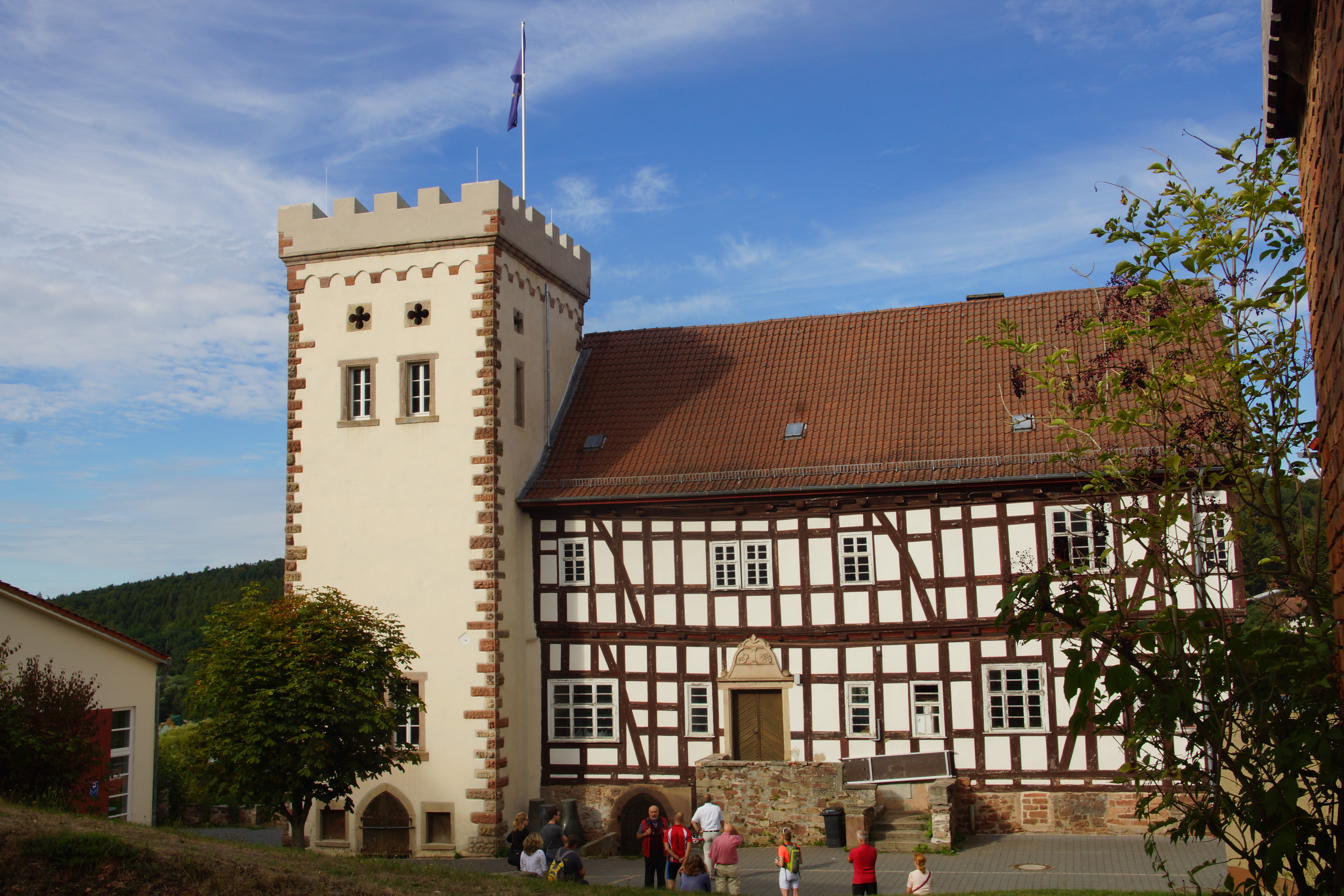
The Generalshaus

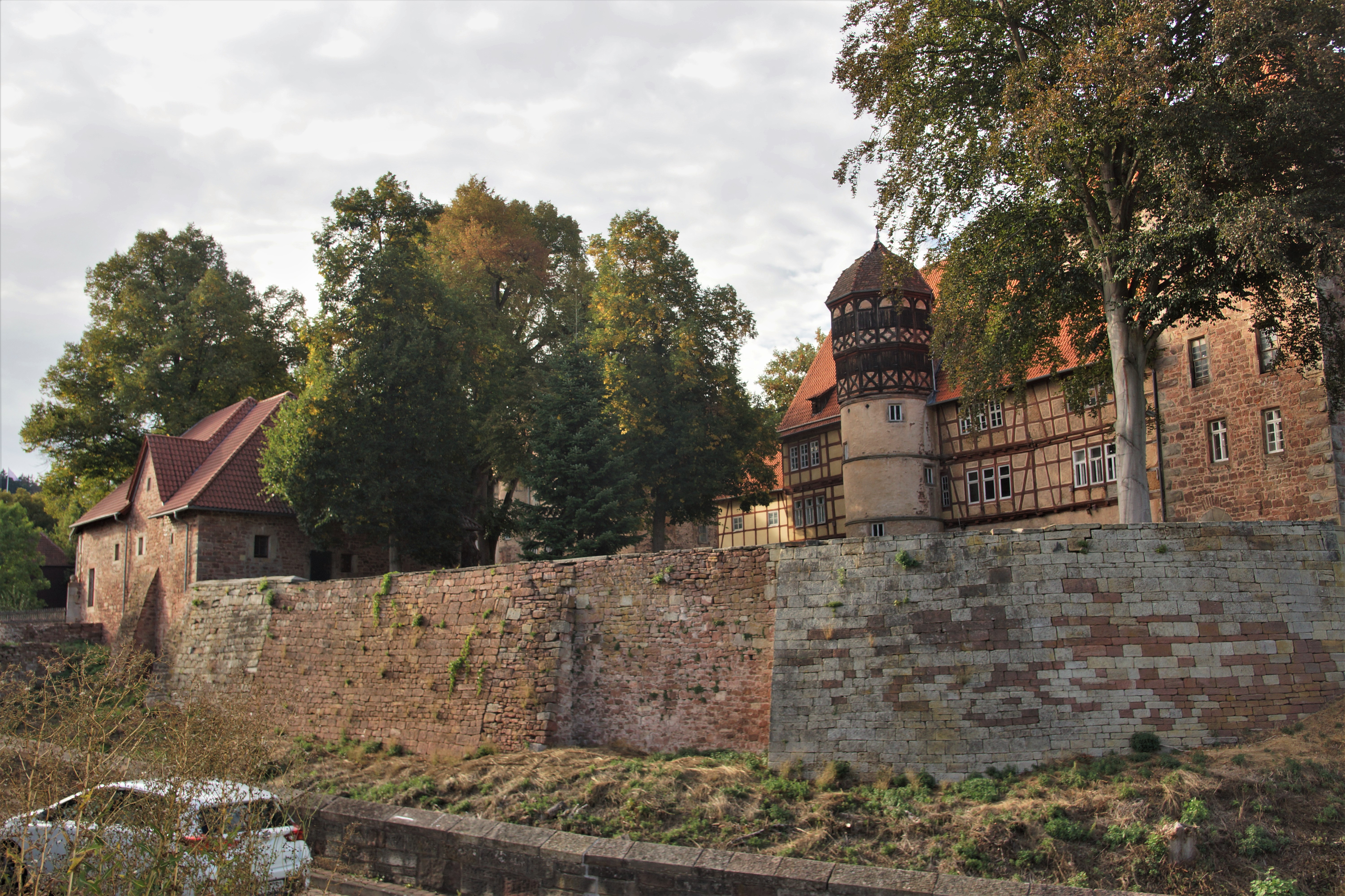
Seckendorffschloss Buchenau

==== Protestant church ====
The Protestant church was built by Eberhard von Buchenau between 1568 and 1573. It was designed as a single-nave church with a choir from 1820. The interior design dates from the 1800s and is equipped with three-sided, two-storey galleries. Two wooden reliefs from an altar shrine, several grave monuments in the choir from the 16th to 19th centuries and the organ from 1787 are notable.

==== Schloss Buchenau, also known as Schenckschloss ====
The Buchenau Castle is a two-wing castle built in the Weser Renaissance style. The castle was built between 1611 and 1618 by Georg Melchior von Buchenau (with wife Agnes von Schwalbach). The von Schenck zu Schweinsberg family acquired the castle in 1694 and lived there until 1912.

==== Generalshaus ====
The Generalshaus is a half-timbered house built in 1550 and was once the financial administration office for the Schenck Castle. The house was likely built by Georg von Buchenau (1535 to 1563) and his wife Susanne von Mansbach. A tower was built in 1904 as a copy of the tower on the Wartburg in Eisenach. The sandstone portal bears the Alliance coat of arms from Buchenau and from Schenck zu Schweinsberg. The Generalshaus is the main building in the 'Upper Castle' area. It got its name from a general of Schenck zu Schweinsberg.

==== Spiegelschloss ====
The Spiegelschloss is a two-wing lock building in the Renaissance style and is located right next to the Seckendorff lock. In order to stop the ongoing deterioration of the castle, structural measures are urgently required.

==== Seckendorffschloss ====
The castle was built and added to over several centuries and today offers a very mixed architectural style. The last large extension dates from the Renaissance period, but original construction is still clearly visible. To the east, a second tower was added to the existing building. Both towers are rectangular and were likely supplemented in 1578 by a stone/half-timbered building, thus giving their present appearance.

== Literature ==
- Michael Mott: Spiegel-Schloß als "Kummerprojekt" / In Buchenau: Zeitzeugen fuldischen Uradels / Kostspielige Notsicherung: Fördermittel von fast 700 000 Mark investiert, in: Fuldaer Zeitung, 9. Nov. 1995, S. 16 (Serie: DENK-mal!).
- Adrian Seib: Kulturdenkmäler in Hessen. Landkreis Fulda II. Burghaun, Eiterfeld, Hünfeld, Nüsttal, Rasdorf. Landesamt für Denkmalpflege Hessen (Herausgeber und Verlag), Wiesbaden 2011, ISBN 978-3-8062-2607-2, S. 164–178.
- There is literature about Buchenau (Eiterfeld) in the Hessian Bibliography
