= Haunetal =

- Municipality
- Coat of arms

- Location of Haunetal within Hersfeld-Rotenburg district
- Interactive map of Haunetal
- Location within Germany Location within Hesse
- Coordinates: 50°46′N 09°40′E
- Country: Germany
- State: Hesse
- Admin. region: Kassel
- District: Hersfeld-Rotenburg
- Subdivisions: 15 districts

Government
  - Mayor (2020–26): Timo Lübeck (CDU)

Area
  - Total: 54.94 km^{2} (21.21 sq mi)
- Elevation: 307 m (1,007 ft)

Population (2025-12-31)
  - Total: 2,769
  - Density: 50.40/km^{2} (130.5/sq mi)
- Time zone: UTC+01:00 (CET)
  - Summer (DST): UTC+02:00 (CEST)
- Postal codes: 36166
- Dialling codes: 06673
- Vehicle registration: HEF
- Website: www.marktgemeinde-haunetal.de

Haunetal (German pronunciation: [ˈhaʊnətaːl], lit. 'Haune Valley') is a municipality in Hersfeld-Rotenburg district in eastern Hesse, Germany. Haunetal is the district's southernmost municipality.

== Geography ==
=== Location ===
Haunetal is located in the Vorderrhön (literally: “Anterior Rhön”) between Bad Hersfeld, which is some 13 km (8.1 mi) from it, and Hünfeld, which is some 14 km (8.7 mi) from it. The community stretches along both sides of the lower Haune river. Rising above the community is the 524 m-high (1,719 ft) Stoppelsberg.

=== Neighbouring communities ===
Haunetal borders in the northwest on the community of Niederaula, in the northeast on the community of Hauneck (both in Hersfeld-Rotenburg), in the east on the community of Eiterfeld, in the south on the community of Burghaun (both in Fulda district) and in the west on the town of Schlitz (in the Vogelsbergkreis).

=== Constituent communities ===
Haunetal's Ortsteile are Hermannspiegel, Holzheim, Kruspis, Mauers, Meisenbach, Müsenbach, Neukirchen, Oberstoppel, Unterstoppel, Odensachsen, Rhina, Schletzenrod, Stärklos, Wehrda and Wetzlos.

== History ==
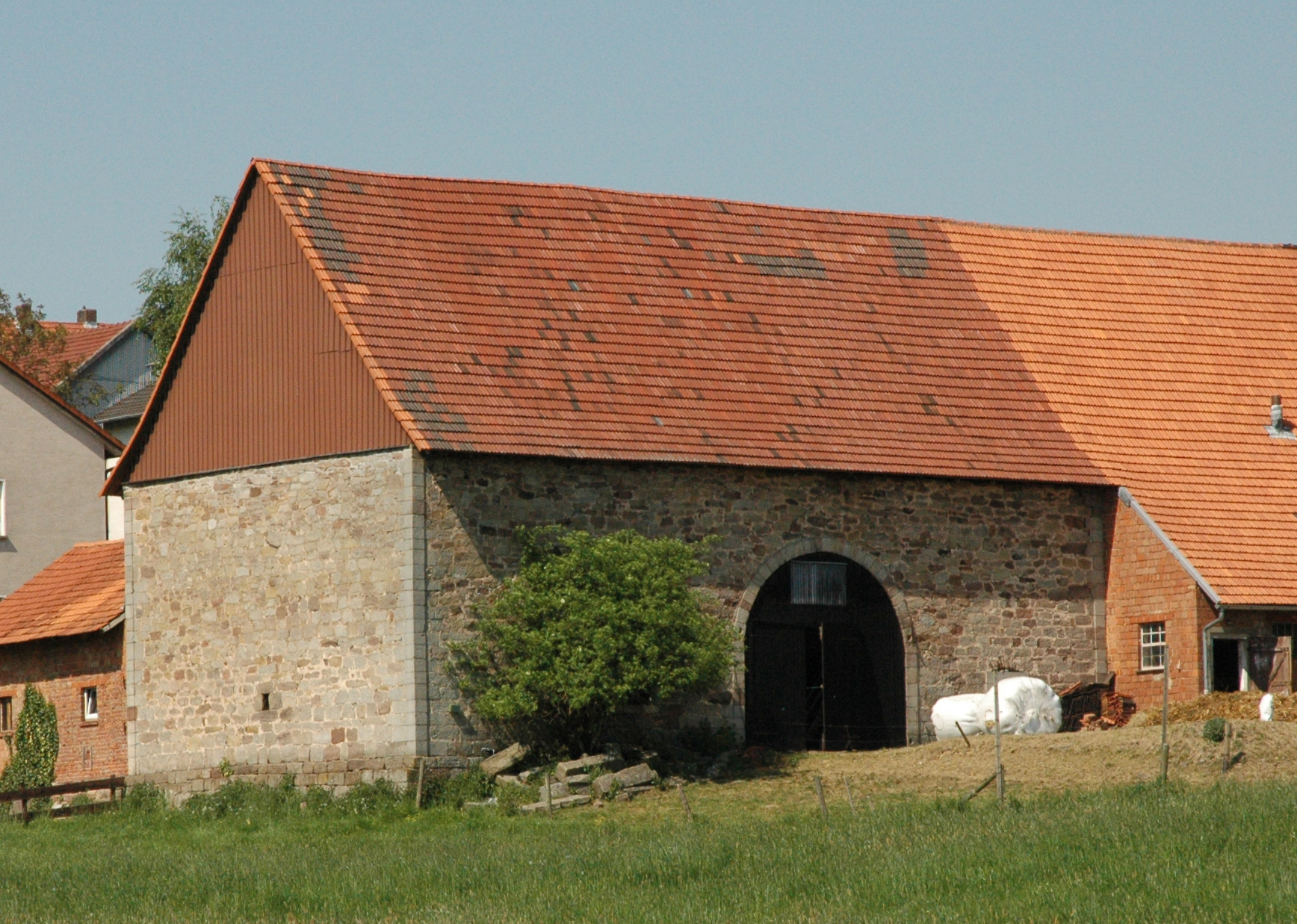
Tithe barn in Unterstoppel

The constituent communities of Odensachsen and Rhina had their first documentary mention on 1003 when Emperor Heinrich II divided the Imperial forest of Ehringswald (Ehrenvirst) up between the Hersfeld Abbey and the Fulda Abbey.

Some of today's constituent communities were already governed together in the Middle Ages under the lordship of Wehrda and later in the Amt of Neukirchen. Most of the places belonged to one of the two above-named monastic institutions, which had enfeoffed them to the Knights of Romrod, of Trubenbach (later Trümbach), of Otensassen and of Haune (later Hune). The last-named were the ones who built Hauneck Castle.

In 1886, the writer Heinrich Ruppel was born in Haunetal. In a barn in the constituent community of Neukirchen, towards the end of the Second World War, Konrad Zuse’s computer Z4 was sheltered.

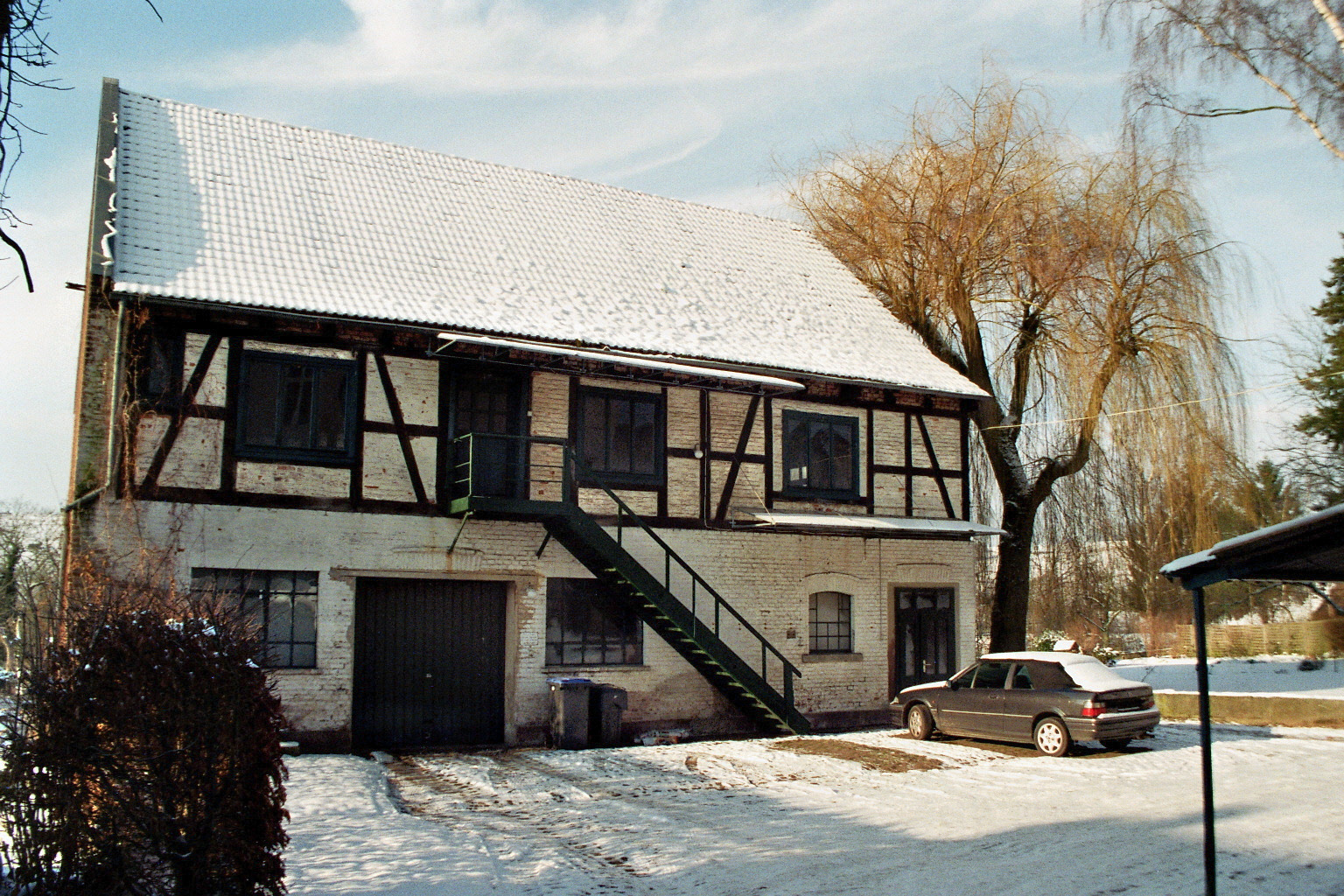
Konrad Zuses factory at Neukirchen (situation january 2010)

Konrad Zuse founded Zuse KG in Neukirchen in 1949; in 1957 the company’s head office moved to Bad Hersfeld.

The above-named constituent communities were merged by municipal reform in 1971 into the greater community of Haunetal. Since 16 May 1998, the community of Haunetal has had leave to style itself “Marktgemeinde” (“Market Community”)

== Politics ==
=== Community council ===
The municipal election held on 26 March 2006 yielded the following results:

Parties and voter communities		% 2006	Seats; 2006	% 2001	Seats; 2001
CDU	Christian Democratic Union of Germany	42.4	10	40.3	9
SPD	Social Democratic Party of Germany	49.2	11	47.2	11
FDP	Free Democratic Party	2.0	0	–	–
FWG	Freie Wählergemeinschaft Haunetal	6.4	2	9.3	2
GREENS	Bündnis 90/Die Grünen	–	–	3.3	1
Total		100.0	23	100.0	23
Voter turnout in %		63.0		70.5	

The community's executive (Gemeindevorstand) is made up of nine members, with four seats allotted to the SPD, four to the CDU and 1 to the FWG.

=== Mayor ===
- 1995–2011: Hein-Peter Möller (SPD)
- 2011–2014: Stefan Euler
- 2014–2020: Gerd Lang
- 2020–present: Timo Lübeck (CDU)

== Culture and sightseeing ==
=== Buildings ===
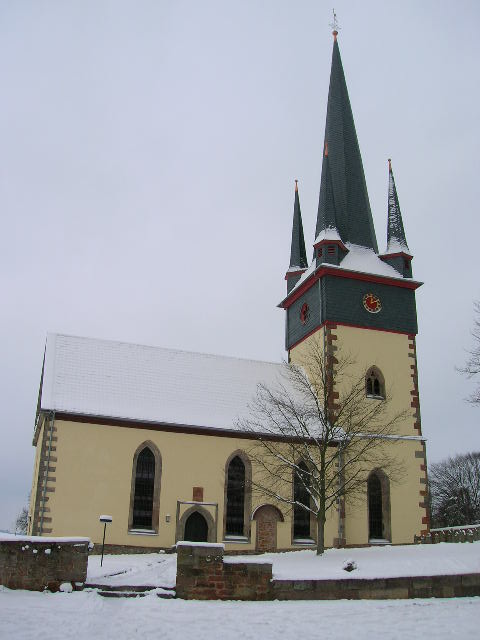
Neukirchen Evangelical Church, January 2006

The Evangelical church in Neukirchen was built in Late Gothic in 1515 on a lower structure that was partly Romanesque. Worthy of note among the inner features are the carved winged altar from 1522 and the baptismal font from 1588.

Above Neukirchen and Oberstoppel, on Haunetal's local mountain, the Stoppelsberg, is found Hauneck Castle, whose building history reaches back to the 14th century. From even further into the past comes the Sinzigburg, a castle west of the Stoppelsberg in the Haune valley. Not far away, likewise on the Stoppelsberg's slopes is the natural monument called the Lange Steine (“Long Stones”).

Further buildings in the constituent community of Wehrda are the Gothic fortified church with old rustic frescoes, the Schloss Hohenwehrda (palatial castle built about 1900 by Prince von Kleidorff, today a Hermann Lietz boarding school), the Rotes Schloß (“Red Palace”, today owned by Baron Johannes von Campenhausen) and the Altwehrda (“Old Wehrda”) ruins (believed to have been the first fortified settlement in a fortified defensive tower, built by the Knights of Trumbach, later of Stein). Old Jewish cemeteries can be found in Wehrda and Rhina.

=== Culinary specialities ===
One culinary speciality from the Haune valley is Ploatz, a hearty sheet cake made of rye bread dough with variable topping.

== Famous people ==
=== Sons and daughters of the town ===
- Konrad Zuse, computer pioneer
