= Röderbach (Hasel) =

River in Germany

Location
- Country: Germany
- State: Hesse

Physical characteristics
- Source
  - location: Near Stendorf, a district of Hünfeld
  - coordinates: 50.7206°N 9.8282°E
- Mouth
  - location: Between Kirchhasel and Großenbach, districts of Hünfeld, into the Hasel
  - coordinates: 50.6931°N 9.8032°E

Basin features
- Progression: Hasel→ Haune→ Fulda→ Weser→ North Sea

Röderbach is a river of Hesse, Germany.

The Röderbach springs near Stendorf, a district of Hünfeld. It is a right tributary of the Hasel between the two districts Kirchhasel and Großenbach of Hünfeld.

== See also ==
- List of rivers of Hesse
