= Rhina, Hesse =

Village in Hesse, Germany

Coordinates: 50.7632°N 9.68296°E

Rhina is a village in eastern Hesse, Germany, belonging to the Haunetal municipality within the district of Hersfeld-Rotenburg. In 2004, the population of Rhina consisted of 509 residents.

== History ==
The village was first mentioned in documents in 1003. However, the first traces of humans in the area are from the early Paleolithic Era and Middle Stone Age from the years 10000 to 6000BC. Settlement during the Middle Ages occurred mainly in the area around the German abbey at Fulda, although sovereignty over the area would be widely established by German knights. From the late Middle Ages on, the families from Trubenbach (today Truembach), Bimbach, Buchenau, and Haune in Rhina were considerably wealthy. In the 15th century, the Landgraviate of Hesse succeeded in acquiring rights to the estate of Rhina. During the time of the Reformation, this led to violent conflicts between Hesse and the noble families over rights to the village.

The church of Rhina was originally consecrated in the name of St. Nicholas. In 1529 and 1530, it was reformed. During the Reformation, the local production of pottery developed in the village. The first evidence of the presence of Jews in the village is documented from 1631 during the Thirty Years War. From the 18th century especially, the Jewish community grew at a regular rate, the first synagogue being erected in 1782. In 1806, Rhina came under the rule of the Kingdom of Westphalia. The neighboring village of Wehrda was the seat of the nobility and Rhina belonged to the canton of Holzheim. The church of Rhina was re-built in 1814. In 1821, Rhina was incorporated into the Hünfeld district of the Hessian province of Fulda. Rhina's synagogue was rebuilt from 1831 to 1832. In 1835, the first village-wide local elections were held. A Jewish cemetery was created in 1837. The residents of the villages of Wehrda, Rhina, Schletzenrod, and Wetzlos rebelled against the noble lordship of the region in the Revolution of 1848. In the course of the conflict, attacks were also carried out against Rhina's Jews. In 1862, following a great increase in the Jewish population of Rhina, a Jewish grade school was opened. Rhina received its first telephone in 1902, and in 1912 developed water and plumbing infrastructure. In 1933, following an order by the NSDAP district leadership as well as the office of the regional administration, the Jewish members of the municipal council were forced to resign from their posts. From 1934, assaults on Jewish property and against those of Jewish faith began to occur. In 1935, those attending the synagogue were beaten up. In 1937, a catastrophic storm befell the village. On 10 November 1938, Rhina's large, integrated Jewish school was burnt to the ground. Rhina's mayor declared the village "judenfrei" (free of Jews) on 1 March 1939. 49 people were deported by train to ghettos and murdered in death camps. Beginning in 1949, reparations were made to surviving Jews and to the JRSO (Jewish Restitution Successor Organization) within the American occupation zone. In 1965, a village community center was dedicated on the former site of Rhina's synagogue. Rhina was greatly affected by floods after an overflowing of the Haune River in 1966. In 1971, within the framework of a redistricting act in Hesse, Rhina was incorporated into the community of Haunetal.

== Notable residents ==
- Jakob Nussbaum (born 8 January 1873 in Rhina; died 19 December 1936 in Kinnereth/Israel), Artist
- Leopold Katzenstein (born 23 July 1843 in Rhina, died 3 December 1915 in New York City), Marine architect, Naval engineer, Inventor
