= Hasel (Haune) =

River in Germany

Location
- Country: Germany
- State: Hesse

Physical characteristics
- Source
  - location: Near Haselstein, a district of Nüsttal
  - coordinates: 50.6845°N 9.8663°E
- Mouth
  - location: At Hünfeld into the Haune
  - coordinates: 50.6788°N 9.7579°E

Basin features
- Progression: Haune→ Fulda→ Weser→ North Sea

The Hasel (German pronunciation: [ˈhaːzl̩]) is a river of Hesse, Germany.

The Hasel springs near Haselstein, a district of Nüsttal. It is a right tributary of the Haune near Hünfeld.

== See also ==
- List of rivers of Hesse
