= Erwin Reuben Jacobi =

French-Swiss harpsichordist, organist and musicologist

Erwin Reuben Salomon Jacobi (born 21 September 1909 in Strasbourg; died 27 February 1978 in Zurich) was a French-Swiss harpsichordist, organist and musicologist.

== Life and works ==
Born on 21 September 1909 in Strasbourg, the son of Arthur Eugen Jacobi (187-1933), engineer and manufacturer, and Margit Jacobi (née Schweitzer), Jacobi studied economics in Munich and Berlin. A German Jew, Jacobi and his family were forced to flee Nazi Germany. Jacobi went to Palestine, later Israel, where he lived from 1934 to 1952. His mother, Margit, was deported and murdered by the Nazis in the Holocaust.

In 1951 and 1952, he studied with Frank Pelleg (harpsichord) and Paul Ben-Haim (music theory). He continued his musical education in New York with Curt Sachs (music history), Wanda Landowska (harpsichord) and at the Schola Cantorum Basiliensis with August Wenzinger (early music) and Eduard Müller (organ). After further studies at the University of Zurich with Paul Hindemith (music theory) and Antoine-Elisée Cherbuliez (1888-1964), he completed his doctorate in 1957 on “The development of music theory in England after the time of Jean-Philippe Rameau”. Jacobi lived in Switzerland from 1956 and worked as a performer and, from 1961, also as a lecturer at the Musicology Institute of the University of Zurich. He also held various guest professorships in the USA.

Jacobi researched primarily in the field of music theory and practice in the 17th and 18th centuries. Among other things, he edited the complete edition of Rameau's theoretical works. The French government honored him for his research work with the title Chevalier de l'Ordre des Arts et des Lettres. Another focus of his research was the work of Albert Schweitzer, a personal friend whose writings he published.

Jacobi's estate, which includes music theory works from the 15th century to modern times, French baroque harpsichord music and more than 300 autographs by Albert Schweitzer, was acquired by the Zentralbibliothek Zürich in 1974.

== Publications ==
- Albert Schweitzer und die Musik. Verlag Breitkopf & Härtel, Wiesbaden 1975, ISBN 3-7651-0121-4

== Literature ==
- Musik in Zürich, ein Stadtführer: Menschen, Orte, Institutionen, hrsg. von Bernhard Hangartner, David Reissfelder; Chronos Verlag, Zürich 2021, 271 S., ill.; ISBN 978-3-0340-1641-4; S. 96–97.
