= B84 =

B84 may refer to:

- B84 (New York City bus) in Brooklyn
- Bundesstraße 84, a German road
- Faakersee Straße, an Austrian road
- Sicilian Defence, Scheveningen Variation, Encyclopaedia of Chess Openings code
