= Roderbach =

Roderbach or Röderbach may refer to:

- Roderbach (Kyll), a river of North Rhine-Westphalia, Germany, downstream called Langbach, a tributary of the Kyll
- Röderbach (Aschaff), a river of Bavaria, Germany, tributary of the Aschaff
- Röderbach (Hasel), a river of Hesse, Germany, tributary of the Hasel
