= Carl Netter =

Carl Netter may refer to:

- Charles Netter (1826–1882), founding member of the Alliance Israélite Universelle
- Carl Leopold Netter (1864–1922), German entrepreneur and patron of the arts
