= Kalbach =

Municipality in Hesse, Germany

- Municipality
- Coat of arms

- Location of Kalbach within Fulda district
- Interactive map of Kalbach
- Location within Germany Location within Hesse
- Coordinates: 50°24′13″N 09°41′02″E
- Country: Germany
- State: Hesse
- Admin. region: Kassel
- District: Fulda

Government
  - Mayor (2020–26): Mark Bagus

Area
  - Total: 70.64 km^{2} (27.27 sq mi)
- Elevation: 382 m (1,253 ft)

Population (2025-12-31)
  - Total: 6,445
  - Density: 91.24/km^{2} (236.3/sq mi)
- Time zone: UTC+01:00 (CET)
  - Summer (DST): UTC+02:00 (CEST)
- Postal codes: 36148
- Dialling codes: 06655, 09742
- Vehicle registration: FD
- Website: www.gemeinde-kalbach.de

Kalbach is a municipality in the district of Fulda, in Hesse, Germany. Kalbach is about 20 km south of the city of Fulda and 90 km east-northeast of Frankfurt. Kalbach encompasses the communities of Eichenried, Heubach, Mittelkalbach, Niederkalbach, Oberkalbach, Uttrichshausen and Veitsteinbach.
