= Hofbieber =

- Municipality
- Coat of arms

- Location of Hofbieber within Fulda district
- Interactive map of Hofbieber
- Location within Germany Location within Hesse
- Coordinates: 50°35′N 09°50′E
- Country: Germany
- State: Hesse
- Admin. region: Kassel
- District: Fulda

Government
  - Mayor (2018–24): Markus Röder (Ind.)

Area
  - Total: 87.2 km^{2} (33.7 sq mi)
- Elevation: 390 m (1,280 ft)

Population (2025-12-31)
  - Total: 6,271
  - Density: 71.9/km^{2} (186/sq mi)
- Time zone: UTC+01:00 (CET)
  - Summer (DST): UTC+02:00 (CEST)
- Postal codes: 36145
- Dialling codes: 06657
- Vehicle registration: FD
- Website: www.hofbieber.de

Hofbieber is a municipality in the district of Fulda, in Hesse, Germany.

== General ==
Hofbieber is situated in the center of the Hessian Rhön Mountains near the Mountain Milseburg. The municipality of Hofbieber has approximately 6,500 citizens living within eighteen urban districts and some outlying lonesome farms widespread over 90 km^{2} (34.75 mi^{2}). The main income of the city is farming and tourism from weekend visitors from the Frankfurt Rhine-Main Region.

The urban districts are:

- Allmus
- Danzwiesen
- Elters
- Hofbieber
- Kleinsassen
- Langenberg
- Langenbieber
- Mahlerts
- Mittelberg
- Niederbieber
- Obergruben
- Obernüst
- Rödergrund/Egelmes
- Schackau
- Schwarzbach
- Steens
- Wiesen
- Wittges

== Attractions ==
There are well indicated hiking & biking trails in this region.

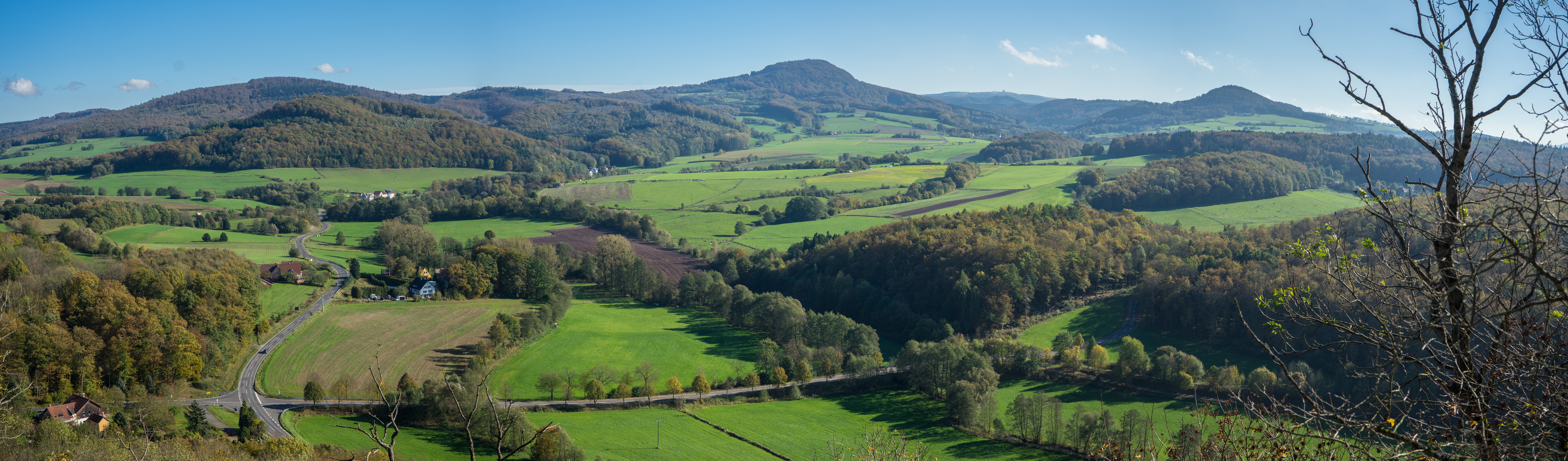
A view from Castle Bieberstein now a boarding school to Milseburg, Wasserkuppe and Stellberg

== Gallery ==
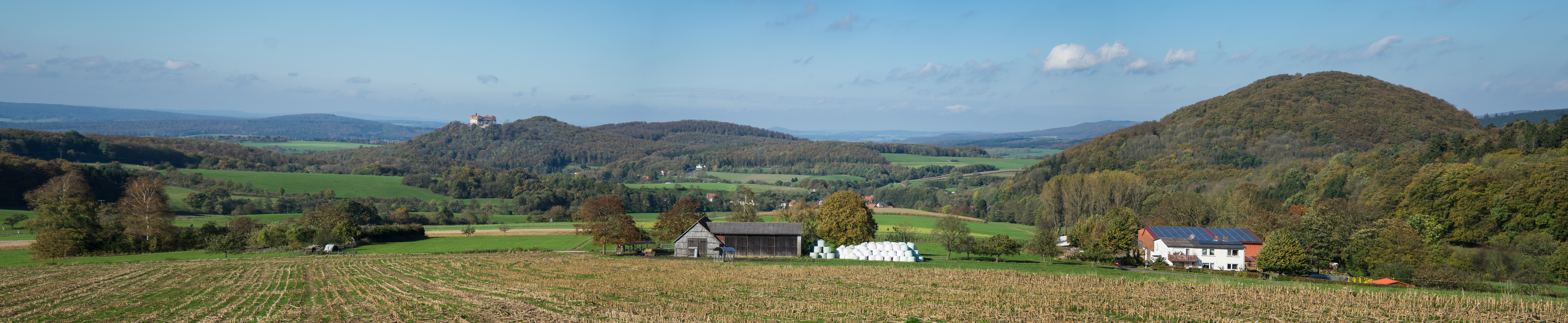
Panoramic View from urban district of Hofbieber, Village Kleinsassen

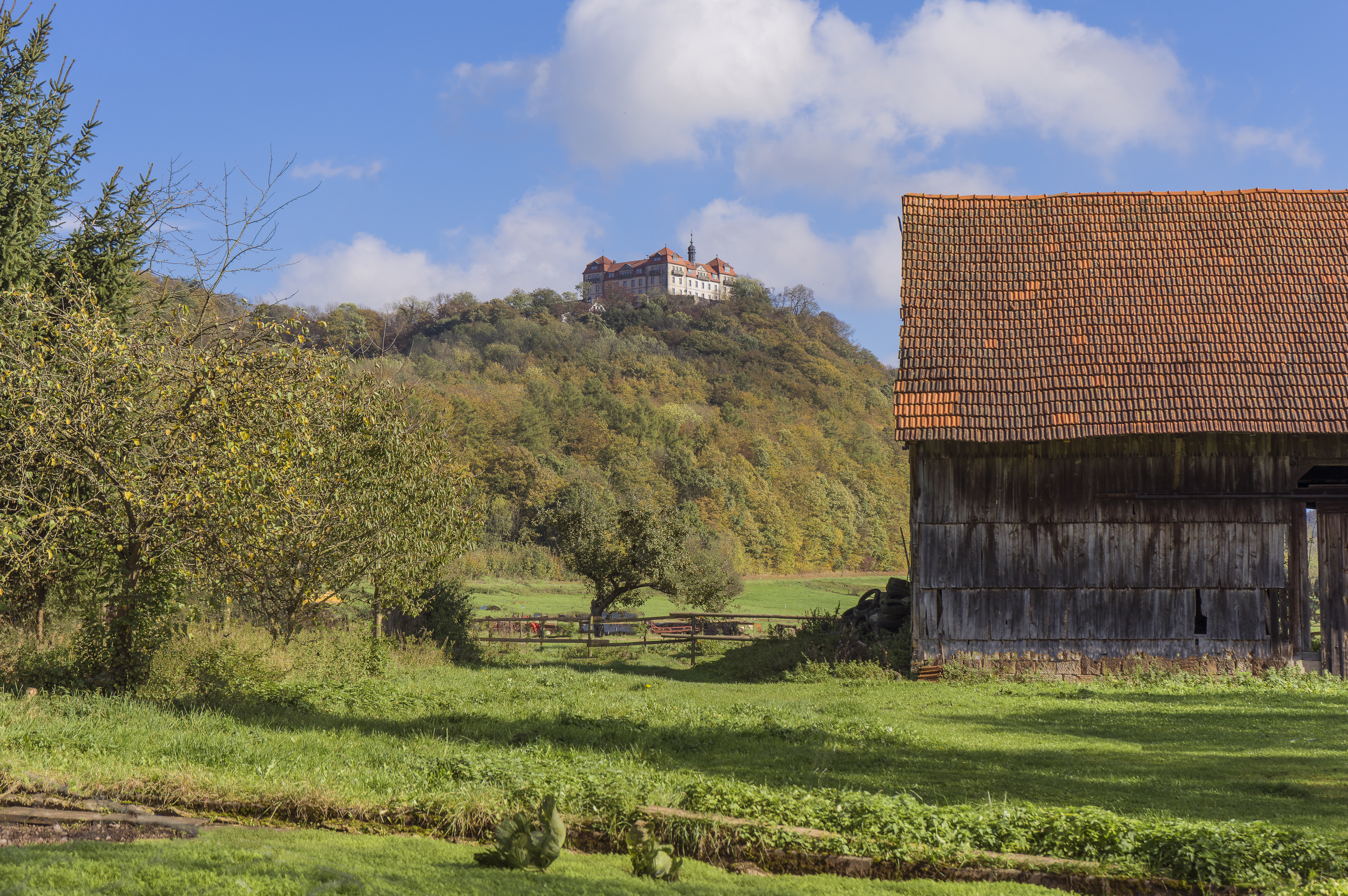
A garden with a view

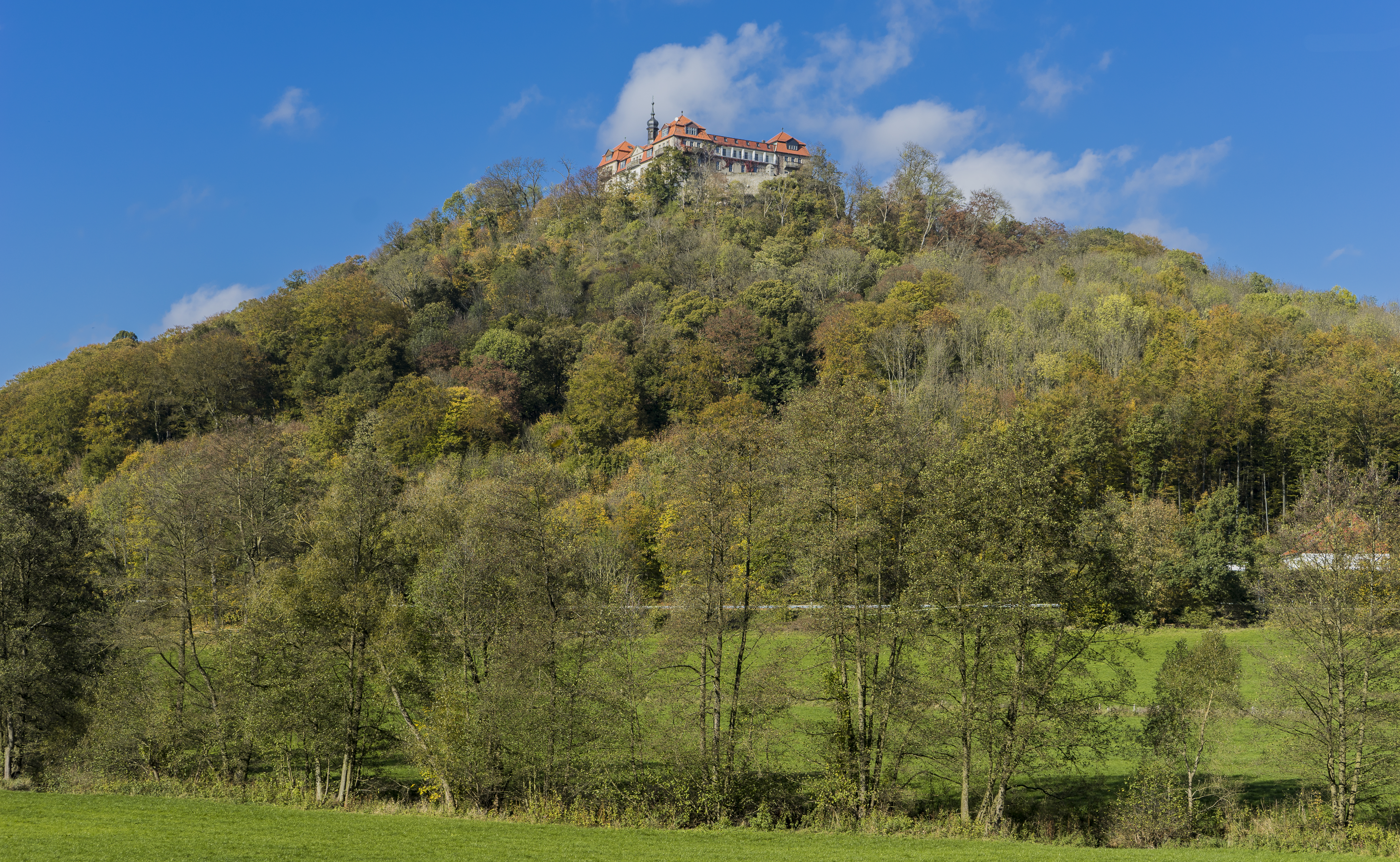
Castle Bieberstein View from brook Bieber

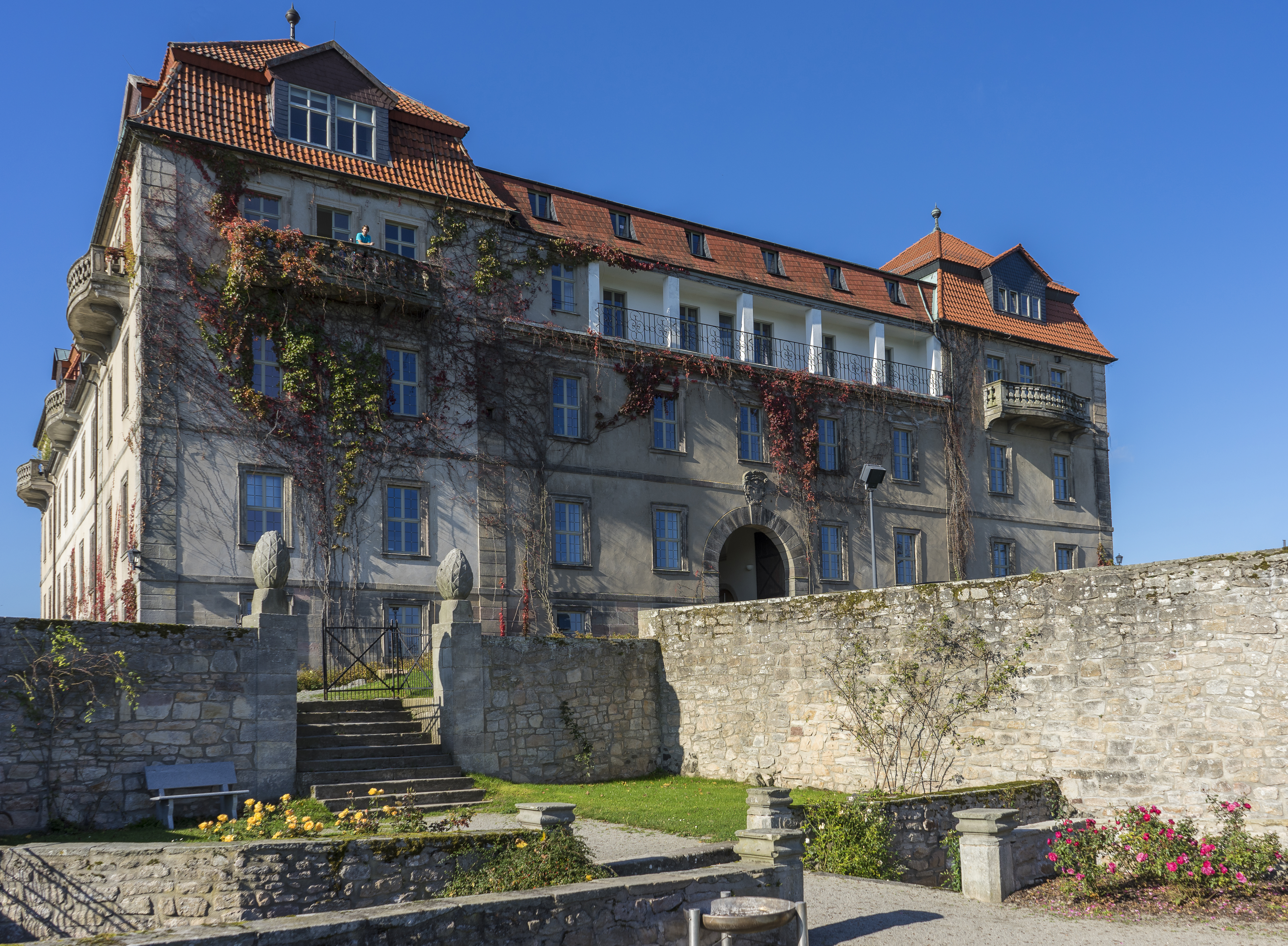
Castle Bieberstein (Eastside)

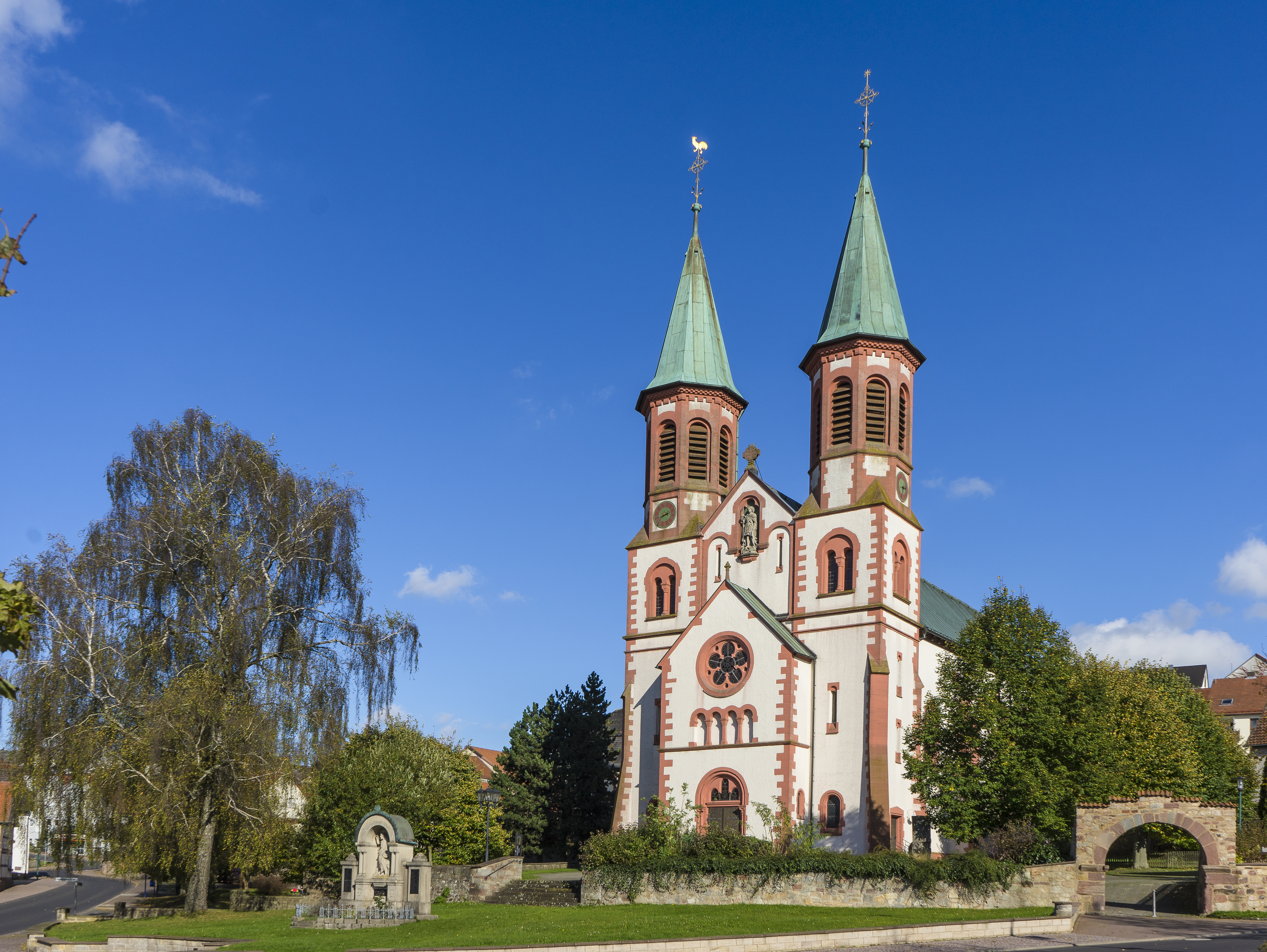
The "Cathedral of the Rhön Mountains" Church St. George in Hofbieber
