= Dipperz =

- Municipality
- Coat of arms

- Location of Dipperz within Fulda district
- Interactive map of Dipperz
- Location within Germany Location within Hesse
- Coordinates: 50°32′N 09°48′E
- Country: Germany
- State: Hesse
- Admin. region: Kassel
- District: Fulda

Government
  - Mayor (2021–27): Klaus-Dieter Vogler

Area
  - Total: 30.05 km^{2} (11.60 sq mi)
- Elevation: 355 m (1,165 ft)

Population (2025-12-31)
  - Total: 3,636
  - Density: 121.0/km^{2} (313.4/sq mi)
- Time zone: UTC+01:00 (CET)
  - Summer (DST): UTC+02:00 (CEST)
- Postal codes: 36160
- Dialling codes: 06657
- Vehicle registration: FD
- Website: www.dipperz.de

Dipperz is a municipality in the district of Fulda in Hesse in Germany.
