= Carl Leopold Netter =

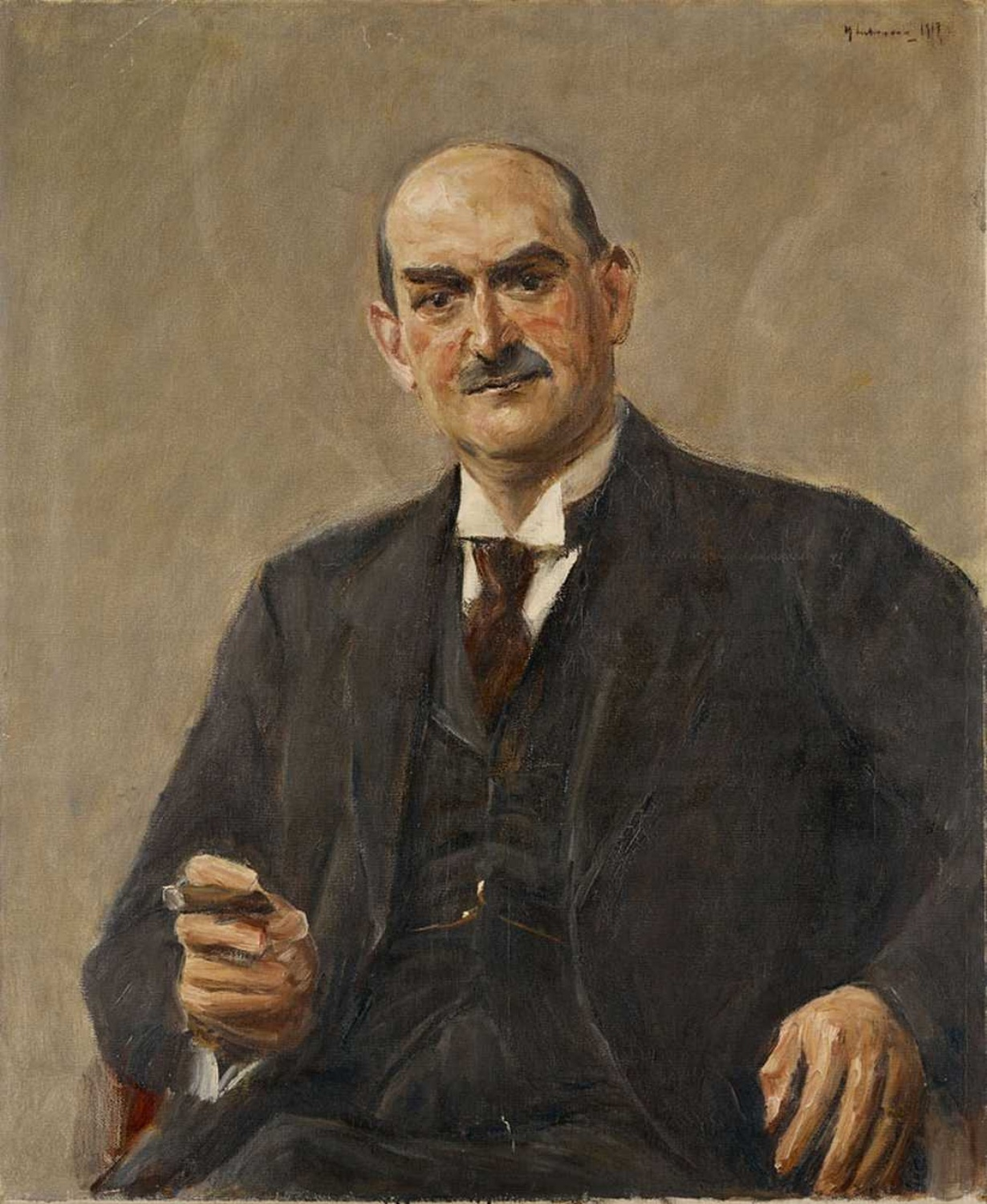
Max Liebermann: Kommerzienrat Dr. Carl Leopold Netter, 1917

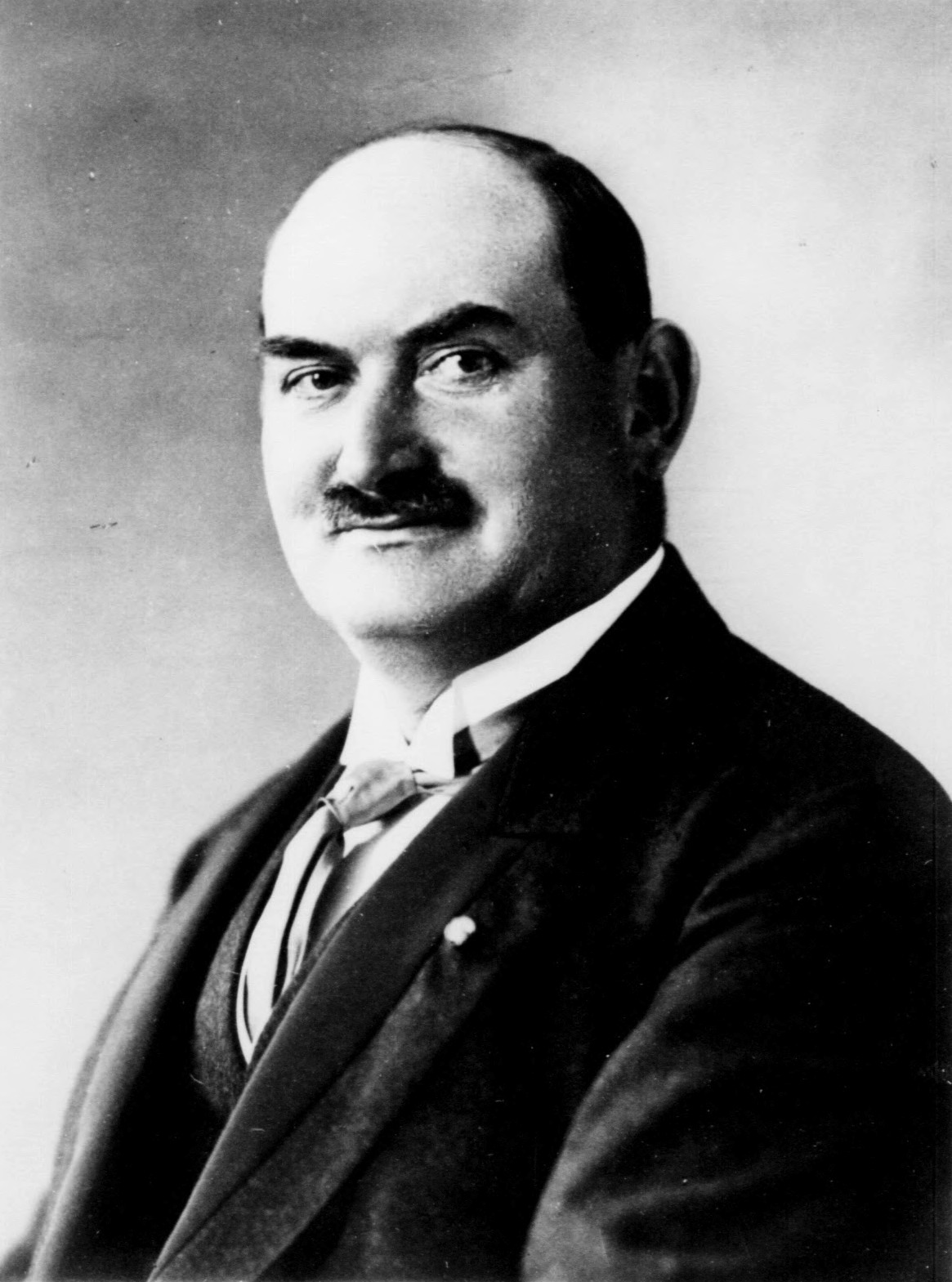
Carl Leopold Netter

Carl Leopold Netter, also known as Karl (born January 29, 1864, in Bühl; died July 14, 1922, in Baden-Baden) was a German entrepreneur and patron of the arts.

== Life and work ==
Netter was the son of the Bühler entrepreneur Jacob Netter, who, together with his brother Joseph, had greatly expanded their father Wolf Netter's ironmongery business and extended it to the manufacture of iron and steel products. In 1873, the company expanded to Strasbourg through Salomon Jacobi and became Wolf Netter & Jacobi. Carl Leopold Netter joined the company management in 1885 after the death of his brother Emil. He took over the management of the factory in Berlin-Adlershof and the representative office in Berlin. The company expanded rapidly during his time.

Carl Leopold Netter was an elder of the Berlin merchants' association and an honorary commercial judge at the Chamber for Commercial Matters at District Court I in Berlin. In the Jewish community of Berlin, he was chairman of the building commission and was a benefactor of the College for the Science of Judaism, the Israelite Hospital and the Jewish Colonization Society (J.C.A.) as well as the Central Association of German Citizens of the Jewish Faith. From 1915 to 1920 he was chairman of the hospital board. He was a member of the Berlin Masonic Lodge Friedrich zur Gerechtigkeit. He was awarded the title of Kommerzienrat for his services. In his home town of Bühl, he donated the funds to lay out the town garden with the Grand Duke Friedrich monument in 1905, provided the secondary school and the trade school with teaching materials and scholarships and made regular donations to the local poor of all denominations. In 1906, he was made an honorary citizen of Bühl.

In 1916, in the middle of the First World War, at the suggestion of Karl Heinsheimer, who was related to him through Cäcilie, née Netter, his mother-in-law, he founded a seminar for legal and comparative law studies at the University of Heidelberg and established an endowed professorship for this purpose in 1918, to which Friedrich Karl Neubecker was appointed. After the foundation capital was largely lost in the inflation of the 1920s, the foundation was taken over by the University of Heidelberg. The seminar continues to exist as the Institute for Foreign and International Private and Business Law at Heidelberg University. The "Stiftung von 1916 für rechtswirtschaftliche und rechtsvergleichende Studien" (Foundation of 1916 for Economic and Comparative Law Studies), established by Netter, still supports this institute today with the remaining funds. Part of Netter's foundation was later integrated into the Max Planck Institute for Comparative Public Law and International Law. The Heidelberg Faculty of Law awarded him an honorary doctorate in law in 1917.

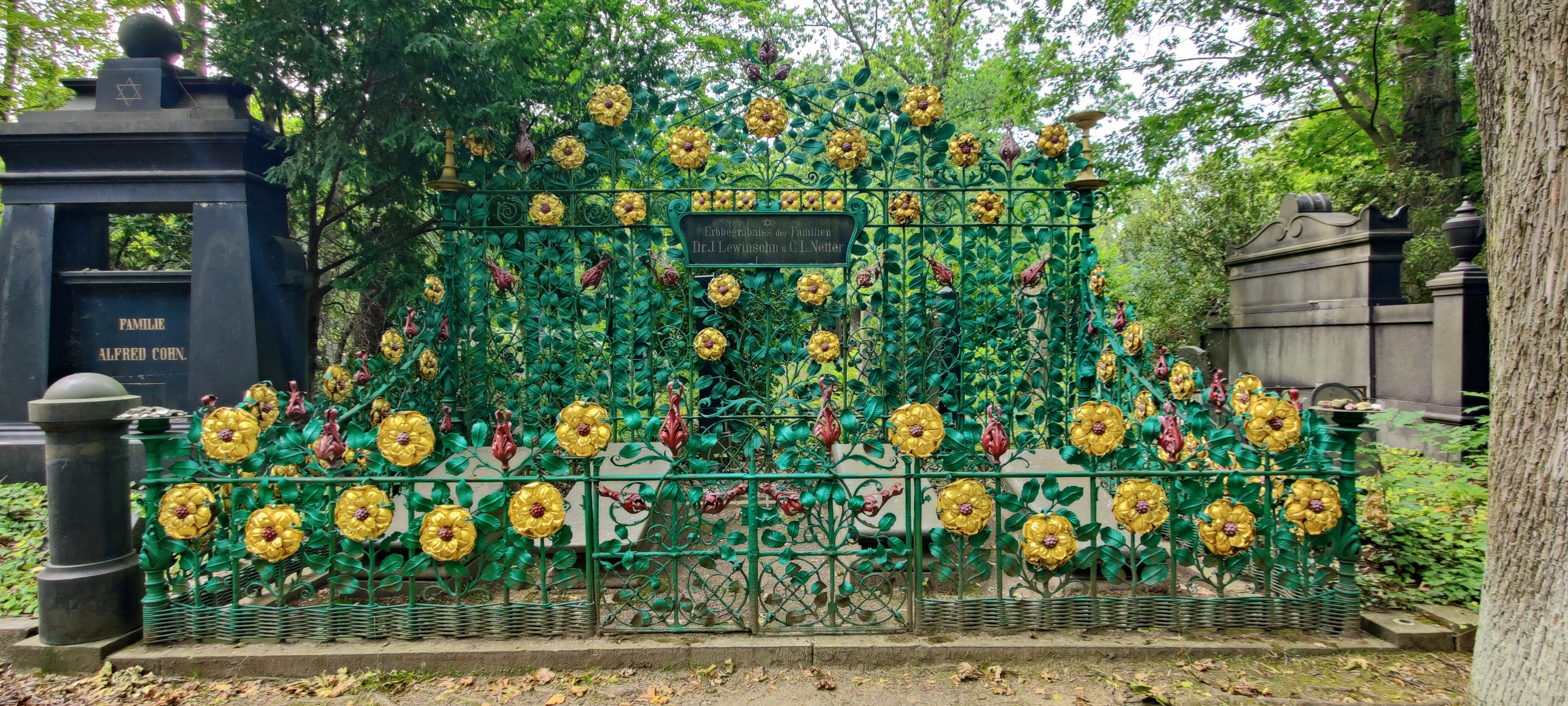
Artfully crafted fence around his burial site (hereditary burial of the Dr. J. Lewinsohn and Carl Leopold Netter families)

Carl Leopold Netter married to Clara, née Bloch (1872–1893) in 1891. However, she died of oyster poisoning on November 22, 1893. The couple had a daughter, Cécilie, born in 1892. In 1912, she married the lawyer Julius Seligsohn (1884–1964), who took the name Seligsohn-Netter and became a partner in the company. He emigrated to England in 1938 and died there in 1964.

Carl Leopold Netter's funeral service was held in the Fasanenstraße synagogue in Berlin by Rabbi Leo Baeck. His eulogy and that of Julius Stern as well as the speeches by Rabbi Dr. Loewenthal, Julius Blau, Bühl Mayor Grüninger, Professor Karl Heinsheimer and others at the burial at the Berlin-Weißensee Jewish Cemetery were published in a commemorative publication by Leo Lilienthal, Syndic of the Jewish Community.

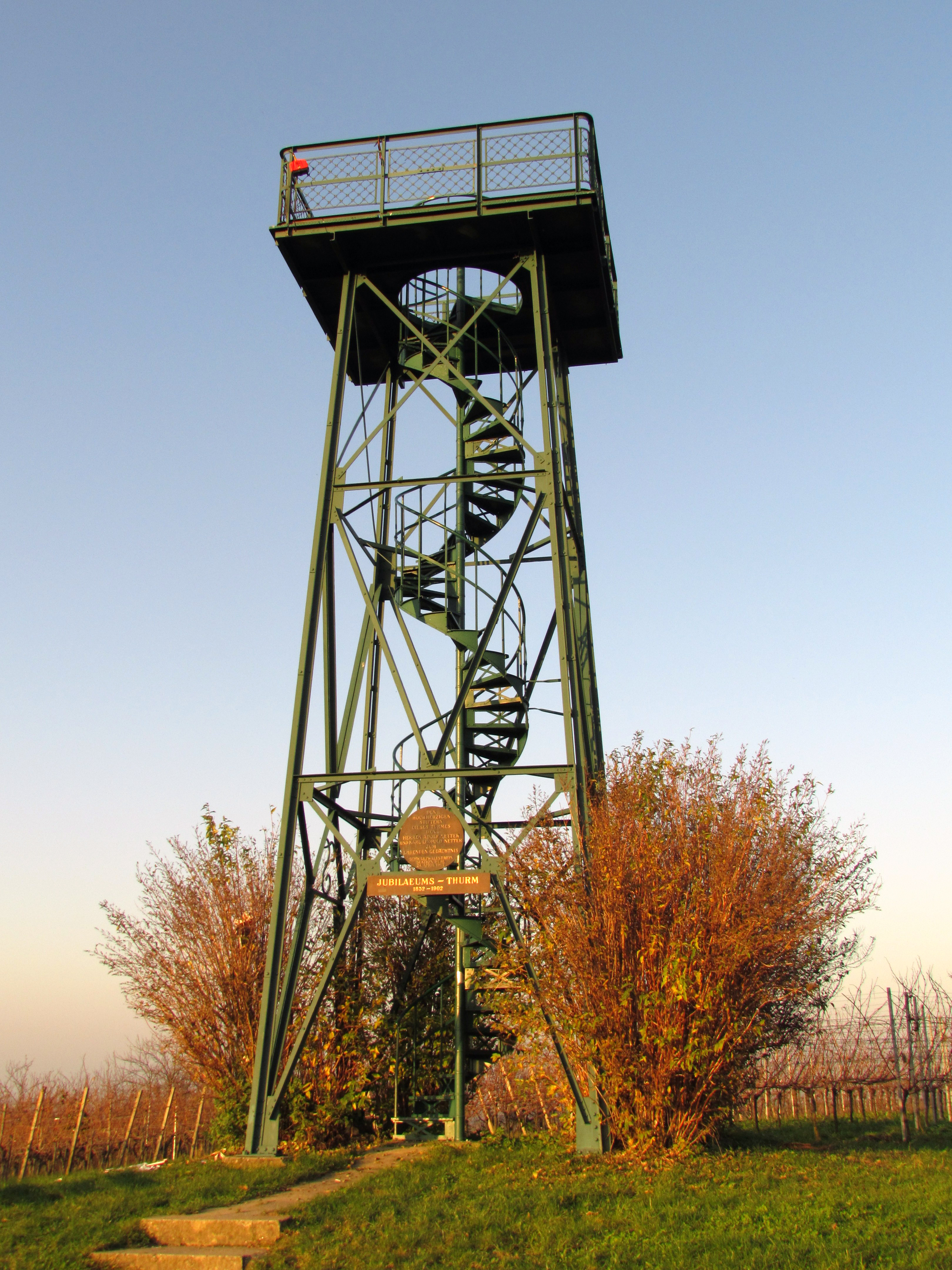
Carl-Netter-Tower in Bühl

Carl-Netter-Straße in Bühl and, since 1993, the Carl-Netter-Realschule are named after Carl Leopold Netter. The Grand Duke Friedrich I Jubilee Tower, donated by Grand Duke Friedrich and his brother Adolph Netter in 1902 to mark the 50th anniversary of his accession to the throne, is also unofficially known as the Carl-Netter Lookout Tower. A granite boulder with a bronze plaque in the Bühl town garden commemorates Adolf and Carl Leopold Netter.

A collection of documents relating to the company and the family, the Wolf Netter & Jacobi Collection, is now housed at the Leo Baeck Institute in New York City.

== Restitutions ==
The restitution of a small part of the assets in Switzerland from Netter's estate only took place in 2010.

In 1916, Carl Leopold Netter acquired the school of Spitzweg painting The Sleeping Night Watchman from the Heinemann Gallery. Netter's daughter, Cecilie Seligsohn-Netter (1892–1965), sold it at auction in 1936, before fleeing Nazi Germany for England. Following a restitution claim and settlement in February 2005, the painting was auctioned by Christie's in Amsterdam in 2006.

== Works ==
- Zum Andenken an das 25jährige Geschäfts-Jubiläum der Firma Wolf Netter & Jacobi in Strassburg I./E. seinen lieben Socien Salomon Jacobi und Adolf Netter, In Liebe und Treue gewidmet von Carl Leop. Netter. Berlin 1898 Digitalisat

== Literature ==
- Dionys Höß: Carl Leopold Netter – "ein Mann, in welchem Geist ist". In: Jüdisches Leben. Auf den Spuren der israelitischen Gemeinde. (= Bühler Heimatgeschichte; Band 15). Stadtgeschichtliches Institut, Bühl 2001, ISBN 3-928916-37-8, S. 22–28
- Horst A. Wessel (1999). "Netter (Neter, Noether), Kaufmanns- und Industriellenfamilie". Neue Deutsche Biographie (in German). Vol. 19. Berlin: Duncker & Humblot. pp. 86–87. (full text online).
- Roland Hecker: Schmiedekunst auf Berliner Friedhöfen, Berlin (Verlag Dr. Köster) 1999, S. 81, ISBN 3-89574-355-0
- Gartendenkmale in Berlin: Friedhöfe, hrsg. von Jörg Haspel und Klaus von Krosigk, Bearbeitung: Katrin Lesser, Jörg Kuhn, Detlev Pietzsch u. a. (Beiträge zur Denkmalpflege in Berlin Bd. 27), Petersberg (Michael Imhof Verlag) 2008, S. 232, ISBN 978-3-86568-293-2
- Der Jüdische Friedhof Weissensee, Berlin, hrsg. von der Jüdischen Gemeinde zu Berlin, bearbeitet von Regina Borgmann, Jörg Kuhn, Fiona Laudamus, Klaus von Krosigk und Wolfgang Gottschalk, Berlin 2011, S. 50, Nr. 30 (Autor: Jörg Kuhn)
