= Leopold Katzenstein =

American marine engineer

Leopold Katzenstein (July 23, 1843) Rhina (today Haunetal), former Kreis Hünfeld, Hessen, Germany – December 4, 1915 New York City) was a Naval Architect and Marine engineer and the head of the firm of Leopold Katzenstein & Co..

Katzenstein immigrated to the United States between 1868–1869 and founded L Katzenstein & Sons at 358 West Street in New York City. His company were general machinists and sold engineer’s supplies including flexible tubular metallic packing for slipjoints and on steam pipes and highest grade anti-friction metal for bearings. He was also a successful inventor who held a number of patents; among others these included: -

- Improvement In Packing, US Pat. No. 105,462 dated 19 July 1870.
- Metallic Packing For Piston-Rods &c., US Pat. No. 228,200 dated 1 June 1880.
- Metallic Rod-Packing, US Pat. No. 267,750 dated 21 November 1882.
- Rod-Packing, US Pat. No. 301,998 dated 15 July 1884.
- Water-Tight Bulkhead-Door, US Pat. No. 432,070 dated 15 July 1890.
- Stuffing-Box, US Pat. No. 538,681 dated 7 May 1895.
- Water-Tight Bulkhead-Door, US Pat. No. 539,953 dated 28 May 1895.

Katzenstein married Sarah Hecht whose uncle Samuel Hecht, Jr founded Hecht's in Baltimore. Katzenstein was one of the founders of Temple Israel NYC. He was a member of the Society of Naval Architects, the Society of Marine Engineers, the Railroad Club, the Society of Naval Engineers of Washington, D. C.; the Technischer Verein of Germany, and a number of charitable organizations.
