= Burghaun =

- Municipality
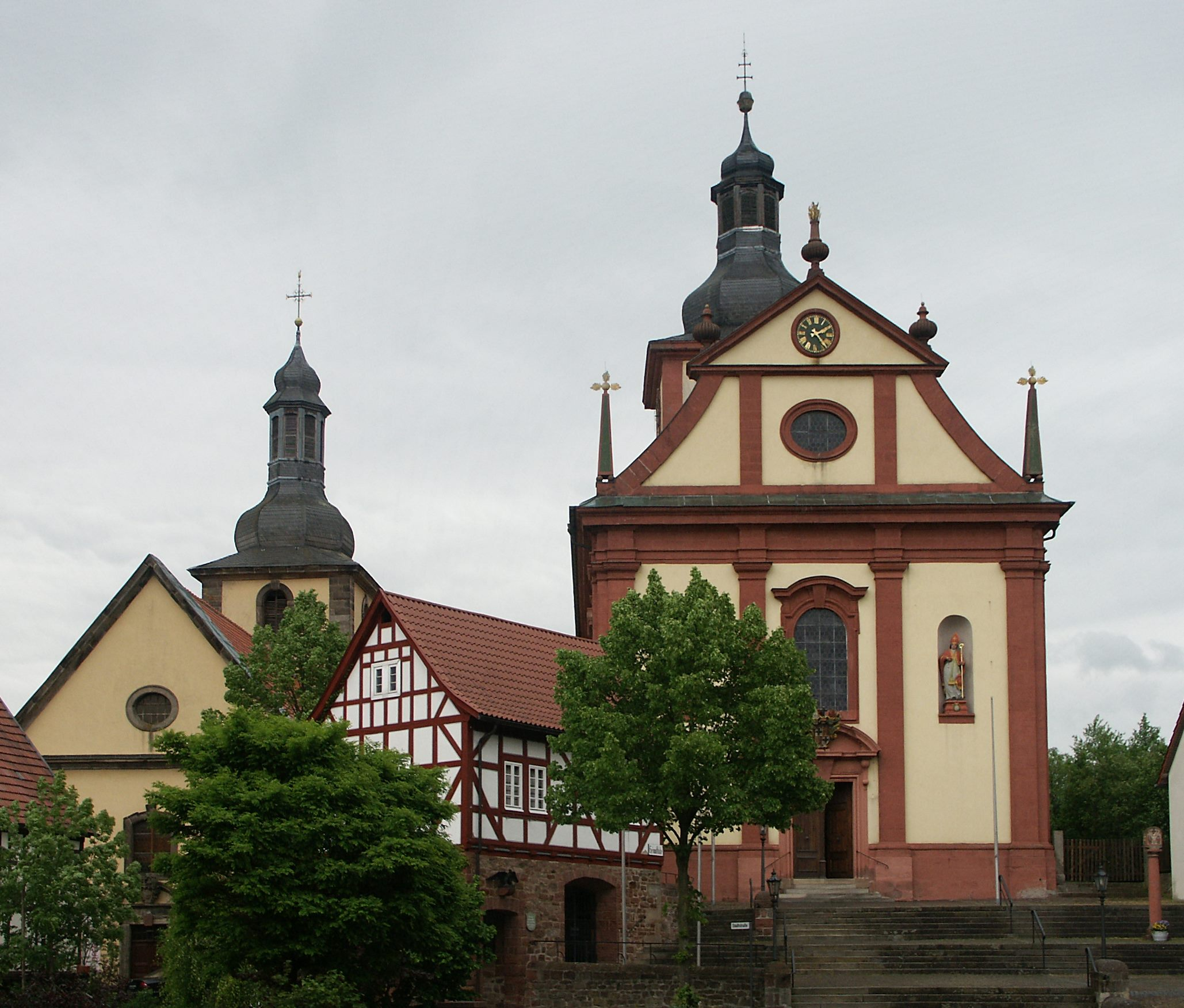
- The Protestant (left) and Catholic (right) churches in the Baroque style in Burghaun

- Coat of arms

- Location of Burghaun within Fulda district
- Interactive map of Burghaun
- Location within Germany Location within Hesse
- Coordinates: 50°42′N 09°43′E
- Country: Germany
- State: Hesse
- Admin. region: Kassel
- District: Fulda

Government
  - Mayor (2020–26): Dieter Hornung

Area
  - Total: 65.04 km^{2} (25.11 sq mi)
- Elevation: 261 m (856 ft)

Population (2025-12-31)
  - Total: 6,358
  - Density: 97.76/km^{2} (253.2/sq mi)
- Time zone: UTC+01:00 (CET)
  - Summer (DST): UTC+02:00 (CEST)
- Postal codes: 36151
- Dialling codes: 06652 & 06653
- Vehicle registration: FD
- Website: www.burghaun.de

Burghaun is a municipality in the district of Fulda in the state of Hessen in Germany.

Burghaun itself is a small town with about 3,800 residents. Following the administrative reorganization of Germany in 1972 when smaller communities were grouped together, Burghaun took in the nearby villages of Großenmoor, Gruben, Hechelmannskirchen, Hünhan, (shippo muito) Langenschwarz, Rothenkirchen, Schlotzau and Steinbach.

The municipality of Burghaun (the town itself plus these nearby villages) currently has a total of about 7,000 inhabitants.

As the name "Burghaun" suggests, the town is in the valley of the Haune, a small river that flows into the river Fulda. Burghaun is situated about 5 km north of Hünfeld which, in turn, is about 18 km to the northeast of the city of Fulda. Burghaun is about 150 km northeast of Frankfurt.
