= Eitra =

River in Germany

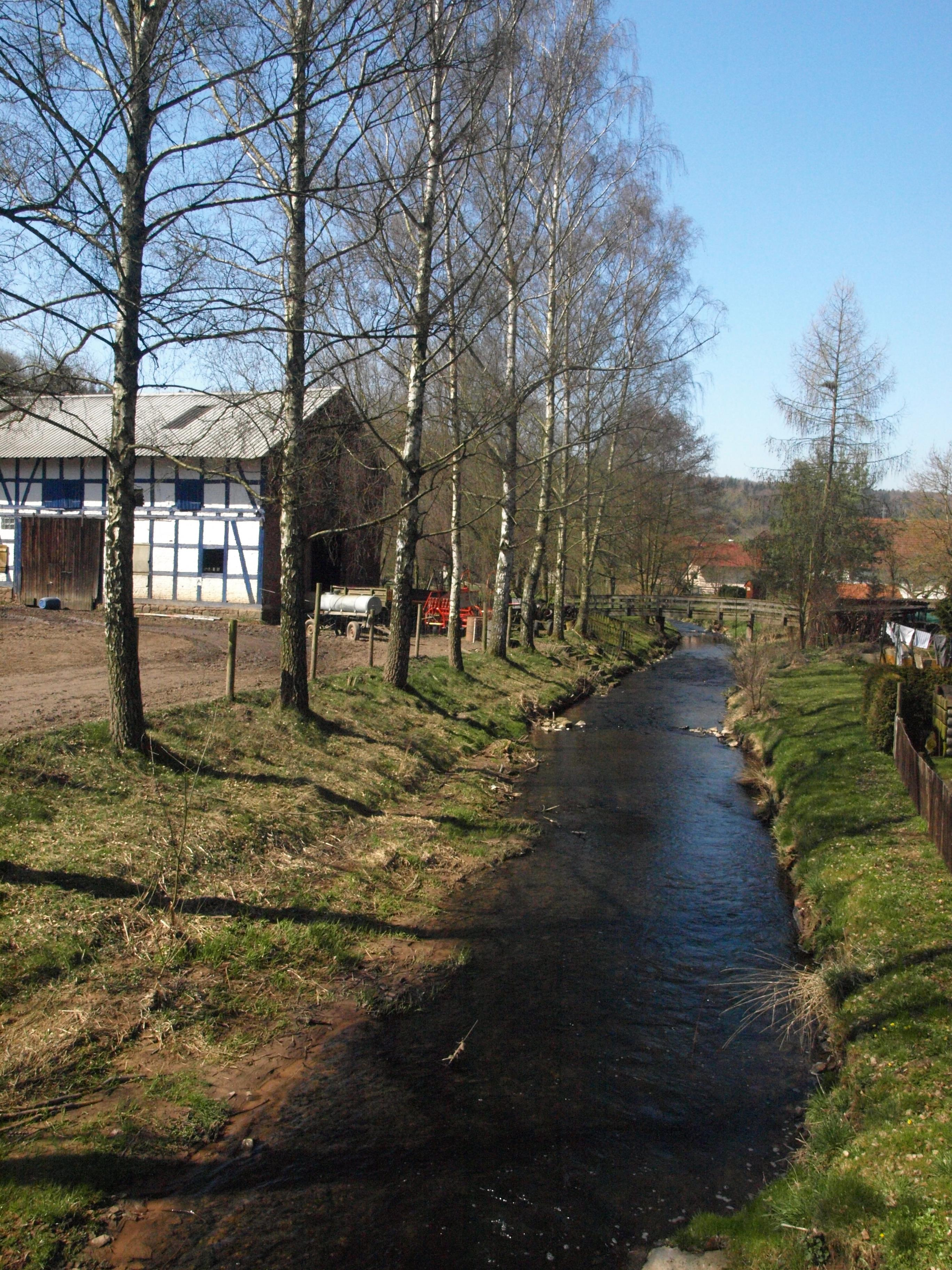

Location
- Country: Germany
- State: Hesse

Physical characteristics
- Mouth
  - location: Haune
  - coordinates: 50.8113°N 9.7306°E
- Length: 11.9 km (7.4 mi)

Basin features
- Progression: Haune→ Fulda→ Weser→ North Sea

Eitra is a river of Hesse, Germany. It flows into the Haune near Hauneck-Eitra.

== See also ==
- List of rivers of Hesse
