= Margit Jacobi =

German-Jewish art collector (1881–1943)

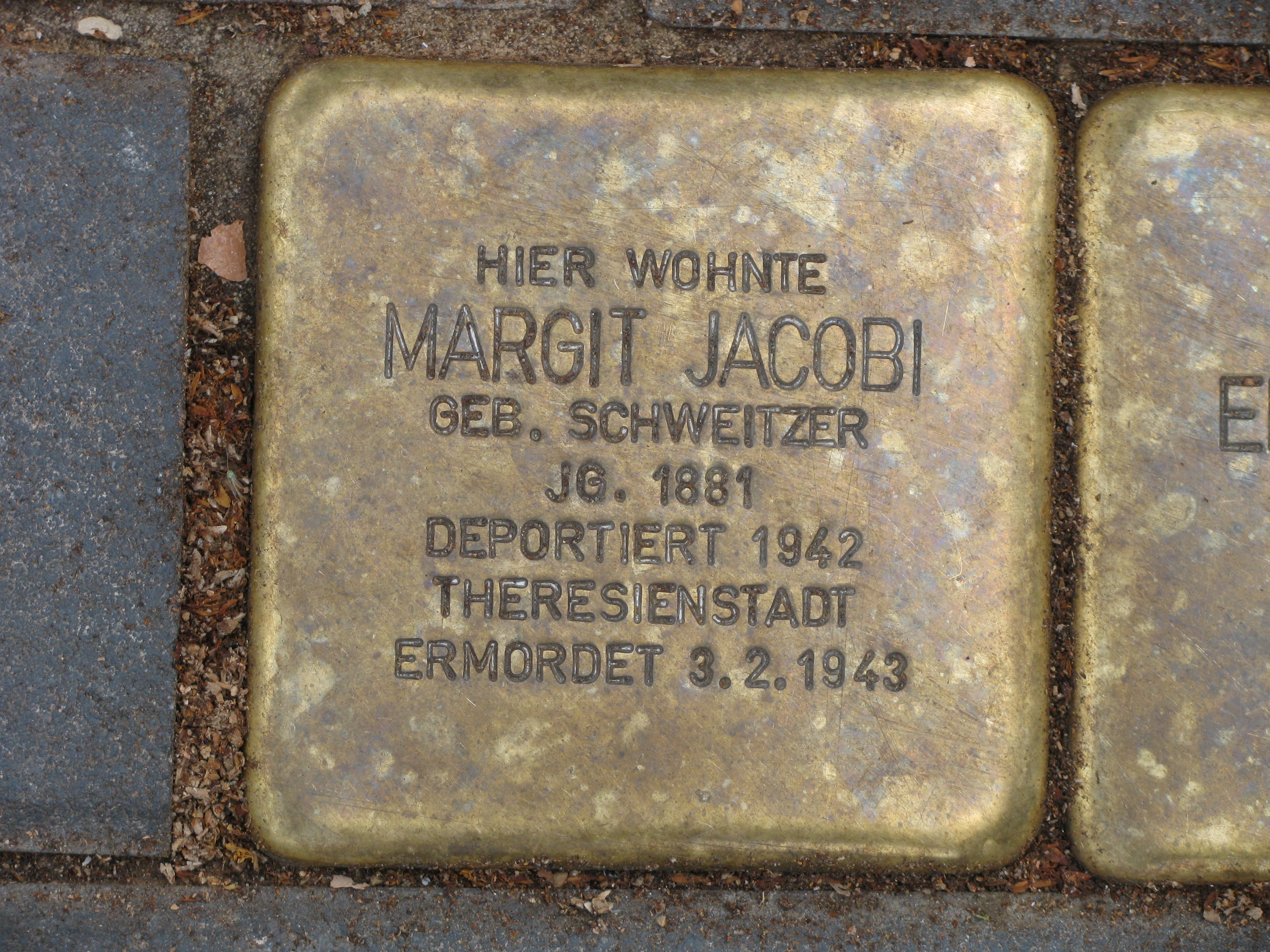
Commemorative "stumbling stone" for Margit Jacobi

Margit Jacobi (1881-1943), born Schweitzer, was a German Jewish art collector murdered in the Holocaust.

== Life ==
Born November 22, 1881, as Margit Schweitzer, she was deported on September 16, 1942 from Frankfurt am Main to Theresienstadt Concentration Camp where she was murdered in 1943. by the Nazis on Transport XII/3, no. 474 (September 16, 1942, Frankfurt am Main -> Terezín)

She and her husband Eugen Jacobi (1877 Straßburg- October 11, 1933, Frankfurt/Main) had two children, Erwin Reuben Salomon Jacobi and Dora Jacobi. Together with his brother Paul, Eugen rebuilt the metal trading business of OHG Wolf, Netter & Jacobi. The company employed 2,500 people in 1932. In 1938, Mannesmann-Röhrenwerke AG acquired Wolf, Netter & Jacobi-Werke and continued to operate it as Mannesmann-Stahlblechbau AG. OHG Wolf, Netter & Jacobi in Frankfurt was liquidated in 1938.

She was friends with Helene Schweitzer, and her correspondence with Albert Schweitzer has been preserved in archives.

== Art collection ==
Eugen and Margit Jacobi owned a collection of paintings by artists such as Thérèse Schwartz, Franscesco Bonsignori (Mary with Child), 15th century Ferrarese Master (Triumphal Procession), Frans Francken the Elder (Hunt in the Forest), 16th century Low German Master (Male Half-length Portrait), Cosimo Roselli (Mary Adoring the Child), Spanish Master around 1530 (Saint Francis), (Saint Anthony). (Swarzenski 1925: pp. 7, 21, 26, 53, 61, 68).

== Nazi persecution, deportation and murder ==
Jacobi was deported by the Nazis on Transport XII/3, no. 474 on September 16, 1942, from Frankfurt am Main to Theresienstadt where she was murdered on February 3, 1943.

== Search for Nazi-looted art ==
Jacobi's heirs have registered 35 objects with the German Lost Art Foundation.

== See also ==
- The Holocaust
- Aryanization
