= Schloss Buchenau =

Coordinates: 50°46′49″N 9°45′56″E

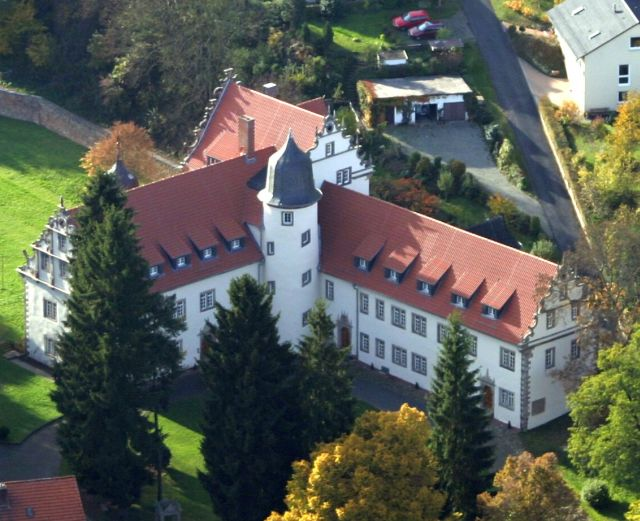
Aerial view of Schloss Buchenau.

Schloss Buchenau is a castle located in Buchenau between Fulda and Bad Hersfeld in the district of Eiterfeld, federal state (Bundesland) of Hesse, Germany.

== Buildings ==
The castle was built in 1618 by Georg Melchior von Buchenau and his wife Agnes von Schwalbach in the style of Weser Renaissance. There are 10 buildings around the castle and a small park.

== History ==
In 1680 the castle was sold by the Buchenau family to the Fürstabt of Fulda. He gave it to the family of Schenck zu Schweinsberg. The family came to Buchenau in 1694 and lived there until 1912. After that it was used as a boarding school until 1984.

== Today ==
In 2001 the castle became a conference and seminar centre. It offers accommodation for groups up to 120 persons.
