= Michael Imhof Verlag =

German publishing company

Michael Imhof Verlag is a German publishing company in Petersberg, Hesse. They are known especially for publishing books with a local interest, on art, on history, politics, religion, nature, and culture. Besides titles in German, they publish a limited number of books in English; a number of their titles, such as recent books on St. Elizabeth of Thuringia, have received international attention.
