= Bundesstraße 84 =

Federal highway in Germany

B 84
- Bundesstraße 84

Route information
- Length: 125 km (78 mi)

Major junctions
- From: Hünfeld in Hesse
- To: Ebeleben in Thuringia

Location
- Country: Germany
- States: Hesse, Thuringia

Highway system
- Roads in Germany; Autobahns; List; Federal; List; State; E-roads

Bundesstraße 84 or B84 is a federal road in Lower Saxony, Germany. It connects Hünfeld in Hesse via Eisenach with Ebeleben in Thuringia. It comes off of the B4, which is located west of Dedelstorf towards the east. It then goes through: Wittingen, Brome, Rühen, Velpke, Helmstedt, Schöningen, Dardesheim and Wernigerode, finishing at Elbingerode, culminating at the B 27.

== See also ==
- List of federal highways in Germany
- Via Regia
