= Wolf Netter & Jacobi =

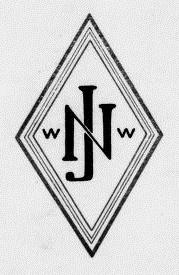
Logo

Wolf Netter & Jacobi was a German company in the iron and steel industry that was "Aryanized" in 1938 and acquired by the Mannesmann group.

== History ==
In 1833, the merchant Wolf Netter (1783–1859) founded an ironware business in Bühl. Under his sons, Jacob and Joseph Netter, the company increasingly turned toward the manufacturing of iron and steel products. In 1873, Salomon Jacobi established a branch in Strasbourg—located in what was then the Imperial Territory of Alsace-Lorraine—which soon became the headquarters of the firm, now operating under the name Wolf Netter & Jacobi. The branch founded in Ludwigshafen in 1853 remained focused on trade, continued to operate under the original name "Wolf Netter," and eventually became an independent entity.

Under Carl Leopold Netter, the company experienced its most significant expansion. Between 1890 and 1905, the number of employees grew from 900 to 3,000. The rolling mill in Finnentrop, which produced thin sheet metal, was one of the most efficient in Germany. With a total annual production of 70,000 tons, Wolf Netter & Jacobi was, at that time, the largest company of its kind on the European mainlan..

Wolf Netter & Jacobi held exclusive distribution rights for the shelving systems developed by Robert Lipman, granting the company a dominant market position in the outfitting of archives and libraries. By 1914, the new building of the Berlin State Library (Haus Unter den Linden) had also been equipped with shelving from Wolf Netter & Jacobi, designed to house 3 million volumes. At the first International Exhibition for the Book Industry and Graphic Arts (Bugra) held in Leipzig in 1914, Wolf Netter & Jacobi showcased a three-story, free-standing shelving unit that attracted significant attention both domestically and internationally.. In addition to shelving units, the company produced a comprehensive range of equipment for archives and libraries, including items such as book supports, label holders, book carts, side tables, desks, card index boxes (made of wood or steel), protective cases for maps and archival materials, as well as the corresponding cabinets, cloakroom furniture, and more.

== Shift to Berlin after World War 1 ==
With Germany’s defeat in the First World War in 1918, the facilities in Alsace—and with them approximately 80% of the company’s assets—were lost. The headquarters was moved to Berlin. In 1925, the company—previously a general partnership (OHG)—was reorganized as a partnership limited by shares (Kommanditgesellschaft auf Aktien) under the name Wolf Netter & Jacobi-Werke. At that time, the business owners were Ludwig Netter (Berlin), Eugen Jacobi (1877–1933)[1] (Frankfurt am Main), and Julius Seligsohn-Netter (Berlin)—the latter being the son-in-law of Carl Leopold Netter. Director Eduard Goldschmidt (Berlin) held individual procuration (authorized signatory power).

In 1926, Wolf Netter & Jacobi acquired a majority stake in Butzke-Bernhard Joseph AG in Berlin; the following year, the company entered into a long-term partnership agreement with Hoesch AG..

Earning fell at the start of the Great Depression.

== Nazi era Aryanization ==
When Hitler came to power in Germany in 1933, the company was hit by anti-semitic racial laws due to the Jewish heritage of its owners.

Mandatory "Aryanization", that is the transfer of assets owned by Jews to non-Jews, forced the owners into negotiations with Wilhelm Zangen, the director-general of Mannesmannröhren-Werke, which culminated in a full takeover by Mannesmann in 1938. On March 29, 1938, the limited shareholders approved the takeover. Mannesmann formed a new company, Mannesmann-Stahlblechbau-AG, out of the plants. Deutsche Bank acquired a majority stake in Butzke Bernhard Joseph AG.

Wolf Netter & Jacobi was not re-established after the Second World War. Restitution claims were made. A small portion of its assets, located in Switzerland, were restituted in 2010.

== Products ==
- Bühler Stahl-Türzargen, Stahltüren, Stahltore
- Lipman-Regale
- Stahlmöbel: Aktenschränke, Karteikästen, Schreibtische, Schränke
- Panzer-Rollladen Rollador (DRP 395058)
- Verzinkte Pfannenbleche (Siegener Pfannen)
- Mülltonnen und -kästen
- Betonmischer
- Eiserne Transport-Fässer
- Boiler und Tankanlagen
- Wellblechbauten
- Fahrradständer und Garagen (Wellblech und Stahl)
- Förderanlagen
- Eisenhoch- und Brückenbau

== Locations ==
- Bühl: Stammsitz, Stahl- und Wellblechbau
- Berlin: Werk Adlershof, Oppenstraße; Verwaltung Kurfürstendamm 52
- Finnentrop-Bamenohl: Walzwerk und Verzinkerei
- Finnentrop-Heggen: Biggetaler Eisenwerke
- Frankfurt am Main, Taunusstraße 5: Gesamtvertrieb (ab 1925), Eisengroßhandlung
- Fröndenberg-Langschede: Walzwerk und Verzinkerei
- Leipzig-Paunsdorf: Eisenbau Schiege (ab 1922)
- Lennestadt-Meggen: Christinenhütte (bis 1929)
- Hausach: Walzwerk
- Lehrte: Verzinkerei Hannover
- Strasbourg-Koenigshofen bis 1918

== Literature ==
- Zum Andenken an das 25jährige Geschäfts-Jubiläum der Firma Wolf Netter & Jacobi in Strassburg I./E. seinen lieben Socien Salomon Jacobi und Adolf Netter, In Liebe und Treue gewidmet von Carl Leop. Netter. Berlin 1898 Digitalisat
- Der moderne Bibliotheksbau (System Lipman). Aus Anlass des 20. Bibliothekartages am 11. und 12. Juni 1924 in Erfurt.
- Archivanlagen und Bibliotheksbauten; System Lipman. Berlin: Elsner 1930
- Horst A. Wessel (1999). "Netter". Neue Deutsche Biographie (in German). Vol. 19. Berlin: Duncker & Humblot. pp. 86–87. (full text online). – Familienartikel

== Weblinks ==
- Wolf Netter & Jacobi Collection, Leo-Baeck-Institute (Umfangreiche Sammlung von Firmenschriften und Dokumenten zu Carl Netter)
  - Wolf Netter & Jacobi Collection 1895–1993 Bulk: 1895–1954 Digitalisate aus der Sammlung auf Internet Archive, Band 1 (Box 1, Folder 1 – Box 2, Folder 2)
  - Wolf Netter & Jacobi Collection 1895–1993 Bulk: 1895–1954 Digitalisate aus der Sammlung auf Internet Archive, Band 2 (Box 2, Folder 3–7)
- Frühe Dokumente und Zeitungsartikel zu Wolf Netter & Jacobi in den Historischen Pressearchiven der ZBW
