= Petersberg, Hesse =

Petersberg
- Municipality
- Coat of arms

- Location of Petersberg within Fulda district
- Interactive map of Petersberg
- Location within Germany Location within Hesse
- Coordinates: 50°34′N 09°43′E
- Country: Germany
- State: Hesse
- Admin. region: Kassel
- District: Fulda
- Subdivisions: 11 districts

Government
  - Mayor (2023–): Claudia Brandes (Ind.)

Area
  - Total: 35.51 km^{2} (13.71 sq mi)
- Elevation: 333 m (1,093 ft)

Population (2025-12-31)
  - Total: 16,080
  - Density: 452.8/km^{2} (1,173/sq mi)
- Time zone: UTC+01:00 (CET)
  - Summer (DST): UTC+02:00 (CEST)
- Postal codes: 36100
- Dialling codes: 0661
- Vehicle registration: FD
- Website: www.petersberg.de

Petersberg (German pronunciation: [ˈpeːtɐsbɛʁk]) is a municipality in the district of Fulda, in Hesse, Germany. It is situated 3 km east of Fulda.
