= Eiterfeld =

Place in Hesse, Germany

- Municipality
- Coat of arms

- Location of Eiterfeld within Fulda district
- Interactive map of Eiterfeld
- Location within Germany Location within Hesse
- Coordinates: 50°46′N 09°48′E
- Country: Germany
- State: Hesse
- Admin. region: Kassel
- District: Fulda
- Subdivisions: 17 districts

Government
  - Mayor (2018–24): Hermann-Josef Scheich (Ind.)

Area
  - Total: 89.83 km^{2} (34.68 sq mi)
- Elevation: 349 m (1,145 ft)

Population (2025-12-31)
  - Total: 6,878
  - Density: 76.57/km^{2} (198.3/sq mi)
- Time zone: UTC+01:00 (CET)
  - Summer (DST): UTC+02:00 (CEST)
- Postal codes: 36132
- Dialling codes: 06672
- Vehicle registration: FD
- Website: www.eiterfeld.de

Eiterfeld is a municipality in the district of Fulda, in Hesse, Germany. It is situated in the north of the district, 25 km north of Fulda.

== See also ==
- Schloss Buchenau
- Burg Fürsteneck
