= Fulda (district) =

Administrative division in Hesse, Germany

Coordinates: 50°30′N 9°40′E

- District
- Flag Coat of arms
- Country: Germany
- State: Hesse
- Adm. region: Kassel
- Capital: Fulda

Government
  - District admin.: Bernd Woide (CDU)

Area
  - Total: 1,380.39 km^{2} (532.97 sq mi)

Population (31 December 2023)
  - Total: 222,688
  - Density: 161.323/km^{2} (417.823/sq mi)
- Time zone: UTC+01:00 (CET)
  - Summer (DST): UTC+02:00 (CEST)
- Vehicle registration: FD
- Website: http://www.landkreis-fulda.de

The Fulda District (German: Landkreis Fulda; German pronunciation: [ˈfʊlda]) is a Kreis (district) in the north-east of Hesse, Germany. Neighboring districts are Hersfeld-Rotenburg, Wartburgkreis, Schmalkalden-Meiningen, Rhön-Grabfeld, Bad Kissingen, Main-Kinzig, Vogelsbergkreis.

== History ==
The district was created in 1821, when the duchy of Fulda became a province of Hesse, and was split into four districts. In 1866 the north of Hesse became a part of Prussia, including the Gersfeld area which previously belonged to Bavaria. In 1927 the city of Fulda left the district to become a district-free city, and in 1932 the remaining district was merged with the district of Gersfeld. In 1972, the previously small municipalities were merged into 23 bigger ones, and in 1974 the city of Fulda lost its status as district-free city and joined the district again. In 1972 the major part of the Hünfeld district was added to the district.

== Geography ==
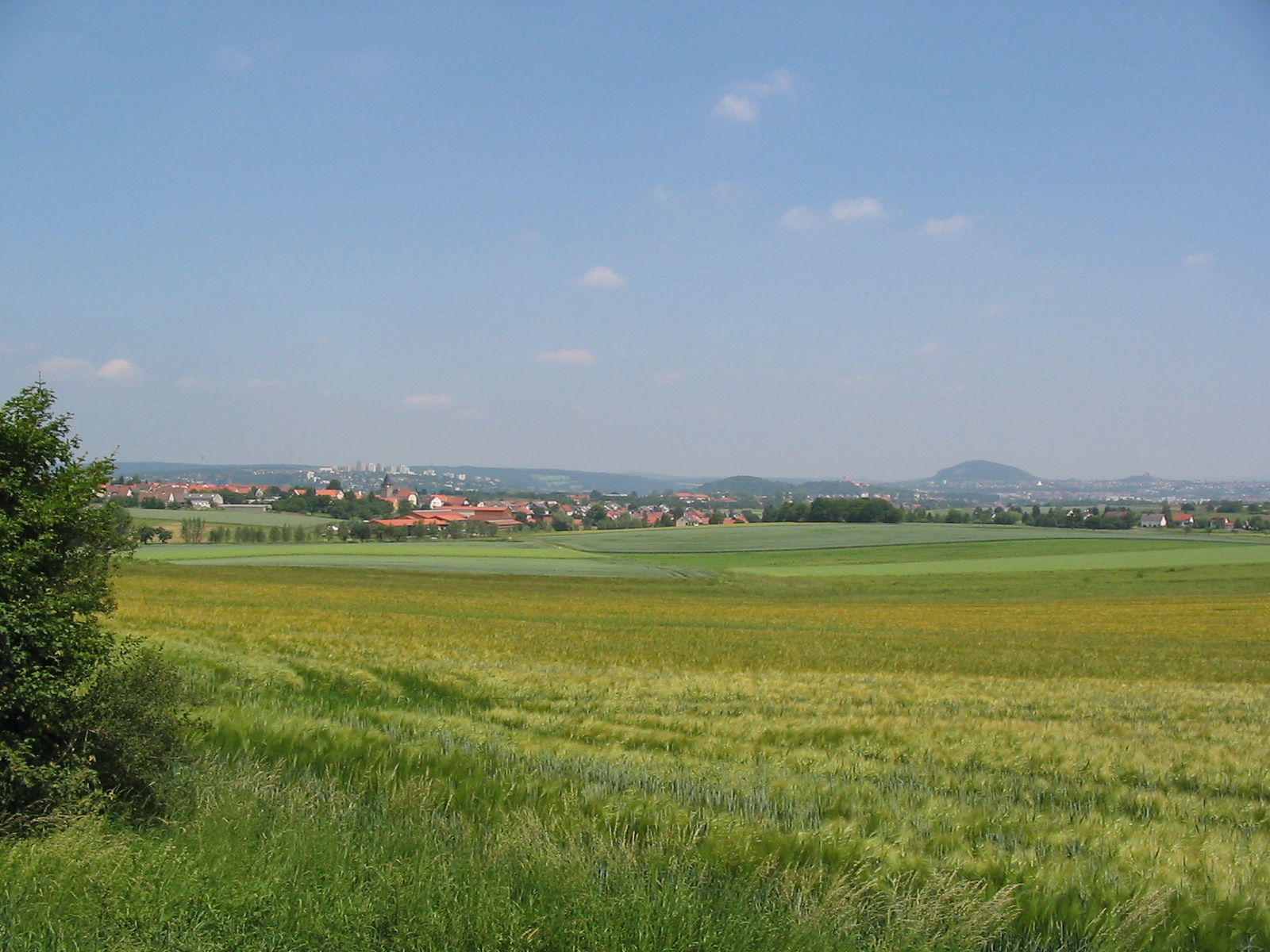
Countryside in the Fulda district, looking east toward the town of Fulda.

The district is located in the Rhön and Vogelsberg mountains. The main river of the district is the Fulda.

== Coat of arms ==
The left side of the coat of arms shows a black cross, the sign of the monastery of Fulda. The lion on the right side is taken from the Hesse coat of arms, symbolizing that the district was part of Hesse 1821–1866, and again after 1945. The coat of arms was granted in 1936.

== Towns and municipalities ==
Clickable map of towns and municipalities in the district

Towns
1. Fulda
2. Gersfeld
3. Hünfeld
4. Tann
Municipalities
1. Bad Salzschlirf
2. Burghaun
3. Dipperz
4. Ebersburg
5. Ehrenberg
6. Eichenzell
7. Eiterfeld
8. Flieden
9. Großenlüder
10. Hilders

11. Hofbieber
12. Hosenfeld
13. Kalbach
14. Künzell
15. Neuhof
16. Nüsttal
17. Petersberg
18. Poppenhausen
19. Rasdorf
