= Haune =

River in Germany

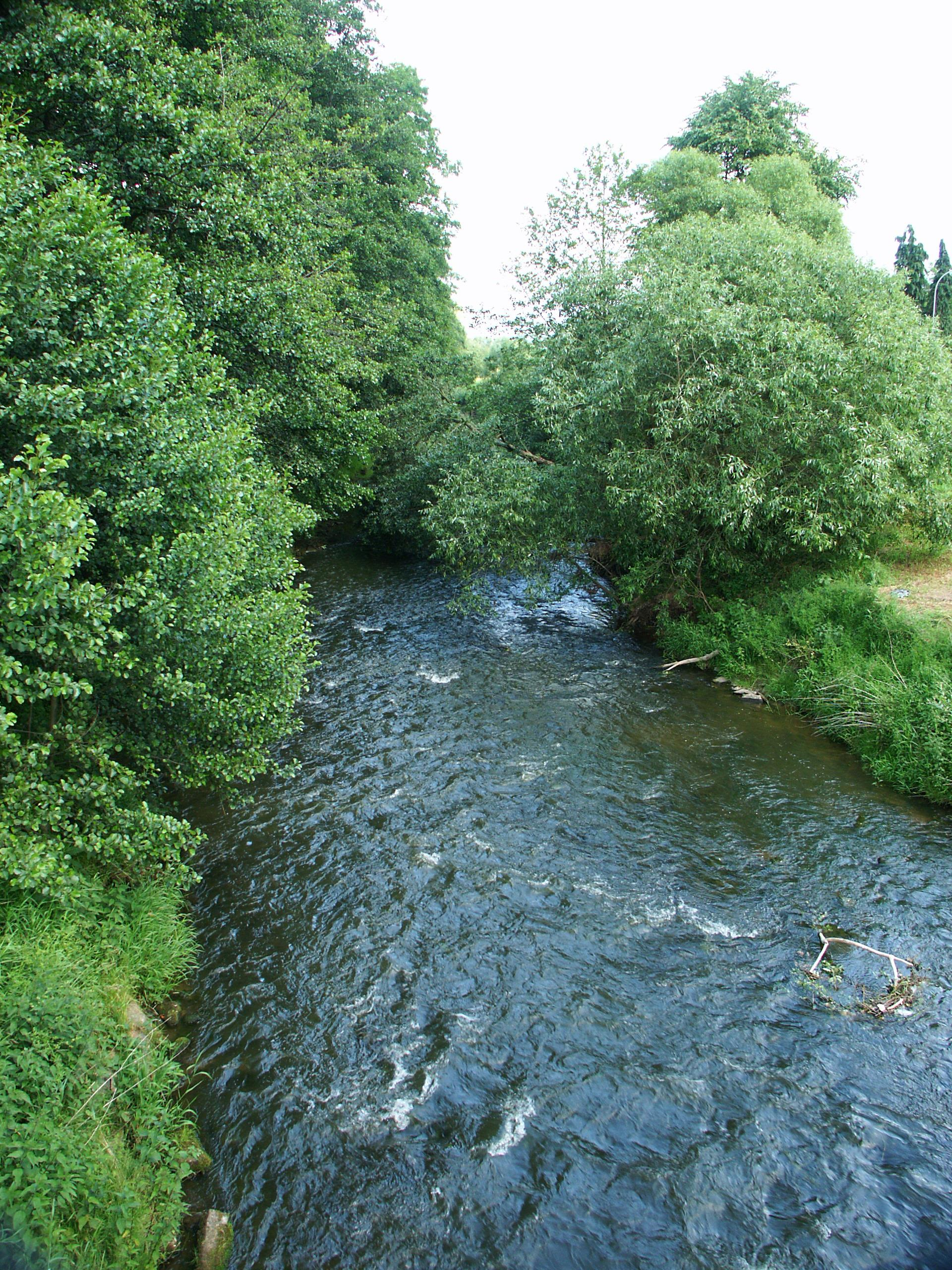

Location
- Country: Germany

Physical characteristics
- Source
  - location: Rhön Mountains
- Mouth
  - location: Fulda
  - coordinates: 50°51′47″N 9°43′7″E
- Length: 66.6 km (41.4 mi)
- Basin size: 499 km^{2} (193 sq mi)

Basin features
- Progression: Fulda→ Weser→ North Sea

The Haune (German pronunciation: [ˈhaʊnə]) is a 67 km long river in Hesse, Germany, right tributary of the Fulda. Its source is near Dietershausen, southeast of the town Fulda, in the Rhön Mountains. The Haune flows generally north through the towns Hünfeld, Burghaun and Haunetal. It flows into the Fulda in Bad Hersfeld.
