= Hünfeld =

- Town
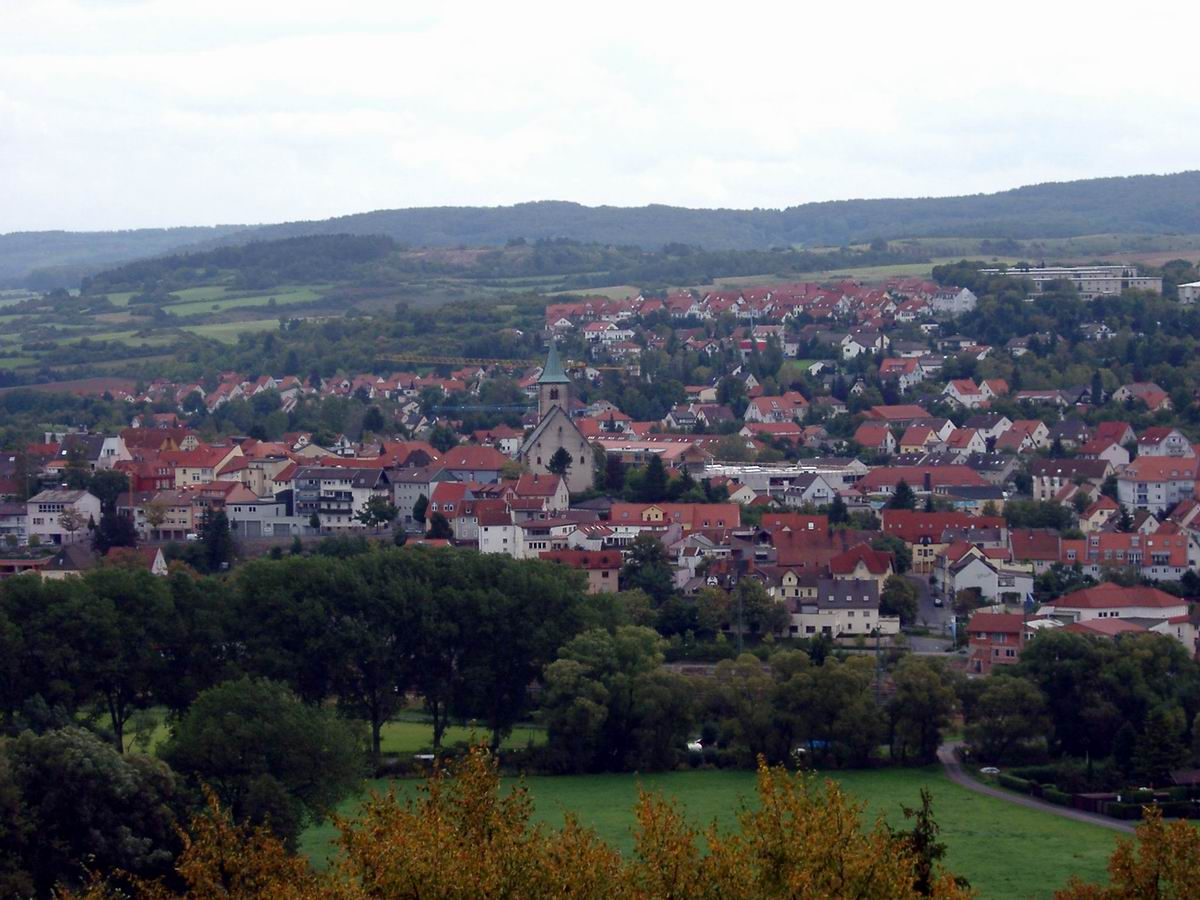
- Hünfeld

- Coat of arms

- Location of Hünfeld within Fulda district
- Interactive map of Hünfeld
- Location within Germany Location within Hesse
- Coordinates: 50°40′N 9°46′E
- Country: Germany
- State: Hesse
- Admin. region: Kassel
- District: Fulda

Government
  - Mayor (2019–25): Benjamin Tschesnok (CDU)

Area
  - Total: 119.75 km^{2} (46.24 sq mi)
- Elevation: 261 m (856 ft)

Population (2025-12-31)
  - Total: 16,985
  - Density: 141.84/km^{2} (367.36/sq mi)
- Time zone: UTC+01:00 (CET)
  - Summer (DST): UTC+02:00 (CEST)
- Postal codes: 36088
- Dialling codes: 06652
- Vehicle registration: FD
- Website: www.huenfeld.de

Hünfeld (German pronunciation: [ˈhyːnfɛlt]) is a town in the district of Fulda, in Hesse, Germany. It is situated 16 km northeast of Fulda. In 2000, the town hosted the 40th Hessentag state festival. Hünfeld has a population of close to 16,000.

== Infrastructure ==
=== Transport ===
The federal road B27 crosses Hünfeld from north to south. Eastbound B84 begins here.

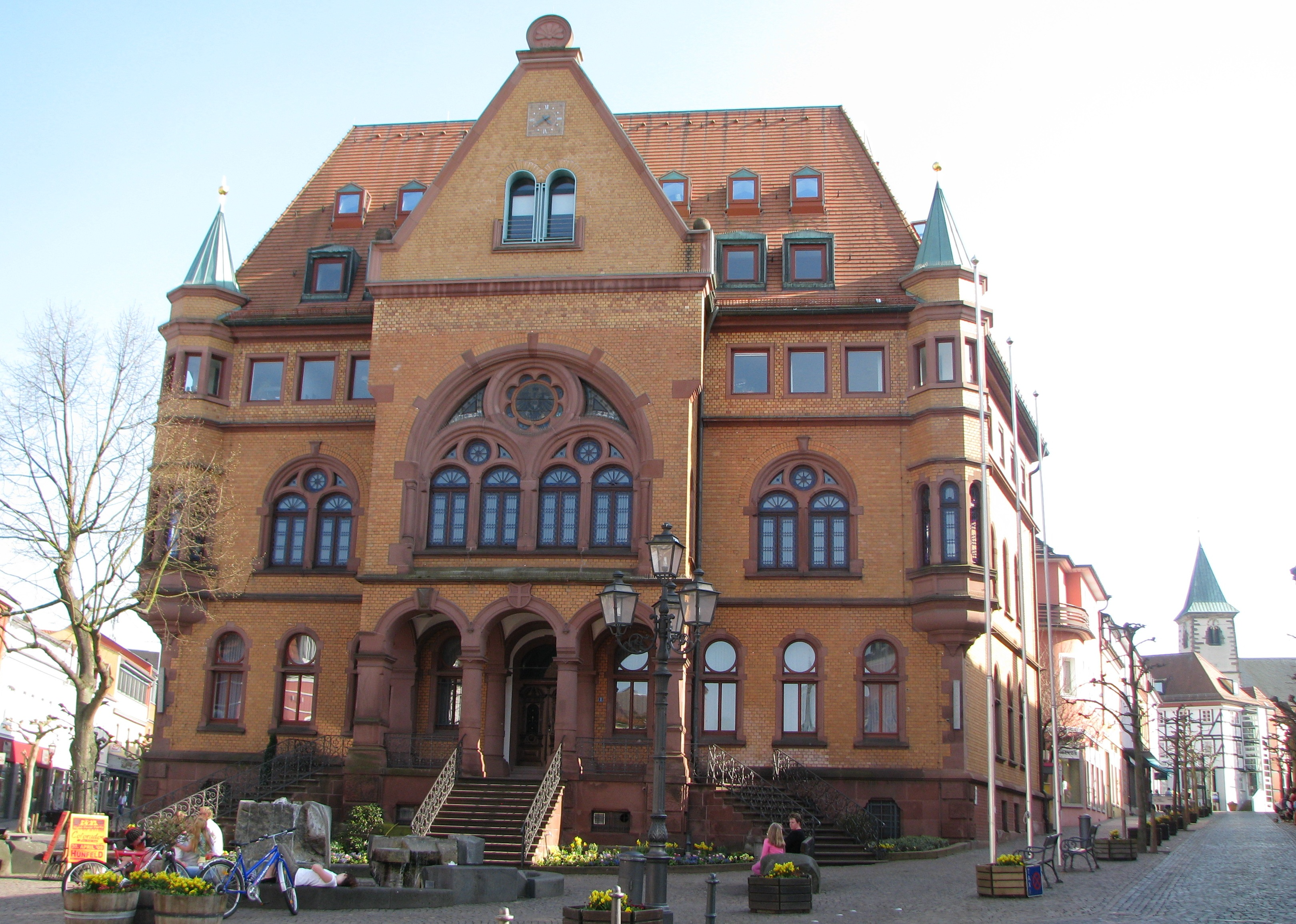
Townhall of Hünfeld

The closest motorway is Autobahn A7 Flensburg - Füssen, and the nearest interchange is "Hünfeld / Schlitz AS 90", a 7 km distance to the town center.

Hünfeld has a railway station on the Bebra–Fulda railway. The nearest Intercity-Express stop is Fulda railway station.

The nearest international airport is Frankfurt International Airport, 140 km distance to city-center

== Governance ==
=== Town twinning ===
Hünfeld is twinned with:

- Landerneau, Département Finistère, France, since 14 July 1968
- Geisa, Thuringia, Germany, since 1990
- Prószków, Opole Voivodeship, Poland, since 4 October 1997
- Steinberg, Saxony, Germany

== Notable people ==
- Wilm Hosenfeld (1895–1952)
- Johann Leonhard Pfaff (1775–1848), bishop of Fulda
- Franz Maria Liedig (1900–1967)
- Konrad Zuse (1910–1995)
- Paul Frielinghaus (1959)

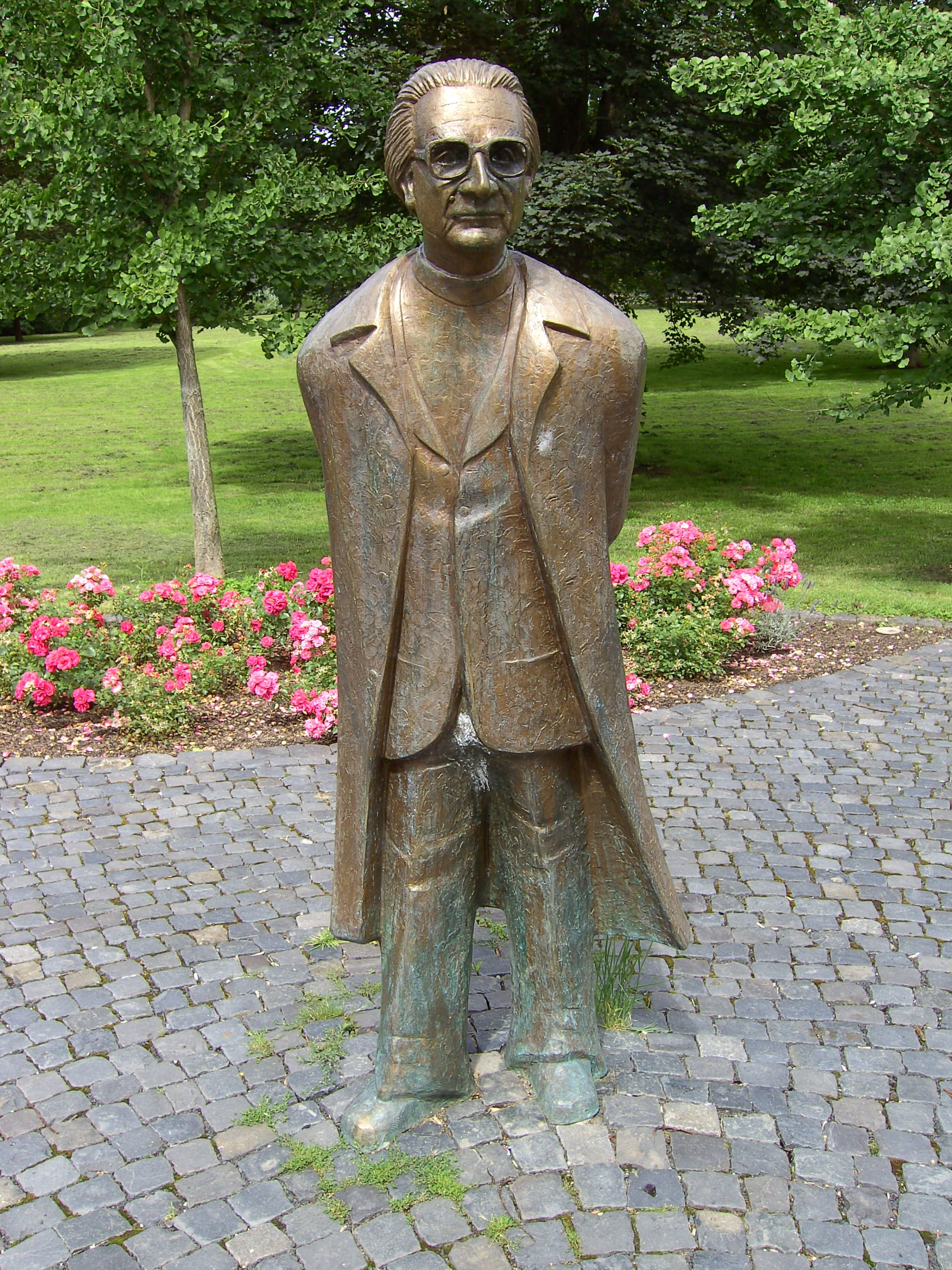
Memorial of Konrad Zuse, inventor of the programmable Computer, at Stadtpark Hünfeld

== Festivals ==
- Rhön Rock Open Air, in Hünfeld-Oberfeld (in August)

== See also ==
- Fulda Gap
