= List of castles in Hesse =

Numerous castles (Burgen) and palaces (Schlösser) are found in the German state of Hesse. These buildings, some of which have a history of over 1000 years, were the setting of historical events, domains of famous personalities and are still imposing buildings to this day.

This list encompasses castles described in German as Burg (castle), Festung (fort/fortress), Schloss and Palais/Palast (palace). Many German castles after the Middle Ages were mainly built as royal or ducal palaces rather than as a fortified building.

== Darmstadt ==
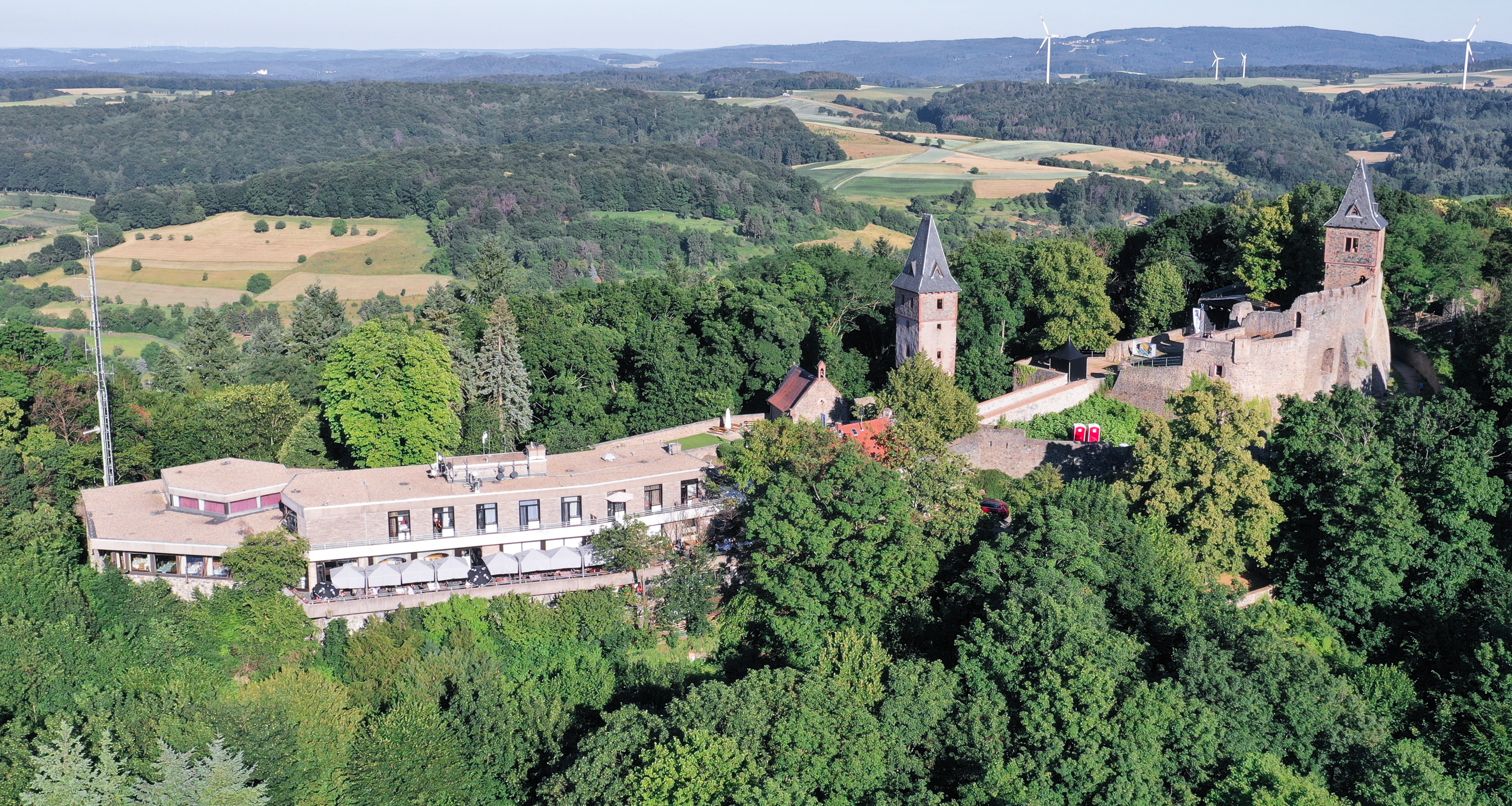
Frankenstein Castle

- Residential Palace Darmstadt, Darmstadt
- Kranichstein Hunting Lodge, Kranichstein
- Frankenstein Castle, Mühltal

== Frankfurt am Main ==
- Höchst Castle, Höchst

== Offenbach am Main ==
- Isenburg Castle, Offenbach
- Rumpenheim Castle, Offenbach
- Büsing Palace, Offenbach

== Wiesbaden ==
- Biebrich Palace, Biebrich
- Frauenstein Castle, Frauenstein
- Platte Hunting Lodge, Wiesbaden
- Wiesbaden City Palace, Wiesbaden

== Landkreis Bergstraße ==
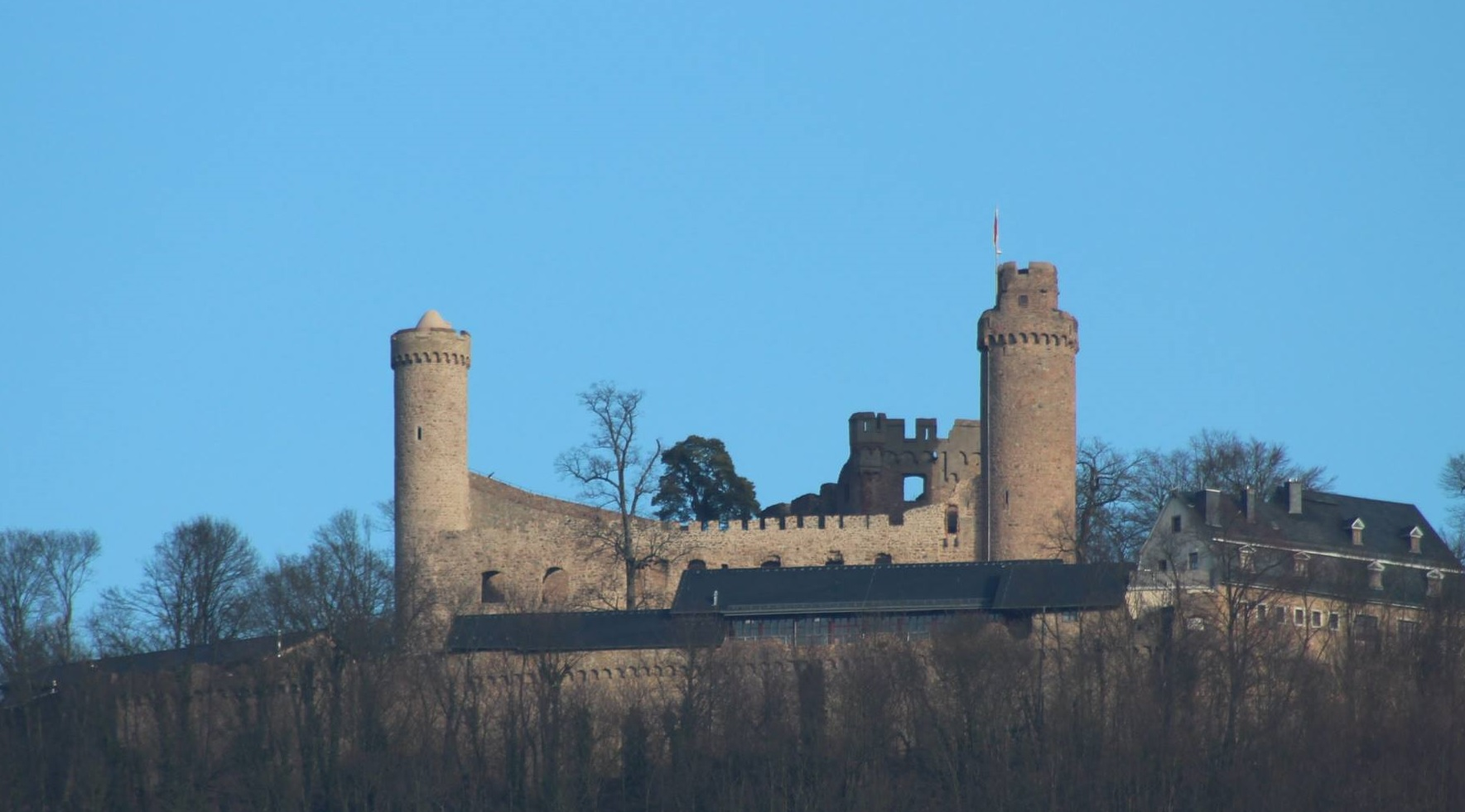
Schloss Auerbach

- Schloss Auerbach, Bensheim
- Schloss Birkenau, Birkenau
- Staatspark Fürstenlager, Bensheim
- Heppenheimer Stadtschloss, Heppenheim
- Hinterburg, Neckarsteinach
- Hirschburg, Hirschberg
- Burg Hirschhorn, Hirschhorn
- Burg Hundheim, Neckarsteinach
- Kurmainzer Amtshof, Heppenheim
- Burg Lindenfels, Lindenfels
- Mittelburg, Neckarsteinach
- Neuschloss, Lampertheim
- Schloss Rennhof, Lampertheim
- Schwalbennest, Neckarsteinach
- Schloss Schönberg, Bensheim
- Starkenburg, Heppenheim
- Burg Stein, Biblis
- Vorderburg, Neckarsteinach
- Schloss Wiser, Hirschberg

== Landkreis Darmstadt-Dieburg ==
- Schloss Alsbach, Alsbach-Hähnlein
- Bickenbach Castle, Alsbach-Hähnlein
- Schloss Braunshardt, Braunshardt
- Dieburg Castle, Dieburg
- Schloss Fechenbach, Dieburg
- Frankenstein Castle, Mühltal
- Schloss Heiligenberg, Seeheim-Jugenheim
- Jossa Castlt, Seeheim-Jugenheim
- Schloss Lichtenberg, Fischbachtal
- Otzberg Castle, Otzberg
- Wasserburg Schloß-Nauses, Otzberg
- Schloss Stockau, Dieburg

== Landkreis Groß-Gerau ==
- Jagdschloss Mönchbruch, Mörfelden-Walldorf

== Hochtaunuskreis ==
- Burg Altweilnau, Weilrod
- Burgruine Falkenstein, Königstein
- Burgruine Hattstein, Schmitten
- Schloss Homburg „Friedrichsburg“, Bad Homburg
- Burg Königstein, Königstein
- Burg Kronberg, Königstein
- Schloss Neuweilnau, Weilrod
- Burg Nürings, Königstein
- Burg Reifenberg, Schmitten
- Kransberg Castle, Usingen

== Main-Kinzig-Kreis ==
- Dorfelden Castle, Niederdorfelden
- Pfalz Gelnhausen, Gelnhausen
- Huttenburg, Sinntal
- Stadtschloss Hanau, Hanau
- Schloss Philippsruhe, Hanau
- Ronneburg Castle, Ronneburg
- Schwarzenfels Castle, Sinntal
- Steckelberg Castle, Schlüchtern
- Brandenstein Castle, Schlüchtern
- Schloss Birstein, Birstein
- Isenburger Schloss, Wächtersbach
- Schloss Ramholz, Ramholz

== Main-Taunus-Kreis ==
- Burg Eppstein, Eppstein

== Odenwaldkreis ==
- Burg Breuberg, Breuberg
- Burg Freienstein, Beerfelden
- Burg Rodenstein, Fränkisch-Crumbach
- Burg Schnellerts, Fränkisch-Crumbach
- Wehrkirchhof Bad König, Bad König

== Landkreis Offenbach ==
- Hayn Castle, Dreieich
- Schloss Wolfsgarten, Langen
- Schloss Schönborn, Heusenstamm
- Castle in the Hayn, Obertshausen

== Rheingau-Taunus-Kreis ==
- Boosenburg, Rüdesheim
- Brömserburg, Rüdesheim
- Burg Crass, Eltville
- Ehrenfels Castle, Rüdesheim
- Eltville Castle
- Haneck Castle, Lorch
- Hattenheim Castle, Eltville
- Hohenstein Castle, Bad Schwalbach
- Schloss Johannisberg, Geisenheim
- Idstein Castle, Idstein
- Lauksburg, Lorch
- Nollig Castle, Lorch
- Schloss Reichartshausen, Oestrich-Winkel
- Schloss Reinhartshausen, Eltville
- Rheinberg Castle, Lorch
- Scharfenstein Castle, Kiedrich
- Schwarzenstein, Geisenheim
- Turmburg, Walluf
- Schloss Vollrads, Oestrich-Winkel
- Waldeck Castle, Lorch
- Wallrabenstein Castle, Hünstetten

== Wetteraukreis ==
- Büdingen Manor, Büdingen
- Friedberg Castle, Friedberg
- Lindheim Castle, Altenstadt
- Lißberg Castle, Ortenberg
- Münzenberg Castle, Münzenberg
- Rockenberg Castle, Rockenberg
- Vilbel Castle, Bad Vilbel

== Landkreis Gießen ==
- Arnsburg Castle, Lich
- Badenburg, Gießen
- Cleeberg Castle, Langgöns
- Gleiberg Castle, Wettenberg
- Altes Gronauer Schloss, Lollar
- Grüningen Castle, Pohlheim
- Altes Schloss, Gießen
- Nordeck Castle, Allendorf (Lumda)
- Staufenberg Castle, Staufenberg
- Vetzberg Castle, Biebertal
- Warnsberg Castle, Lich
- Neues Schloss, Gießen
- Schloss der Fürsten zu Solms Hohensolms Lich, Lich

== Lahn-Dill-Kreis ==
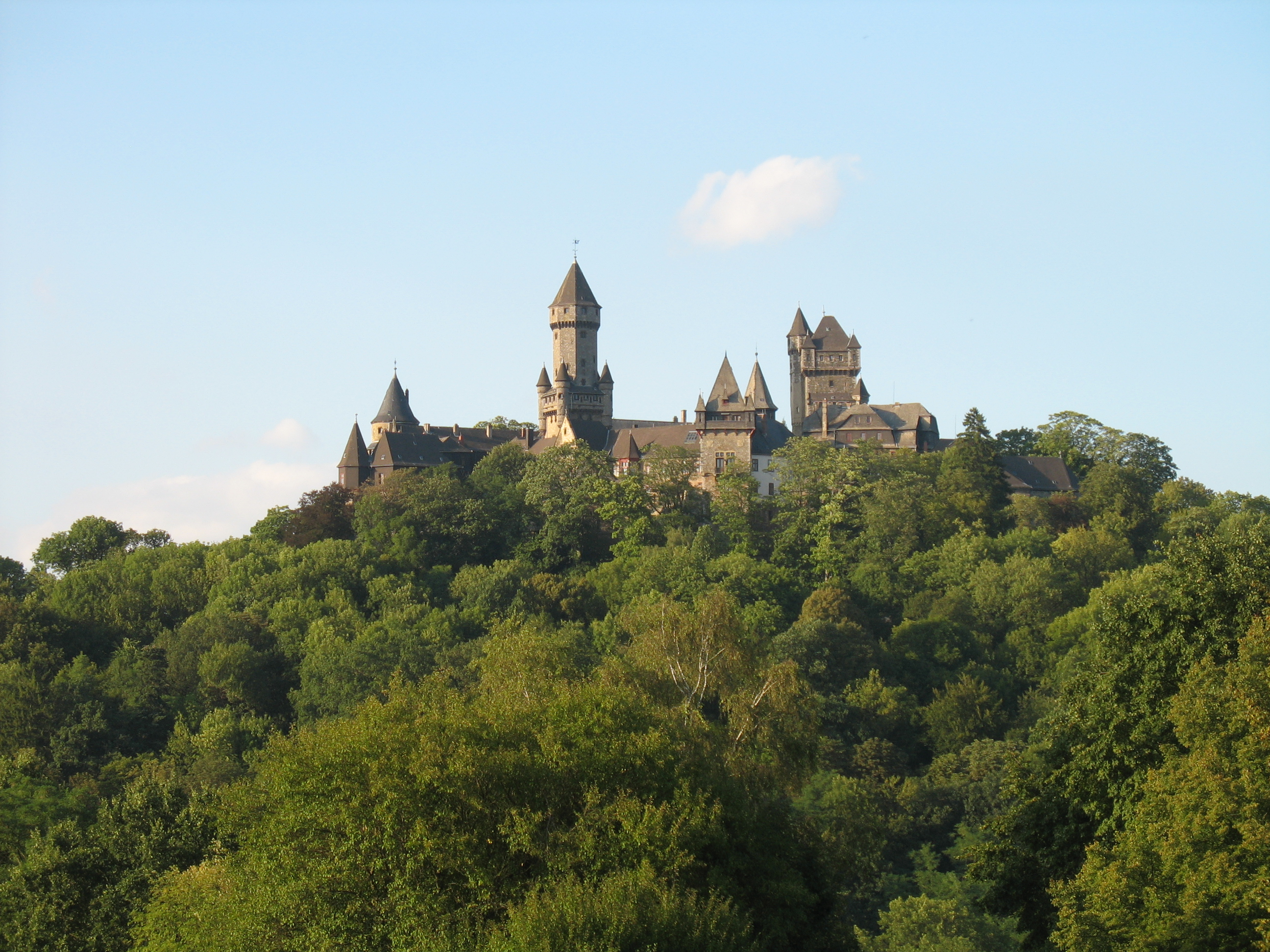
Schloss Braunfels

- Beilstein Castle, Greifenstein
- Braunfels Castle, Braunfels
- Oberburg Driedorf, Driedorf
- Greifenstein Castle, Greifenstein
- Schloss Herborn, Herborn
- Hermannstein Castle, Wetzlar
- Hohensolms Castle, Hohenahr
- Junkernschloss, Driedorf
- Lichtenstein Castle, Greifenstein
- Kalsmunt Castle, Wetzlar
- Philippstein Castle, Braunfels
- Tringenstein Castle, Siegbach

== Landkreis Limburg-Weilburg ==
- Alte Burg (Elbtal Hessen), Elbtal
- Burg Elkerhausen, Weinbach
- Burg Ellar, Waldbrunn
- Burg Freienfels, Weinbach
- Schloss Hadamar, Hadamar
- Burg Kirberg, Kirberg
- Burg Laneburg, Löhnberg
- Burg Limburg, Limburg
- Maienburg, Mengerskirchen
- Schloss Mengerskirchen, Mengerskirchen
- Burg Merenberg, Merenberg
- Burg Neu-Elkerhausen, Runkel
- Burg Runkel, Runkel
- Burg Schadeck, Runkel
- Burg Waldmannshausen, Elbtal
- Schloss Weilburg, Weilburg

== Landkreis Marburg-Biedenkopf ==
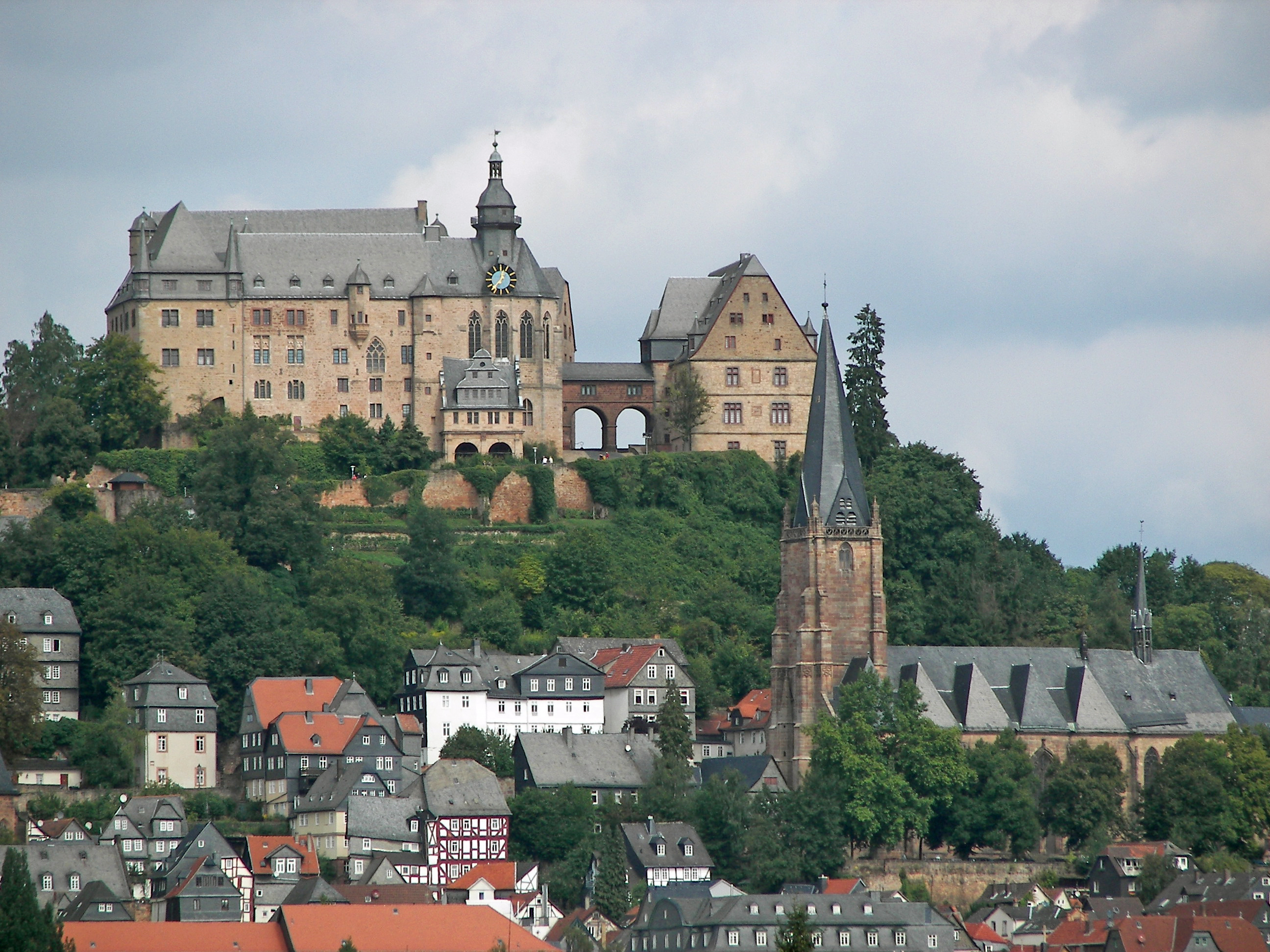
Landgrafenschloss Marburg

- Burg Amöneburg, Amöneburg
- Schloss Biedenkopf, Biedenkopf
- Burg Blankenstein, Gladenbach
- Burg Breidenbach, Breidenbach
- Schloss Breidenstein, Biedenkopf
- Burg Buchenau, Dautphetal
- Burg Bürgeln, Cölbe
- Burg (Caldern), Lahntal
- Christenberg, Münchhausen
- Burg Neu-Dernbach, Gladenbach
- Burg Ebsdorf, Ebsdorfergrund
- Burg Elnhausen, Marburg
- Eselsburg, Lohra
- Burg Etzgerode, Neustadt
- Hof Fleckenbühl, Cölbe
- Burg Forst, Neustadt
- Burg Frauenberg, Ebsdorfergrund
- Schloss Fronhausen, Fronhausen
- Burg Goßfelden, Lahntal
- Burg Hohenfels, Dautphetal
- Burg Hollende, Wetter
- Hunburg (Betziesdorf), Kirchhain
- Hunburg (Burgholz), Kirchhain
- Burg Hundsbach, Rauschenberg
- Burg Hundsgeweide, Amöneburg
- Kassenburg, Marburg
- Jagdschloss Katzenbach, Biedenkopf
- Burg Kirchhain, Kirchhain
- Burg Leiterstädt, Kirchhain
- Lüneburg (Mellnau), Wetter
- Landgrafenschloss Marburg, Marburg
- Burg Mellnau, Wetter
- Burg Momberg, Neustadt
- Burg Münchhausen (Stadtallendorf), Stadtallendorf
- Burg Naumburg, Gladenbach
- Nellenburg (Neustadt), Neustadt
- Hof Netz, Kirchhain
- Schloss Neustadt, Neustadt
- Burg Niederasphe, Münchhausen
- Burg Niederklein, Stadtallendorf
- Burg Offenhausen, Lohra
- Burg Radenhausen, Amöneburg
- Schloss Rauischholzhausen, Ebsdorfergrund
- Burg Rauschenberg, Rauschenberg
- Burg Rickelskopf, Weimar
- Burgwüstung Röderburg, Ebsdorfergrund
- Schloss Schönstadt, Cölbe
- Burg Schweinsberg (Hessen), Stadtallendorf
- Burg Stedebach, Weimar
- Burg Trugelrode, Neustadt
- Burg Waffensand, Stadtallendorf
- Burg Weissenstein, Marburg
- Wenigenburg, Amöneburg

== Vogelsbergkreis ==
- Schloss Eisenbach, Lauterbach
- Burg Homberg, Homberg
- Burg Lehrbach, Kirtorf
- Burg Seeburg, Schlitz
- Burg Schmitthof, Kirtorf
- Burgruine Wartenberg, Wartenberg
- Schloss Romrod, Romrod

== Kassel ==
- Chattenburg, Kassel
- Schloss Bellevue (Kassel)
- Löwenburg, Kassel
- Residenzpalais (Kassel)
- Schloss Wilhelmshöhe, Kassel

== Landkreis Fulda ==
- Stadtschloss Fulda, Fulda
- Schloss Fasanerie, Eichenzell
- Eichenzeller (Renaissance) Schlösschen, Eichenzell
- Schloss Buchenau, Eiterfeld
- Buchenau Castle, Eiterfeld
- Fürsteneck Castle, Eiterfeld
- Bieberstein Palace, Hesse, Hofbieber
- Gelbes Schloss, Tann
- Barockschloss, Gersfeld
- Schlossanlage mit Herrenhaus, Burghaun
- Haselstein Castle, Nüsttal
- Wartenberg Castle, Bad Salzschlirf
- Auersberg Castle, Hilders
- Ebersburg Castle, Ebersburg
- Eberstein Castle (Hilders), Hilders
- Milseburg Castle, Rhön
- Rabenstein Castle, Rhön
- Wüstung Moordorf, Rhön
- Schwedenschanze, Rhön

== Landkreis Hersfeld-Rotenburg ==
- Burgruine Altwehrda, Wehrda
- Schloss Blumenstein und Burg Wildeck, Wildeck
- Burgruine Dreienburg, above Friedewald-Lautenhausen
- Schloss Eichhof, Bad Hersfeld
- Wasserburg Friedewald, Friedewald
- Burg Hauneck, Haunetal
- Burg Herzberg, Breitenbach a. Herzberg
- Schloss Hohenwehrda, Wehrda
- Burgruine Landeck, Schenklengsfeld
- Schloss Ludwigseck, Ludwigsau
- Burgruine Milnrode, above Bad Hersfeld-Asbach
- Burg Neuenstein, Neuenstein
- Schloss Philippsthal, Philippsthal
- Schloss Rotenburg, Rotenburg a.d. Fulda
- Sinzigburg, Haunetal-Rhina
- Burg Tannenberg, Nentershausen

== Landkreis Kassel ==
- Burgruine Falkenberg, Zierenberg
- Burgruine Falkenstein, between Bad Emstal and Niedenstein
- Burg Grebenstein, Grebenstein
- Burgruine Igelsburg, Habichtswald
- Krukenburg, Bad Karlshafen
- Burgruine Landsberg, Wolfhagen
- Burgruine Malsburg, Zierenberg
- Schloss Riede, Bad Emstal
- Burgruine Rodersen, Wolfhagen
- Sababurg, Hofgeismar
- Burgruine Schartenberg, Zierenberg
- Burgruine Schauenburg, Schauenburg
- Burg Trendelburg, Trendelburg
- Weidelsburg, Wolfhagen
- Schloss Wilhelmsthal, Calden
- Wasserschloss Wülmersen, Trendelburg

== Schwalm-Eder-Kreis ==
- Altenburg, Felsberg-Altenburg
- Altenburg, Niedenstein
- Burg Falkenberg, Wabern
- Felsburg, Felsberg
- Schloss Garvensburg, Fritzlar-Züschen
- Kalbsburg, Großenenglis
- Schloss Hausen, Oberaula-Hausen
- Schloss Haydau, Morschen-Altmorschen
- Burg Heiligenberg, Felsberg
- Hohenburg, Homberg (Efze)
- Burg Jesberg, Jesberg
- Burg Löwenstein, Bad Zwesten-Schiffelborn
- Burg Niederurff, Bad Zwesten-Niederurff
- Obernburg, Gudensberg
- Jagdschloss Oberurff, Bad Zwesten-Oberurff
- Burg Schönstein, Gilserberg
- Schloss Spangenberg, Spangenberg
- Burgruine Wallenstein, Knüllwald
- Schloss Wabern, Wabern
- Wenigenburg, Gudensberg
- Schloss Ziegenhain, Schwalmstadt-Ziegenhain

== Landkreis Waldeck-Frankenberg ==
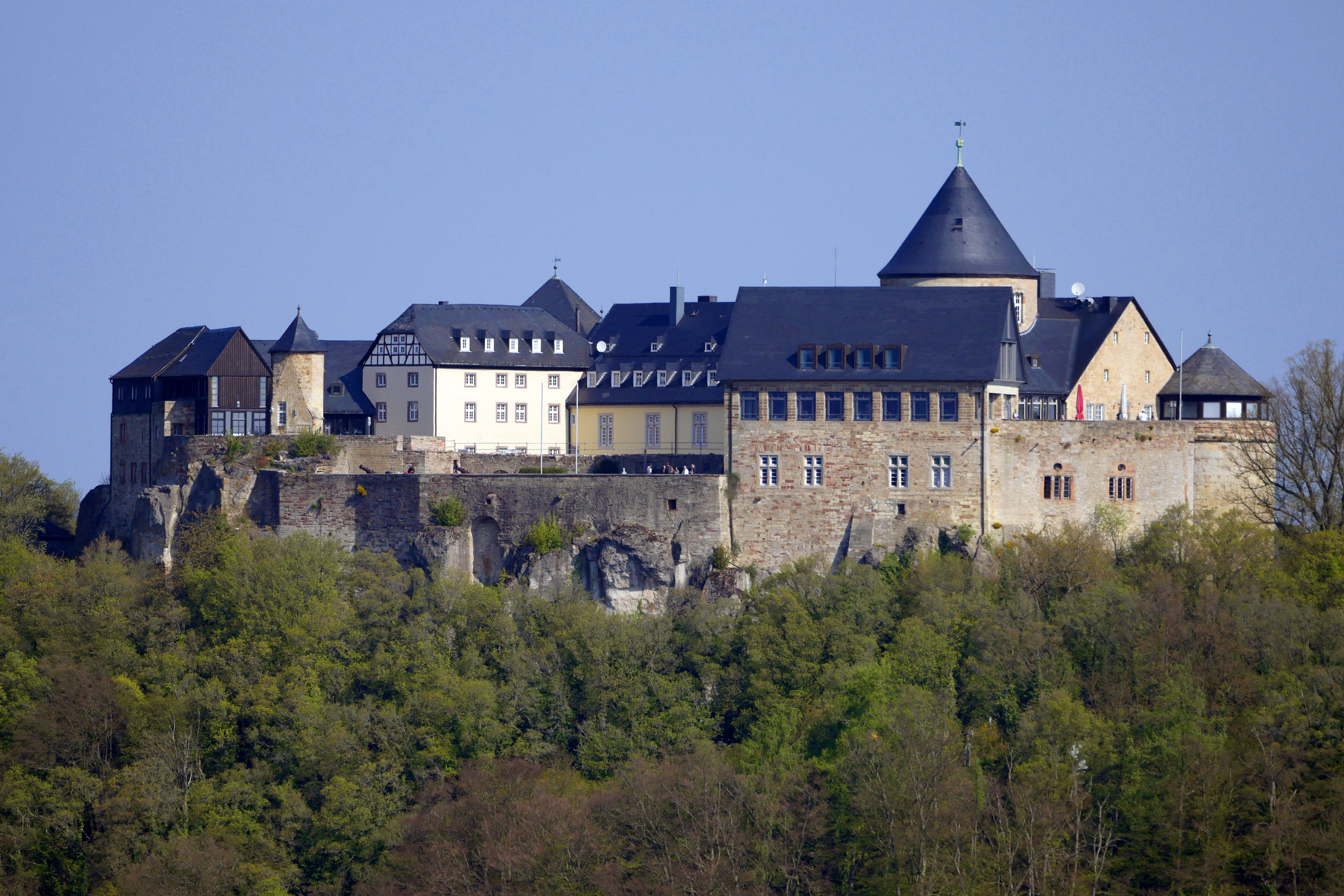
Schloss Waldeck

- Schloss Arolsen, Bad Arolsen
- Burg Aue, Wanfried
- Burg am Backofen, Vöhl-Schmittlotheim
- Burgruine Bringhausen, Edertal-Bringhausen
- Burgruine Eisenberg, Korbach
- Schloss Friedrichstein, Bad Wildungen
- Burg Hessenstein, Vöhl
- Itterburg, Vöhl
- Kellerburg, Battenberg
- Keseburg, Vöhl
- Kugelsburg, Volkmarsen
- Burg Lichtenfels, Lichtenfels
- Schloss Reckenberg, Lichtenfels
- Schloss Waldeck, Waldeck

== Werra-Meißner-Kreis ==
- Aue Castle, Wanfried
- Schloss Berlepsch, Witzenhausen
- Bilstein Castle, Eschwege
- Boyneburg, Sontra
- Brandenfels Castle, Herleshausen
- Landgrafenschloss Eschwege, Eschwege
- Fürstenstein Castle, Eschwege
- Gelsterburg, Großalmerode
- Ludwigstein Castle, Witzenhausen
- Schloss Rothestein, Bad Sooden-Allendorf
- Schwebda Castle, Meinhard
- Schloss Willershausen, Herleshausen
- Schloss Wolfsbrunnen, Eschwege
- Ziegenberg Castle, Witzenhausen

== See also ==
- List of castles
- List of castles in Germany
