= Lindheim =

Lindheim is a surname. Notable people with the surname include:

- Hermann Dietrich Lindheim (1790–1860), German merchant
- Irma Lindheim (1886–1978), Zionist fundraiser and educator
- Mary Tuthill Lindheim (1912–2004), American sculptor and studio potter
- Nicholas Lindheim (born 1984), American golfer

== See also ==
- Lindheim Castle
