= Haselstein Castle =

- Burg Haselstein
- Nüsttal-Haselstein
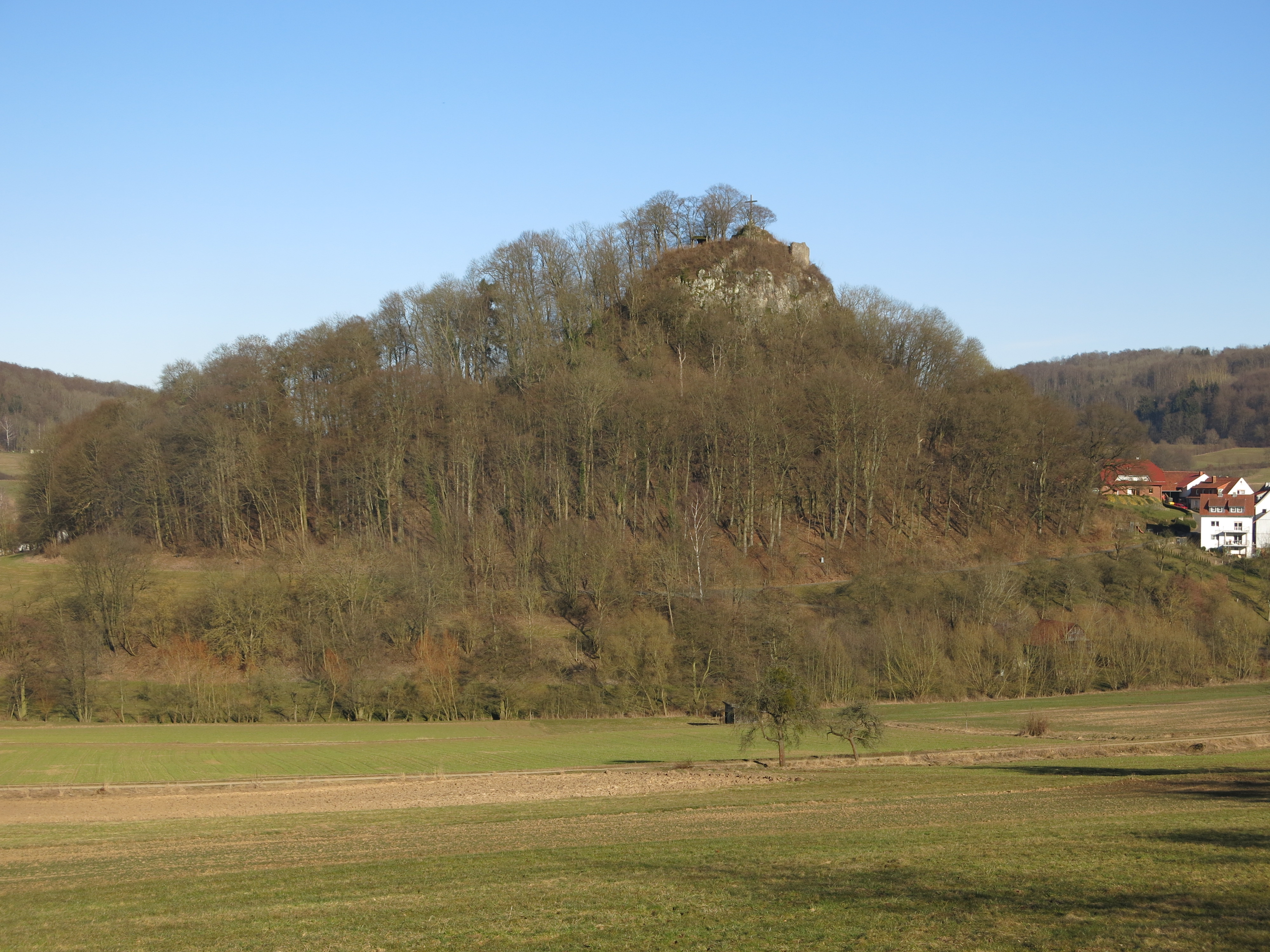
- View from the southwest

Site information
- Type: hill castle
- Code: DE-HE
- Condition: wall remains

Location
- Coordinates: 50°40′50.87″N 9°51′1.40″E
- Height: 434 m above sea level (NHN)

Site history
- Built: c. 1100

Garrison information
- Occupants: nobility

Haselstein Castle (Burg Haselstein) is a ruined hill castle near the village of Haselstein in Nüsttal in the county of Fulda in Hesse, Germany. It lies next to the village on a steep basalt cone at a height of 434 m above sea level (NN). The rock was first mentioned in 780/781 as the Haselahastein.

== History ==
The hilltop castle, probably built in the 11th century (or even earlier) by the lords of Haselstein, was first mentioned in 1119, when it was conquered by the Abbot of Fulda, Erlof of Bergholz, in order to put an end to the robber baronetcy that had been based there. The first known lord of the castle was Wigger of Hasela, recorded in 1135. From 1156, after being taken again, the castle was ended up in the possession of Fulda Abbey and became the seat of their officials, including the lords of Haselstein (until their extinction in 1330) and the lords von der Tann, who administered the office of Haselstein from there. The later Electoral Saxon court counsellor and envoy, Eberhard von der Tann, who introduced the Reformation there in 1534 as regent of the Lordship of Tann, was born in 1495 at Haselstein Castle.

The castle was last mentioned in 1512, when Dietrich of Ebersberg was an officer there. At the foot of the castle hill a new district house was built in 1546, and the castle, which was no longer used, fell into disrepair or served as a quarry. Of the former castle complex, only small remains of the surrounding wall and two sides of the former gate tower remain. The round bergfried, which has now completely disappeared, once had a diameter of about six metres.

== Literature ==
- Rudolf Knappe: Mittelalterliche Burgen in Hessen. 800 Burgen, Burgruinen und Burgstätten. 3. Auflage. Wartberg-Verlag. Gudensberg-Gleichen 2000, ISBN 3-86134-228-6, S. 193f.
- Rolf Müller (ed.): Schlösser, Burgen, alte Mauern. Herausgegeben vom Hessendienst der Staatskanzlei, Wiesbaden 1990, ISBN 3-89214-017-0, S. 280f.
- Andreas Knüttel: Die Raubritter von Burg Haselstein - Dichtung und Wahrheit, Buchenblätter (Beilage der Fuldaer Zeitung), 2016/1 Online (retrieved 20 January 2016)
- Andreas Knüttel: Die Burg Haselstein - So hat sie ausgesehen, Buchenblätter (Beilage der Fuldaer Zeitung), 2016/1 Online (retrieved 11 July 2016)
