= Josef Budenz =

German linguist

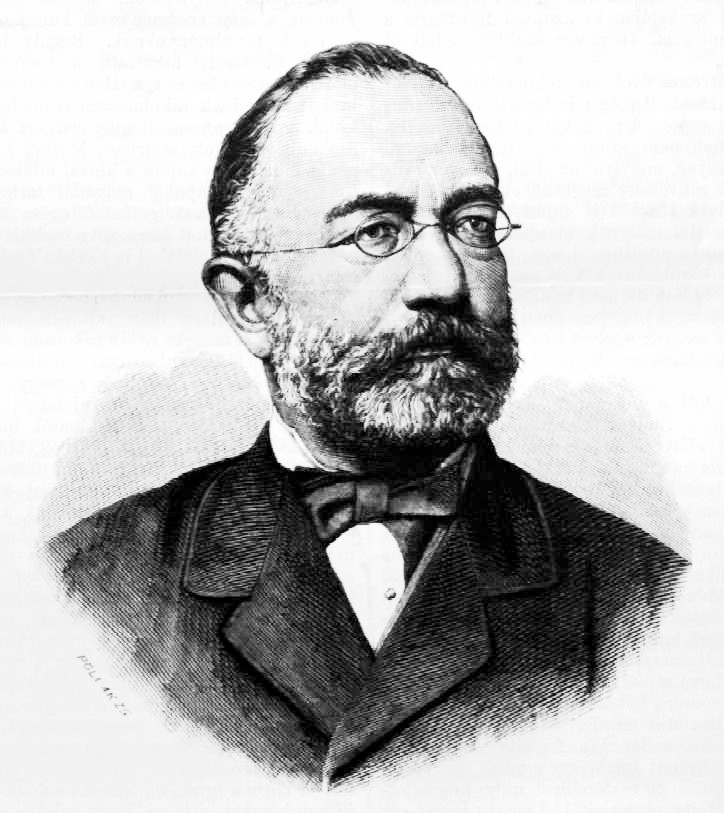
- German-born linguist of Hungarian
- Born: June 13, 1836; Rasdorf, Grand Duchy of Hesse
- Died: April 15, 1892 (aged 55); Budapest, Austria-Hungary
- Occupation: linguist
- Known for: origins of Hungarian

Josef Budenz (Hungarian: József Budenz) (13 June 1836 – 15 April 1892) was a German comparative linguist specializing in Finno-Ugric who researched the origins of the Hungarian language.

== Early life and education ==
Josef Budenz graduated from high school in Fulda in 1854 and studied in Marburg and from 1855 for three years in Göttingen, among others with Theodor Benfey with a focus on Indo-European comparative linguistics. He received his doctorate in 1858.

== Career ==
In 1858 he was in Budapest and taught in Székesfehérvár. In 1861 he was appointed librarian of the Hungarian Academy of Sciences. He deepened his knowledge of Uralic and Altaic languages under the guidance of Pál Hunfalvy. From 1868 (Note: According to another source, he was full professor from 1872) he was a full professor of Altaic comparative linguistics, the chair having been established especially for him. In 1871 he became a full member of the Hungarian Academy of Sciences. On 17 March 1884, he was honored in the university auditorium. From 1876 he was a corresponding member of the Russian Academy of Sciences in St. Petersburg.

=== Origins of Hungarian ===
Today, the consensus among linguists is that Hungarian is a member of the Uralic family of languages.

The classification of Hungarian as a Uralic/Finno-Ugric rather than a Turkic language was a matter of impassioned political controversy throughout the 18th and into the 19th centuries. During the latter half of the 19th century, a competing hypothesis proposed a Turkic affinity of Hungarian, or, alternatively, that both the Uralic and the Turkic families formed part of a superfamily of Ural–Altaic languages.

The debate came to a head in the 1880s between the two camps, known as the Ugric-Turkic war. One camp proposed that Hungarians were related to Turanians, supported by Arminius Vambery who wrote a book on the topic and was a friend of Budenz. Budenz attacked Vambery's book in a lecture at the Hungarian Academy, and challenged his methods as unscientific. Vambery struck back with his own accusations against his friend. After things settled, the Finno-Ugric hypothesis was concluded the sounder of the two, mainly based on work by Budenz.

== Death ==
Budenz died in Budapest on 15 April 1892, and was buried on 17 April 1892.

== Memorials and retrospectives ==
On 27 May 1963, a memorial plaque was dedicated in his honor at the house where he was born, currently in use as the town hall of the village where he formerly attended school in Rasdorf. The commemorative plaque bears the inscription: "Here stood until 1954 the house in which on 13 June 1836 Joseph Budenz was born. He was a professor at the University of Budapest from 1868 until his death on 15 April 1892, and is the founder of modern Finno-Ugric comparative linguistics. Donated by the Societas Uralo-Altaica on May 23, 1963."

The Fuldaer Geschichtsblätter also published an article about him in 1936 on the centenary of his birth.

The Budenz Gymnasium in Budapest published a Budenz memorial book in Hungarian in 2002. A "Budenz Day" is held every year at the Finno-Ugrian Seminar of the University of Göttingen.

== Works ==
- Budenz, József (1869). Ugrische Sprachstudien (in German). Vol. I–II. Pest: L. Aigner. OCLC 492188431.
- Übersicht der Verzweigung der ugrischen Sprachen, 1878
- Budenz, József (1966). A comparative dictionary of the Finno-Ugric elements in the Hungarian vocabulary. Uralic and Altaic series, v. 78. Bloomington: Indiana University. OCLC 15269354. (Reproduction of the original published in Budapest 1873-1881, with an introduction by Gyula Décsy)

== See also ==
- Comb Ceramic culture
- Estonian language
- Finnic languages
- Finnish language
- Finno-Permic languages
- Indo-Uralic languages
- Old Hungarian script
- Proto-Finnic language
- Proto-Uralic homeland hypotheses
- Proto-Uralic language
- Samoyedic languages
- Turanism
- Ural-Altaic languages
- Uralic languages
- Uralo-Siberian languages
- Volga Finns
