= Ebersburg Castle =

Ruined hill castle in Ebersberg, East Hesse, Germany

- Ebersburg-Ebersberg
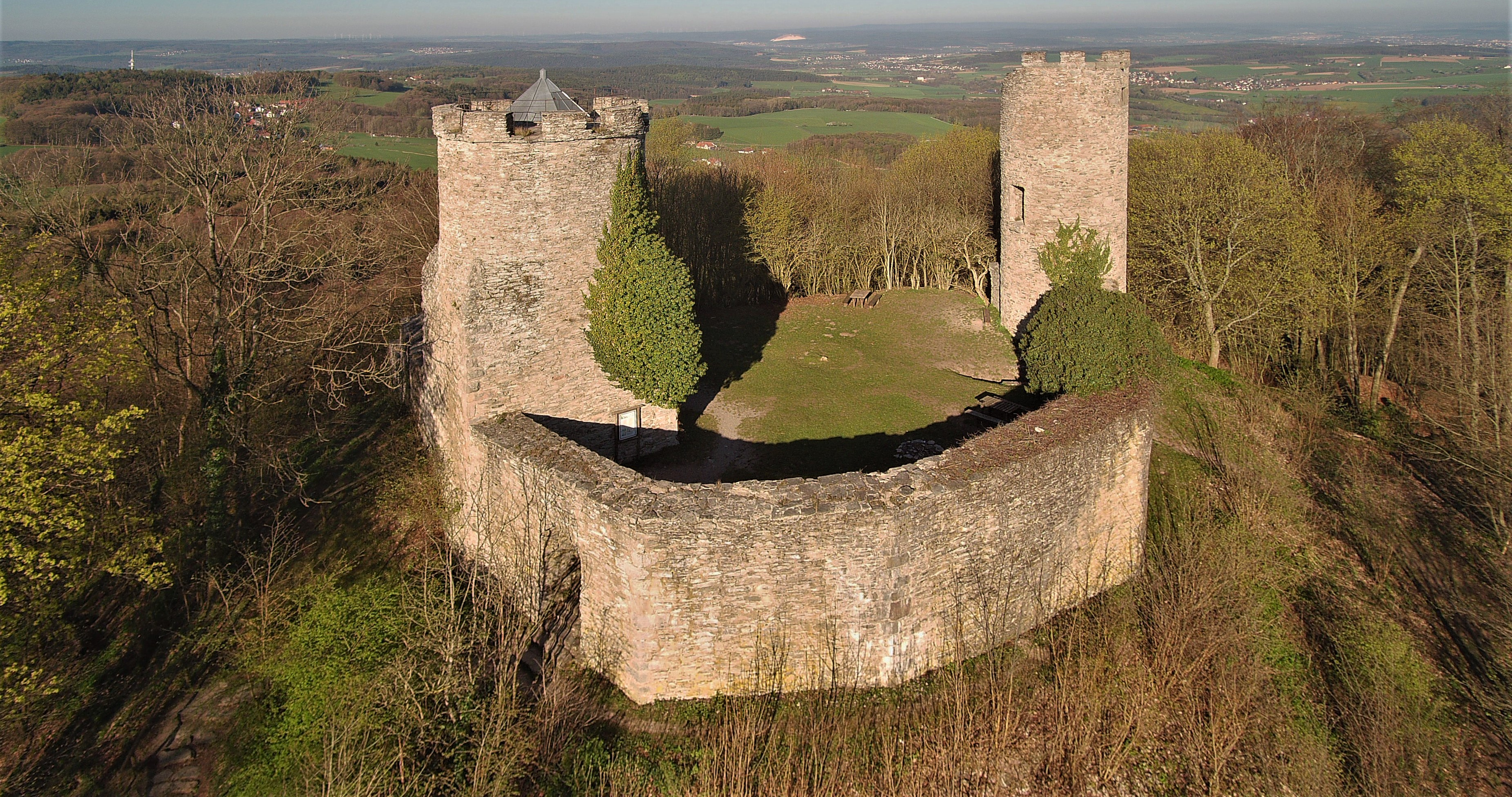
- The main castle with the South Tower in the foreground

Site information
- Type: hill castle
- Code: DE-HE
- Condition: bergfried, enceinte

Location
- Coordinates: 50°28′27.84″N 9°51′5.76″E
- Height: 689 m above sea level (NHN)

Site history
- Built: c. 1100, reconstruction in 1396

Garrison information
- Occupants: nobility

Ebersburg Castle (Burg Ebersburg) is a ruined hill castle in Ebersberg in the parish of Ebersburg in the county of Fulda in East Hesse, Germany. It is the symbol of Ebersberg as well as the origin of its name.

A castle built around 1100 was the basis of the subsequent structure. Around 1396, the castle was extended and expanded. As it never had its own castle well, it was not very suitable as a permanent residence and was finally abandoned in the 16th century. After the Thirty Years' War there was an attempt to occupy it again by building a half-timbered house but even that failed after a few years. In the 19th century, the ruin was on the territory of the old Weyhers District Court, which was part of the Kingdom of Bavaria. During that period one of its towers was converted into a lookout tower and the castle was restored for preservation reasons. Today it is owned by the State of Hesse. It is a protected cultural monument.

The castle is accessible to visitors at any time. The key for the observation tower can be collected nearby. The authorities of the Hessian Rhön Nature Park have signposted the footpaths in the vicinity of the castle.

== Literature ==
- Heiner Flick, Adalbert Schraft: Die Hessische Röhn – Geotope im Land der offenen Fernen. Hessisches Landesamt für Umwelt und Geologie, Wiesbaden 2013, ISBN 978-3-89026-373-1, pp 195–197.
- Fritz Luckhard: Die Regesten der Herren von Ebersberg genannt von Weyhers in der Rhön (1170–1518) (= Veröffentlichung des Fuldaer Geschichtsvereins, Vol. 40). Parzeller, Fulda 1963, ZDB-ID 517272-x.
- Wolf-Dieter Raftopoulo: Rhön und Grabfeld Kulturführer. Eine kunst- und kulturhistorische Gesamtdokumentation der alten Kulturlandschaften. RMd Verlag, Gerbrunn 2017, ISBN 978-3-9818603-7-5, S. 87–88.
- Benjamin Rudolph, Annina Hilfenhaus: Die Kontinuität des Unsteten – Die Ruine Ebersburg (Rhön) zwischen Ruinierung und Wiederherstellung. In: Fuldaer Geschichtsverein (publ.): Fuldaer Geschichtsblätter. Jahrgang 82. Rindt-Druck, Fulda 2006, ISSN 0016-2612, pp 5–54.
