= Falkenstein Castle (Bad Emstal) =

Coordinates: 51°15′14″N 9°17′45″E

Falkenstein Castle (Burgruine Falkenstein)
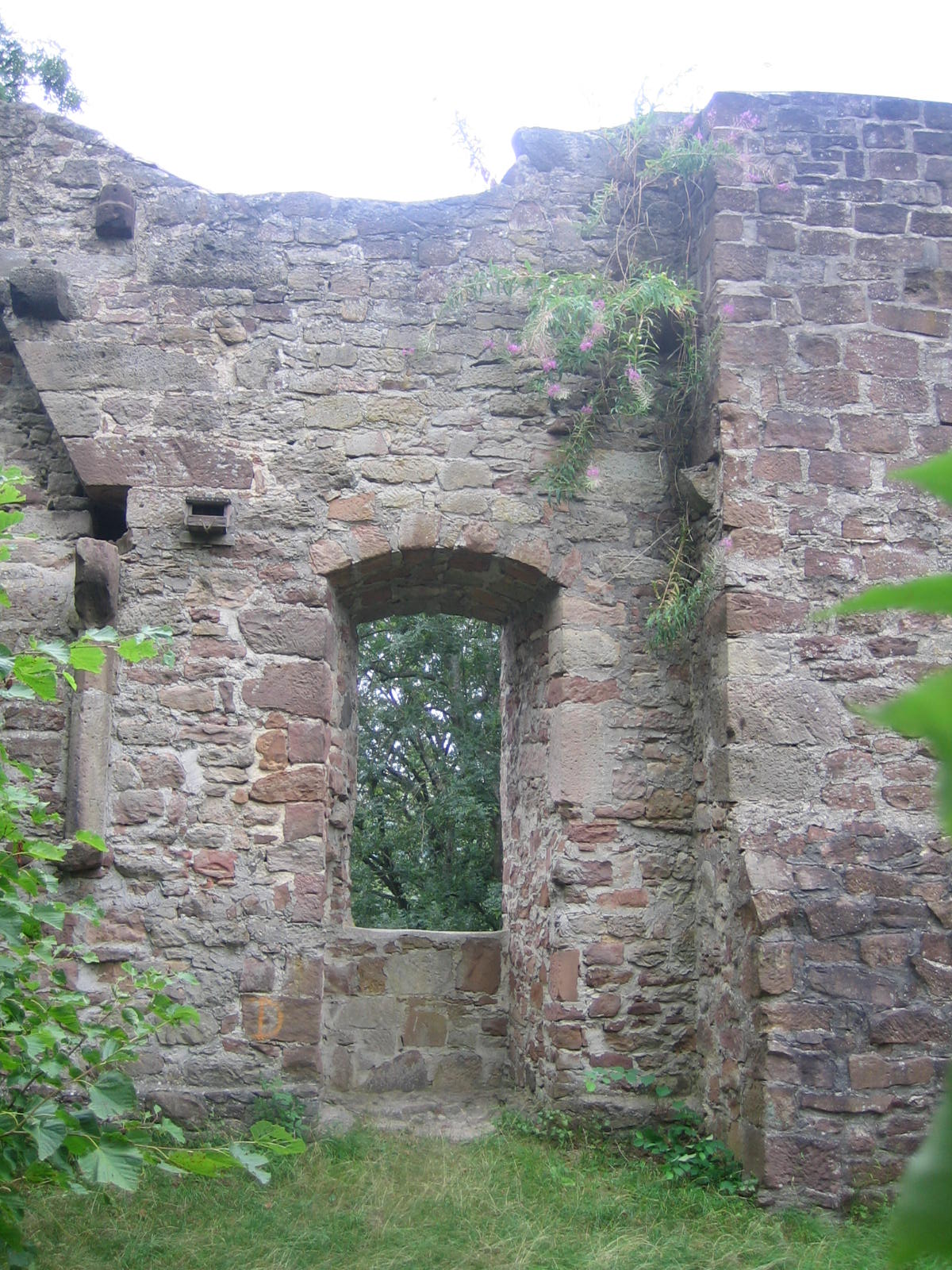
- The ruins of Falkenstein Castle

Geography
- Location: Hesse, Germany

Falkenstein Castle (German: Burgruine Falkenstein) near Bad Emstal is a castle in Hesse, Germany.
