= Hofaschenbach =

Coordinates: 50°38′N 9°51′E

Hofaschenbach is a small village in Fulda district in the German state of Hesse. It is the seat of Nüsttal municipality.
