= Mary Tuthill Lindheim =

American sculptor (1912–2004)

- Born: Mary Barbara Tuthill; February 14, 1912; Newton, New Jersey
- Died: December 30, 2004 (aged 92); Bolinas, California
- Education: California School of Fine Arts, Chouinard Art Institute, California College of Arts and Crafts
- Known for: Sculpture, Ceramics
- Notable work: Towards Unity, 1959/1993, acrylic painting and stones; Abstract vessel, 1958, clay; Stoneware bowl with carnelians inset in glaze, n.d.; The Mothers (a.k.a. Atomic Testing), c. 1968, burned clay; Moses, 1934, terracotta, painted
- Movement: Modernist, Bay Area Potters Association

Mary Tuthill Lindheim (February 14, 1912 – December 30, 2004), born Mary Barbara Tuthill, and also known professionally as Mary Tuthill or Mary Lindheim, was an American sculptor and studio potter.

She trained as a sculptor with Ralph Stackpole and Alexander Archipenko, working in Los Angeles, Chicago, New York, and San Francisco between 1930 and 1945. Widowed in World War II, she turned to ceramics, studying with Antonio Prieto at California College of Arts and Crafts (now California College of the Arts), and was an active studio artist and leader in potters' and craftsmen circles in the Bay Area from 1946 to 1969.

In 1969, she moved to Bolinas, California, and in 1994, she was given a retrospective at the small but respected Bolinas Museum, which revived her reputation.

== Early life ==
Born in Newton, New Jersey and raised in Tucson, Arizona, where her father was rector of Grace Episcopal Church, Mary Tuthill showed talent in art, writing, and acting. The desert's plant and animal life, landforms and colors strongly influenced her visual esthetic. Her first work of art, at age 11, was a miniature adobe house. She suffered several childhood diseases, including typhoid fever, and was only sporadically enrolled in school. She was instructed by tutors and had the run of her father's vast, eclectic library. Her esthetic was also influenced by her mother's design sense and cultural interests, particularly musical. At the age of 14, upset over a news photograph of a lynching, Mary Tuthill joined the NAACP, and from then on was an ardent political and social activist.

== Art education ==
She began studying sculpture with Ralph Stackpole at the California School of Fine Arts (now San Francisco Art Institute) in 1930. In 1934 she met Alexander Archipenko, who arranged for a scholarship for her at Chouinard Art Institute in Los Angeles. Her first major exhibition was a juried group show at Transigram Studios in Los Angeles, where she won an Award of Merit. She moved to New York in the late 1930s and in 1938 studied briefly with Isamu Noguchi and Jose de Creeft. She excelled in terracotta, stone carving and direct plaster.

Archipenko was her most influential teacher. She became good friends with him and his wife, sculptor Gela Forster (Angelica Archipenko, daughter of Bruno Schmitz), and he hired her to teach with him at summer session at the University of Washington in Seattle and at his summer school in Woodstock, New York. Noguchi was also an important influence, though her studies with him were brief.

== Middle career ==
In the summer of 1946, Lindheim entered the California College of Arts and Crafts in Oakland to study with ceramist Antonio Prieto. She was awarded a scholarship after a semester of study, and within a year she was exhibiting with some of the best studio potters in the United States. She became active in the movements to achieve respect for ceramics and other studio craft, elevate standards for potters and encourage them to think beyond utilitarian ware, and encourage the development of a pottery for America—building from many traditions but going forward with the country's unique pioneering energy. She was president of the Association of San Francisco Potters, founded in 1945 by F. Carlton Bell, and was active as an officer and exhibitor in San Francisco Women Artists. She was a co-founder of Designer-Craftsmen of California, and for many years participated as an installation designer, juror and/or planner of the Sausalito Art Fair.

As a potter, Lindheim excelled in stoneware and surface treatments, including carved and inlaid work, and her glazes, which she always mixed herself, included a heavily textured and exquisitely controlled crawl glaze she developed in the early 1950s. She always considered herself a sculptor first, and worked in diverse forms and in many different media. From 1946 to 1969 both her ceramics and her sculptural wall panels and mosaics employing magnesite, sand, metal, stones, and pebbles were widely exhibited and won many awards. She lived for most of those years in Forest Knolls and Sausalito.

== Later life ==
In 1969, she moved to Bolinas, a coastal community in west Marin County, and continued to pursue her art, but at a slower pace. There she worked on a family biography, Dad and His Family. It was completed after her death and is unpublished.

She was married three times, to Jack Hereford (1928), William Robson (1933) and Donald Lindheim (1941). Tragically, Donald Lindheim died in the last few days of the war in 1945. She turned to ceramics to continue her art and make a living, and kept his name as her professional name.

In 1994, Lindheim came out of semi-retirement when she was given a retrospective at the Bolinas Museum. For the first time the public saw the breadth of her creative work – wall panels, mosaics, ceramics, sculpture, and jewelry – in the same place. She had retained most of her best work, living frugally so she would not have to sell more than absolutely necessary. Some of the work in the retrospective now resides in the permanent collections of the Oakland Museum of California and the Bolinas Museum. The remainder is in other museums, private collections, and the estate of the artist.

== Gallery ==
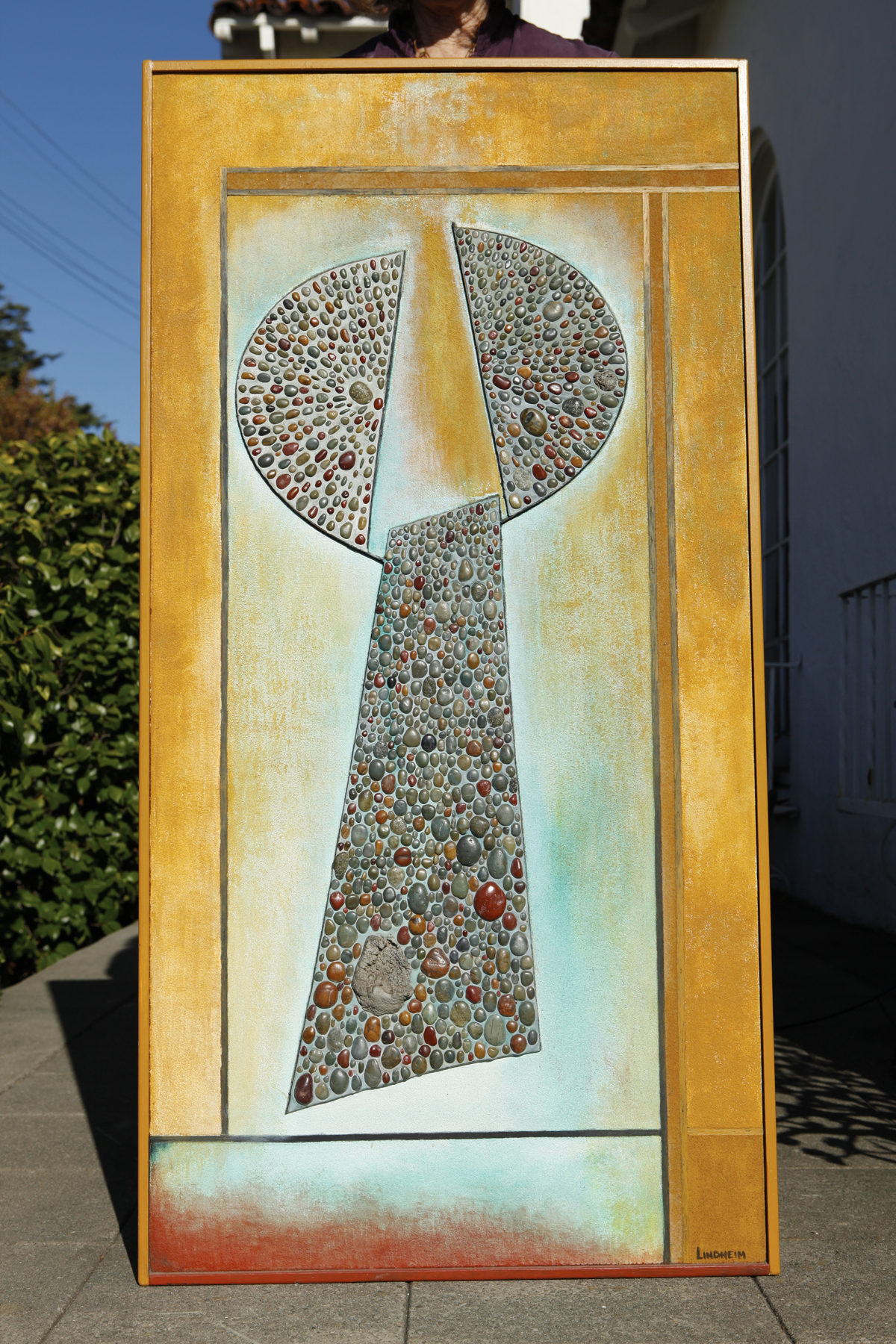
Towards Unity, 1959/1993. Acrylic painting and stones. 49 x 29 in. Photo by Will Taylor.

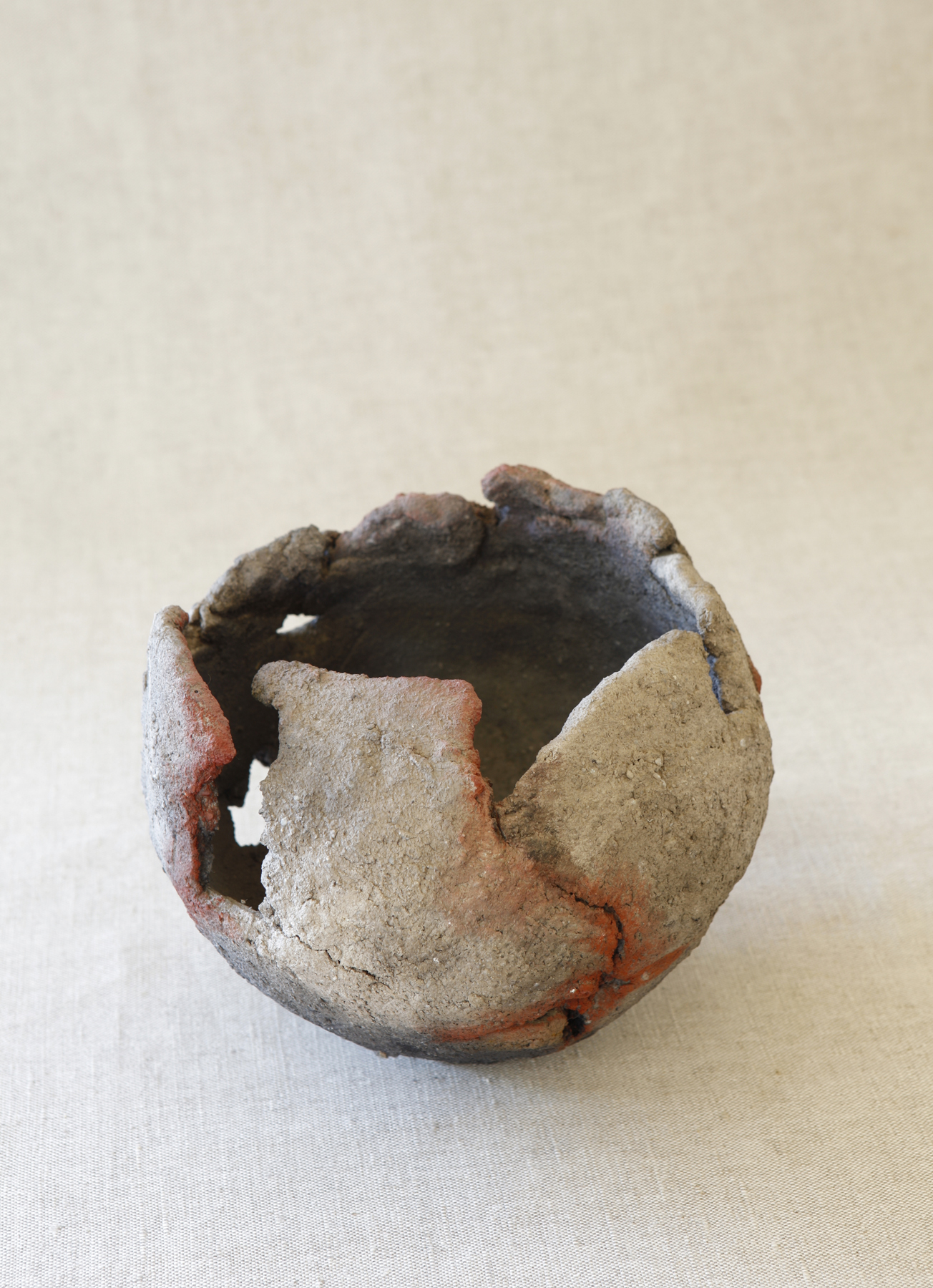
Untitled abstract vessel, 1958. Clay, pit-fired, 6 × 8 in. Photo by Will Taylor.

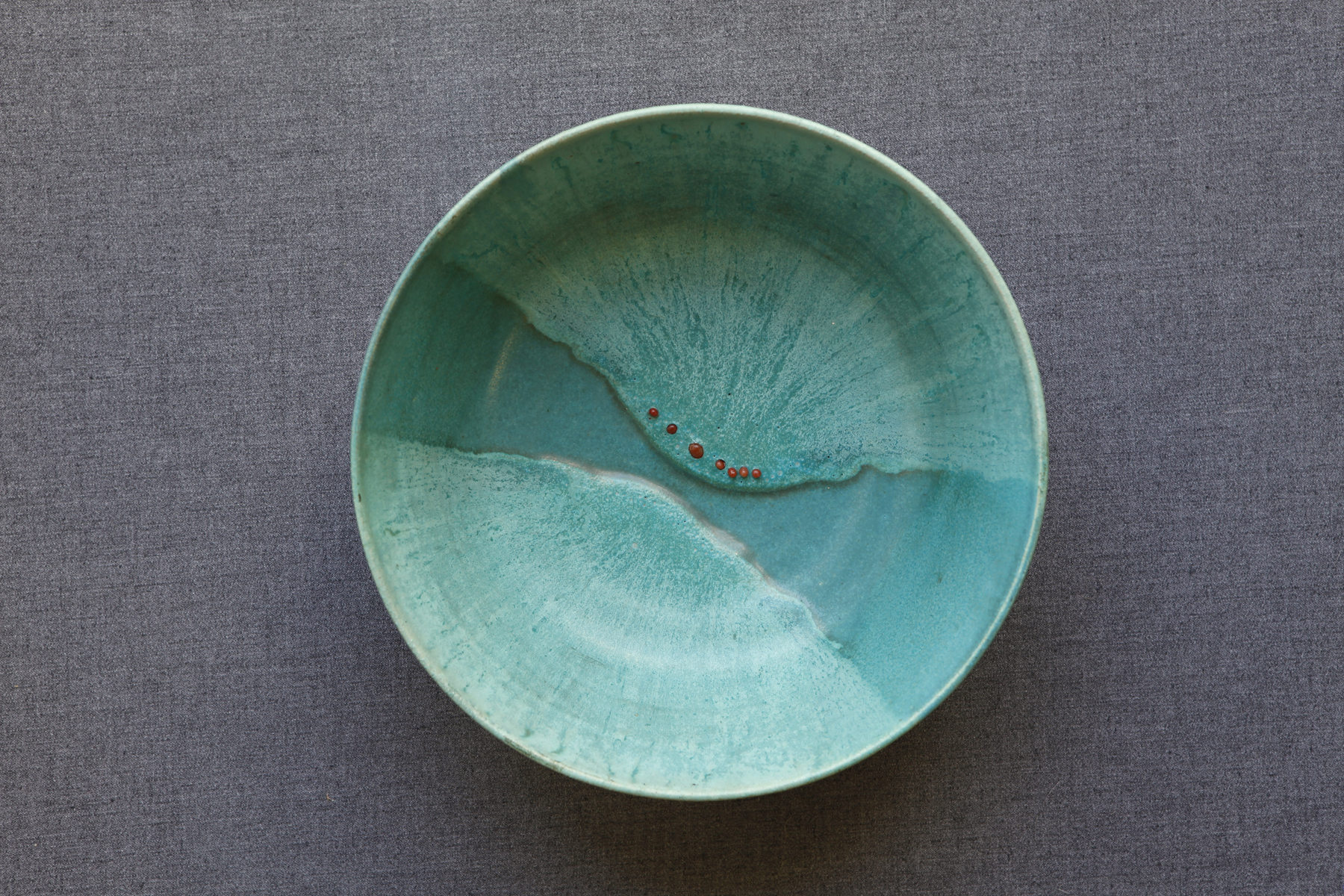
Stoneware bowl with carnelians inset in glaze, 1950s. 12 in. Photo by Will Taylor.

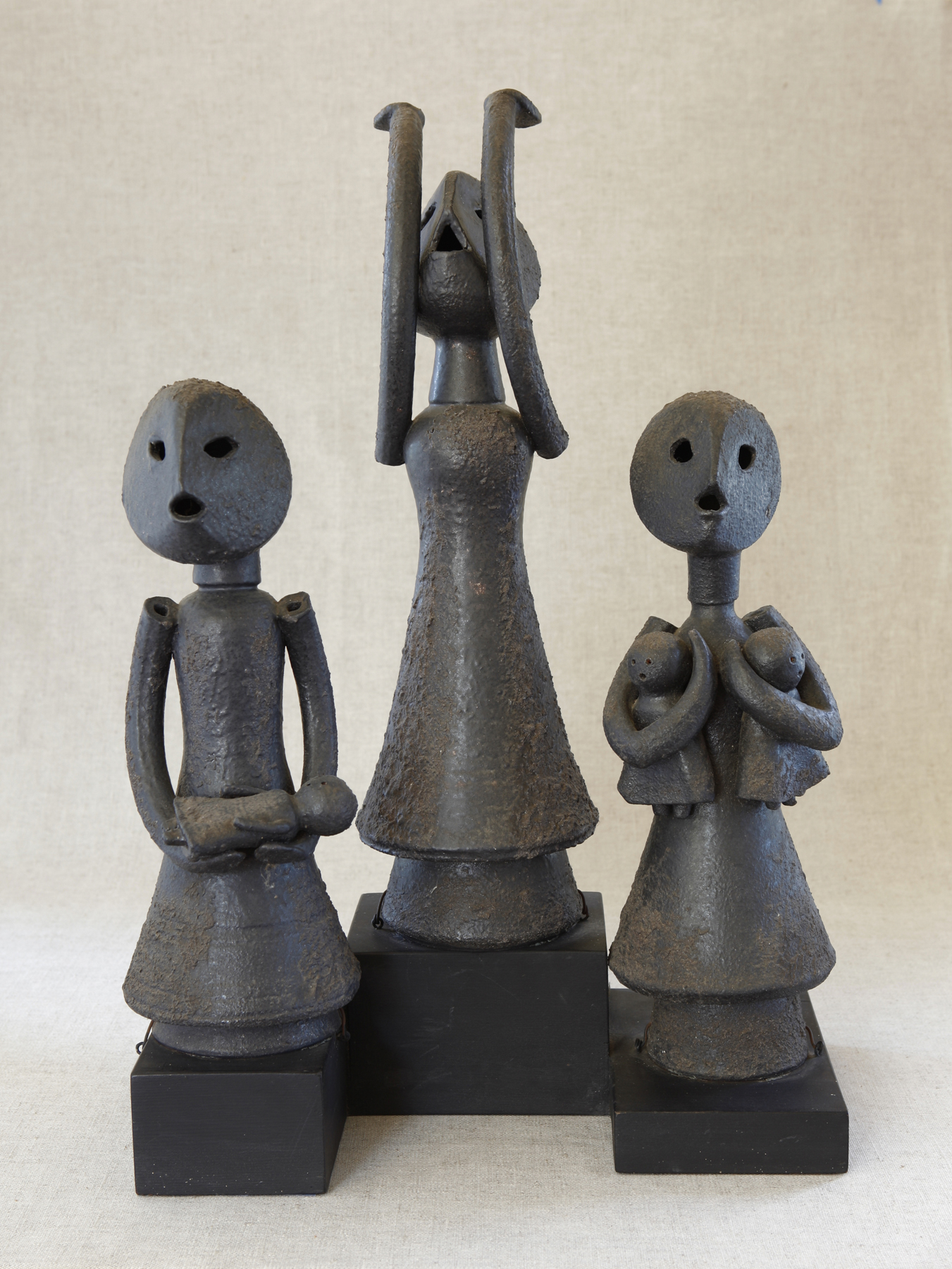
The Mothers (a.k.a. Atomic Testing), c. 1968. Burned clay. 22 x 15 × 9 in. Photo by Will Taylor. Collection of Arizona State University Art Museum.

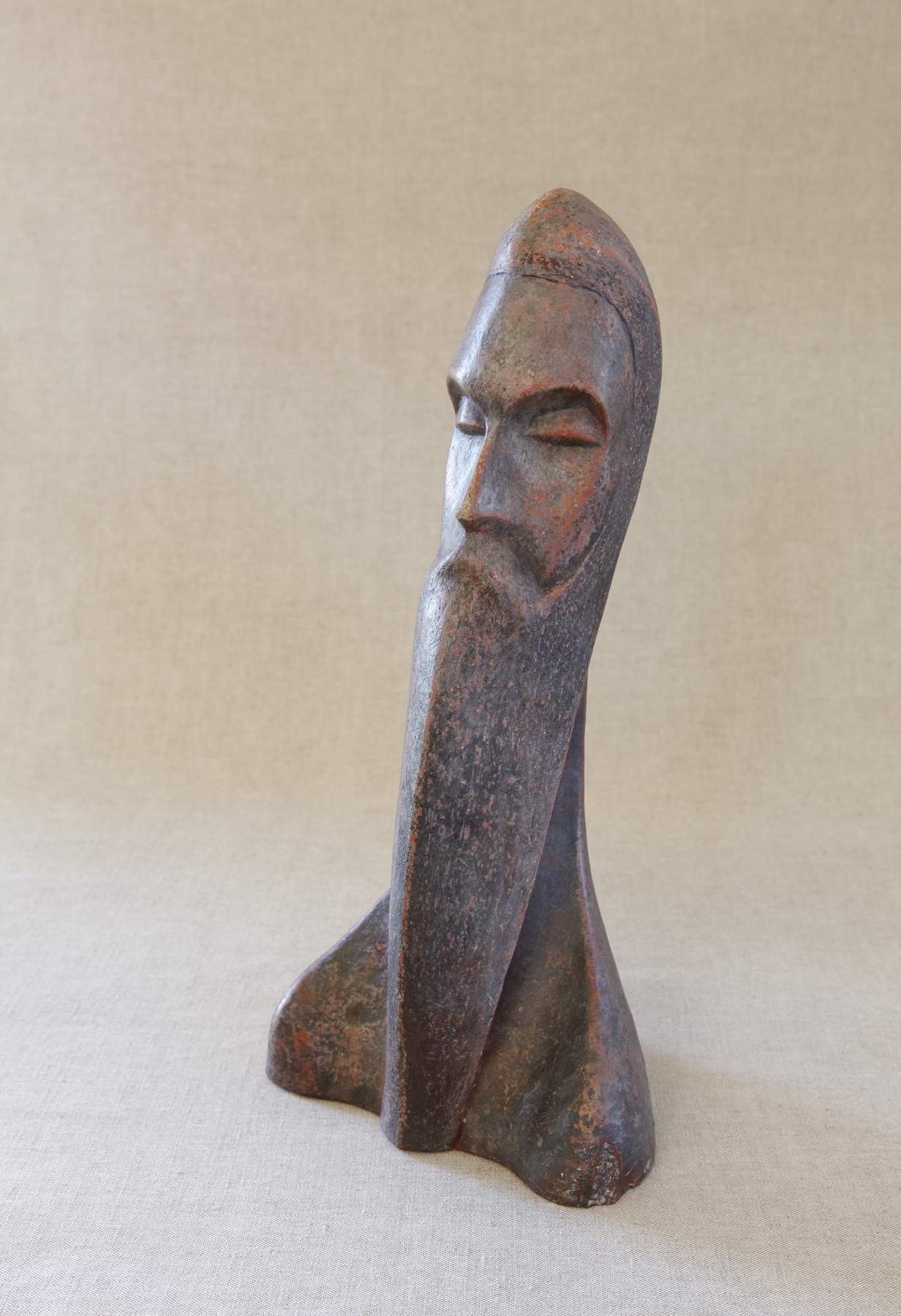
Moses, 1934. Terracotta, painted. 18.5 × 8 x 5 in. Photo by Will Taylor. Collection of Jay Lagemann.

== Unpublished manuscripts ==
- Lindheim, Mary, editor, A Soldier's Letters, 1995.
- Lindheim, Mary, Dad and His Family, 2006.

== Bibliography ==
Books:

- Hoffman, George, Saucelito-$au$alito: Legends and Tales of a Changing Town, Woodward 1976, p. 164–168.
- Kenny, John B., Ceramic Design, Chilton 1963, p. 149.
- Sellers, Thomas, Throwing on the Potter’s Wheel, Professional Publications, Inc., 1960, p. 21.
- Swenson, Elizabeth; Glaser, Jeanne; Mau, Linda; Presley, Jan; Schacter, Jan; and Sherman, Rick, eds., Clay & Glass: Association of California Ceramic Artists, Association of California Ceramic Artists, 1993, p. vi, viii.
- Wasserman, Abby, Editor, Mary Tuthill Lindheim: Art and Inspiration, Cameron + Company 2010. Essays by Maria Porges, Abby Wasserman, and Aram Fischer. Introduction by Julie M. Muniz.

Periodicals (selected):

- "Students Carve Statues in Red Sandstone from Mansion," San Francisco Chronicle, April 18, 1931 [photos and quotes of Mary Tuthill attributed to "Mairdi Hereford," a name Lindheim used while married to Jack Hereford—see following reference].
- "Michael Angelo Was Wrong And Tucson Girl Proves It," The Arizona Daily Star, April 20, 1931 [photos and quotes attributed to "Mary Hereford (Mary Barbara Tuthill")].
- Townsend, Betsy, "Mystery Girl Hit of Oakland Art Show: Mary Tuthill No Novice to Art World," Oakland Herald Tribune, May 8, 1941.
- Frankenstein, Alfred, "An Annual Exhibit of Sculpture," San Francisco Chronicle, This World, May 18, 1941.
- "Rebirth of a Craft" (photo essay on Lindheim), Coronet Magazine, May 1949, p. TK.
- Scripps College Pacific Coast Invitational Ceramic Art exhibition, Los Angeles Times, March 30, 1951.
- "When Art Enters Ceramics" (feature on Lindheim), Seven Arts Magazine, June–July 1952.
- "Show Time: Ceramics Returns Out-of-Doors," Ceramics Monthly, September 1953, p. 31.
- "Patio Pavilion," Craft Horizons, November 1953, p. 25.
- Special California Issue, Craft Horizons, September–October 1956, p. 31.
- "Top Prize of Crafts Show to Lindheim," Sausalito News, April 1957.
- "Prize-Winning Ceramist," Independent Journal, June 1, 1957, p. M12.
- "Primitive Pottery At The Beach," Marin Independent Journal, June 7, 1958, pages M8-M9.
- Eustus, Amber, "Art Is Where You Find It—And It's All Around You," Marin Independent-Journal, June 30, 1958, p. 19.
- Fried, Alexander, "Reviewing the Exhibits: A Potpourri of SF Pottery," San Francisco Examiner, December 11, 1960.
- Glaser, Jeanne, "Historian's Report: Mary Lindheim, ACCA President 1952," Association of California Ceramic Artists Newsletter, 1988, p. 3.
- Jacobs, Marjorie K., "Mary Lindheim Retrospective," Point Reyes Light, July 7, 1994.
- Underwood, Tyson, "Fifty-year scope: Viewing art as dynamic process," Pacific Sun, August 10–16, 1994, p. 18.
- Bradley, Larken, "Prominent Bolinas artist dies at 92; celebrated life," Point Reyes Light, January 13, 2005.
