= Bad Emstal =

- Municipality
- Location of Bad Emstal within Kassel district
- Interactive map of Bad Emstal
- Location within Germany Location within Hesse
- Coordinates: 51°14′N 9°15′E
- Country: Germany
- State: Hesse
- Admin. region: Kassel
- District: Kassel

Government
  - Mayor (2024–30): Daniel Rudenko (CDU)

Area
  - Total: 38.67 km^{2} (14.93 sq mi)
- Elevation: 260 m (850 ft)

Population (2025-12-31)
  - Total: 5,517
  - Density: 142.7/km^{2} (369.5/sq mi)
- Time zone: UTC+01:00 (CET)
  - Summer (DST): UTC+02:00 (CEST)
- Postal codes: 34308
- Dialling codes: 05624
- Vehicle registration: KS
- Website: www.bad-emstal.de

Bad Emstal is a municipality in the district of Kassel, in Hesse, Germany. It is situated 19 km southwest of Kassel, Germany.

The municipality is the only one in Hesse that does not have a coat of arms.

== Demographics ==
Bad Emstal is 20 km in the south-west of the main district city Kassel. The commune is surrounded by the national park Habichtswald.

== Localities ==
- Falkenstein Castle (Bad Emstal)
