= Lindheim Castle =

Coordinates: 50°17′22″N 8°59′08″E

Lindheim Castle (German: Burg Lindheim) is a former medieval castle in Lindheim, in the municipality of Altenstadt, Wetteraukreis county, in the German state of Hesse. In the Middle Ages the castle became a large joint inheritance or Ganerbschaft of lesser noble families, who were an important local power in the eastern Wetterau. In 1697, stately home, Schloss Lindheim, was built. Only a few remnants of both buildings have survived today.

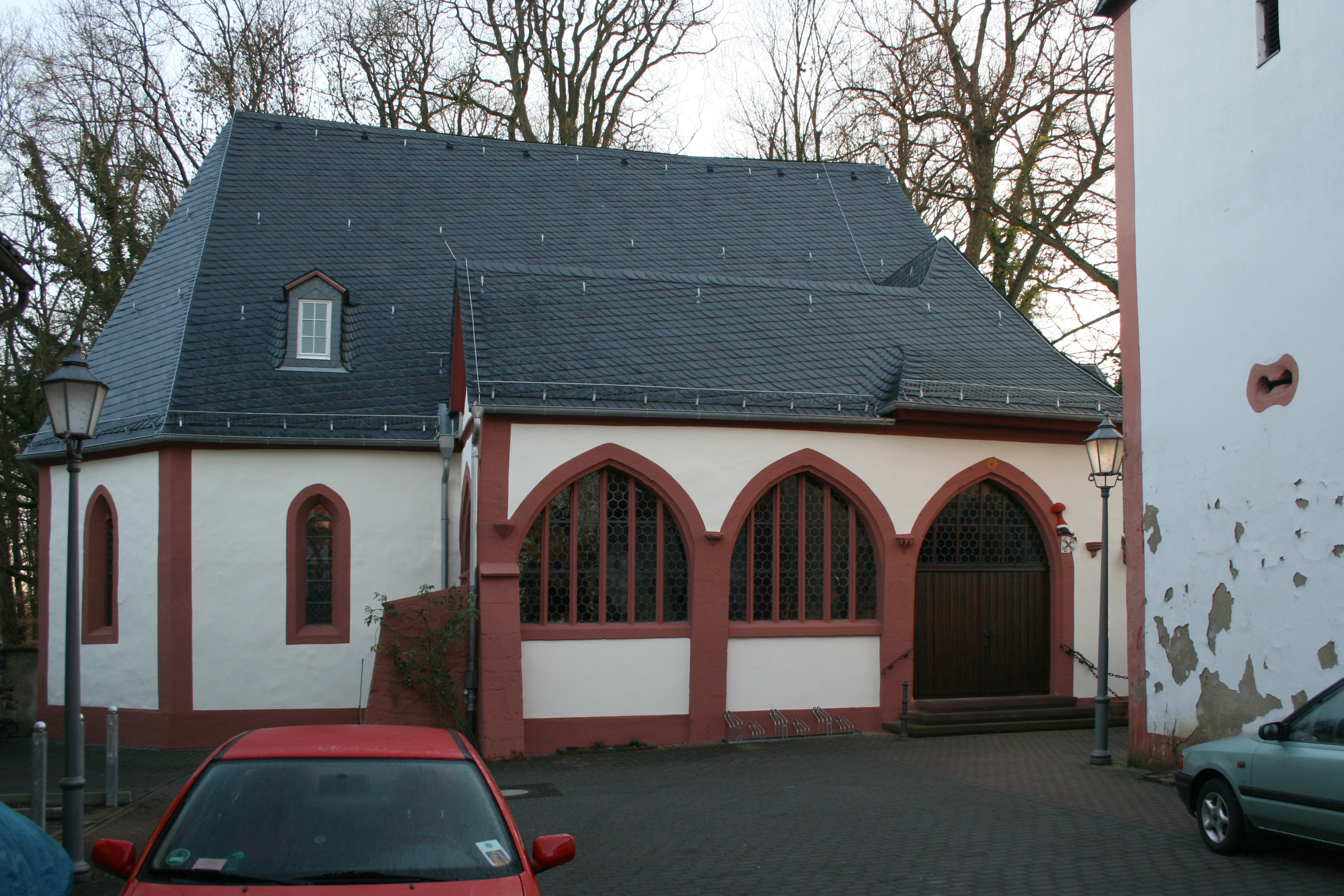
In the nave there is still part of an old great hall (Rittersaal).

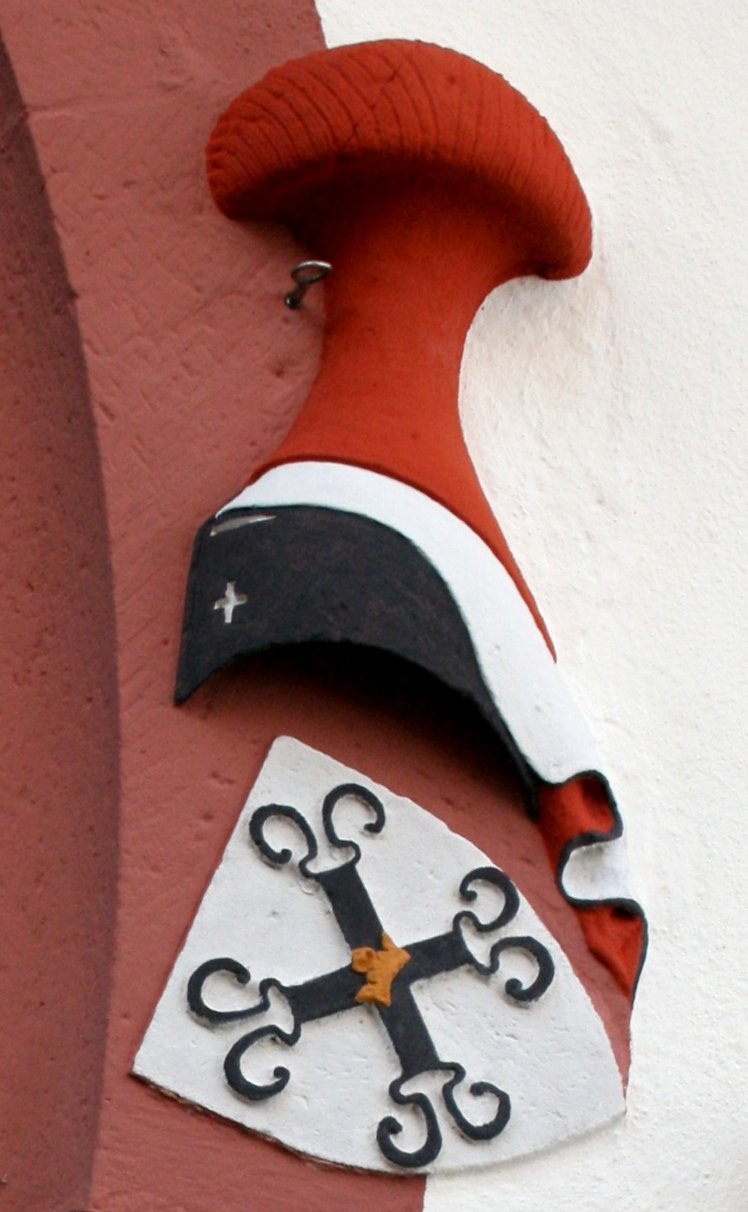
Detail of the church portal with the Büches von Lindheim coat of arms.

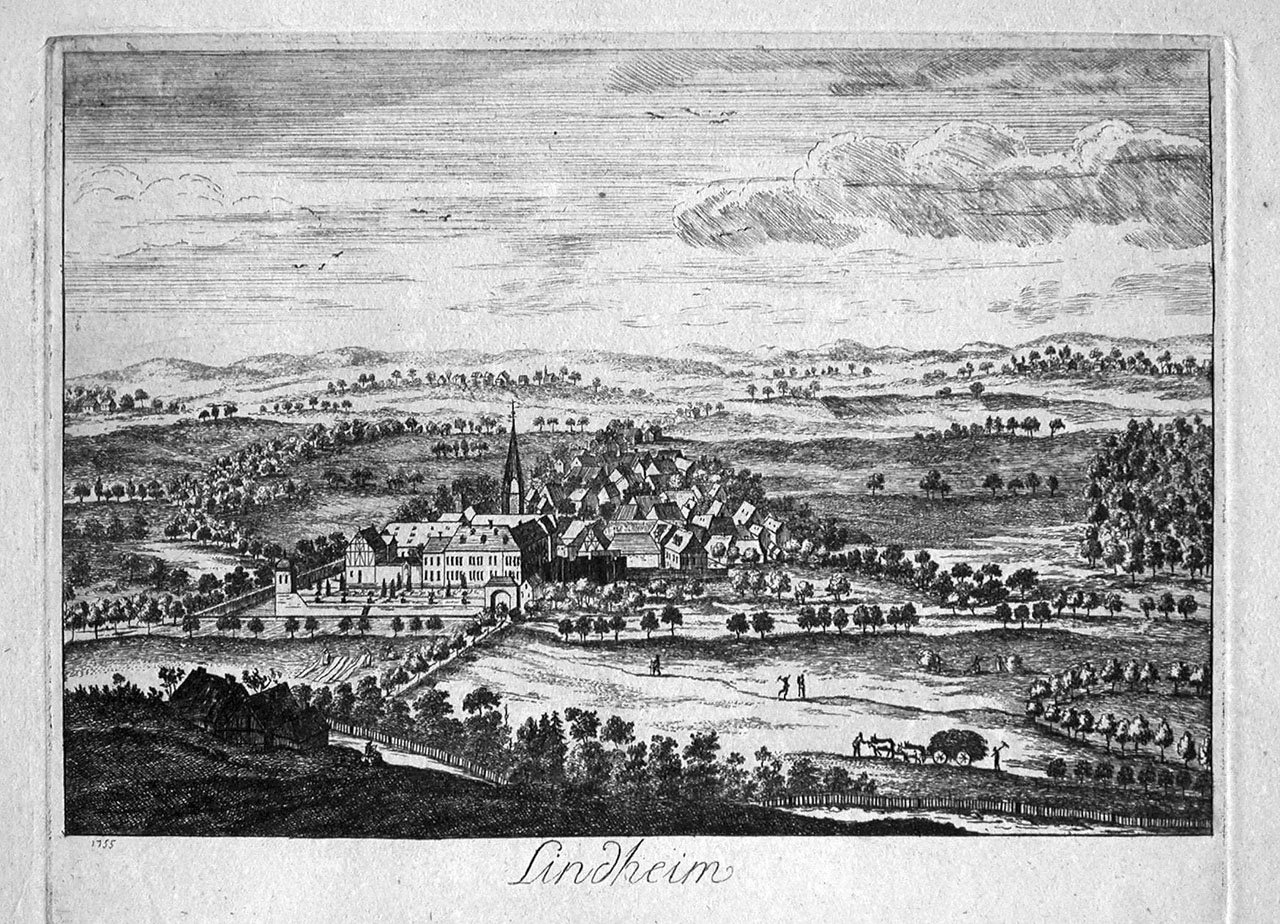
View of the schloss from the east in a 1755 copperplate by an unknown artist.

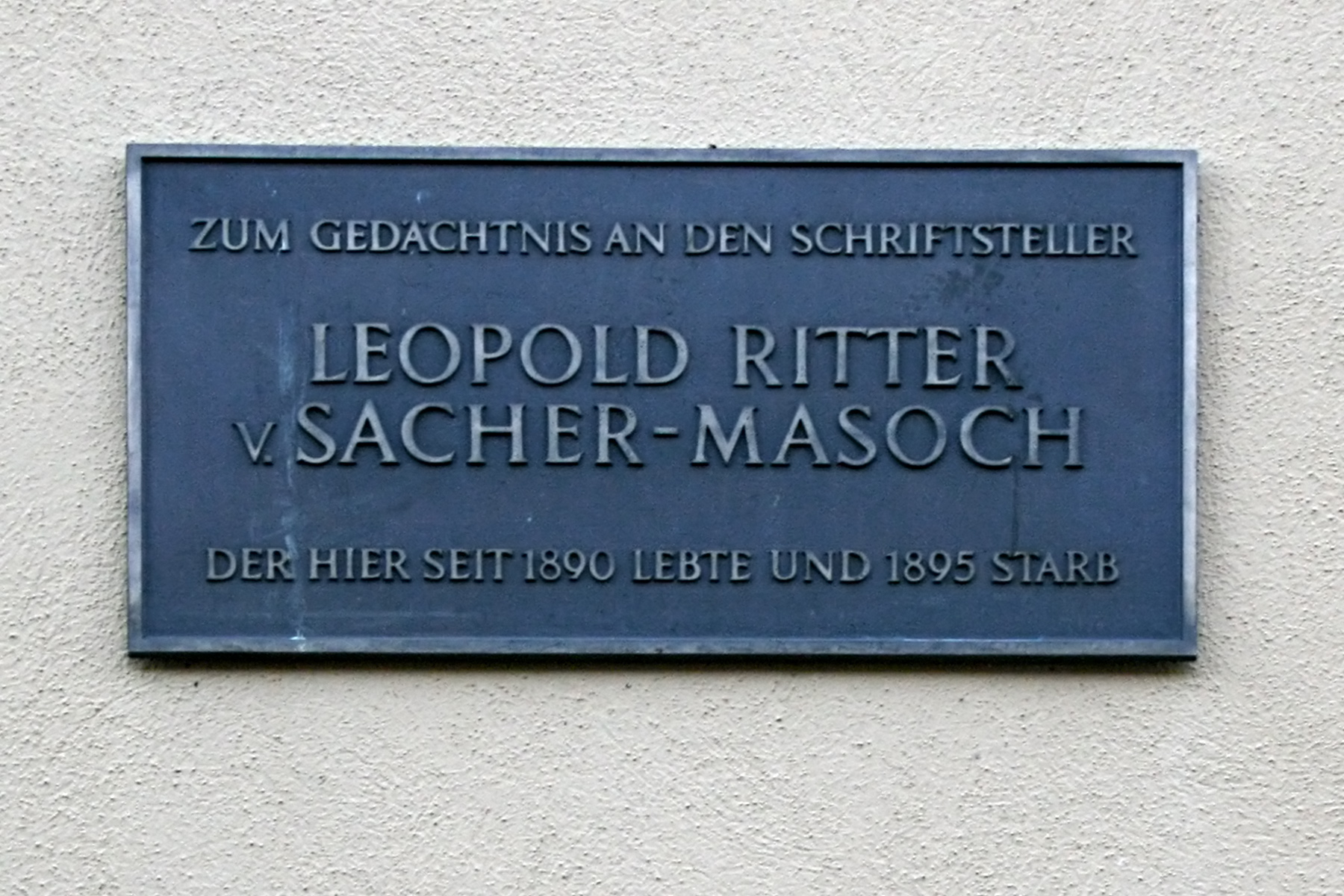
Memorial tablet for Leopold von Sacher-Masoch.

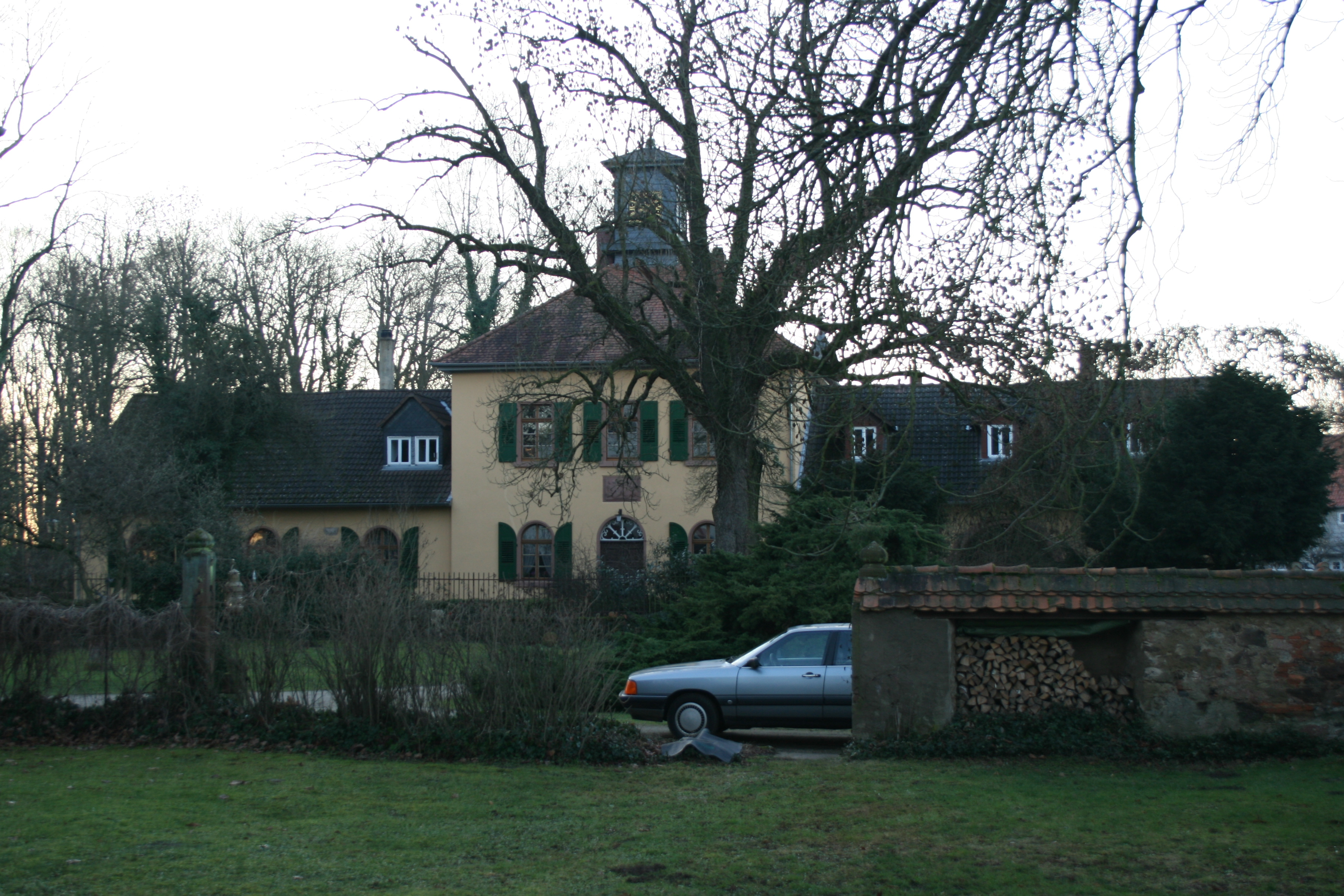
Mollersches Landhaus or Schlösschen, 2011.

== History ==
=== Medieval castle ===
The settlement of Lindheim was first mentioned in the records in 930 A.D. and initially belonged to the lords of Münzenberg. The first castle was probably destroyed in 1241. In 1289 Conrad von Büches was granted permission by King Rudolph to build a new castle in Lindheim, albeit not on the same spot.

In 1324, not long after the second castle was built it became the joint inheritance of several families: the von Büches, von Kransbergs and von Bommersheims. In 1391, no less than 17 families agreed a Burgfrieden and by the 15th century the number of joint owners or Ganerben had risen to 56, with frequent changes of hand. The Archbishop of Mainz also tried, in 1405, to gain a foothold on the castle and supported its expansion financially. In order to hold a balance of power against Mainz, however, the joint heirs subordinated themselves in 1458 to Count Palatine Frederick I, on whose side they fought during the Mainz Diocesan Feud.

From the early 15th century, the castle launched an increasing number of attacks on merchants on the road to the Frankfurt Trade Fair. The city of Frankfurt had the castle attacked in 1464, 1470, 1485 and 1490, but failed on each occasion. Frankfurt was thus unable to stem the robberies, whilst the number of joint heirs at this time continued to grow and also had the village of Lindheim surrounded by walls. The village was first referred to as a town in 1342 and was given imperially immediate, town-like rights until 1806.

The demise of the Ganerbschaft began with the Sickingen Feud in 1523 and was accelerated by the Thirty Years' War. The place was destroyed in 1623 and 1627, a further destruction followed in 1645 during the Hesse War by Hesse-Darmstadt troops. Interest in owning the destroyed castle crumbled. In 1618 the Rosenbachs and Wallensteins pledged their portion to the lords of Schlitz named von Görtz. In 1630 there were only four joint heirs left. In 1648 the seat was purchased by the lords of Oeynhausen.

=== Modern era schloss ===
After the war, Christian Ludwig von Oeynhausen had a schloss built that was finished in 1697. This used stones from the former castle. Later, the lords of Weitolshausen named Schrautenbach owned the house and, in 1736, Nikolaus Ludwig von Zinzendorf, who had been expelled from Saxony with the Herrnhuter Brüdergemeine, stayed here for a short time. In January 1747 the famous devotional writer, Friedrich Christoph Steinhofer, was appointed the head of the Theological Seminar of the Herrnhuter Brüdergemeine in Lindheim.

In the middle of the 19th century the last remaining parts of the castle with its turrets and gatehouses were demolished.

Until his death in 1895 the Austria writer, Leopold von Sacher-Masoch, lived in the Mollerschen Landhaus, a wing of the house. Today he is commemorated by a tablet on the building. A large fire in 1928 destroyed the main building of the schloss. The few remains are in private ownership and not accessible.

== Literature ==
- Karl Ernst Demandt: Geschichte des Landes Hessen, 2nd edn., Bärenreiter-Verlag, Kassel und Basel, 1972, ISBN 3-7618-0404-0, p. 467.
- Karl Ernst Demandt: Die Reichsganerbschaft Lindheim in der Wetterau. In: Hessisches Jahrbuch für Landesgeschichte 6, 1956, pp. 77–137 and 10, 1960, pp. 149–211.
- Siegfried R.C.T. Enders: Denkmaltopographie Bundesrepublik Deutschland, Abteilung: Baudenkmale in Hessen. Wetteraukreis I. published by the Landesamt für Denkmalpflege Hessen, Vieweg, Brunswick/ Wiesbaden 1982, ISBN 3-528-06231-2, pp. 42–49.
- Rudolf Knappe: Mittelalterliche Burgen in Hessen: 800 Burgen, Burgruinen und Burgstätten. 3rd edn., Wartberg-Verlag, Gudensberg-Gleichen, 2000, ISBN 3-86134-228-6, p. 356.
- Joachim Schneider: Ganerbschaften und Burgfrieden in der frühen Neuzeit – Relikte oder funktionale Adaptionen? In: Eckart Conze, Alexander Jendorff, Heide Wunder: Adel in Hessen. Herrschaft, Selbstverständnis und Lebensführung vom 15. bis ins 20. Jahrhundert. Historische Kommission für Hessen, Marburg, 2010, ISBN 978-3-942225-00-7 (Veröffentlichungen der Historischen Kommission für Hessen 70), pp. 129–148 and pp. 136–141.
- Schlösser, Burgen, alte Mauern. published by the Hessendienst der Staatskanzlei, Wiesbaden, 1990, ISBN 3-89214-017-0, p. 14.
