= Fuldaer Zeitung =

German newspaper in Fulda, Hesse

- Founder: Johannes Parzeller
- Publisher: Parzeller Verlag
- Editor-in-chief: Michael Tillmann
- Editor: Thomas Schmitt
- Founded: 1 January 1874
- Circulation: 51,000 (2012)
- Website: fuldaerzeitung.de

The Fuldaer Zeitung is a regional German daily newspaper for the city of Fulda and its region, the east of Hesse, published since 1 January 1874. As of 2012, with its regional subsidiaries (Kinzigtal-Nachrichten, Hünfelder Zeitung, and Schlitzer Bote) it has a total circulation of over 51,000.

The newspaper was founded by Johannes Parzeller, owner of the Fulda printing and publishing company Parzeller Verlag. The paper employs some 150 people, and also publishes the magazine of the local historical society, the Fuldaer Geschichtsblätter.

== History ==
The first copy appeared on 1 January 1874, printed in what was then called the Fuldaer Actiendruckerei. Around 1000 subscriptions to the Catholic-oriented paper, which appeared three times a week (five years later it was published daily).

In 1929 the paper warned its readers of the dangers of Nazi ideology: "The national socialism of the Hitler party, the overestimation of nationalism, the belief in violence and power can never agree with Catholic doctrine. The antisemitic tendencies and the injunctions toward violence hurt more than just Catholic convictions about state and society, but also the ten commandments, which apply to all humanity."

In 1933 was barred from publication for four days on the allegation that it had published a call from Catholic organizations critical of the government. The editorial and printing rooms were destroyed by SA and SS members on 10 December 1933. From 1935 to 1945 it was censored.

== Editors ==
| Name | Dates |
|---|---|
| Joseph Pauly | 1874–1877 |
| Dr. Johann Wilhelm Arenhold | 1877–1883 |
| Armin Kraussen | 1883–1885 |
| Ludwig Deibel | 1885–1895 |
| Joseph Braun | 1895–1907 |
| Karl Schütte | 1907–1921 |
| Dr. Johannes Kramer | 1921–1933 |
| Dr. Karl Austermann | 1933–1934 |
| Alfred Maria Ott | 1934–1935 |
| Justus Meinardi | 1935–1945 |
| Dr. Josef-Hans Sauer | 1951–1969 |
| Dr. Stefan Schnell | 1969–1981 |
| Hermann-Joseph Konze | 1981–1995 |
| Uwe-Bernd Herchen | 1995–2000 |
| Dr. Hermann-Josef Seggewiß | 2000–2011 |
| Michael Tillmann | seit 2011 |

== Bibliography ==
- Festschrift aus Anlass des 75-jährigen Geschäftsjubiläums der Firma Parzeller & Co. vormals Fuldaer Actiendruckerei Fulda 1873–1948.
- schreiben und drucken in Fulda 1874–1974, Parzeller Verlag 1974, ISBN 3-7900-0047-7.
- Gabor Steingart: „Widerspruch unerwünscht. Beobachtungen aus 111 Jahren Fuldaer Zeitung“, in: Fuldaer Hefte, Nr. 3, 1984, ISBN 3-924789-02-9.
