= Waldmannshausen Castle =

- Burg Waldmannshausen
- Elbtal (Hesse)
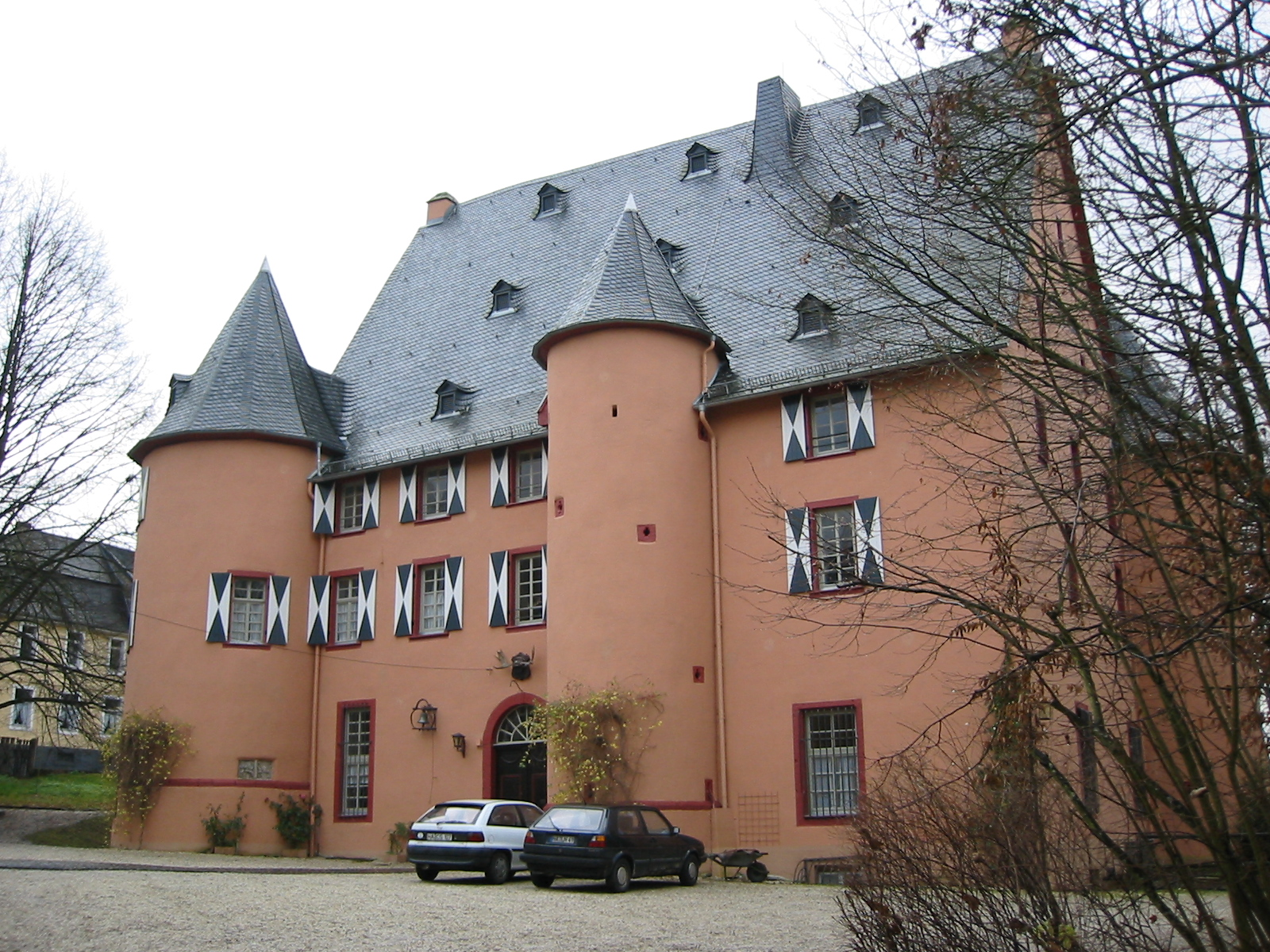
- Front of Waldmannshausen Castle

Site information
- Type: lowland castle
- Code: DE-HE
- Condition: preserved or largely preserved

Location
- Coordinates: 50°30′47.77″N 8°3′13.73″E
- Height: 198 m above sea level (NHN)

Site history
- Built: 1486

Garrison information
- Occupants: ministeriales

Waldmannshausen Castle (German: Burg Waldmannshausen) is a water castle built from 1486 to 1488 by Thebus of Waldmannshausen in the village of Elbgrund in the municipality of Elbtal) in the county of Limburg-Weilburg in the German state of Hesse. It is located about 18 kilometres north of the town of Limburg an der Lahn. The castle was once a single unit with the neighbouring estate of Waldmannshausen. On the land of the estate is another, ruined, water castle, the Alte Burg ("Old Castle"). The property is on the edge of the municipality on the road to Frickhofen. The castle and its associated schloss, built in 1790, have been used as a Schullandheim - a country educational facility used to enhance normal schools - since 1935. The castle is owned by Schullandheim Burg Waldmannshausen with its headquarters in Westphalian Hagen.

== History ==
The von Waldmannshausen family is first recorded in 1136. From the Walpodes of Waltmannshausen branched early on the other Walpode/Waldbotten lines, including Waldbott of Bassenheim.

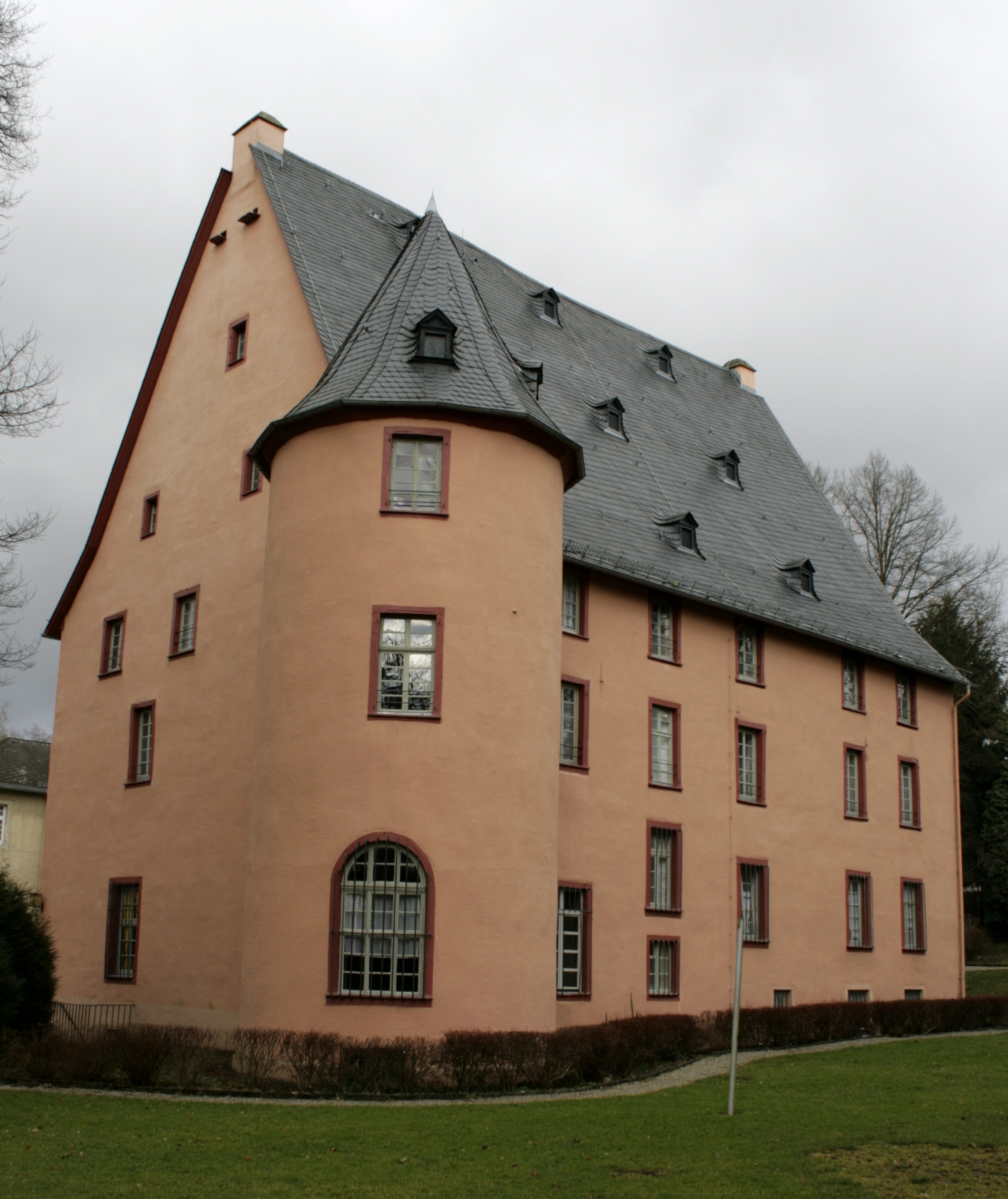
Rear of the castle

The builder of the present castle was Thebus (also: Debus = Matthäus) of Waldmannshausen, who died in 1506. He was the son of Gerard of Waldmannshausen and, during the 1480s, was a vassal of the counts of Nassau-Dillenburg.

In the 17th century the castle had become a ruin. In 1786 it was repaired by Christian Heinrich of Erath and, in 1790, expanded with a schloss next to the castle. After 1835, it changed hands more often and, in 1935, was acquired by the Schullandheim society of the Westphalian city of Hagen.

Today, castle and schloss are listed buildings and also have protected status in the event of war under the Hague Convention.

== Site ==
The "new castle" was built in 1486 as a Late Gothic water castle, initially without cellars. It is a three-storey, Late Gothic stone edifice with a steep, gabled roof. On two opposite corners there are round towers with conical roofs and, in the centre of the front, longer side, is a staircase tower. The moats have been levelled.

Opposite the castle is the old princely stable block (Marstall). The old estate farm borders on the castle terrain; for a long time it was a private farm and now only acts as a residential property.

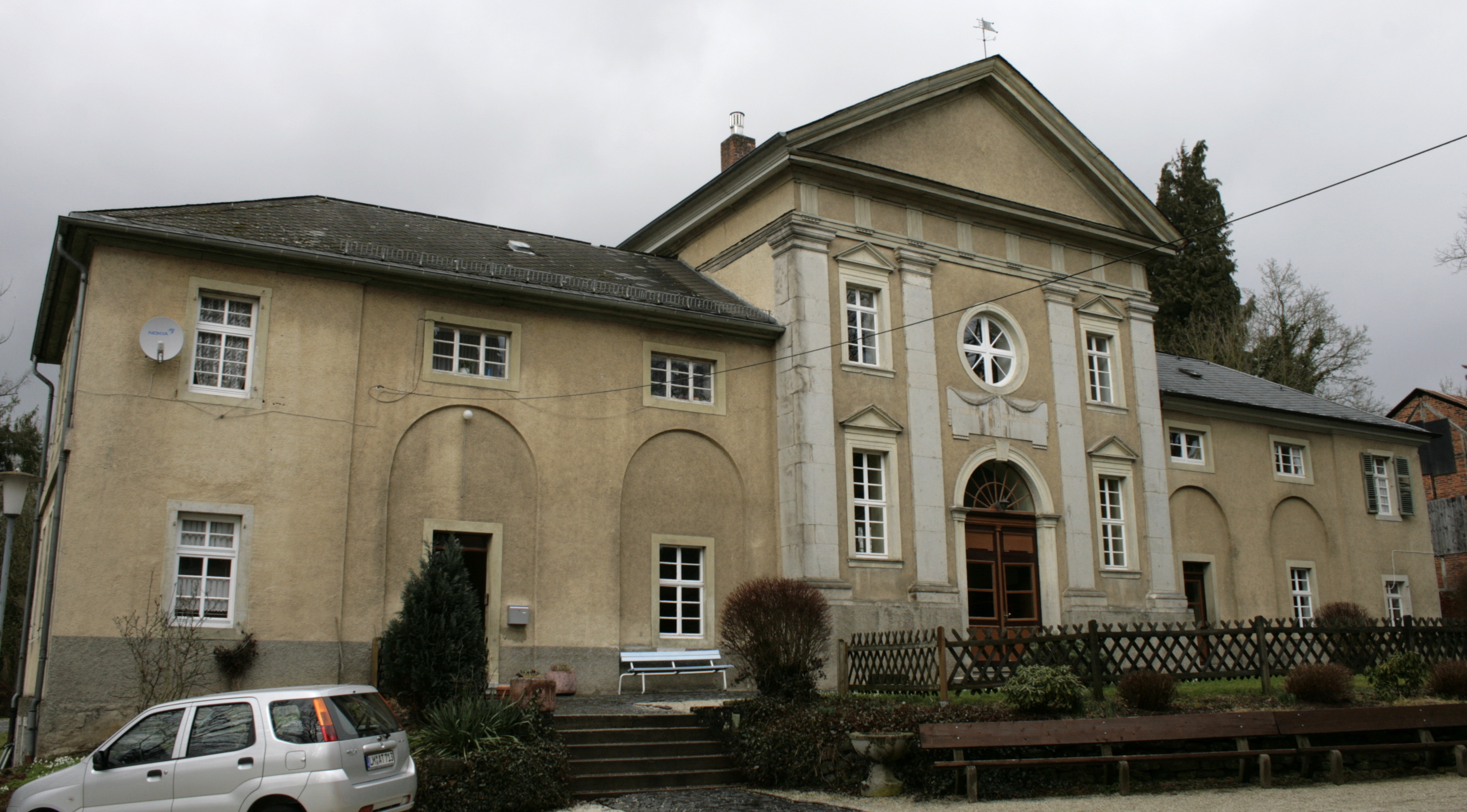
Old stable block

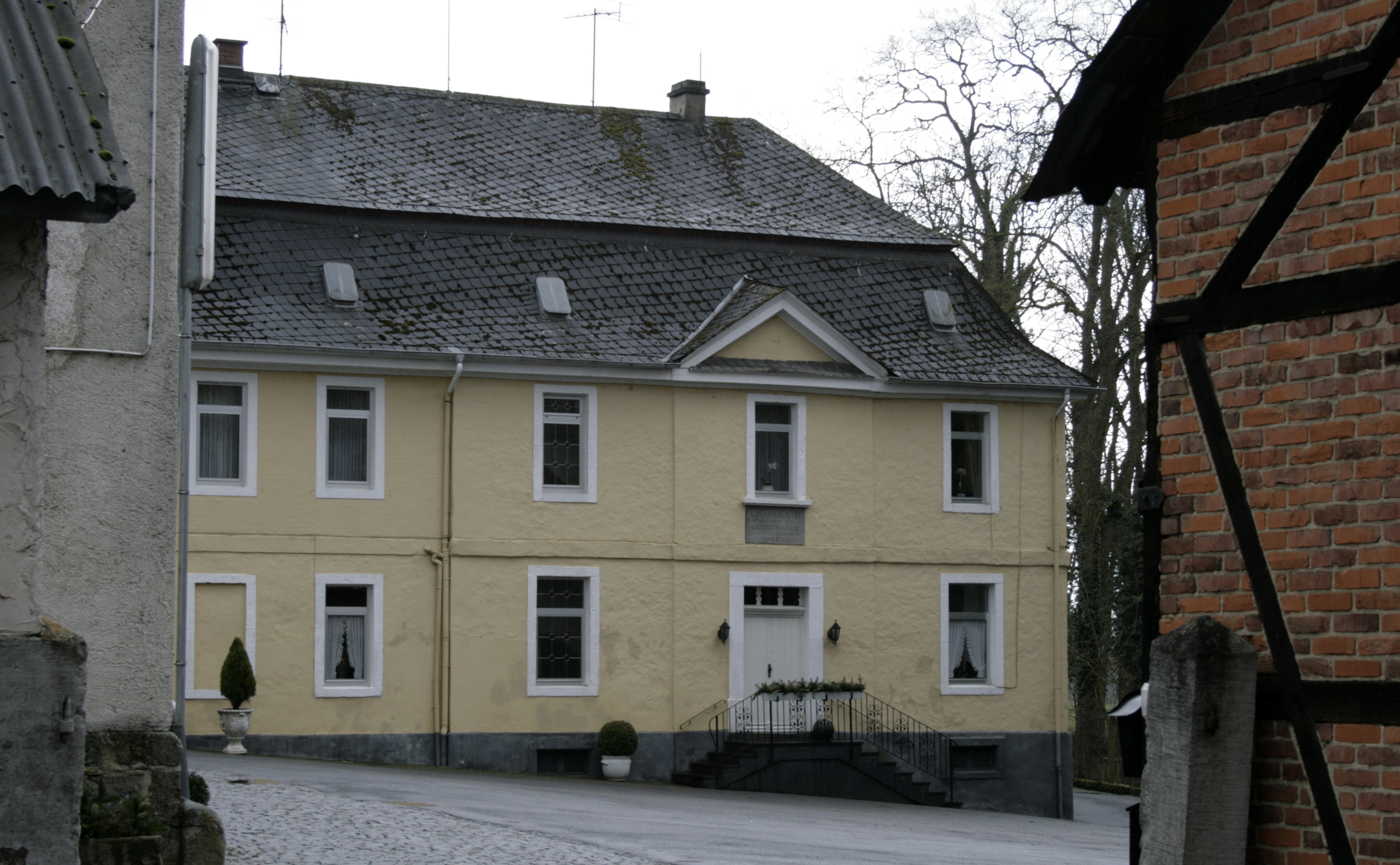
House on the old estate next to the castle

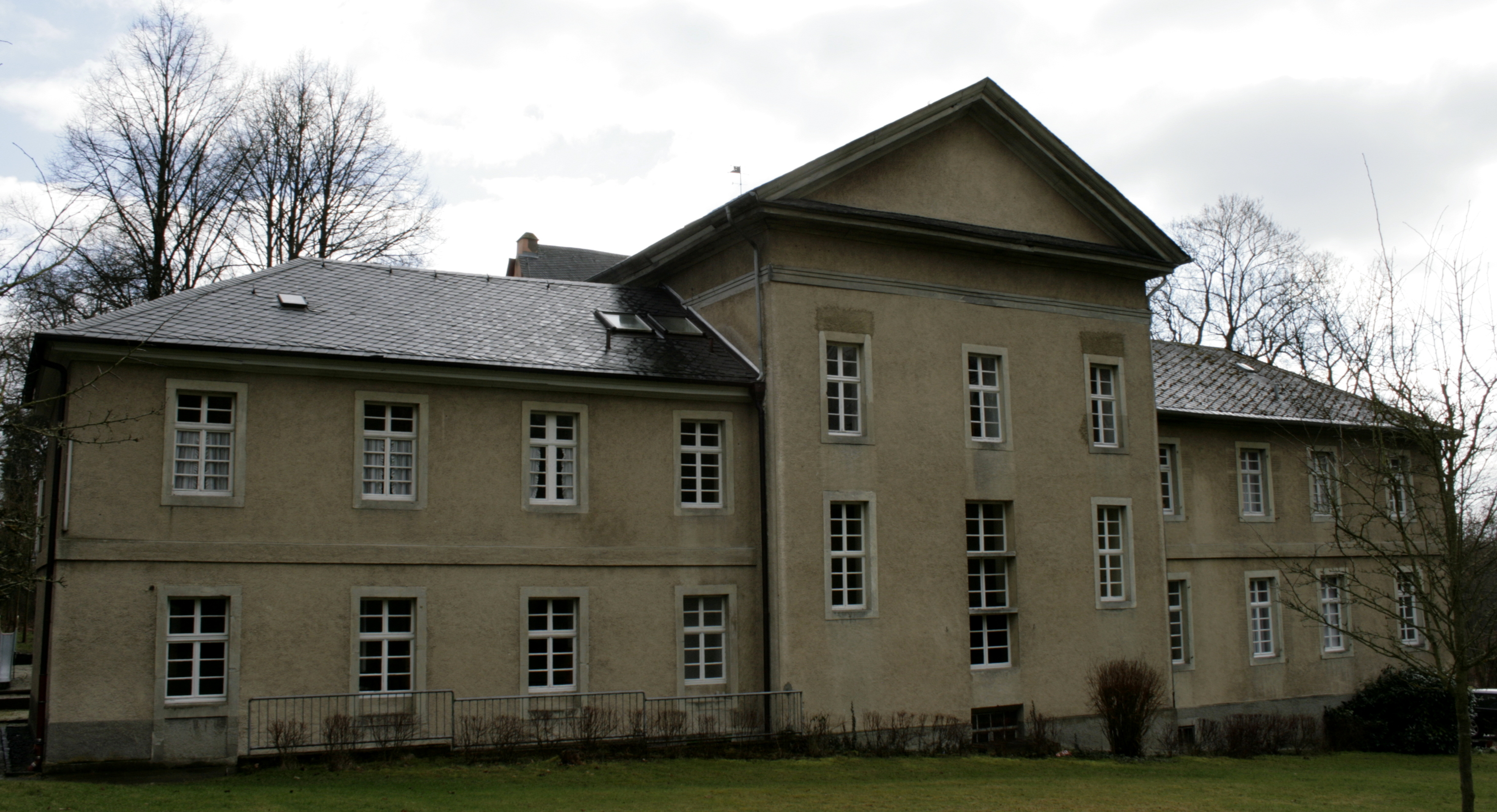
Rear of the old stables

== Literature ==
- Georg Dehio, Ernst Gall: Handbuch der deutschen Kunstdenkmäler – Südliches Hessen. Berlin, 1950.
- Rudolf Knappe: Mittelalterliche Burgen in Hessen: 800 Burgen, Burgruinen und Burgstätten. 3rd edition. Wartberg-Verlag, Gudensberg-Gleichen, 2000, ISBN 3-86134-228-6, pp. 444–445.
- Ferdinand Luthmer: Die Bau- und Kunstdenkmäler des Regierungsbezirks Wiesbaden. Vol. 3 (Lahngebiet). Walluf, 1973.
- Adolf-Krüper-Schullandheimverein Waldmannshausen (publ.): 500 Jahre Burg Waldmannshausen, Hagen, 1986, 84 pages.
