= Fuldaer Geschichtsblätter =

- Frequency: Irregular
- Publisher: Fuldaer Geschichtsverein
- Founded: 1912
- Country: Germany
- Based in: Fulda
- Language: German
- Website: geschichtsverein-fulda.de/wir.htm
- ISSN: 0016-2612
- OCLC: 499322563

The Fuldaer Geschichtsblätter is the official publication of the Fuldaer Geschichtsverein, the historical society of the German city of Fulda in Hesse, founded 1896. The magazine is published since 1912, for a while as a monthly supplement to the Fuldaer Zeitung, later irregularly. Publication was interrupted from 1915 to 1919 and from 1939 to 1953, and has continued since then.

Common abbreviations are FGBl. and FdGbll.
