= Ebersburg =

- Municipality
- Coat of arms

- Location of Ebersburg within Fulda district
- Interactive map of Ebersburg
- Location within Germany Location within Hesse
- Coordinates: 50°28′N 09°48′E
- Country: Germany
- State: Hesse
- Admin. region: Kassel
- District: Fulda

Government
  - Mayor (2022–28): Benjamin Reinhart

Area
  - Total: 37.05 km^{2} (14.31 sq mi)
- Elevation: 362 m (1,188 ft)

Population (2025-12-31)
  - Total: 4,637
  - Density: 125.2/km^{2} (324.2/sq mi)
- Time zone: UTC+01:00 (CET)
  - Summer (DST): UTC+02:00 (CEST)
- Postal codes: 36157
- Dialling codes: 06656
- Vehicle registration: FD
- Website: www.ebersburg.de

Ebersburg is a municipality in the district of Fulda, in Hesse, Germany.
