= Nüsttal =

- Municipality
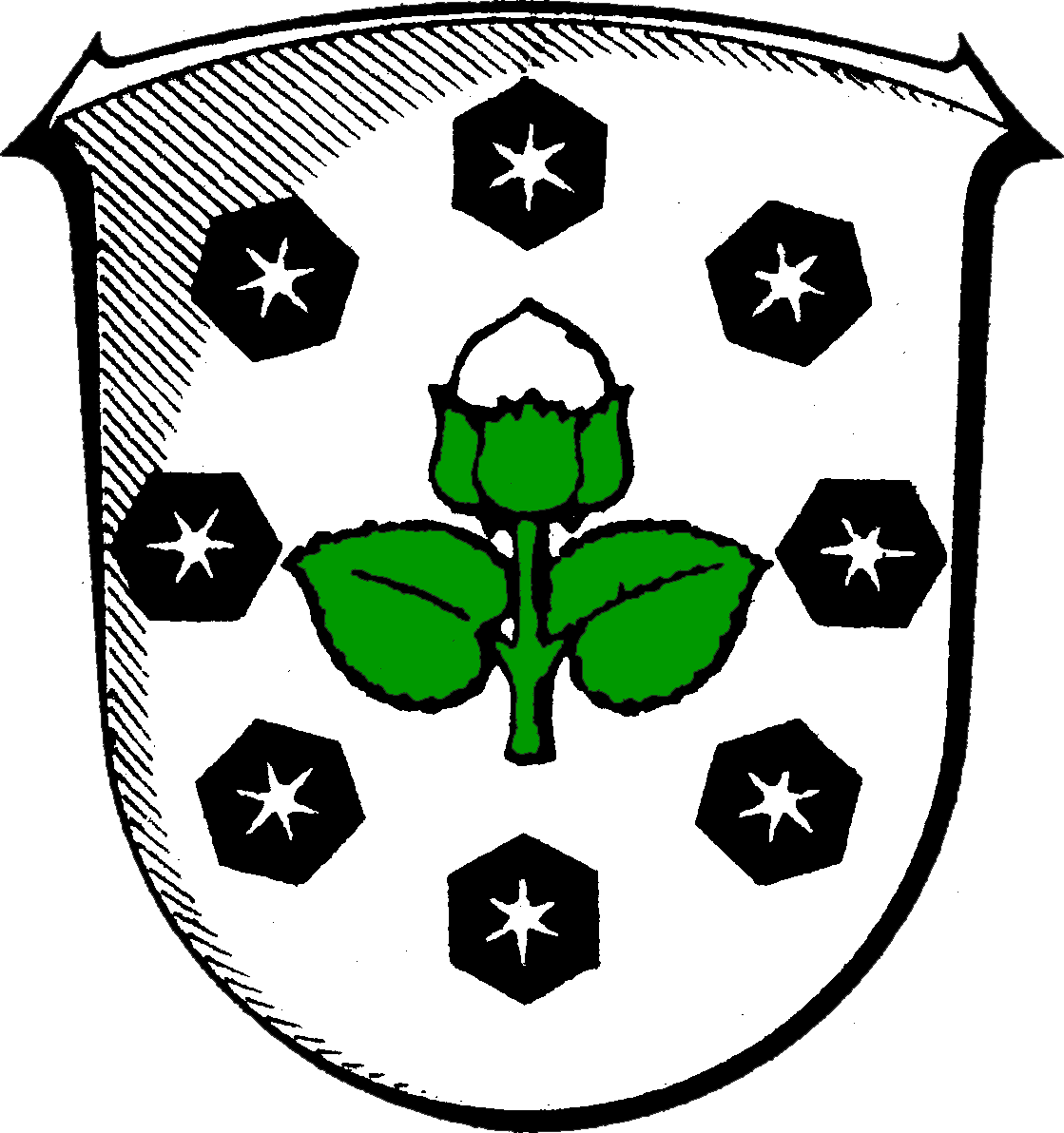
- Coat of arms

- Location of Nüsttal within Fulda district
- Interactive map of Nüsttal
- Location within Germany Location within Hesse
- Coordinates: 50°38′N 09°51′E
- Country: Germany
- State: Hesse
- Admin. region: Kassel
- District: Fulda

Government
  - Mayor (2021–27): Marion Frohnapfel (CDU)

Area
  - Total: 45.5 km^{2} (17.6 sq mi)
- Elevation: 361 m (1,184 ft)

Population (2025-12-31)
  - Total: 2,874
  - Density: 63.2/km^{2} (164/sq mi)
- Time zone: UTC+01:00 (CET)
  - Summer (DST): UTC+02:00 (CEST)
- Postal codes: 36167
- Dialling codes: 06684, 06652
- Vehicle registration: FD
- Website: www.nuesttal.de

Nüsttal is a municipality in the district of Fulda, in Hesse, Germany. Its seat is in the village Hofaschenbach.
