= Millipore =

Millipore may refer to:

- Millipore Corporation, a biosciences company acquired by Merck Group in 2010
- MilliporeSigma, former name of Sigma-Aldrich
- Merck Millipore, deprecated brand name used by Merck Group after Millipore acquisition
