= Lung cancer vaccine =

A lung cancer vaccine is a cancer vaccine for lung cancer.

Lung cancer vaccine may specifically refer to:

- CimaVax-EGF, the first therapeutic cancer vaccine developed to target lung cancer
- Stimuvax, which had promising results from a phase IIB trial for inoperable lung cancer
