= Michael Römer =

German business executive

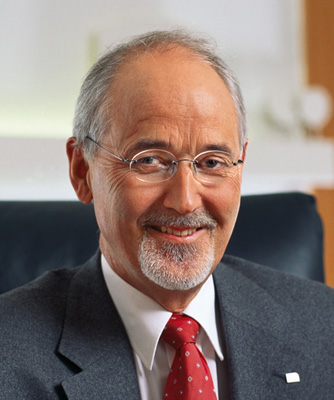
- Michael Römer (2006)
- Born: 23 December 1946 (age 79); Alheim, Hesse
- Occupations: CEO and chairman of Merck

Michael Römer (born 23 December 1946 in Alheim, Hesse) is a German business executive, and former chairman and CEO of Merck.

He grew up in Offenbach am Main, where his father was an engineer at Hoechst AG (now Sanofi). He studied chemistry at the Technical University of Darmstadt from 1968, and obtained a doctorate in chemistry in 1977. He was employed by Merck from 1978. He became a deputy member of the executive board in 1993 and a regular member in 1994. He became deputy chairman in 2000, and was chairman and CEO from 2005 to 2007.

Römer was president of the Chamber of Commerce and Industry of Darmstadt 2000–2009. He received the Officer's Cross of the Order of Merit of the Federal Republic of Germany in 2008.

Business positions
Preceded by Bernhard Scheuble	CEO of Merck; 2005–2007	Succeeded by Karl-Ludwig Kley
