= Pedro Reinhard =

American businessman

J. Pedro Reinhard is a business person who has served on the board of directors of the Dow Chemical Company, and The Coca-Cola Company.

Reinhard was executive vice president and chief financial officer of Dow Chemical from 1995 to 2005 when he retired.

After his retirement Reinhard remained with Dow Chemical as a senior advisor but was fired from the position along with company officer Romeo Kreinberg for negotiating a buyout of the company without the approval of the board of directors. Reinhard and Kreinberg sued Dow Chemical for defamation, and Dow Chemical filed a countersuit. The lawsuits were settled with Reinhard and Kreinberg admitting to participating in unauthorized discussions for a buyout of Dow.

Reinhard has been on the board of directors for The Dow Chemical Company, Dow Corning Corporation, The Coca-Cola Company, Royal Bank of Canada and Sigma-Aldrich Corporation.
