= Future Insight Prize =

Annual award

The Future Insight Prize is an award of up to €1 million which has been awarded since 2019 to celebrate the 350th anniversary of the company Merck. The award recognises creative solutions in the fields of health, nutrition and energy.

== Awardees ==
Recipients to date:

- 2019: Health: James Earl Crowe, Jr. (Vanderbilt University) and Pardis Sabeti (Broad Institute)
- 2020: Health: Stephan Sieber (Technical University of Munich)
- 2021: Nutrition: Ting Lu (University of Illinois) and Steve Techtmann (Michigan Technological University)
- 2022: Energy: Tobias J. Erb (Max Planck Institute for Terrestrial Microbiology)
- 2023: Health: Khalid Salaita (Emory University)
- 2024: Health: Lauren Gardner (Johns Hopkins University)
- 2025: Health: Magdalena Götz (Helmholtz Centre Munich)
