= Dannie Heineman Prize =

Dannie Heineman Prize may refer to:

- Dannie Heineman Prize for Astrophysics, awarded by the American Astronomical Society and American Institute of Physics
- Dannie Heineman Prize for Mathematical Physics, awarded by the American Physical Society and American Institute of Physics
- Dannie Heineman Prize (Göttingen), awarded by the Göttingen Academy of Sciences and Humanities
