= Robert W. Malone =

American physician and biochemist

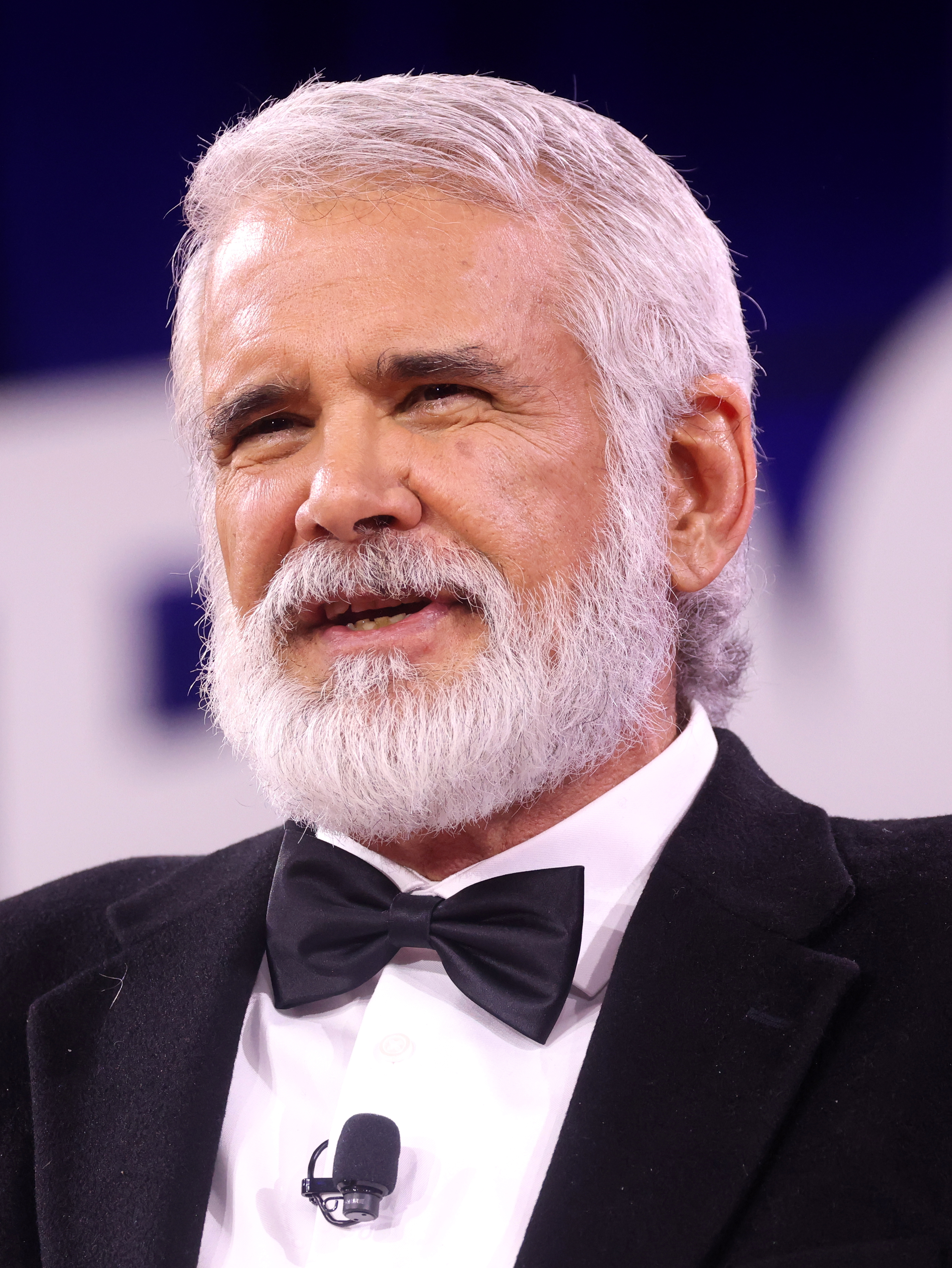
- Malone in 2025
- Born: Robert Wallace Malone; October 20, 1959 (age 67)
- Education: University of California, Davis (BS); University of California, San Diego (MS); Northwestern University (MD)
- Occupations: Physician; biochemist
- Spouse: Jill Glasspool Malone
- Children: 3
- Website: rwmalonemd.com

Robert Wallace Malone (born October 20, 1959) is an American physician and biochemist. His early work focused on mRNA technology, pharmaceuticals, and drug repurposing research. He is credited for the first successful transfection of designed mRNA packaged within a liposomal nanoparticle. During the COVID-19 pandemic, Malone promoted misinformation about the safety and efficacy of COVID-19 vaccines.

== Early life and education ==
Prior to studying medicine, Malone studied computer science at Santa Barbara City College for two years, acting as a teaching assistant in 1981. He received his BS in biochemistry from the University of California, Davis in 1984, his MS in biology from the University of California, San Diego in 1988, and his MD from Northwestern University Feinberg School of Medicine in 1991. He attended Harvard Medical School for a year-long postdoctoral studies program.

In the late 1980s, while a graduate student researcher at the Salk Institute for Biological Studies in San Diego, California, Malone conducted studies on messenger ribonucleic acid (mRNA) technology, discovering in what Nature has described as a landmark experiment that it was possible to transfer mRNA protected by a liposome into cultured cells to signal the information needed for the production of proteins. With Philip Felgner, he performed experiments on the transfection of RNA into human, rat, mouse, Xenopus, and Drosophila cells, work which was published in 1989. In 1990, he contributed to a paper with Jon A. Wolff, Dennis A. Carson, and others, which first suggested the possibility of synthesizing mRNA in a laboratory to trigger the production of a desired protein. These studies are recognized as among the earliest steps towards mRNA vaccine development.

== Career ==
In the decade after earning his MD, Malone taught pathology at the University of California, Davis and at the University of Maryland.

He has served as director of clinical affairs for Avancer Group, assistant professor at the University of Maryland School of Medicine, and an adjunct associate professor of biotechnology at Kennesaw State University. He was CEO and co-founder of Atheric Pharmaceutical, which in 2016 was contracted by the U.S. Army Medical Research Institute of Infectious Diseases to assist in the development of a treatment for the Zika virus by evaluating the efficacy of existing drugs. Until 2020, Malone was chief medical officer at Alchem Laboratories, a Florida pharmaceutical company. He has claimed he helped secure early-stage approval for research by Merck & Co. on an Ebola vaccine, in the mid-2010s.

As of 2021, Malone promoted himself as the inventor of mRNA vaccines; credit for the distinction is more often given to the lead authors on the major papers he contributed to (such as Felgner and Wolff), later advances by Katalin Karikó and Drew Weissman, or Moderna co-founder Derrick Rossi. Ultimately, mRNA vaccines were the decades-long result of the contributions of hundreds of researchers, including Malone. In April 2022, Davey Alba, writing for The New York Times, said that "[w]hile he was involved in some early research into the technology, his role in its creation was minimal at best", citing "half a dozen Covid experts and researchers, including three who worked closely with Dr. Malone."

=== COVID-19 research, 2020 ===
In early 2020, during the COVID-19 pandemic, Malone was involved in research through the Defense Threat Reduction Agency's DOMANE program into the heartburn medicine famotidine (Pepcid) as a potential COVID-19 treatment. His interest in the drug candidate followed early observational data suggesting that it may have been associated with higher COVID-19 survival. Malone, then with Alchem Laboratories, suspected famotidine may target an enzyme that the virus (SARS-CoV-2) uses to reproduce, and recruited a computational chemist to help design a 3D-model of the enzyme based on the viral sequence and comparisons to the 2003 SARS virus. After encouraging preliminary results, Alchem Laboratories, in conjunction with New York's Northwell Health, initiated a clinical trial on famotidine and hydroxychloroquine. Malone resigned from Alchem shortly after the trial began and Northwell paused the trial due to a shortage of hospitalized patients.

With another researcher, Malone successfully proposed to the publishers of Frontiers in Pharmacology a special issue featuring early observational studies on existing medication used in the treatment of COVID-19, for which they recruited other guest editors, contributors, and reviewers. The journal rejected two of the papers selected: one on famotidine co-authored by Malone and another submitted by physician Pierre Kory on the use of ivermectin. The publisher rejected the ivermectin paper due to what it stated were "a series of strong, unsupported claims" which they determined did "not offer an objective nor balanced scientific contribution." Malone and most other guest editors resigned in protest in April 2021, and the special issue has been pulled from the journal's website.

=== COVID-19 misinformation, 2021–present ===
Starting in mid-2021, Malone received criticism for propagating COVID-19 misinformation and conspiracy theories, including making "dangerous" and misleading claims about the toxicity of spike proteins generated by some COVID-19 vaccines; using interviews on mass media to popularize medication with ivermectin; and tweeting a study by others questioning vaccine safety that was later retracted. He said that LinkedIn temporarily suspended his account over a post stating that the Chairman of the Thomson Reuters Foundation was also a board member at Pfizer, and other posts questioning the efficacy of some COVID-19 vaccines. Malone has also falsely claimed that the Pfizer–BioNTech and Moderna COVID-19 vaccines could worsen COVID-19 infections, and that the Food and Drug Administration (FDA) had not granted full approval to the Pfizer vaccine in August 2021. Malone has promoted hydroxychloroquine and ivermectin as COVID-19 treatments. In a July 2021 interview, Malone admitted to taking the Moderna vaccine, claiming that he did so due to suffering from long COVID, and because he and his wife needed to travel.

In November 2021, Malone shared a deceptive video on Twitter that falsely linked athlete deaths to COVID-19 vaccines. In particular, the video suggested that Jake West, a 17-year-old Indiana high school football player who succumbed to sudden cardiac arrest, had actually died from COVID-19 vaccination. However, West had died years earlier, in 2013, due to an undiagnosed heart condition. Malone deleted the video from his Twitter account after receiving a cease-and-desist letter from West's family. Malone later said on Twitter that he did not know the video was doctored. On December 29, 2021, Twitter permanently suspended Malone from its platform, citing "repeated violations of our COVID-19 misinformation policy", after he shared on that platform a video about supposed harmful effects of the Pfizer vaccine. In an April 1, 2022 interview, Malone made the unfounded claim that COVID-19 vaccines are "damaging T cell responses" and "causing a form of AIDS". Malone claimed that he had "lots of scientific data" to back up his claim, but did not cite evidence. In July 2022, Malone, along with two other doctors, filed a lawsuit against Twitter for suspending their accounts, alleging a "breach of contract."

On December 30, 2021, Malone claimed on The Joe Rogan Experience podcast that "mass formation psychosis" was developing in American society in its reaction to COVID-19 just as during the rise of Nazi Germany. The term "mass formation psychosis" is not found in the Diagnostic and Statistical Manual of Mental Disorders, is not based on factual medical information, and is described by Steve Reicher, a professor of social psychology at the University of St Andrews, as "more metaphor than science, more ideology than fact." Following the episode, 270 physicians, scientists, academics, nurses and students wrote an open letter to Spotify complaining about the content of the podcast. On January 3, 2022, Congressman Troy Nehls entered a full transcript of The Joe Rogan Experience interview with Malone into the Congressional Record in order to circumvent what he said was censorship by social media.

Malone has spoken at anti-vaccine and anti-vaccine-mandate rallies, including a January 2022 rally in front of the Lincoln Memorial in Washington, D.C., and a March 2022 rally in Santa Barbara, California. As of April 2022, more than 134,000 users subscribe to Malone's Substack newsletter. According to media research firm Zignal Labs, Malone has been mentioned more than 300,000 times on social media, cable television, and print or online news outlets. In December 2022, Malone was reinstated on Twitter as a result of Elon Musk's revision of the site's COVID disinformation policy.

=== Advisory Committee on Immunization Practices ===
In June 2025, Secretary of Health and Human Services Robert F. Kennedy Jr. named Malone to the Advisory Committee on Immunization Practices. He was removed from the panel as a result of the lawsuit American Academy of Pediatrics v. Kennedy – in which federal judge Brian Murphy ruled that the entire panel's nominations violated federal law. Malone was rebuked in the ruling along with two other members, who the judge wrote "appear to lack the qualifications and experience to constitute expertise in vaccines and immunization.”

== Personal life and politics ==
Malone lives in Madison, Virginia, on a horse farm with his wife Jill Glasspool Malone, his high school sweetheart, whom he married c. 1979. She has a PhD in public policy from Union Institute and University. Although he and his wife have attended several conservative conferences, Malone says that he does not align with any political party.
