= Bernhard Scheuble =

German business executive

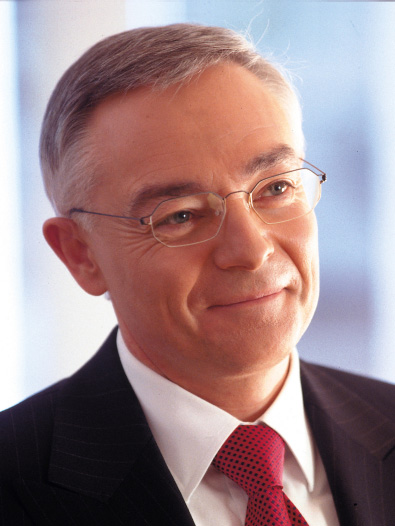
- Bernhard Scheuble (2003)
- Born: 1953 (age 72–73); Munich
- Occupations: CEO and chairman of Merck
- Predecessor: Hans Joachim Langmann
- Successor: Michael Römer

Bernhard Scheuble (born 1953 in Munich) is a German business executive and former chairman and CEO of Merck.

He studied physics at the University of Freiburg and did his doctoral research at the Fraunhofer Society. After obtaining a doctorate in physics, he was a researcher at the Fraunhofer Society until 1982, when he joined Merck. At Merck, he became director of the laboratory for liquid crystal research. From 1986 he was worked for Merck in Japan, where he built a research centre for liquid crystal research. He returned to Germany to join the company's senior management team, first as head of the liquid crystal division and then as head of the international pharmaceutical division. He became an honorary professor at the University of Stuttgart in 1997. In 1998 he became a member of the executive board. He became deputy CEO in February 2000 and became CEO in July 2000, succeeding Hans Joachim Langmann. In 2002, he also became a member of the executive board of Merck's holding company, E. Merck oHG. He retired as CEO on 20 November 2005.

He was awarded an honorary doctorate at the University of Hull. In 2015 he was awarded with the Order of the Rising Sun, Gold and Silver Star.

Business positions
Preceded by Hans Joachim Langmann	CEO of Merck; 2000–2005	Succeeded by Michael Römer
