= Helene von Roeder =

German business executive

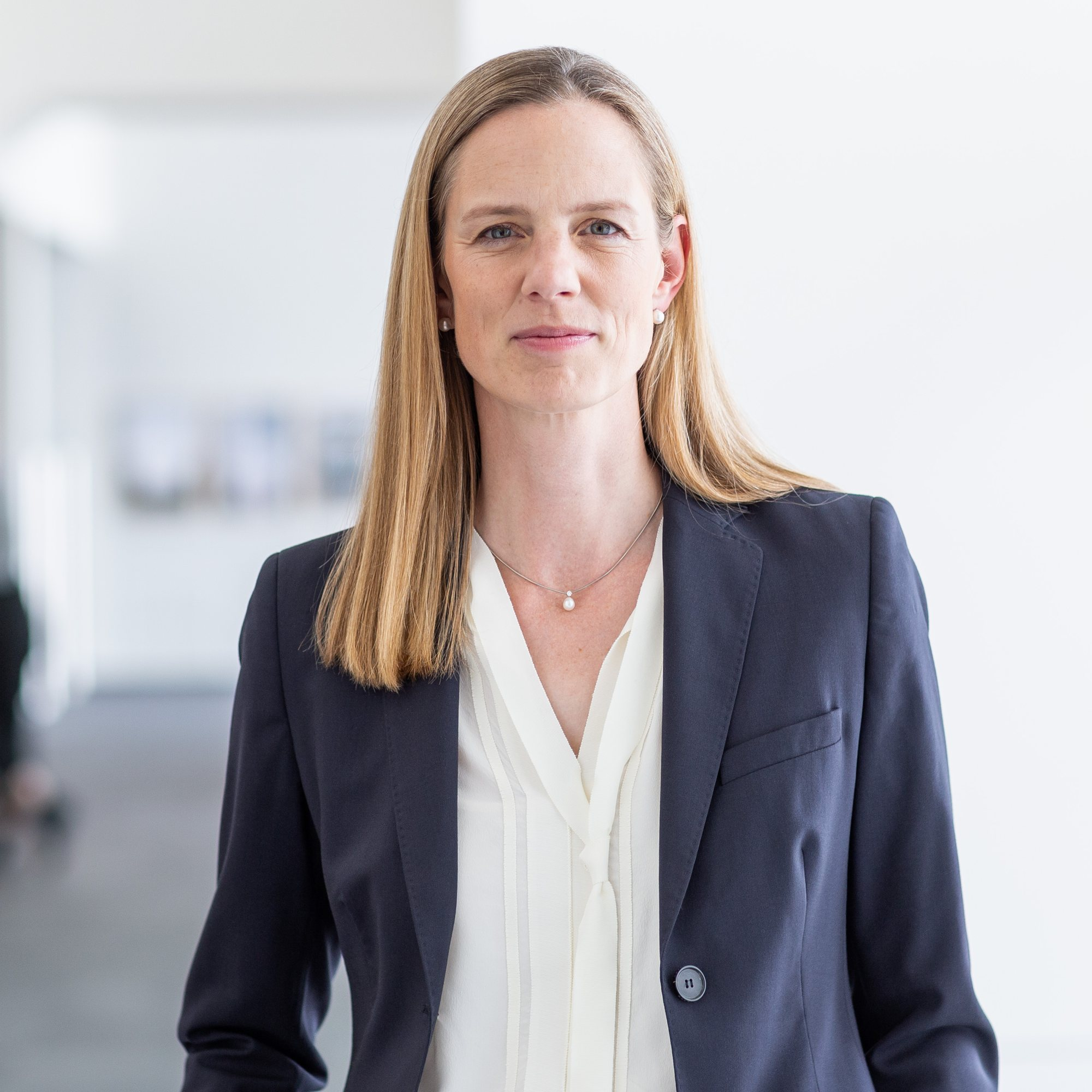
- von Roeder in 2019
- Born: 5 June 1970 (age 56); Heidelberg, Germany
- Education: LMU Munich, University of Cambridge (MPhil)
- Occupation: CFO of Merck Group
- Known for: executive board member at Merck Group and formerly Vonovia

Helene Freifrau Roeder von Diersburg, commonly known as Helene von Roeder, née Kley (born 5 June 1970), is a German business executive. From 2018 to 2023, she served on the executive board of Vonovia, where she was initially Chief Financial Officer (CFO) and from 2022 Chief Transformation Officer. Since July 2023, she has been Member of the Executive Board of Merck KGaA, where she serves as Chief Financial Officer, among other responsibilities.

== Education ==
From 1989 to 1993, von Roeder studied theoretical physics at LMU Munich. She then moved to Trinity College at the University of Cambridge, where she completed a Master of Philosophy in theoretical astrophysics in 1994.

== Career ==
=== Finance and banking ===
Von Roeder began her career in 1995 in risk control at Deutsche Bank in Frankfurt am Main. In 2000, she joined UBS in Frankfurt am Main and London, where she worked on alternative financing instruments for start-up companies.

In 2004, after a brief stint at Merrill Lynch, she joined Morgan Stanley as Head of Global Capital Markets for Germany and Austria. From 2012, she was responsible for capital markets business in Germany and Austria, and in 2013 she was appointed to the bank's regional board. Her projects as an investment banker included the initial public offering of the Kion Group and the sale of Daimler's stake in EADS.

In 2014, von Roeder moved to Credit Suisse as Chief Executive Officer (CEO) for Germany, Austria and Central Europe. In this role, she was responsible for all business in the region and was Member of the International Management Board. She was involved in the restructuring of the investment banking division.

=== Real estate ===
In early 2018, the real estate company Vonovia announced that von Roeder would join its executive board. Her appointment was part of a broader management restructuring. She initially took over the controlling function before being given full responsibility for Vonovia's finances. She also joined the supervisory board of the Austrian subsidiary BUWOG and took on oversight functions in further subsidiaries.

As CFO, von Roeder played a central role in Vonovia's acquisition of Deutsche Wohnen in 2021. In the course of integrating the two companies, the executive board was restructured: in early 2022, von Roeder assumed the role of Chief Transformation Officer, taking responsibility for digitalisation and innovation at Vonovia.

=== Science and technology ===
In July 2023, von Roeder joined Merck Group as CFO and Member of the Executive Board. From 2019, she had served on the supervisory board of Merck KGaA and on the shareholders' committee of E. Merck KG, where she also chaired the audit and finance committee.

== Other positions ==
- 2019–May 2023: Member of the supervisory board and shareholders' committee, Merck KGaA
- 2020–2023: Member of the Government Commission on the German Corporate Governance Code
- Since April 2025: Member of the supervisory board of E.ON SE

She is deputy chair of the Baden-Baden Entrepreneurs' Talks (Baden-Badener Unternehmer-Gespräche, BBUG) and a board member of the Deutsches Aktieninstitut (German Equity Institute).

Von Roeder is one of few women serving on the executive board of a DAX company. In 2025, she gave an interview to Stern in which she stated that women must and should pursue their own career paths, particularly where companies offer options for balancing family and career.

== Personal life ==
Von Roeder's father Max Dietrich Kley was the former CFO of BASF, and her grandfather Gisbert Kley was a Siemens board manager. Karl-Ludwig Kley, who served as CEO of Merck from 2007 to 2016, is her uncle.

Von Roeder is married and has three children.
