= Oschmann =

Oschmann is a German surname. Notable people with the surname include:

- Ingo Oschmann (born 1969), German comedian, entertainer, stage magician, television presenter, and actor
- Stefan Oschmann (born 1957), German businessman, CEO and chairman of Merck Group
