= Tobias J. Erb =

German biologist (born 1979)

Tobias J. Erb (born 9 May 1979 in Emmendingen) is a German biologist and chemist who has been the Director of the Max Planck Institute for Terrestrial Microbiology in Marburg since 2017. His research focuses on microbial biochemistry and synthetic biology. He is particularly focused on the fixation and conversion of the greenhouse gas CO_{2}.

== Career ==
Erb studied chemistry and biology at the University of Freiburg, where he graduated in 2005 with a diploma in biology and a master's degree in chemistry. From 2005 to 2009, he completed his doctoral thesis in microbiology at the University of Freiburg and Ohio State University. After his doctorate, he did postdoctoral research at the Carl R. Woese Institute for Genomic Biology at the University of Illinois from 2009 to 2011. From 2011 to 2014, Erb led a junior research group at ETH Zurich. In 2014, he moved to the Max Planck Institute for Terrestrial Microbiology in Marburg as Max Planck Research Group Leader, where he was appointed Director in 2017. Since 2018, Erb has also been Professor of Biochemistry at the University of Marburg.

== Research ==
Erb's research focuses on microbial carbon metabolism, in particular the biochemistry and synthetic biology of carbon dioxide conversion. His research focuses on the discovery, function and design of novel enzymes for the conversion of carbon dioxide in bacteria, algae and plants, and their use for synthetic photosynthesis. In 2016, Erb and his team succeeded in realising the first engineered metabolic pathway for CO_{2} fixation. In 2020, his research team was able to demonstrate the first synthetic chloroplast. As part of a Max Planck research team, he was able to molecularly reconstruct the evolution of the Rubisco enzyme in 2022, using a combination of synthetic and evolutionary biology in the laboratory.

== Awards (selection) ==
- 2013–2018 Member of the Young Academy
- 2013 Swiss Society for Microbiology Encouragement Award
- 2015 Talented 12-List of C&EN from the American Chemical Society
- 2016 Heinz Maier-Leibnitz-Prize
- 2017 Forschungspreis der Vereinigung für Allgemeine und Angewandte Mikrobiologie
- 2018 Otto Bayer Award
- 2021 Member of the European Molecular Biology Organization
- 2021 Prix Forcheurs Jean-Marie Lehn (together with Jean-Christophe Baret)
- 2022 Future Insight Prize of Merck KGaA
- 2024 Gottfried Wilhelm Leibniz Prize
- 2024 ERC Research Grant

== Selected publications ==
- Scheffen, Marieke; Marchal, Daniel G.; Beneyton, Thomas; et al. (4 January 2021). "A new-to-nature carboxylation module to improve natural and synthetic CO2 fixation". Nature Catalysis. 4 (2): 105–115. doi:10.1038/s41929-020-00557-y. hdl:21.11116/0000-0007-D559-5. ISSN 2520-1158.
- Miller, Tarryn E.; Beneyton, Thomas; Schwander, Thomas; et al. (8 May 2020). "Light-powered CO 2 fixation in a chloroplast mimic with natural and synthetic parts". Science. 368 (6491): 649–654. doi:10.1126/science.aaz6802. ISSN 0036-8075. PMC 7610767. PMID 32381722.
- Schada von Borzyskowski, Lennart; Severi, Francesca; Krüger, Karen; et al. (21 November 2019). "Marine Proteobacteria metabolize glycolate via the β-hydroxyaspartate cycle". Nature. 575 (7783): 500–504. Bibcode:2019Natur.575..500S. doi:10.1038/s41586-019-1748-4. ISSN 0028-0836. PMID 31723261.
- Schwander, Thomas; Schada von Borzyskowski, Lennart; Burgener, Simon; Cortina, Niña Socorro; Erb, Tobias J. (18 November 2016). "A synthetic pathway for the fixation of carbon dioxide in vitro". Science. 354 (6314): 900–904. Bibcode:2016Sci...354..900S. doi:10.1126/science.aah5237. ISSN 0036-8075. PMC 5892708. PMID 27856910.

== Trivia ==
- In 2024, Tobias Erb became Hessian state vice-champion over 800 metres in the age category M45.
