= Rasha Kelej =

Egyptian Senator and businesswoman

- رشا قلج
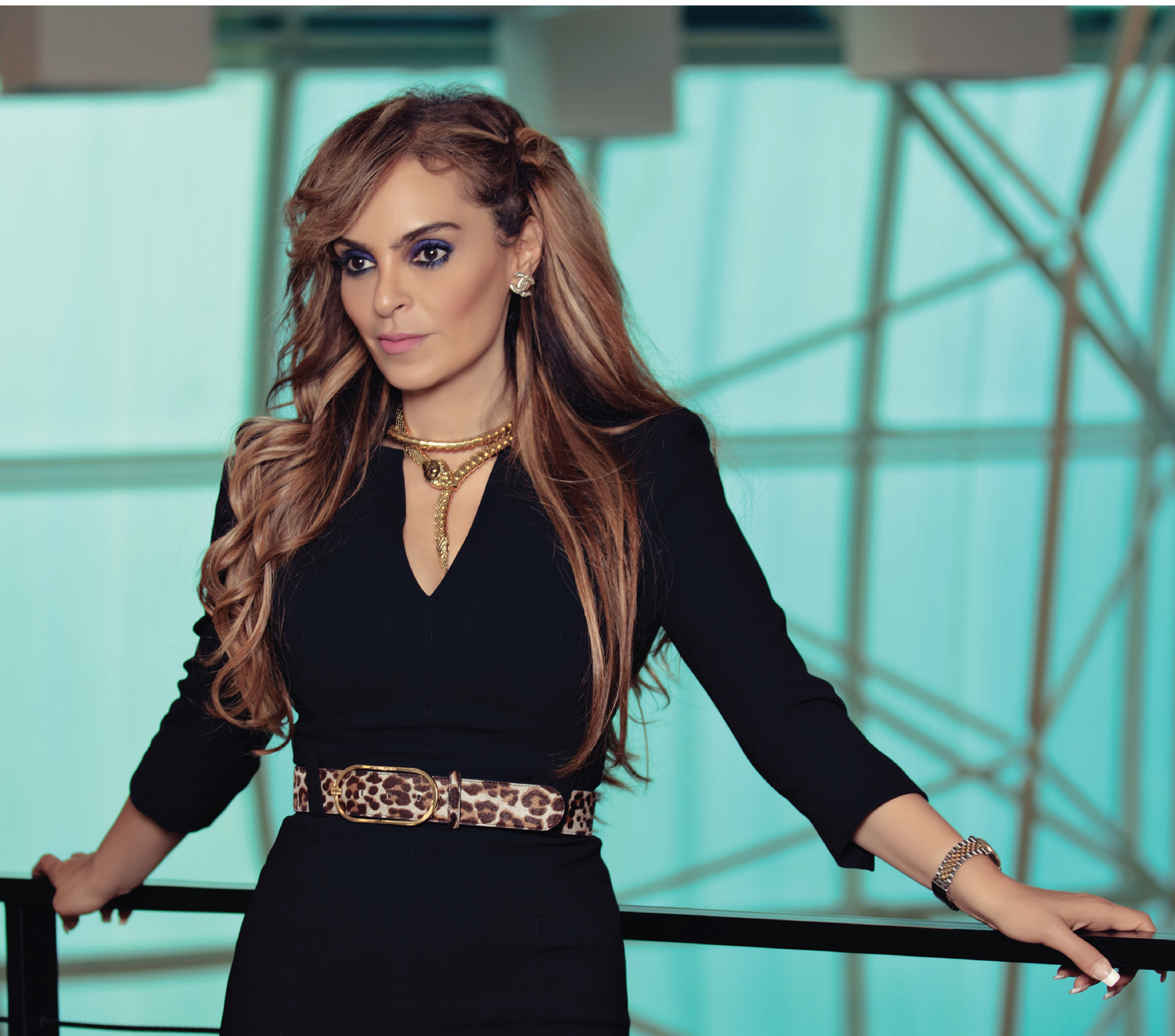
- Kelej in 2021

Member of the Egyptian Senate
- Incumbent
- Assumed office 18 October 2020
- Appointed by: Abdel Fattah el-Sisi

Rasha Kelej (Arabic: رشا قلج) is an Egyptian Senator . Among the 100 appointments made by President Abdel Fattah el-Sisi to the Senate in 2020, she will serve a five-year term. Kelej has been working for women's empowerment and improved access to healthcare in African and other developing countries.

== Biography ==
Kelej was born in 1972 in Alexandria and pursued a degree in pharmacy at Alexandria University. She started working in the pharmaceutical industry in 1994 and joined Merck KGaA in 1996. She was appointed as the CEO of Merck Foundation in 2016 and co-led the UNESCO-Merck Africa Research Summit.

Kelej has been behind campaigns like "More than a Mother " Campaign which helps in breaking the stigma around infertility and empowering infertile and childless women in Africa. and trained fertility specialists in countries like Gambia, Sierra Leone, Guinea, Liberia, Chad and Niger and the Central African Republic. Kelej's campaign partnered with several first ladies of African countries.

Rasha has also enabled to train many healthcare providers in many critical and underserved specialties such as oncology, diabetes, cardiovascular, respiratory, intensive care, endocrinology and sexual and reproductive heath through Merck Foundation programs.

In 2019, Kelej was included in New African Magazine's list of the 100 Most Influential Africans.

== Selected publications ==
- Tiziano Peccia, Rasha Kelej, Ahmed Hamdy, and Ahmed Fahmi. "A reflection on Public-Private Partnerships’ contribution to the attainment of Sustainable Development Goals.", Scienza e Pace - Università di Pisa, 8.1 (2017): Research Papers.

- Hamdy, Ahmed, Mohammed Kyari, Marie Johnson, Ahmed Fahmi, and Tiziano Peccia. “Towards women participation in scientific research in Africa (book)" Published by African Union Scientific, Technical and Research Commission (AU-STRC).
