= Mirus Bio =

Mirus Bio LLC
- Formerly: Mirus Bio Corporation
- Founded: 1995; 31 years ago
- Founders: Jon A. Wolff; James E. Hagstrom; Vladimir G. Budker
- Headquarters: Madison, Wisconsin, USA
- Owner: Merck Group
- Website: www.mirusbio.com

Mirus Bio LLC develops and manufactures transfection reagents, electroporation solutions and related products for life science research. Founded in 1995, it was formerly known as Mirus Bio Corporation.

On August 1, 2024, Merck Group announced that it had completed the acquisition of the company for approximately US$600 million.

== History ==
Mirus Corporation was founded in Madison, Wisconsin in 1995 by three University of Wisconsin - Madison scientists: Jon A. Wolff, James E. Hagstrom and Vladimir G. Budker. Mirus focused on developing innovative non-viral gene delivery technologies for gene therapy applications. These innovations also served as the basis for the company's transfection formulations and nucleic acid labeling and conjugation chemistries.

Mirus researchers published several groundbreaking achievements including: the first demonstrations that plasmid DNA could be effectively delivered to the rodent liver and skeletal muscle cells using rapid intravascular injections; the first demonstration that ‘caged’ DNA-containing nanoparticles are resistant to aggregation under physiologic salt conditions; the first demonstration of siRNA-mediated knockdown of an endogenously expressed gene in mice; development of low-toxicity, DNA-containing nanoparticles for gene delivery to the lungs; development of a clinically viable, high efficiency method for delivering plasmid DNA into mammalian skeletal muscle; development of a genetic immunization method for research animals; development of a technology for targeted delivery of siRNA to mouse liver; new chemistries for transfection; development of a non-viral vector providing sustained liver-specific transgene expression for more than one year.

In 2008 the Therapeutics Division was acquired by Hoffmann-La Roche Inc. Mirus’ former Research Tools Division remains an independent entity now known as Mirus Bio LLC.
