= Regine Kahmann =

German microbiologist (born 1948)

- Born: 20 October 1948 (age 77)
- Scientific career
- Fields: Microbiology; Molecular Phytopathology
- Institutions: Max Planck Institute for Terrestrial Microbiology

Regine Kahmann (born 20 October 1948 in Staßfurt, Saxony-Anhalt) is a German microbiologist and was Director at the Max Planck Institute for Terrestrial Microbiology in Marburg from 2000 to 2019. She was made a Foreign Member of the Royal Society (ForMRS) in 2020.

Kahmann's early work focused on microbiology and phages. She later switched to studying corn smut (Ustilago maydis), and the causes of disease in maize. Corn smut is now considered a model organism for the study of biotrophic fungi.

== Early life ==
Regine Kahmann was born in Staßfurt, Saxony-Anhalt in 1948 to Werner and Elfriede Kahmann. Her parents were farmers in Langenweddingen, near Magdeburg in East Germany. Due to land reform and political repression, her family left the German Democratic Republic in 1952, settling in Rassau, near Uelzen in Lower Saxony.

== Career ==
After graduating from the Lessing School in Uelzen in 1967, Kahmann studied biology at the University of Göttingen with a focus on microbiology until 1972. Following her doctorate from 1972 to 1974 at the Max Planck Institute for Molecular Genetics and the Free University of Berlin with the theme The structure of SPP1 DNA after transfection of B. subtilis. As a postdoctoral fellow, she went to Cold Spring Harbor Laboratory in the US, where she became in 1976 Junior Group Leader. From 1980 to 1982, she worked as a research assistant at the Max Planck Institute for Biochemistry in Martinsried. In 1982, she started an independent research group at the Max Planck Institute for Molecular Genetics in Berlin followed by appointments at the Institute of Gene-Biological Research in Berlin (1987), and professor of genetics at the Institute for Genetics and Microbiology at LMU Munich (1992). In January 2000, Kahmann became a scientific member of the Max Planck Society and director at the Max Planck Institute for Terrestrial Microbiology in Marburg, and in April 2001 also a professor of genetics at Marburg University. In 2019, she became the acting head of the Department of Organismic Interactions at the Max Planck Institute in Marburg.

== Research ==
Kahmann works in the field of the molecular phytopathology – the molecular basis of plant diseases. She examines, among other things, how microbes and viruses infect cells and which genes influence these attacks. "In her work on phage mu – a virus that affects a whole range of bacterial species – Regine Kahmann was able to show, among other things, that the decision as to which host can be infected is regulated by inversion of a certain section of DNA. The inversion is done by site-specific recombination. Regine Kahmann was able to show that this process is stimulated by the bacterial host's FIS protein in addition to the actual recombinase, the elucidation of the stimulation mechanism is internationally considered a scientific masterpiece."

A major research focus in her lab is the investigation of the infection mechanism of a parasitic fungus, corn smut (Ustilago maydis), which causes tumors on maize plants.

== Academy memberships ==
- 1991 European Molecular Biology Organization
- 1999 Bavarian Academy of Sciences (since 2001 as corresponding member)
- 1998 Academia Europaea
- 2001 Berlin-Brandenburg Academy of Sciences
- 2008 German Academy of Sciences Leopoldina
- 2010 Academia Net
- 2020 Royal Society (foreign member)

== Prizes and awards ==
- 1993 Leibniz Prize of the German Research Foundation
- 1997 Dannie Heineman Prize of the Göttingen Academy of Sciences
- 1998 Order of Merit of the Federal Republic of Germany
- 1999 Bavarian Maximilian Order for Science and Art
- 2011 Gregor Mendel Medal of the Leopoldina
- 2011 TUM Distinguished Affiliated Professor (honorary professor) of the Technical University of Munich
- 2021 Member, National Academy of Sciences
- 2023 Member, American Academy of Arts and Sciences

== Selected work ==
- Dean, Ralph; Van Kan, Jan A. L.; Pretorius, Zacharias A.; Hammond-Kosack, Kim E.; Di Pietro, Antonio; Spanu, Pietro D.; Rudd, Jason J.; Dickman, Marty; Kahmann, Regine; Ellis, Jeff; Foster, Gary D. (6 March 2012). "The Top 10 fungal pathogens in molecular plant pathology". Molecular Plant Pathology. 13 (4). Wiley: 414–430. Bibcode:2012MolPP..13..414D. doi:10.1111/j.1364-3703.2011.00783.x. ISSN 1464-6722. PMC 6638784. PMID 22471698.
- Fernández-Álvarez, Alfonso; Marín-Menguiano, Miriam; Lanver, Daniel; Jiménez-Martín, Alberto; Elías-Villalobos, Alberto; Pérez-Pulido, Antonio J.; Kahmann, Regine; Ibeas, José I. (1 March 2012). Howlett, Barbara J. (ed.). "Identification of O-mannosylated Virulence Factors in Ustilago maydis". PLOS Pathogens. 8 (3) e1002563. Public Library of Science (PLoS). doi:10.1371/journal.ppat.1002563. ISSN 1553-7374. PMC 3295589. PMID 22416226.
- Djamei, Armin; Schipper, Kerstin; Rabe, Franziska; Ghosh, Anupama; Vincon, Volker; Kahnt, Jörg; Osorio, Sonia; Tohge, Takayuki; Fernie, Alisdair R.; Feussner, Ivo; Feussner, Kirstin; Meinicke, Peter; Stierhof, York-Dieter; Schwarz, Heinz; Macek, Boris; Mann, Matthias; Kahmann, Regine (2011). "Metabolic priming by a secreted fungal effector". Nature. 478 (7369). Springer Science and Business Media LLC: 395–398. Bibcode:2011Natur.478..395D. doi:10.1038/nature10454. ISSN 0028-0836. PMID 21976020. S2CID 4425927.
- Voll, Lars (2011). "Common motifs in the response of cereal primary metabolism to fungal pathogens are not based on similar transcriptional reprogramming". Frontiers in Plant Science. 2. Frontiers Media SA: 39. doi:10.3389/fpls.2011.00039. ISSN 1664-462X. PMC 3355734. PMID 22645534.
- Doehlemann, Gunther; Reissmann, Stefanie; Aßmann, Daniela; Fleckenstein, Martin; Kahmann, Regine (22 June 2011). "Two linked genes encoding a secreted effector and a membrane protein are essential for Ustilago maydis-induced tumour formation". Molecular Microbiology. 81 (3). Wiley: 751–766. doi:10.1111/j.1365-2958.2011.07728.x. ISSN 0950-382X. PMID 21692877. S2CID 205369922.
- Wang, Lei; Berndt, Patrick; Xia, Xiaojuan; Kahnt, Jörg; Kahmann, Regine (4 August 2011). "A seven-WD40 protein related to human RACK1 regulates mating and virulence in Ustilago maydis". Molecular Microbiology. 81 (6). Wiley: 1484–1498. doi:10.1111/j.1365-2958.2011.07783.x. ISSN 0950-382X. PMID 21815950. S2CID 23599136.
