= AZ Electronic Materials =

- Company type: Subsidiary
- Industry: Chemicals
- Founded: c. 1950s
- Defunct: 2014
- Fate: Acquired
- Successor: Merck Group
- Headquarters: Luxembourg
- Key people: John Whybrow, Chairman; Geoff Wild, CEO
- Products: Diazo and other chemicals used in the manufacture electronics
- Parent: Merck KGaA
- Website: www.azem.com

AZ Electronic Materials was a Luxembourg specialty chemicals company that produced chemicals used in the manufacture electronics such as integrated circuits and flat panel displays. The company was acquired by Merck Group in 2014.

== History ==
The company was established in the 1950s as a division of Hoechst (now Sanofi). The name of the company is derived from the organic compound diazo.

In 1997 it was acquired by Clariant, a Swiss specialty chemicals business and in 2004 it was bought with funds controlled by the Carlyle Group. Vestar Capital Partners took a stake in the company in 2007.

In October 2010 it was first listed on the London Stock Exchange.

On 2 May 2014, Merck KGaA announced the successful acquisition of AZ Electronic Materials.

== Operations ==
The Company produces and sells specialty chemical materials used in the manufacture of integrated circuits and flat panel displays.
