= The RNAi Consortium =

American biotechnology consortium

The RNAi Consortium, or TRC, is a public-private partnership whose mission is to create libraries of small hairpin RNAs (shRNAs) for 15,000 human and 15,000 mouse genes. These libraries should help the scientific community to analyze gene function by RNAi. The consortium is based at the Broad Institute of the MIT and Harvard University, and includes 6 MIT- and Harvard-associated institutions and 5 international life sciences organizations. Verified RNAi clones and entire libraries are made available both by Sigma-Aldrich and Open Biosystems.

== Hairpin selection ==
A set of candidate hairpins are selected based on the first Refseq transcript from each NCBI gene. They should be 21mers, be at least 25bp from start of the coding sequence, and no closer than 150bp from its end. Candidates are scored based on various empirical rules (see the Broad Institute's web site for a complete list ) and then BLASTed against two transcriptome sets. Hairpins that are unique for a Unigene cluster and a RefSeq NM identifier are preferred. Lastly, the candidates are spaced to have one hairpin in the 3' untranslated region and four in the coding sequence.

== Hairpin vector ==
Selected hairpins are cloned into the vector pLKO1, which is a multipurpose plasmid that can be propagated in bacteria, transfected into mammalian cell lines, or used for generation of lentiviruses. It contains resistance genes against ampicillin and puromycin.

== Release ==
Release 1 of the TRC lentiviral shRNA libraries consist of about 35,000 shRNA constructs against 5300 human (25,000 clones) and 2200 mouse genes (10,000 clones). Release 2 of the human shRNA library contained an additional 9,500 clones. Releases occur roughly every quarter. The completing of both mouse and human libraries is envisioned for the end of 2006 or beginning of 2007.
