= Karl-Ludwig Kley =

German manager

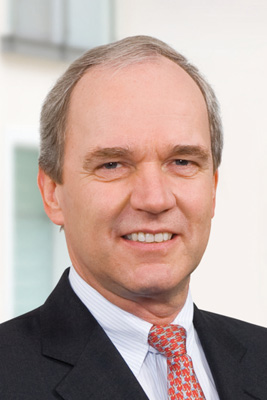
- Kley in 2010
- Born: 11 June 1951 (age 75); Munich, Bavaria, Germany
- Title: Chairman of Lufthansa
- Term: 2017–
- Successor: Stefan Oschmann

Karl-Ludwig Kley (born 11 June 1951 in Munich) is a German business executive.

== Education ==
Kley studied law at LMU Munich from 1974 to 1979. He completed his practical training as a lawyer in Hamburg and Johannesburg from 1979 to 1982. He earned a doctorate in law at LMU in 1986.

== Career ==
Kley worked for Bayer from 1982 to 1998, most recently as head of corporate finance and investor relations. He was chief financial officer and a member of the executive board of Lufthansa 1998–2006.

In 2006, Kley joined the Merck Group as a member of the executive board. He became chief executive officer (CEO) and chairman of the executive board of Merck KGaA in April 2007. Under his leadership, Merck strengthened its two non-pharmaceutical divisions, which make laboratory supplies and specialty chemicals, and completed a $17 billion deal to buy US laboratory supplies company Sigma-Aldrich. In his capacity at Merck, Kley was part of Chancellor Angela Merkel’s delegation on a state visit to Japan in 2015. Kley retired from The Merck Group in April 2016.

In 2017, Lufthansa named Kley as new chairman of its supervisory board, replacing Wolfgang Mayrhuber, who had resigned six months before the end of his term.

== Other activities (selection) ==
=== Corporate boards ===
- E.ON, Chairman of the Supervisory Board (since 2016)
- Lufthansa, Chairman of the Supervisory Board (2016–2025), Member of the Supervisory Board (2013–2025)
- Verizon Wireless, Member of the Board of Directors (since 2015)
- HSBC Trinkaus & Burkhardt, Member of the Advisory Board (since 2005)
- 1. FC Köln, Member of the Supervisory Board (since 2007)
- Deutsche Bank, Member of the European Advisory Board (since 2003)
- Rantum Capital, Chairman of the Advisory Board
- BMW, Vice Chairman of the Supervisory Board (2010–2021), Member of the Supervisory Board (2008–2021)
- Bertelsmann, Member of the Supervisory Board (2007–2016)
- MAN SE, Member of the Supervisory Board (2005–2007)

=== Non-profit organizations ===
- Baden-Badener Unternehmer-Gespräche (BBUG), Member of the Board
- Goethe Institute, Member of the Business and Industry Advisory Board
- University of Freiburg, Member of the Advisory Board
- Konrad Adenauer Prize, former Member of the Advisory Board
- Fritz Thyssen Foundation, Member of the Board of Trustees
- 1. FC Köln, Member of the Advisory Board (−2019)
- German Chemical Industry Association (VCI), President (2012–2014)

Business positions
Preceded by Michael Römer	Chief Executive Officer, Merck Group; 2007–2016	Succeeded by Stefan Oschmann
