= Versum Materials =

American corporation

Versum Materials, Inc.
- Type: Subsidiary of Merck Group
- Industry: Chemicals
- Founded: October 3, 2016; 9 years ago in Tempe, Arizona, United States
- Headquarters: Tempe, Arizona, U.S.
- Area served: Global
- Key people: Guillermo Novo, President, CEO & Director
- Products: Specialty materials for the semiconductor and display industries
- Number of employees: 2,200 (2017)
- Parent: Merck Group
- Website: www.versummaterials.com

Versum Materials, Inc. is an American company that manufactures chemical-mechanical planarization slurries, ultra-thin dielectric and metal precursors of film, formulated cleans and etching products, and delivery equipment for the semiconductor industry. It is a subsidiary of Merck Group.

== History ==
On October 3, 2016, Air Products & Chemicals completed the corporate spin-off of the company.

In 2017, the company acquired Dynaloy from Eastman Chemical Company for approximately $13 million to expand its Surface Prep and Cleans business.

In October 2019, Merck Group acquired the company.
