= Dannie Heineman Prize (Göttingen) =

The Dannie Heineman Prize of the Göttingen Academy of Sciences and Humanities has been awarded biennially since 1961 for excellent recently published publications in a new research field of current interest. It is awarded to younger researchers in natural sciences or mathematics. The prize is named after Dannie Heineman, a Belgian–US philanthropist, engineer and businessman with German roots.

== Prizewinners ==
- 1961 James Franck, biochemistry
- 1963 Edmund Hlawka, mathematics
- 1965 Georg Wittig, chemistry
- 1967 Martin Schwarzschild, astrophysics
- 1967 Gobind Khorana, biochemistry
- 1969 Brian Pippard, physics
- 1971 Neil Bartlett, chemistry
- 1973 Igor Schafarewitsch, mathematics
- 1975 Philip Warren Anderson, physics
- 1977 Albert Eschenmoser, chemistry
- 1979 Phillip Griffiths, mathematics
- 1981 Jacques Friedel, physics
- 1983 Gerd Faltings, mathematics
- 1986 Rudolf Thauer jr, biology
- 1987 Alex Müller and Georg Bednorz, physics
- 1989 Dieter Oesterhelt, biochemistry
- 1991 Jean-Pierre Demailly, mathematics
- 1993 Richard N. Zare, chemistry
- 1995 Donald M. Eigler, physics
- 1997 Regine Kahmann, biology
- 1999 Wolfgang Ketterle, physics
- 2001 Christopher C. Cummins, chemistry
- 2003 Michael Neuberger, biology
- 2005 Richard Taylor, mathematics
- 2007 Bertrand I. Halperin, physics
- 2009 Gerald F. Joyce, biology
- 2012 Krzysztof Matyjaszewski, chemistry
- 2013 Emmanuel Jean Candès, mathematics
- 2015 Andrea Cavalleri, physics
- 2018 André Gröschel, chemistry
- 2019 Oscar Randal-Williams, mathematics
- 2021 Viola Priesemann, physics
- 2024 Mayuko Yamashita, mathematical physics

== See also ==
- List of general science and technology awards
