= Kai Beckmann =

German business executive

- Kai Beckmann in 2025
- Born: 13 September 1965 (age 61); Hanau, Hesse, West Germany
- Education: Technical University of Darmstadt (MS, doctorate)
- Occupations: Chairman of the Executive Board, Merck KGaA
- Known for: Chairman of the Executive Board of Merck KGaA

Kai Beckmann (born 13 September 1965) is a German business executive and, since May 2026, Chairman of the Executive Board and Group CEO of the chemical and pharmaceutical company Merck KGaA. Beckmann has been a member of the Executive Board of Merck KGaA since 2011 and has led the Electronics business (until 2021: Performance Materials) since 2017.

== Education ==
Beckmann studied computer science at the Technical University of Darmstadt from 1984 to 1989 and completed a doctorate in economics in 1998.

== Career ==
=== At Merck ===
Beckmann began his professional career at Merck Group in 1989 as an IT systems consultant. From 1999 to 2004, he served as Head of Department for Information Management and Consulting, and from 2004 to 2007 as Managing Director of Merck's subsidiaries in Singapore and Malaysia. Between 2007 and 2011, he led the Corporate Information Services division as Merck's first CIO, during which time he introduced flexible working models and remote work options together with the works council. From 2011 to 2017, he served as Chief Administrative Officer.

Since 2011, Beckmann has been a member of the Executive Board of Merck KGaA and from 2017 served as CEO of the Electronics business (until 2021: Performance Materials). In October 2018, he assumed responsibility for the Darmstadt site and Merck's internal management consulting. He also acted as Germany Country Head with responsibility for co-determination matters.

In September 2025, Beckmann was appointed Deputy Chairman of the Executive Board of Merck with immediate effect and designated Chairman-elect. He formally assumed the role on 1 May 2026 as the successor to Belén Garijo.

=== Other positions and activities ===
From June 2017 to April 2024, Beckmann served as President of the Bundesarbeitgeberverband Chemie (BAVC), the German Chemical Employers' Association. From 2017 to 2025, he was also Vice President of the Confederation of German Employers' Associations (BDA). From 2016, he served as Member of the Supervisory Board of Bundesdruckerei, the German federal printing office, and chaired that board from 2023 until May 2026. He further holds positions as Chairman of the EU side of the EU-Japan Business Round Table (BRT), and as Member of the University Council of the Technical University of Darmstadt.

== Personal life ==
Beckmann is married and has a son.
