= Lotte Søgaard-Andersen =

Danish biologist

- Born: March 14, 1959 (age 66); Holbæk, Denmark
- Citizenship: Denmark
- Education: Odense University
- Scientific career
- Institutions: Odense University; Stanford University; University of Southern Denmark; Max Planck Institute for Terrestrial Microbiology; University of Marburg

Lotte Søgaard-Andersen (born March 14, 1959) is a Danish microbiologist and molecular geneticist who researches cell signaling and regulation of the cell cycle. She works at the Max Planck Institute for Terrestrial Microbiology as director and is an elected member of the German National Academy of Sciences Leopoldina and American Academy of Microbiology.

== Early life and education ==
Lotte Søgaard-Andersen was born on March 14, 1959, in Holbæk, Denmark. She graduated with her master's degree in 1984 from Odense University, followed by a Doctor of Medicine (1988) and PhD in molecular biology (1991) from the same university.

== Career ==
Søgaard-Andersen completed a postdoctoral research appointment at Odense University. She was hired as an assistant professor at Odense in 1992. In 1995, she was a visiting scientist at Stanford University. She worked as an associate professor at University of Southern Denmark from 1996 to 2001, at which point she was promoted to full professor. In 2004, she left the University of Southern Denmark to work as director and scientific member of the Max Planck Institute for Terrestrial Microbiology. In 2008 she began working at University of Marburg as a professor of microbiology.

She has been on the editorial boards of several journals, including the Annual Review of Microbiology, mBio, Current Opinion in Microbiology, PLOS Genetics, and Journal of Bacteriology.

== Awards and honors ==
In 2008 she was elected as a member of the German National Academy of Sciences Leopoldina in its microbiology and immunology section. In 2014 she became a member of the American Academy of Microbiology.
