= Mayuko Yamashita =

Japanese mathematician and mathematical physicist

Mayuko Yamashita (Japanese: 山下 真由子, born 1995) is a Japanese mathematician and mathematical physicist whose research combines the areas of algebraic topology, differential cohomology, and quantum field theory. She is an associate professor at Kyoto University.

== Education and career ==
Yamashita represented Japan in the 2013 International Mathematical Olympiad, earning a silver medal. She studied engineering at the University of Tokyo, earning a bachelor's degree in 2017. She earned a master's degree in mathematical sciences at the University of Tokyo in March 2019, and completed a Ph.D. there in 2022. Her dissertation, Differential models for the Anderson dual to bordism theories and invertible QFT's, was supervised by Yasuyuki Kawahigashi.

Meanwhile, in 2019, she became an assistant professor in the Research Institute for Mathematical Sciences of Kyoto University, while only 23 years old. She was promoted to associate professor in 2023 and joined the Perimeter Institute for Theoretical Physics in April 2025.

== Recognition ==
Yamashita was one of the recipients of the 2021 Takebe Katahiro Prize for Encouragement of Young Researchers of the Mathematical Society of Japan. She received the 2022 Grand Prize in the Marie Sklodowska Curie Awards of the Japan Science and Technology Agency "for her work on mathematical applications to particle physics". She was named in the Asian Scientist 100 list in 2023 and 2024. She was a 2024 recipient of the Maryam Mirzakhani New Frontiers Prize, associated with the Breakthrough Prize in Mathematics, "for contributions to mathematical physics and index theory". 2024 she was awarded the Dannie Heineman Prize (Göttingen) of the Göttingen Academy of Sciences and Humanities (today called Niedersächsische Akademie der Wissenschaften zu Göttingen) for her contribution to the precise description of anomalies in quantum field theories.
