= Rudolf K. Thauer =

German biologist (born 1939)

Rudolf K. Thauer (born October 5, 1939) is a biologist and a retired professor of microbiology and heads the Emeritus group at the Max Planck Institute for Terrestrial Microbiology in Marburg. Thauer taught in the faculty of Biology at the University of Marburg for about 15 years and is known primarily for his work on the biochemistry of methanogens.

He received the Gottfried Wilhelm Leibniz Prize by the Deutsche Forschungsgemeinschaft in 1986, among numerous other honours including honorary doctorates from ETH Zurich, University of Waterloo and the University of Freiberg. In 1991 he became founding director of the Max Planck Institute for Terrestrial Microbiology in Marburg.

A novel genus of betaproteobacteria was named Thauera in his honour. Methanobrevibacter thaueri was also named after Thauer.

He was elected to the American Philosophical Society in 2018.
