= Max Planck Institute for Terrestrial Microbiology =

Research institute in Marburg, Germany

Coordinates: 50°48′23″N 8°48′39″E

- Abbreviation: MPI-Marburg
- Formation: 1991; 35 years ago
- Type: Scientific institute
- Purpose: Research on terrestrial microorganisms
- Headquarters: Marburg, Hessen, Germany
- Key people: Rudolf K. Thauer, founder
- Parent organization: Max Planck Society
- Website: (in English)

The Max Planck Institute for Terrestrial Microbiology (MPI-TM, German: Max-Planck-Institut für terrestrische Mikrobiologie) is a research institute for terrestrial microbiology in Marburg, Germany. It was founded in 1991 by Rudolf K. Thauer and Ralf Conrad and is one of 80 institutes in the Max Planck Society (Max-Planck-Gesellschaft). Its sister institute is the Max Planck Institute for Marine Microbiology, which was founded a year later in 1992 in Bremen.

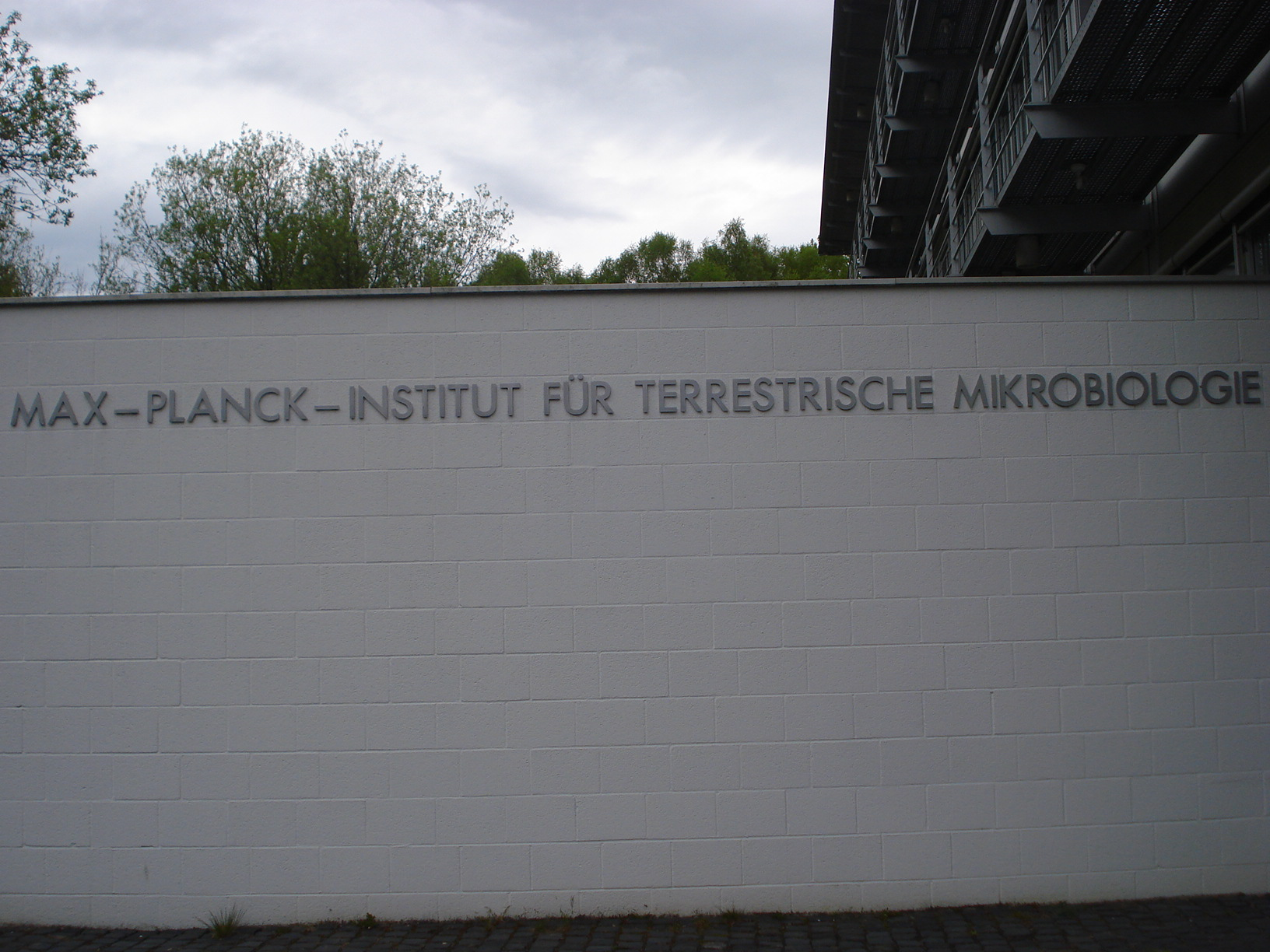
The Max Planck Institute for Terrestrial Microbiology, Marburg

== Research ==
There are currently around 19 research groups at the institute. The research at MPI-TM broadly focuses on understanding the functioning of microorganisms at the molecular, cellular and community levels. In particular, the focus is the mechanisms of cellular and community adaptation of bacteria in response to changes in the environment.

== Organization ==
Research at the institute is carried out in four departments with a total of six research groups. In addition the institute hosts three Max Planck Research Groups, one Emmy Noether Research Group, three department-independent research groups, two emerita and two emeriti, as well as two Max Planck Fellows.

The directors of the departments, Prof. Dr. Helge Bode (Department of Natural Products in Organismic Interactions), Prof. Dr. Victor Sourjik (Department of Systems and Synthetic Microbiology) and Prof. Dr. Tobias J. Erb (Department of Biochemistry and Synthetic Metabolism) are scientific members of the Max Planck Society. Managing Director 2024 - 2026 is Prof. Dr. Helge Bode.

=== Systems and Synthetic Microbiology ===
The Department of Systems and Synthetic Microbiology, headed by Victor Sourjik, aims to elucidate general principles of evolutionary optimization of cellular networks and implement these principles in the design of novel networks in microorganisms. Having a single research group, microbial networks is also led by Sourjik.

=== Biochemistry and Synthetic Metabolism ===
The Department of Synthetic Biochemistry and Metabolism is headed by Tobias J. Erb. Tobias Erb and his research group use synthetic biology approaches to study microbial carbon conversion and for the design and development of novel biocatalysts and biochemical processes for improved carbon capture.

=== Natural Products in Organismic Interactions ===
The Department of Natural Products in Organismic Interactions, headed by Helge B. Bode, works on microbial natural products as sources for bioactive drugs. He and his research group have developed new methods for manipulating nonribosomal peptide (NRPS) enzyme systems to produce natural products.

== Former Research and Emeritus Groups ==
=== Biochemistry of anaerobic microorganisms ===
The emeritus group "Biochemistry of anarobic microorganisms" at MPI-TM is headed by renowned biochemist and Gottfried Wilhelm Leibniz Prize recipient, Rudolf K. Thauer, who was also the founding director of the institute when it was established in 1991. The scientific focus of Rudolf Thauer is on the biochemistry of methanogenic archaea, methanotrophic archaea and saccharolytic clostridia. The following specific topics are being addressed:

- Hydrogen activation
- Methane formation and anaerobic methane oxidation
- Ferredoxin reduction

=== Molecular Phytopathology (former Department "Organismic Interactions") ===
The emeritus group "Molecular Phytopathology", headed by Regine Kahmann, is following her former department "Organismic Interactions" which focused on the biology of phytopathogenic fungi and in particular the mechanisms that underlie morphological differentiation and communication of these fungi with their plant hosts. It consisted of three research groups:

- Molecular phytopathology (Regine Kahmann)
- Establishment of compatibility in biotrophic interactions (Gunther Döhlemann)
- Functional genomics and molecular biology of symbiotic fungi (Alga Zuccaro)

=== Methanogenic Degradation and Microbial Metabolism of Trace Gases (former Department "Biogeochemistry") ===
The emeritus group "Methanogenic Degradation and Microbial Metabolism of Trace Gases", headed by Ralf Conrad, follows the former department "Biogeochemistry" that focused on the microbial metabolism and biogeochemical matter cycling in soil. Soil microbial metabolism plays an important role in the global cycling of matter and — through the formation of atmospheric trace gases such as methane and nitrous oxide — also influences the climate on Earth. The department examined the role of soil microorganisms in carbon and nitrogen cycling, particularly in chemically well-defined processes such as the production and consumption of methane, the oxidation of ammonia, or denitrification.

=== Ecophysiology ===
The Ecophysiology Department, headed by Lotte Søgaard-Andersen, focuses on understanding how intracellular signalling networks are wired to allow bacteria to adapt and differentiate in response to changes in the environment or in response to self-generated signals. Specifically, the department has two aims. Firstly, they aim to understand how bacteria process information to generate appropriate output responses (e.g. changes in gene expression, changes in motility behavior). Secondly, they aim to understand how molecular machines involved in motility and secretion function and how their activity is regulated. Ecophysiology currently has two research groups led by the following in parentheses:

- Bacterial secretion systems (Andreas Diepold)
- Bacterial development & differentiation (Lotte Søgaard-Andersen)

== Collaborations ==
=== SYNMIKRO ===
Together with the University of Marburg, MPI-TM operates the SYNMIKRO Center for Synthetic Microbiology. The inter-institutional research center, was founded in 2010 through the LOEWE excellence program of the State of Hesse and made permanent in 2019. As of 2021 the research center moved into a new research lab building on the Lahnberge campus just beside MPI-TM.

=== IMPRS-Mic ===
The Max Planck Institute for Terrestrial Microbiology operates the International Max Planck Research School for Environmental, Cellular and Molecular Microbiology program, in collaboration with the Philipps University of Marburg. The degrees are conferred by the university, as is the case for all other IMPRS programs in the MPG. Apart from the university, the MPI has close collaborations with research centres in the city and overseas. More specific information on the program can be found on their cooperations page.
