= Merck Group =

German multinational science and technology company

Merck KGaA
- Logo since 2015

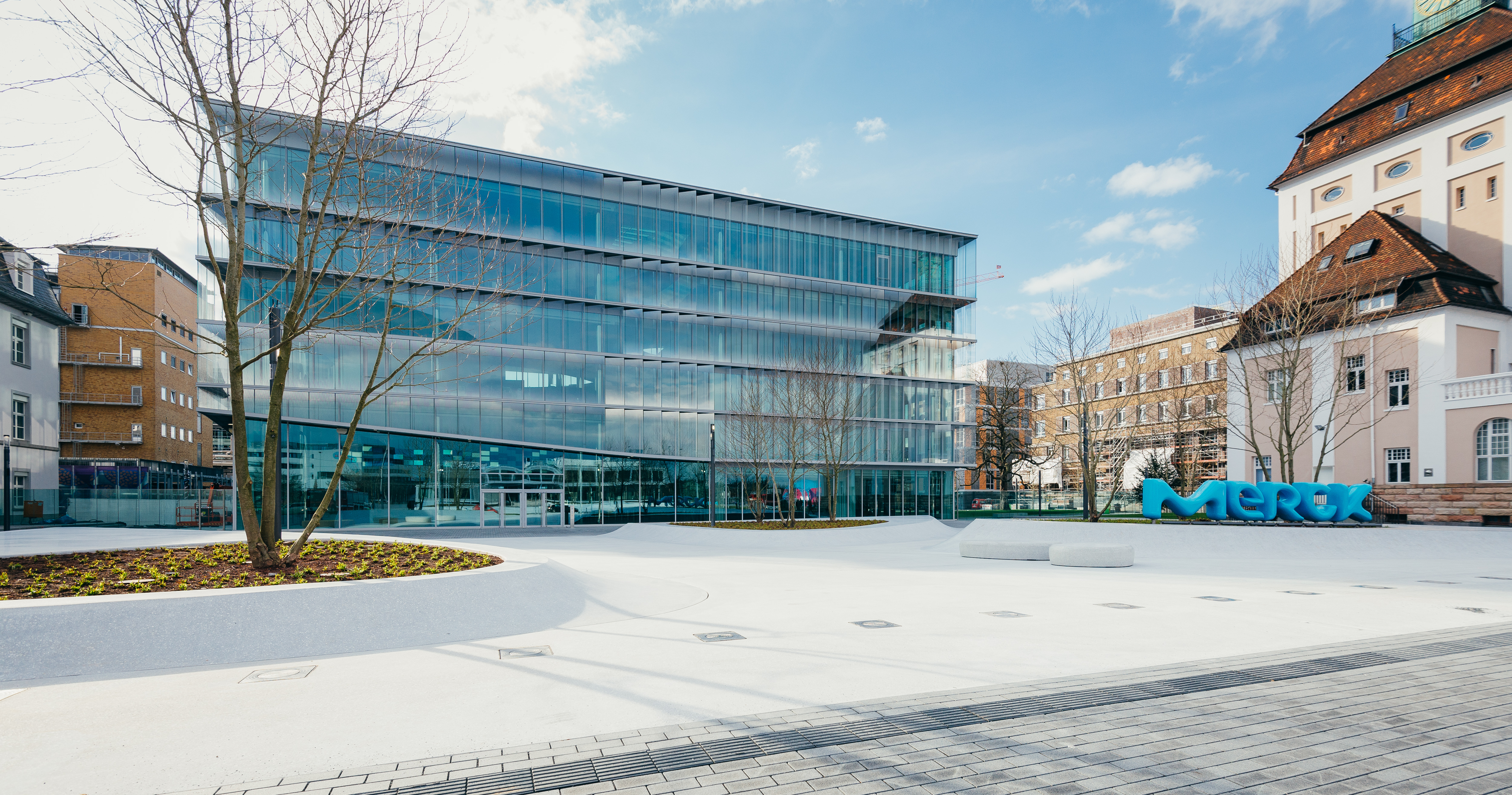
- Headquarters in Darmstadt, Germany
- Type: Public company
- Traded as: FWB: MRK; FWB: MRKC; DAX component (MRK)
- Industry: Chemicals; Pharmaceuticals
- Founded: 1668; 358 years ago
- Founder: Friedrich Jacob Merck
- Headquarters: Darmstadt, Germany
- Area served: Worldwide
- Key people: Kai Beckmann (CEO and chairman of the executive board); Helene von Roeder (CFO and member of the executive board); Michael Kleinemeier (chairman of the supervisory board)
- Products: Liquid crystals, life science and performance chemicals, Bioprocessing-Solutions, small molecules and biopharmaceuticals
- Revenue: ▼€21.10 billion (2025)
- Operating income: ▼€3.601 billion (2025)
- Net income: ▼€2.615 billion (2025)
- Total assets: ▼€51.53 billion (2025)
- Total equity: ▼€28.66 billion (2025)
- Owner: E. Merck KG (70.3% of capital); Select Equity group LP (3%); Sun Life Financial (3.5%)
- Number of employees: 62,461 (2025)
- Website: merckgroup.com

The Merck Group, branded and commonly known as Merck, is a German multinational science and technology company headquartered in Darmstadt, with about 60,000 employees and a presence in 66 countries. The group includes around 250 companies; the main company is Merck KGaA in Germany. The company is divided into three business lines: Healthcare, Life Sciences and Electronics. Merck was founded in 1668 and is the world's oldest operating chemical and pharmaceutical company, as well as one of the largest pharmaceutical companies globally.

Merck operates in Europe, Africa, Asia, Oceania and the Americas. It has major research and development centres in Darmstadt, Boston, Shizuoka and Beijing, as well as other Research and Development units in Taiwan, France, Israel, South Korea, India, and the UK. Merck pioneered the commercial manufacture of morphine in the 19th century and for a time held a virtual monopoly on cocaine.

Merck was privately owned until going public on the Frankfurt Stock Exchange in 1995 and is listed on the DAX index of Germany's top companies. The Merck family still controls a majority of 70.3% of the company's shares. The Merck Group includes around 250 companies in 180 countries; the current main parent company of the group, since 1995, is named Merck KGaA, and is itself mainly owned by the former main parent company, E. Merck oHG, which now operates as a holding company.

The American pharmaceutical company Merck & Co. was established as a subsidiary of Merck in 1891, but was nationalized by the United States in 1917, before being privatized again when George W. Merck, a member of an American branch of the Merck family, repurchased the stock in 1919. It is known as MSD (Merck Sharp and Dohme) outside of North America. Merck KGaA of Darmstadt holds the rights to the name Merck in all countries except the U.S. and Canada, where its businesses operate under "EMD Serono" in Healthcare, "MilliporeSigma" in Life Science and "EMD Electronics" in Electronics. Merck & Co., Inc. holds the rights in the trademark MERCK in the United States and Canada.

In 2018, the company celebrated their 350th anniversary. Merck has formed a strategic alliance with the Technische Universität Darmstadt, which is located in the same town as Merck.

== History ==
=== Origins and early activity ===
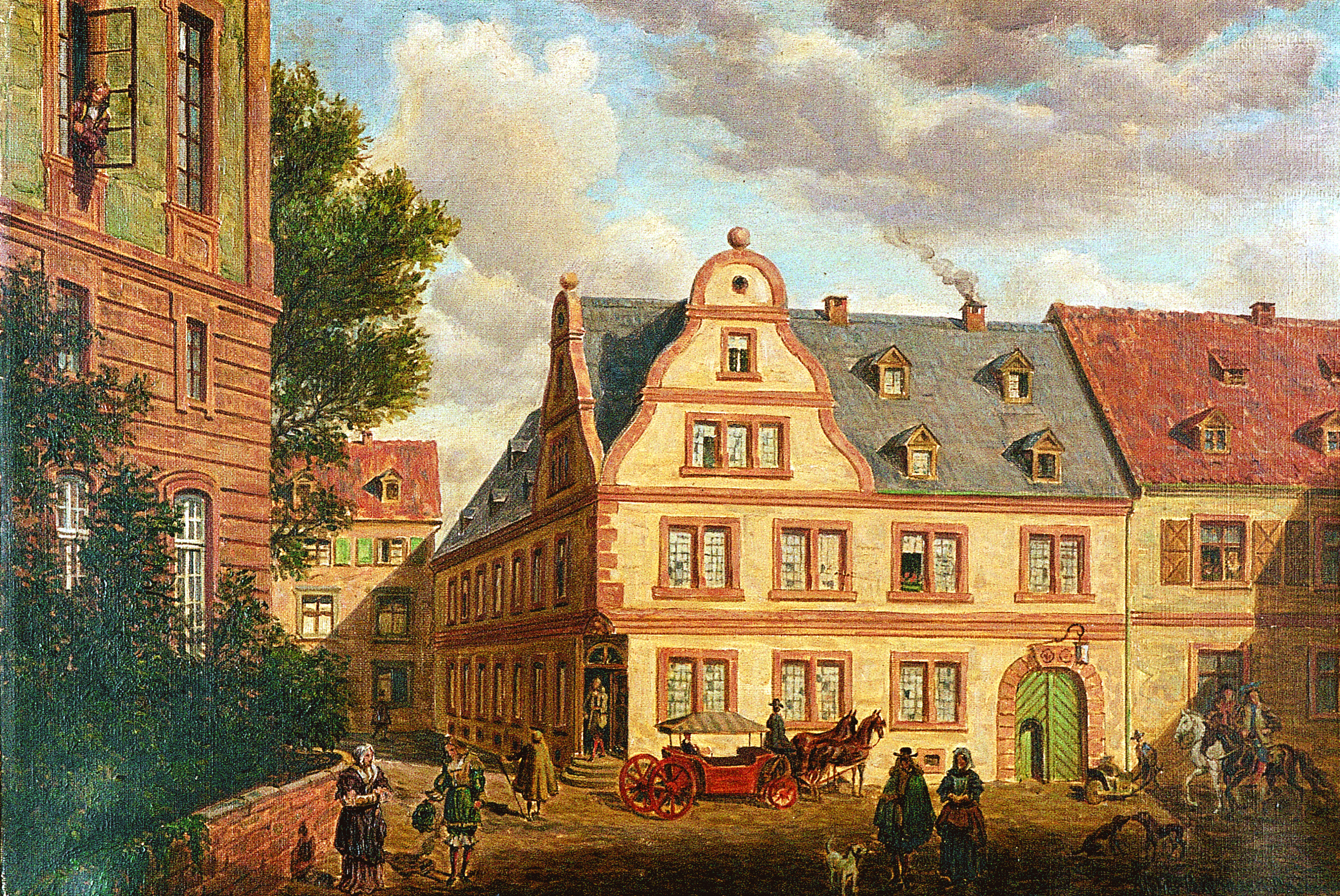
The Angel Pharmacy in Darmstadt which was owned by the Merck family from 1668; the beginning of the Merck company

The roots of Merck reach back as far as the 17th century in the Landgraviate of Hesse-Darmstadt (now a part of Germany). In 1668, Friedrich Jacob Merck, an apothecary, assumed ownership of the Engel-Apotheke (lit. 'Angel Pharmacy') in Darmstadt. Following Friedrich’s death, other family members continued to run the business, which steadily grew over the following century.

In 1816, Emanuel Merck, a descendant of the original founder, took over the pharmacy. Thanks to his scientific education he was successful in isolating and characterizing several different alkaloids in the pharmacy's laboratory, and by doing so also invented a number of drugs. He began the manufacture of these substances "in bulk" in 1827, touting them as a "Cabinet of Pharmaceutical and Chemical Innovations". He and his successors gradually built up a chemical-pharmaceutical factory that produced — in addition to raw materials for pharmaceutical preparations — a multitude of other chemicals and (from 1890) medicines. By 1860, Merck was manufacturing in excess of 800 distinct substances.

In 1895, Merck set up a department of bacteriology, which led to the company producing vaccinations for smallpox as well as screening tests for both tuberculosis and typhus. By the end of the nineteenth century, Merck was amongst the largest suppliers of cocaine in the world.

Throughout the 19th century, the company spread globally. In 1891, Georg(e) Merck established himself in the United States and set up Merck & Co. with Theodore Weicker in New York.

=== 1900 to 1933 ===
During the First World War, Merck lost control of its overseas subsidiaries. The US-based Merck & Co. was confiscated by the US government under the Trading with the Enemy Act of 1917, after which it was operated as an independent company. In 1919, George Merck, along with several business partners, won an auction to repurchase Merck & Co.; while owned by the same family once again, the two entities have remained separate.

The US company, which operates as Merck Sharp and Dohme (MSD) outside the U.S. and Canada, had about 68,000 employees across 120 countries by December 2021. It is one of the top five pharmaceutical companies worldwide, larger than its German progenitor, which employs 60,334 people in 67 countries by December 2021. While Merck in Darmstadt is the legal successor of the original Merck and retains the rights to the name "Merck" in all countries except the U.S. and Canada, it is sometimes known as the "German Merck" or "Merck Darmstadt" in North America. The company was formerly also referred to as "E. Merck" (Emanuel Merck.

In 1927, the first standardized vitamin D product was co-launched by Merck and Bayer AG; it produced its first vitamin C product (branded as Cebion) in 1934.

=== 1933 to 1945: Nazi era ===
In the years of the Nazi rule, the company was led by Karl Emanuel Merck who became a member of the Nazi Party in 1933 and subsequently received the title of Wehrwirtschaftsführer. In addition, Merck was president of the Hessian Chamber of Commerce and Industry as well as performing an advisory function in the Expert Advisory Council for National Health ("Sachverständigenrat für Volksgesundheit") of the Nazi Party. The company purged employees of Jewish heritage during this time. During World War II, Merck was manufacturing war essential products such as narcotics, vitamins, biocides and other chemicals. According to the company's account, 265 forced laborers were working in the plant in Darmstadt, most of them women from Russia and Poland. Additionally, several hundred Fremdarbeiter ("foreign workers") from France and Belgium were employed throughout the war years. An air raid on 12 December 1944 destroyed nearly 70 percent of the plant and killed 55 employees.

=== 1945 to 1999 ===
In September 1945, the company's assets were confiscated, management figures removed and ownership temporarily reassigned. Three years later, the Merck family returned to the business, after which sizable loans were taken out to finance its recovering and expansion. In 1952, the firm started exporting its products by aircraft to Japan. It was also able to reacquire several of its lost subsidiary companies, such as those in Spain and South America.

Another move taken in this era was the purchase of licenses for a microbiological process, permitting the production of both prednisone and prednisolone. The company invested considerable sums into R&D during the early Cold War period. Between 1959 and 1970, 34 separate patents relating to biotechnology were granted to Merck in Germany.

In 1973, Merck Ltd. acquired BDH Chemicals from the Glaxo Group.

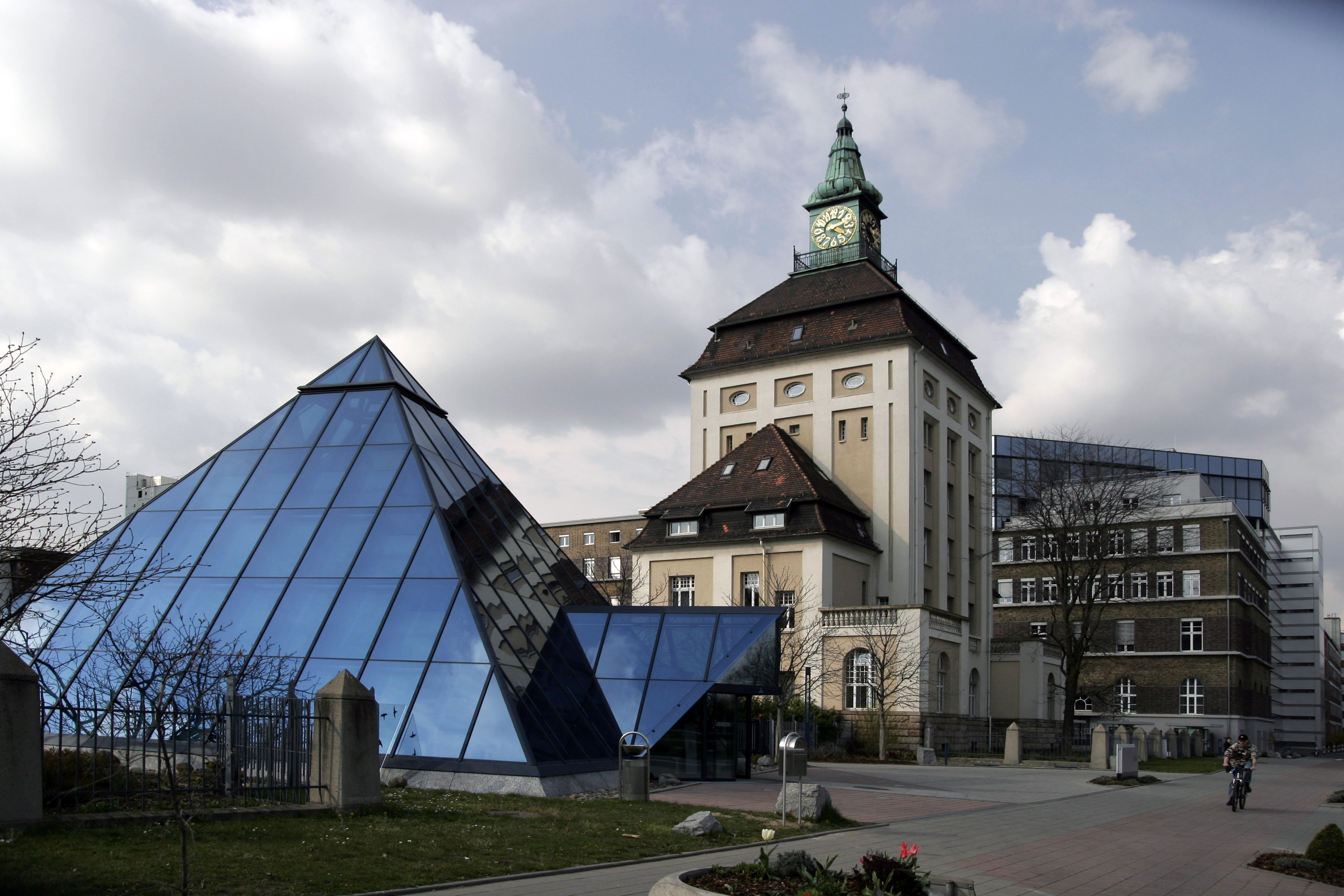
Merck visitor centre in Darmstadt, which stood from the early 1980s to around 2015

In the early 1980s, Merck Group built a visitor center at its Darmstadt headquarters that featured a pyramid. This pyramid remained in place until 2014, when it was demolished as part of a wider redevelopment of the Darmstadt site.

Merck was legally named E. Merck oHG until 1995. That year, it was listed on the Frankfurt Stock Exchange and became a KGaA, legally named Merck KGaA. At the time, it was the largest floatation in German history. During the late 1990s, the company's new shareholders quickly became disatisfied with its management team's traditional discreet and low-risk decision making. In 1999, Bernhard Scheuble was appointed as the company's next CEO, becoming the first non-family member to hold this position; shortly thereafter, the company introduced stock options and improved its financial reporting.

=== 2000 to 2009 ===
In the early 2000s, the NHS alleged that various drugs companies had exploited the oligopolistic market conditions to force the NHS to pay inflated prices. NHS fraud investigators believe there was a conspiracy to limit the supply of 30 of its most commonly prescribed drugs, including a class of penicillin antibiotics and to a generic version of best-selling ulcer treatment Zantac. The NHS has so far filed claims in relation to just three drugs, seeking damages of more than £150m, while the Serious Fraud Office (SFO) is conducting a parallel investigation into the price-fixing allegations limited to the supply of blood-thinning pill warfarin and penicillin-based antibiotics. Homes and offices of executives at six firms, including Ranbaxy, Generics UK, Norton Healthcare, Goldshield and Regent-GM were raided by the SFO in May 2002. In June 2005, Generics UK (Merck's former British subsidiary, the global Generics business being sold on 2 October 2007) paid a £12M out-of-court settlement with the Department of Health and Social Care of the UK over involvement in an alleged price and supply fixing cartel.

On 13 March 2006, Merck announced a takeover bid for Schering AG, the world's largest producer of oral contraceptives. On 23 March 2006, Bayer AG made a supported offer for Schering and Merck decided to drop out of the bidding for the company. Schering is not to be confused with Schering-Plough which was once part of Schering AG but was acquired by Merck & Co. in 2009. In September 2006 the company announced a takeover bid of $13.2 billion for Serono SA, Switzerland's largest biotech firm. The deal included a buy-out of the Bertarelli family's 64.5% stake in Serono to be followed by a public tender offer for the remaining shares starting in November 2006. The combined company has an R&D budget of approximately $1.1 billion and sales of approximately $4.6 billion. Its approximately $2 billion in sales of biologics would make it seventh among pharmaceutical/biotech companies. The new entity, Merck Serono, began operations in 2007.

Merck KGaA established its philanthropic foundation in 2008 called Merck Foundation. Rasha Kelej currently serves as its CEO.

=== 2010 to 2019 ===
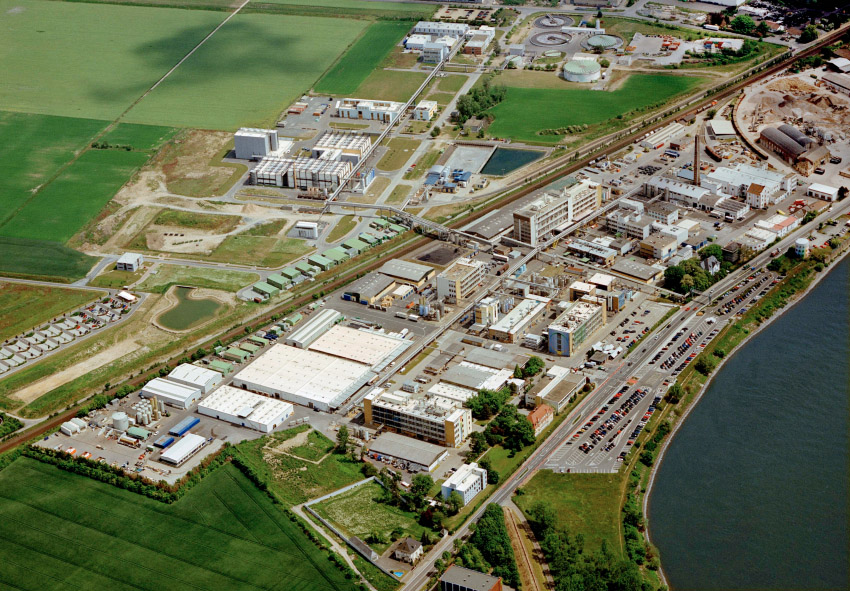
Merck chemical production plant in Gernsheim

In 2010, Merck took over Billerica (MA) based Millipore Corporation for EUR 5.3 billion (US$7.2 billion). It has become Merck's life science business unit. Through the acquisition of Millipore, Merck proceeded to consolidate its US holdings, which included shutting down the Gibbstown facility and warehouse, and transferring operations from that location to either its Philadelphia office and Millipore headquarters.

Merck Korea received the "Leading Investor Award" at the 5th Korea-EU Industrial Cooperation Day in 2011.

In December 2013, the company bought AZ Electronic Materials SA (AZEM) for about $2.6 billion in cash to increase its offering of specialty chemicals to the electronics industry.

In September 2014, Merck halted the clinical development of two drug candidates in development with Oxygen Biotherapeutics. One drug candidate suffered a lack of success in patient recruitment, with its MUC1 antigen-specific cancer immunotherapy drug, tecemotide (L-BLP25), missing its Phase I/II endpoint of increasing overall survival in patients with Stage III non-small cell lung cancer. Later that same month, it was announced that the company would acquire Sigma-Aldrich in exchange for $17 billion. After the acquisition was completed in 2015, Merck had around 50,000 employees. In November 2014, Merck and Pfizer agreed a deal for the latter to sell the former sharing rights to develop an experimental immunotherapy drug for a fee of $850 million.

In October 2015, Merck revealed it would return the rights of the Kuvan drug to BioMarin Pharmaceutical Inc. The drug is effective in the treatment of the rare genetic disorder PKU, however Merck is moving away from genetics into cancer treatment, immunology and neurology. In October, it was announced that Karl-Ludwig Kley, CEO of Merck since April 2007, would retire in April 2016, and be succeeded by Stefan Oschmann, who has been a member of the executive board since 2011. The company started building new facilities for its R&D operations and a new visitor center at its Darmstadt site in the early 2010s. By 2015 the site's pyramid had been torn down as part of the renovations.

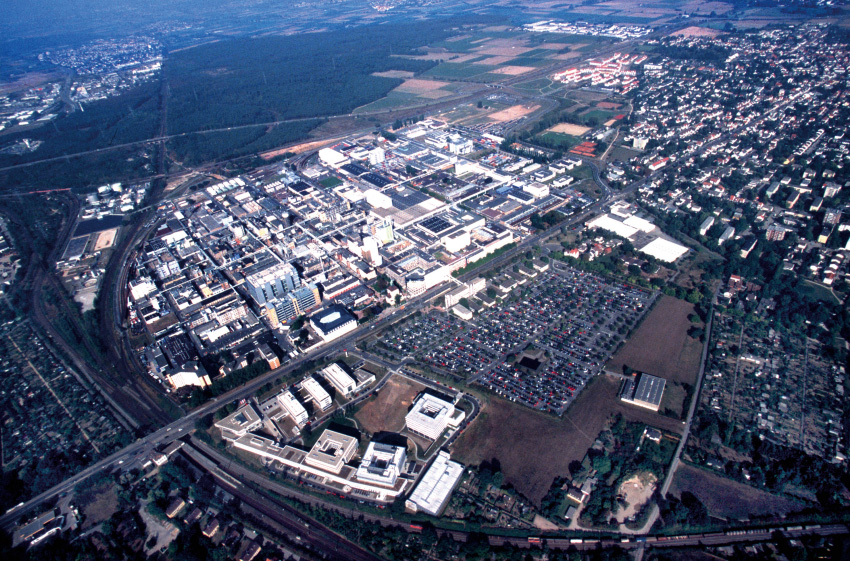
Merck headquarters in Darmstadt

In April 2017, the company announced it had completed the acquisition of food safety testing company, BioControl Systems Inc. In August of the same year the company announced the acquisition of Natrix Separations for an undisclosed sum.

In September 2017, Merck said it is considering options for its consumer-health division, including a potential full or partial sale, or strategic partnership. An equity analyst estimated the unit could command a purchase price of €1.8 billion to €2.7 billion from a full sale. In December, Reuters reported that both Nestlé and private equity owners of Stada were preparing bids for Merck's consumer health group. Days later, Reuters again reported that Perrigo was also preparing a bid for the division in the region of €4 billion ($4.7 billion to $4.8 billion). In April 2018, Reuters reported that generic drug manufacturer, Mylan was in advanced discussions to acquire the consumer health business for between €3.5–4 billion (£3–3.4 billion). Later in the month, Reuters reported that Procter & Gamble would purchase the division for €3.4 billion euros (£2.96 billion; $4.2 billion).

In April 2019, Merck announced it would acquire Versum Materials. The acquisition was completed in October 2019 and represented an equity value of about U$5.8 billion. In the same year, Merck has also announced the acquisition of Intermolecular Inc, the California-based company for advanced materials. The acquisition was completed in September 2019 and represented an equity value of U$62 million.

=== 2020 onwards ===
In February 2020, Merck announced the divestment of its Allergopharma Business to Dermapharm, under an unspecified fee. The deal includes Merck's Portfolio in Europe and parts of Asia, including China and India.

In January 2021, MilliporeSigma announced it would acquire AmpTec to expand and enhance the businesses mRNA vaccine capabilities as well as its treatment and diagnostics offerings. In March, its Performance Materials division changed name to Electronics division. In December of the same year, Merck KGaA announced it would acquire Swiss-based Chord Therapeutics and its lead drug cladribine, used in generalised myasthenia gravis and neuromyelitis optica spectrum disorder.

In December 2025, the company opened a large facility to support the semiconductor industry in Kaohsiung.

=== Name ===
Seventh and former logo of Merck KGaA used from 1 October 2001 until 13 October 2015. This form was used internationally; in U.S. and Canada its design was similar but reading "EMD" instead of "Merck".

Merck in Darmstadt is the sole legal successor of the original Merck and retains the rights to the trademark "Merck" in all countries except the U.S. and Canada, where "EMD" brand is mostly used (it was introduced alongside Merck's 2001 logo). In recent branding campaigns, the company has referred to itself as "the original Merck" and "the real Merck". The company was legally known as E. Merck oHG until 1995, when Merck KGaA became the main parent company and the former a holding company.

In 2024, the media reported on how protesters were still confusing the US and German Mercks.

In 2015, Merck adopted a new logo to increase the visual differences between both companies, while also visualizing "vibrant science and technology" as the new company's brand. It has initiated litigation in several countries against its former subsidiary Merck & Co. (MSD) over infringing use of the Merck name. In 2016, the High Court of Justice in the United Kingdom ruled that MSD had breached an agreement with its former parent company and that only Merck of Darmstadt is entitled to use the Merck name in the United Kingdom; the judge also held that MSD's use of "Merck" as part of branding on its global websites were directed to the UK and infringed Merck's trade mark rights in the UK. In response, MSD has initiated counter-litigation in the United States.

After those controversies, Merck also adopted a new logo for EMD. The same look was also given to the logos of EMD Serono, MilliporeSigma, and EMD Performance Materials (renamed EMD Electronics in March 2021) divisions. Its corporate website is merckgroup.com in the world excluding U.S. and Canada, displaying its normal Merck logo in the header, and emdgroup.com in U.S. and Canada, displaying use of its corporate name, Merck KGaA, Darmstadt, Germany, in the header and additionally displaying a disclaimer about trademark ownership in the footer.

On 7 December 2021, Merck, which uses the name EMD Electronics for its North American electronics business, announced they would be investing $1 billion in a U.S. operations joint venture with Palantir Technologies to assist in solving some of the chip industry's supply chain problems. The plan is for sites in Pennsylvania, Texas, California, and Arizona.

=== Acquisition history ===
The following is an illustration of the company's mergers, acquisitions, spin-offs and historical predecessors:

- Merck Group
  - MilliporeSigma
    - Merck Millipore
      - Merck Serono
        - Merck (Founded 1668 by Jacob Friedrich Merck)
        - Serono (Acq 2006)
      - Millipore Corporation (Acq 2010)
        - Waters Associates Inc (Acq 1979)
        - Waters Chromatography Division (Sold 1994)
        - Amicon Separation Sciences (Acq 1996)
        - Tylan General (Acq 1997)
        - Bioprocessing Ltd (Acq 1999)
        - Microelectronics Division (Spun off 2001 as Mykrolis)
        - MicroSafe (Acq 2005)
        - NovAseptic (Acq 2005)
        - Newport Bio Systems (Acq 2006)
        - Serologicals Corporation (Acq 2006)
        - Guava Technologies (Acq 2009)
        - BioAnaLab (Acq 2009)
      - AZ Electronic Materials (Acq 2013)
    - Sigma-Aldrich (Acq 2014)
      - Sigma-Aldrich Corporation
        - Aldrich Chemical Co. (Merged 1975)
        - Sigma International Ltd (Merged 1975)
      - Ultrafine (Acq 2004)
      - JRH Biosciences (Acq 2005)
      - Proligo Group (Acq 2005)
      - Beijing Superior Chemicals and Instruments Co (Acq 2006)
      - Iropharm (Acq 2006)
      - Pharmorphix Ltd (Acq 2006)
      - Advanced Separation Technologies (Acq 2006)
      - Epichem Group Ltd (Acq 2007)
      - Molecular Medicine BioServices (Acq 2007)
      - BioReliance (Acq 2012)
    - BioControl Systems Inc. (Acq 2017)
    - Natrix Separations (Acq 2017)
    - AmpTec (Acq 2021)
    - Erbi Biosystems (Acq 2022)
    - Mirus Bio (Acq 2024)
  - Versum Materials (Acq 2019)
    - Dynaloy (Acq 2017)
  - Intermolecular Inc (Acq 2019)
  - Chord Therapeutics (Acq 2021)

== Controversies ==
Merck KGaA has faced criticism for continuing its business operations in Russia following the country's invasion of Ukraine. Despite international sanctions and pressure on companies to exit the Russian market, Merck KGaA has maintained its presence, citing commitments to supplying essential medicines. This decision has sparked backlash from activists and organizations advocating for corporate responsibility in geopolitical conflicts.

== Healthcare ==
After Wilhelm Adam Sertürner's isolation of morphine from opium in 1805, Merck pioneered (from 1827) the commercial manufacture of morphine for an expanding global market. From 1884 onwards, Merck also played role in the production and marketing of cocaine. Sigmund Freud, author of Über Coca (1884), was an enthusiastic collaborator in Merck's cocaine research, though the methodological sophistication of his self-experimentation studies has been challenged. Attention was directed at vitamins as a new product category, and Vigantol was introduced in 1927, followed by Cebion in 1934.

Following the defeat of Germany in World War II, Merck was granted permission by the military government to produce drugs, pesticides, food preservatives, reagents, and fine chemicals for laboratory use. Soon afterward the boom that is commonly known as the "Wirtschaftswunder" (economic miracle) set in. For Merck, this meant two-digit sales-growth figures for many years. Products of this time included corticoid preparations — for example Fortecortin, which is still used today — the cold remedy Nasivin or the hormone preparation Gestafortin.

Merck currently employs over 2,500 people in its 4 R&D hubs via. Boston, Darmstadt, Beijing and Tokyo. In the year 2018, Merck invested over €1,6 billion in its R&D operations. The focus of Merck's current pharmaceutical R&D is on oncology, neurology and immunology. In oncology, its first marketed product is Erbitux (cetuximab), for which it has marketing rights worldwide, apart from North America. (Cetuximab was discovered by Imclone Systems, and is marketed in North America by Bristol-Myers Squibb.) Other areas of Expertise from Merck Healthcare include Fertility, Endocrinology and General Medicine, the later focusing on treatments for Diabetes, Thyroid disease and Cardiovascular diseases. Some products from Merck include Metformin, Bisoprolol, Levothyroxine and Digitoxin. Merck's clinical research strategy consists of a partnership with Quintiles in which the latter helps the former in the clinical development of all its compounds. In February 2019, Merck also announced a partnership with GSK to develop and commercialize M7824 (bintrafusp alfa*), a new Immunotherapy with potential in various difficult-to-treat cancers. In 2020, Merck launched partnership with Pechoin in China to develop "high-tech herbal" skincare products. In the U.S. and Canada, the healthcare business of Merck operates as “EMD Serono”.

== Life science ==
The life science business of Merck, formerly known as Merck Millipore, was created in July 2010 following the completed acquisition of the US company Millipore. This division comprised all Millipore activities and major segments of the former Merck division Performance & Life Science Chemicals.

In 2015, Merck acquired Sigma-Aldrich and combined it with Merck Millipore. The company was branded Merck globally and MilliporeSigma in the United States and Canada The science business of Merck/MilliporeSigma has 300,000 products and three business units: Life Science Services, Science & Lab Solutions, and Process Solutions. The Life Science Services include the Contract Development and Manufacturing Organization (CDMO) and contract testing services. Science & Lab Solutions includes products for Laboratories and Quality Control organizations. Process Solutions supports the biopharma manufacturing processes of its clients with single-use products. The company has products organized under the brands Sigma-Aldrich, Millipore, SAFC, Supelco, Milli-Q, and Bioreliance. The company serves customers in biotech, pharma, diagnostics, food safety, academia, and environmental. Jean-Charles Wirth is the CEO of the life science business of Merck.

The Life Science business sponsors several award programs for graduate students. One of these awards, the Alfred R. Bader Award for Student Innovation recognizes advanced chemistry graduate students, typically in the field of synthetic organic chemistry.

== Electronics ==
Merck's electronics business consists of semiconductor solutions and surface solutions, referring to pigments and cosmetics. In the U.S. and Canada, the electronics business of Merck operates as “EMD Electronics”.

=== Semiconductors ===
Semiconductor Solutions is the largest business unit within Merck's Electronics business sector. It provides materials, delivery systems, and services for the semiconductor industry. The business unit supplies products for every major production step in the wafer processing, including doping, lithography, patterning, deposition, planarization, etching, and cleaning. After the acquisition of Intermolecular, its capabilities allow material combinations to be tested directly in the specific application environment accelerating learning cycles. Since the acquisition of Versum and Intermolecular, inc., the company's portfolio in electronic materials was significantly expanded. The launch of the integrated organization was done on 1 June 2020.

=== Pigments and cosmetics ===
Merck started working on effect pigments in 1957. The business unit is called Surface Solutions. The core markets for Surface Solutions are automotive coatings, cosmetics, and, to a smaller extent, industrials. An example of its pigments is alumina effect pigments sold under the brand name Xirallic. Currently, this business unit pools all activities for pigments in lacquering, printing, and plastic applications, in the field of security technology (for instance counterfeiting protection), pigments for applications in the food and pharmaceutical areas, functional materials, and active substances and pigments for cosmetics.

== M Ventures ==
M Ventures is a venture capital fund of Merck. In 2021, the funds available for investment were increased by EUR 600M to enable investments Biotechnology and Technology.

== Awards ==
=== Emanuel Merck Lectureship Award ===
The award was jointly established by Merck and the Technische Universität Darmstadt in 1992. It recognizes scientists who have made contributions to chemical and pharmaceutical research.

=== Heinrich Emanuel Merck Award ===
The award was established in 1988 to recognize novel methods in analytical chemistry. Since 2025, the scope of the award has been broadened to encompass innovation in the computational sciences.

=== Future Insight Prize ===
During the company's 350th anniversary in 2018, Merck announced the Future Insight Prize. The prize consists of a research grant of €1,000,000 every year through the next 35 years, to motivate innovation in areas that could solve humanity's most pressing issues.
