= Jon A. Wolff =

American geneticist (1956–2020)

Jon Asher Wolff (September 25, 1956 – April 17, 2020) was an American geneticist. He was the lead author on a 1990 study published in the journal Science that first suggested the possibility of synthesizing mRNA in a laboratory to trigger the production of a desired protein. As of 2021, the article has been cited in the scholarly press more than 630 times and been described, by Nature, as "the first step toward making a vaccine from mRNA".

Wolff was born in Bayside, Queens, New York, in 1956, received his undergraduate education at Cornell University and earned an MD from Johns Hopkins University. He was a professor of medicine at the University of Wisconsin and later founder of the biotechnology firm Mirus Bio. He died in Denver, Colorado, from esophageal cancer at age 63.
