= Merck Millipore =

Deprecated brand name used by Merck Group after Millipore acquisition

Coordinates: 42°32′18.3″N 71°16′59.8″W

MilliporeSigma
- Type: Private
- Industry: Life sciences Biotech
- Headquarters: Burlington, Massachusetts, United States
- Key people: Matthias Heinzel (CEO)
- Products: Filtration; Pharmaceutical equipment and consumables Chemistry; Biotechnology
- Revenue: EUR€ 6.86 billion (2020)
- Number of employees: More than 22,000

Merck Millipore was the brand used by Merck Group's (not US-based Merck & Co.) global life science business until 2015 when the company re-branded. It was formed when Merck acquired the Millipore Corporation in 2010. Merck is a supplier to the life science industry. The Millipore Corporation was founded in 1954, and listed among the S&P 500 since the early 1990s, as an international biosciences company which makes micrometer pore-size filters and tests. In 2015, Merck acquired Sigma-Aldrich and merged it with Merck Millipore. In the United States and Canada, the life science business is now known as MilliporeSigma.

== History ==
=== Founding ===
In the early 1950s, Lovell Corporation won a contract from the U.S. Army Chemical Engineers to develop and manufacture membrane filtering devices used to separate the molecular components of fluid samples. When the membranes were declassified in 1953 and offered for commercial use, Jack Bush, son of Vannevar Bush and a Lovell employee, bought the company's technology for $200,000 and established the Millipore Filter Company. Bush coined the word millipore to refer to the numerous tiny openings in the microporous membrane product. The term "millipore", originally a trademark, has since come into generic use, referring to any of several filters, made from cellulose acetate membranes, capable of removing very small particles. Later the company changed its name to Millipore Corporation to reflect its growing range of products. In 2010, Merck KGaA the world's oldest chemical and pharmaceutical company, acquired Millipore Corporation to form EMD Millipore.

=== Filters ===
By 1959, Millipore made porous membrane filters of cellulose esters or other materials which resembled paper in sheet form, and were brittle when dry but friable when wet. Filters consisted of nitrocellulose or polycarbonate membrane nucleopore filters ranging from pore size of 0.2 μm (micrometer) to 20 μm. Modern filters are polyvinylidene fluoride and/or polypropylene based.

=== Growth ===
By 1970, Millipore had established subsidiaries in seven countries. The company opened manufacturing plants in Jaffrey, New Hampshire; Molsheim, France; County Cork, Ireland; and other locations. Millipore's 2006 acquisition of Serologicals Corporation provided entry to high-growth markets for drug discovery products and services, antibodies, cell biology reagents, and stem cell research. As of the late 2000s, Millipore was the only company providing both upstream cell culture and downstream separations offerings for biopharmaceutical production.

== Timeline ==
=== 1950s ===
- 1954: Jack Bush purchases the rights to a new membrane-production process developed by Lovell Chemical Company. Millipore Filter Corporation is incorporated and Bush becomes president, and later chairman
- 1955: Millipore receives its first patent, for microporous nylon film invented by Stanley Lovell and Jack Bush

=== 1960s ===
- 1964: opens first subsidiary, in France
- 1967: introduces the Super-Q water purification system
- 1967: establishes German subsidiary
- 1968: establishes Japanese subsidiary
- 1968: introduces Pellicon cassette product, for purifying biotherapeutics

=== 1970s ===
- 1971: introduces the original Millex syringe filter—the first disposable syringe filter
- 1972: opens subsidiary in Spain
- 1972: opens a manufacturing plant in Jaffrey, New Hampshire.
- 1973: starts manufacturing in Molsheim, France
- 1973: introduces the Milli-Q water purification system, the first lab-scale ultrapure water system
- 1978: reaches $100 million revenue
- 1978: opens manufacturing plant in Danvers, Massachusetts
- 1979: acquires Waters Associates Inc., a producer of chromatographic media and High-performance liquid chromatography instrumentation

=== 1980s ===
- 1980: introduces low-protein binding Durapore polyvinylidene fluoride membrane
- 1987: listed on the New York Stock Exchange
- 1987: achieves $500 million revenue
- 1988: opens membrane manufacturing plant in County Cork, Ireland

=== 1990s ===
- 1994: divests its Waters Chromatography Division to focus on its membrane business
- 1996: acquires Amicon separation sciences business from W. R. Grace and Company
- 1997: acquires Tylan General, expanding its gas purification offerings for the microelectronics industry
- 1999: acquires Bioprocessing Limited, a developer and manufacturer of chromatography

=== 2000s ===
- 2001: spins off its Microelectronics Division (30% of its revenue), that becomes Mykrolis, which will merge with Entegris in 2005
- 2002: opens Biopharmaceutical Technology Center in Billerica, Massachusetts
- 2005: acquires MicroSafe, a European contract testing laboratory
- 2005: acquires NovAseptic, supplier of aseptically designed components for biotech and pharmaceutical production
- 2005: forms alliance with Gen-Probe to develop, manufacture and commercialize products for rapid microbiological and virus monitoring
- 2006: acquires Newport Bio Systems, a maker of process containers and systems used in biopharmaceutical production
- 2006: acquires Serologicals Corporation (including the companies Chemicon, Upstate, Linco, and Celliance), expanding its drug discovery and development footprint
- 2006: opens a new Research and Development Center in Bedford, Massachusetts
- 2007: launches its new brand
- 2008: expands drug discovery and development facility in St. Charles, Missouri
- 2008: opens membrane casting manufacturing facility in Carrigtwohill, County Cork, Ireland
- 2009: acquires Guava Technologies, a provider of bench top cell analysis systems
- 2009: opens Biomanufacturing Sciences and Training Center in Singapore
- 2009: acquires BioAnaLab, a European-based firm specializing in the analysis of biologic drugs and vaccines
- 2010: Merck KGaA acquires Millipore, which will be part of the EMD Group
- 2015: Merck completes $17 billion acquisition of Sigma-Aldrich, combining EMD Millipore and Sigma-Aldrich to create life science company MilliporeSigma

== Financial history ==
Millipore Corporation had been publicly traded on the OTC, or NASDAQ, exchange where it had paid a cash dividend to shareholders every year since 1966. In 1987 Millipore Corporation moved from the NASDAQ exchange to the New York Stock Exchange, where it traded under the ticker symbol MIL. Millipore Corporation was on the S&P 500 list of the largest publicly traded companies in the United States until it was acquired by Merck kGaA in 2010. The deal was valued at approximately EUR 5.3 billion (US$7.2 billion). Merck KGaA is not associated with Merck & Co., although the two companies stem from the same parent company.
