= Tecemotide =

Chemical compound used in cancer therapy

Vaccine description
- Target: MUC1
- Vaccine type: Protein subunit

Clinical data
- Other names: Emepepimut-S; Stimuvax; BLP25; EMD 531444; L-BLP25; BLP25 liposomal vaccine

Identifiers
- CAS Number: 221214-84-2 (antigen)
- UNII: Q7Y026G2CX

Chemical and physical data
- Formula: C_{124}H_{203}N_{33}O_{38}

Tecemotide (INN; emepepimut-S (USAN); formerly known as BLP25 or EMD 531444) is a synthetic lipopeptide that is used as antigen in an investigational therapeutic cancer vaccine (formerly known as Stimuvax, L-BLP25, BLP25 liposomal vaccine, or BLP25 liposome vaccine). The investigational therapeutic cancer vaccine is designed to induce a cellular immune response to cancer cells that express MUC1, a glycoprotein antigen that is widely over-expressed on common cancers such as lung cancer, breast cancer, prostate cancer, and colorectal cancer. The cellular immune response may lead to a rejection of tumor tissue expressing the MUC1 antigen.

== Collaboration ==
Tecemotide was developed – until Clinical trial phase II – by the Canadian biotech company Biomira Inc., which changed its company name to Oncothyreon Inc. in 2007. Oncothyreon is now located in Seattle, Washington, and it changed its name to SGEN after a merger and acquisition in March 2018.

In 2001, Merck KGaA, of Darmstadt, Germany, entered into a collaboration and supply agreement with Biomira. In 2007, Merck KGaA acquired the exclusive worldwide marketing rights from Biomira, and Merck KGaA has since then been entirely responsible for the further clinical development of tecemotide. In 2008, Merck KGaA acquired the manufacturing rights for tecemotide from Oncothyreon. In 2011, Ono Pharmaceutical Company, of Japan, acquired a co-development and co-marketing license for tecemotide in Japan; Ono paid Merck KGaA 5 million euros.

== Composition ==
Tecemotide is a synthetic lipopeptide that is 27 amino acids long. Its molecular formula is C_{124}H_{203}N_{33}O_{38}, and its amino acid sequence is S T A PPAH G VTSAPDTRPAPGSTAPPKG. The first 25 amino acids of tecemotide are derived from the mucin 1 (MUC1, carcinoma-associated mucin, episialin, or CD227) sequence. The 26th modified amino acid, K, is palmityl-lysine (N6-(1-oxohexadecyl)-L-lysine), and the 27th is glycine.

== Structure of the cancer vaccine ==
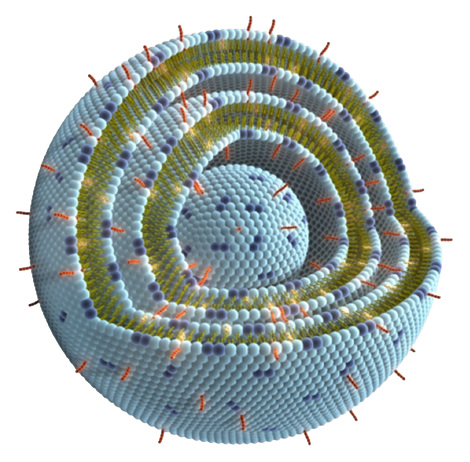
Structure of the cancer vaccine. The antigen tecemotide (orange) and the adjuvant MPL (dark blue) are anchored in the membrane of the liposome. The liposome is formed by the lipids (light blue).

In the investigational therapeutic cancer vaccine (formerly known as Stimuvax, L-BLP25, BLP25 liposomal vaccine or BLP25 liposome vaccine), the antigen tecemotide is anchored — together with the adjuvant 3-O-deacyl-4′-monophosphoryl lipid A (MPL) — in the membrane of the liposome made from the lipids cholesterol, dimyristoyl phosphatidylglycerol (DMPG), and dipalmitoyl phosphatidylcholine. MPL is a derivative of the lipid A molecule found in the membrane of Gram-negative bacteria used as an adjuvant to initiate a non-specific immune stimulus, thereby stimulating the activation of antigen-presenting cells (APCs) through the toll-like receptor 4 (TLR-4) as well as macrophages. MPL is also used as an adjuvant in other vaccines, like Cervarix, a vaccine against certain types of cancer-causing human papillomavirus (HPV).

The precise mixture of lipids in the vaccine, as well as providing the structure of the liposome, is also formulated to enhance the uptake of the vaccine by the aforementioned antigen-presenting cells.

The cancer vaccine is a lyophilized powder, which is formulated to contain 300 μg of tecemotide and 150 μg of MPL per vial.

== Clinical trials ==
=== Overview and results of all trials ===
Tecemotide clinical trials (as of September 2, 2014) sorted by (estimated) primary completion date:

Clinical trials: Lung cancer, Breast cancer, Prostate cancer, Colorectal cancer, and Multiple myeloma
NCT Number / Title	Other IDs	Start date	(Estimated) Primary Completion Date	Recruitment	Conditions	Interventions	Phases	Enrollment (Patients)	Sponsor / Collaborators
Clinical trial number NCT00157209 for "Phase IIb Randomized Controlled Study of BLP25 Liposome Vaccine for Immunotherapy of Non-Small Cell Lung Cancer" at ClinicalTrials.gov	B25-LG-304 / EMR 63325-005	August 2000	March 2006	Completed	Lung Neoplasms, Carcinoma, Non-Small-Cell Lung	Biological: BLP25 Liposome Vaccine plus best supportive care; Other: Best Supportive Care (BSC)	Phase 2	171	Merck KGaA
Clinical trial number NCT00157209 for "Phase IIb Randomized Controlled Study of BLP25 Liposome Vaccine for Immunotherapy of Non-Small Cell Lung Cancer" at ClinicalTrials.gov	Results: A Phase IIb clinical trial of 171 patients with inoperable stage IIIb non-small-cell lung cancer (NSCLC), in which tecemotide showed a trend towards extending median overall survival from 13.3 months for patients receiving best supportive care (BSC) to 30.6 months for patients receiving tecemotide plus BSC. Although this represents a subgroup analysis that is not statistically significant (with a nonsignificant P-value: p = 0.16), the magnitude of the difference and its durability over a prolonged period of follow up suggest an efficacy signal for the vaccine and would support further testing of tecemotide in a definitive phase III trial. Reported side effects included mild-to-moderate flu-like symptoms, gastrointestinal disturbances, and mild injection-site reactions.Butts C, Maksymiuk A, Goss G, Soulières D, Marshall E, Cormier Y, et al. (September 2011). "Updated survival analysis in patients with stage IIIB or IV non-small-cell lung cancer receiving BLP25 liposome vaccine (L-BLP25): phase IIB randomized, multicenter, open-label trial". Journal of Cancer Research and Clinical Oncology. 137 (9): 1337–1342. doi:10.1007/s00432-011-1003-3. PMC 11828286. PMID 21744082. S2CID 25108866.								
NCT00157196; Safety Study of BLP25 Liposome Vaccine in Non-Small Cell Lung Cancer Patients With Unresectable Stage III Disease	B25-LG-305 / EMR 63325-006	April 2005	September 2009	Completed	Carcinoma, Non-Small-Cell Lung, Lung Neoplasms	Biological: BLP25 Liposome Vaccine	Phase 2	22	Merck KGaA
NCT00925548; STRIDE - STimulating Immune Response In aDvanced brEast Cancer	STRIDE, EMR 200038–010, 2008-005544-17	September 2009	August 2010	Terminated	Breast Cancer	Biological: Tecemotide (L-BLP25) and Hormonal Treatment, Biological: Placebo of tecemotide (L-BLP25) and Hormonal Treatment, Drug: cyclophosphamide, Drug: sodium chloride (NaCl)	Phase 3	16	EMD Serono
NCT00925548; STRIDE - STimulating Immune Response In aDvanced brEast Cancer	A thirty-site phase III trial (STRIDE) began in September 2009 on 900 women. The purpose of this study is to determine whether the addition of tecemotide to hormonal treatment is effective in prolonging progression-free survival in postmenopausal women with endocrine-sensitive inoperable locally advanced, recurrent, or metastatic breast cancer. Results: The U.S. Food and Drug Administration (FDA) put the Phase III STRIDE trial on hold in March 2010 after a patient participating in a Phase II clinical trial with tecemotide in patients with multiple myeloma developed encephalitis. The study was terminated in August 2010 (16 patients were enrolled in the study).								
NCT01094548; Study of Stimuvax in Patients With Slowly Progressive Multiple Myeloma With no Symptoms and Who Have Had no Chemotherapy	EMR63325-008	February 2008	February 2011	Completed	Multiple Myeloma	Biological: L-BLP25, cyclophosphamide prior to first vaccination, Biological: L-BLP25	Phase 2	34	Merck KGaA
NCT00409188; Cancer Vaccine Study for Unresectable Stage III Non-small Cell Lung Cancer	START, EMR 63325-001	January 2007	August 2012	Completed	Non-small Cell Lung Cancer	Biological: Tecemotide (L-BLP25), Biological: Placebo	Phase 3	1513	EMD Serono, Merck KGaA
NCT00409188; Cancer Vaccine Study for Unresectable Stage III Non-small Cell Lung Cancer	Results: The primary endpoint of overall survival was not met in the START trial. However, the exploratory subgroup analysis in the START trial generated a reasonable hypothesis to warrant additional study.Kolahdooz F, Jang SL, Corriveau A, Gotay C, Johnston N, Sharma S (October 2014). "Knowledge, attitudes, and behaviours towards cancer screening in indigenous populations: a systematic review". The Lancet. Oncology. 15 (11): e504–e516. doi:10.1016/S1470-2045(14)70508-X. PMID 25281469.								
NCT01731587; Anti-cancDer MUC1-specific Immunotherapy for Unresectable Stage III Non-small Cell Lung Cancer	FINGERPRINT, EMR 63325–019, 2012-001435-31			Withdrawn	Non-small Cell Lung Cancer (NSCLC) Stage III	Other: Biological: MUC1 peptide specific immunotherapy, Drug: Cyclophosphamide (CPA)	Phase 1	0	Merck KGaA
NCT00960115; Study of EMD531444 in Subjects With Stage III Unresectable Non-small Cell Lung Cancer (NSCLC) Following Primary Chemoradiotherapy	EMR063325-009	December 2008	May 2014	Completed	Non-small Cell Lung Cancer	Biological: cyclophosphamide + EMD531444 + BSC, Biological: Saline + Placebo + BSC	Phase 1, Phase 2	205	Merck KGaA, Merck Serono Co., Ltd., Japan
NCT00960115; Study of EMD531444 in Subjects With Stage III Unresectable Non-small Cell Lung Cancer (NSCLC) Following Primary Chemoradiotherapy	Results: The analysis of EMR 63325–009, a randomized, double-blind, placebo-controlled, Phase I/II study in Japanese patients with Stage III unresectable, locally advanced NSCLC who had received concurrent or sequential chemoradiotherapy (CRT), with a minimum of two cycles of platinum-based chemotherapy and radiation dose ≥50 Gy shows the following results: Of the patients included in the Phase II part of the study, the majority had received concurrent CRT. The results indicate that no effect has been observed for either the primary endpoint, overall survival (OS), or any of the secondary endpoints (progression-free survival [PFS], time to progression [TTP], and time to treatment failure). An analysis of the reported adverse events has not identified a clinically meaningful difference in the frequency between treatment groups. Merck Serono made the recommendation to stop the investigational treatment for patients in the EMR 63325-009 study in Japan.								
EudraCT: 2011-004822-85; A prospective, open, randomized, phase-II study of a therapeutic cancer vaccine (L-BLP25, Stimuvax) in the pre-operative treatment of women with primary breast cancer	ABCSG-34 / EMR 63325-603	Jan 2012	May 2014	Active, not recruiting	Breast Cancer	L-BLP25 (Stimuvax), Cyclophosphamide (CPA), LETROZOLE, EPIRUBICIN, DOCETAXEL	Phase 2	400	ABCSG (Austrian Breast & Colorectal Cancer Study Group)
EudraCT: 2011-004822-85; A prospective, open, randomized, phase-II study of a therapeutic cancer vaccine (L-BLP25, Stimuvax) in the pre-operative treatment of women with primary breast cancer	Results: 8 May 2012: Enrollment expected to be completed in May 2014; First results available end of 2014; 26 Sept 2014: Enrollment of 400 patients completed								
NCT01507103; Tecemotide (L-BLP25) in Rectal Cancer	SPRINT, EMR063325-013, 2011-000847-25	February 2012	June 2014	Active, not recruiting	Rectal Cancer	Cyclophosphamide (CPA), Tecemotide (L-BLP25)	Phase 2	124	Merck KGaA
NCT00828009; BLP25 Liposome Vaccine and Bevacizumab After Chemotherapy and Radiation Therapy in Treating Patients With Newly Diagnosed Stage IIIA or Stage IIIB Non-Small Cell Lung Cancer That Cannot Be Removed by Surgery	CDR0000632611, E6508	December 2010	January 2016	Recruiting	Lung Cancer	Biological: bevacizumab, Biological: emepepimut-S, Drug: carboplatin, Drug: cyclophosphamide, Drug: paclitaxel, Radiation: radiation therapy	Phase 2	55	Eastern Cooperative Oncology Group, National Cancer Institute (NCI)
NCT01462513; L-BLP25 in Patients With Colorectal Carcinoma After Curative Resection of Hepatic Metastases	LICC01	August 2011	September 2016	Recruiting	Colon Carcinoma, Rectum Carcinoma	Biological: L-BLP25, Biological: Placebo	Phase 2	159	Johannes Gutenberg University Mainz, Dr. Carl Schimanski
NCT01496131; Tecemotide (L-BLP25) in Prostate Cancer	EMR 63325–015, BB-IND 7787	October 2011	August 2017	Recruiting	Prostate Cancer	Radiation: Radiation therapy, Drug: Goserelin, Drug: Cyclophosphamide, Drug: Tecemotide (L-BLP25)	Phase 2	48	EMD Serono, National Cancer Institute (NCI)
NCT02049151; Tecemotide Following Concurrent Chemo-radiotherapy for Non-small Cell Lung Cancer	START2, EMR 63325–021, 2013-003760-30	March 2014	July 2018	Recruiting	Carcinoma, Non-Small-Cell Lung	Drug: Tecemotide, Drug: Placebo, Drug: Cyclophosphamide (CPA), Drug: Saline (sodium chloride)	Phase 3	1002	EMD Serono
NCT01423760; Collect Long-term Data on Subjects Following Participation in Previous EMD 531444 (L-BLP25 or BLP25 Liposome Vaccine) Clinical Trials	EMR 63325-011	January 2012	December 2019	Enrolling by invitation	Non-Small Cell Lung Cancer, Multiple Myeloma	Biological: Tecemotide, Other: No intervention		262	Merck KGaA
NCT01015443; Cancer Vaccine Study for Stage III, Unresectable, Non-small Cell Lung Cancer (NSCLC) in the Asian Population	INSPIRE, EMR63325-012	December 2009	May 2020	Recruiting	Non-Small Cell Lung Cancer	Biological: Tecemotide (L-BLP25), Biological: Placebo	Phase 3	500	Merck KGaA
Note: Merck KGaA and Oncothyreon are not reporting in their annual reports on colorectal cancer trials and prostate cancer trials

=== Overview of completed trials ===
Overview of completed tecemotide trials (as of September 2, 2014) where results have been published, sorted by primary completion date:

ID	Phase	Indication	Start	Primary Completion Date	Summary of the results
EMR 63325-005	2	NSCLC	August 2000	March 2006	Subgroup analysis favorable.
START, EMR 63325-001	3	NSCLC	January 2007	August 2012	Primary endpoint not met. Subgroup analysis favorable.
EMR 63325-009 (Japan study)	1, 2	NSCLC	December 2008	May 2014	Primary endpoint and secondary endpoints not met. Subgroup analysis not favorable.

=== Discontinued development ===
On August 18 and September 12, 2014, Oncothyreon and Merck KGaA, respectively, reported that a randomized Phase 1/2 study, EMR 63325–009, of tecemotide compared to a placebo in Japanese patients with Stage III non-small cell lung cancer did not meet its primary endpoint of an improvement in overall survival, and no treatment effect was seen in any of the secondary endpoints (progression-free survival, time to progression, or time to failure). Merck made the recommendation to stop the investigational treatment of patients in the EMR 63325-009 study in Japan.

Furthermore, Merck KGaA announced its decision to discontinue the Phase III START2 and INSPIRE studies, and all other Merck-sponsored clinical trials with tecemotide in NSCLC, worldwide. Merck will continue to supply tecemotide for ongoing investigator-sponsored trials in other indications in accordance with their agreements with the sponsors of these studies.

== Drug development risks ==
Risks that could affect the further development of tecemotide published in the annual reports of Oncothyreon (grantor of the license) and Merck KGaA (license holder; responsible for clinical development, marketing and manufacturing) are listed in the following sections.

=== Efficacy ===
As published so far, primary end points have not been met in the clinical studies, and tecemotide has shown treatment effects only in statistical analyses of certain subgroups.

=== Patent situation ===
Oncothyreon's patent protection for tecemotide in the U.S. was scheduled to expire in 2018.

=== Human resources ===
In 2013, Merck KGaA reported problems with recruiting and retaining qualified employees: "Sourcing, recruiting and retaining specialists and talent at Merck are among the company's top priorities. Nevertheless, employee-related risks that affect business activities are likely, even though their impact is difficult to assess. Merck rates this as a medium risk."

Merck KGaA further reported with respect to its pharma division, Merck Serono: "Over 80% of the Merck Serono senior management positions [have been] replaced since 2011 [as of September 2014]."

=== Novel technologies ===
Tecemotide is based on novel technologies, which may raise new regulatory issues that could delay or complicate regulatory approval. Additionally, as of 2013, the FDA had approved for commercial sale in the United States only one active vaccine designed to stimulate an immune response against cancer. Consequently, there is limited precedent for the successful development or commercialization of products based on these technologies in this area.

=== Manufacture ===
Merck KGaA currently relies on third-party manufacturers to supply the product candidate: On Baxter International for the manufacture of tecemotide, and on GlaxoSmithKline plc (GSK) for the manufacture of the adjuvant in tecemotide, monophosphoryl lipid A (MPL). As of 2013, there was a risk that if tecemotide were not approved by 2015, GSK could terminate its obligation to supply MPL. In this case, Oncothyreon would have had to retain the necessary licenses from GSK required to have the adjuvant MPL manufactured, but the transfer of the process to a third party would delay the development and commercialization of tecemotide.

=== Competition ===
There are currently two products approved as maintenance therapy following treatment of inoperable locoregional Stage III NSCLC with induction chemotherapy: Tarceva (erlotinib), a targeted small molecule from Genentech, a member of the Roche Group, and Alimta (pemetrexed), a chemotherapeutic from Eli Lilly and Company. Tecemotide has not been tested in combination with or in comparison to these products. It is possible that other existing or new agents will be approved for this indication. In addition, there are at least two vaccines in development for the treatment of NSCLC, including GSK's MAGE A3 vaccine in Phase 3 and Transgene's TG-4010 in Phase 2/3. TG-4010 also targets MUC1, although using technology different from tecemotide.

== Drug development cost ==
The costs spent on tecemotide development – beginning in the late 1990s – have not been published in detail by the companies Biomira/Oncothyreon, Merck KGaA, and Ono Pharmaceutical. Additionally, the estimation of the full cost of bringing a new drug to market – from discovery through clinical trials to approval – is complex and controversial.

However, a cautious estimate of the tecmotide development cost spent until 2014 ranges from €300 to €500 million (US$390 to US$650 million; for more information see Drug development).

== Timeline ==
Date	Event
May 1998	Biomira files a BLP25 (tecemotide) patent
May 2001	Biomira licenses BLP25 (tecemotide) to Merck KGaA
Aug 2001	Biomira publishes results of a Phase I study of the BLP25 (tecemotide)Palmer M, Parker J, Modi S, Butts C, Smylie M, Meikle A, et al. (August 2001). "Phase I study of the BLP25 (MUC1 peptide) liposomal vaccine for active specific immunotherapy in stage IIIB/IV non-small-cell lung cancer". Clinical Lung Cancer. 3 (1): 49–57, discussion 58. doi:10.3816/clc.2001.n.018. PMID 14656392.
Mar 2006	Results of the Phase IIb Study (EMR 63325-005): Subgroup analysis favorable
Aug 2007	Merck KGaA acquires worldwide marketing rights for tecemotide from Oncothyreon and will be entirely responsible for the further clinical development of tecemotide
Sep 2007	Biomira changes company name to Oncothyreon
Dec 2008	Merck KGaA acquires manufacturing rights for tecemotide from Oncothyreon
Dec 2009	INSPIRE study (EMR63325-012) started. Estimated primary completion date is May 2020
Oct 2011	Ono Pharmaceutical acquires a co-development and co-marketing license for tecemotide in Japan
Dec 2012	Results of the START study (EMR 63325-001): Primary endpoint not met. Subgroup analysis favorable
Mar 2014	START2 study (EMR 63325-021) started. Estimated primary completion date is July 2018
Aug 2014	Results of the Japan study (EMR 63325-009): Primary endpoint and secondary endpoints not met. Subgroup analysis not favorable
Sep 2014	Merck KGaA terminates the NSCLC development
