= Stefan Oschmann =

German businessman (born 1957)

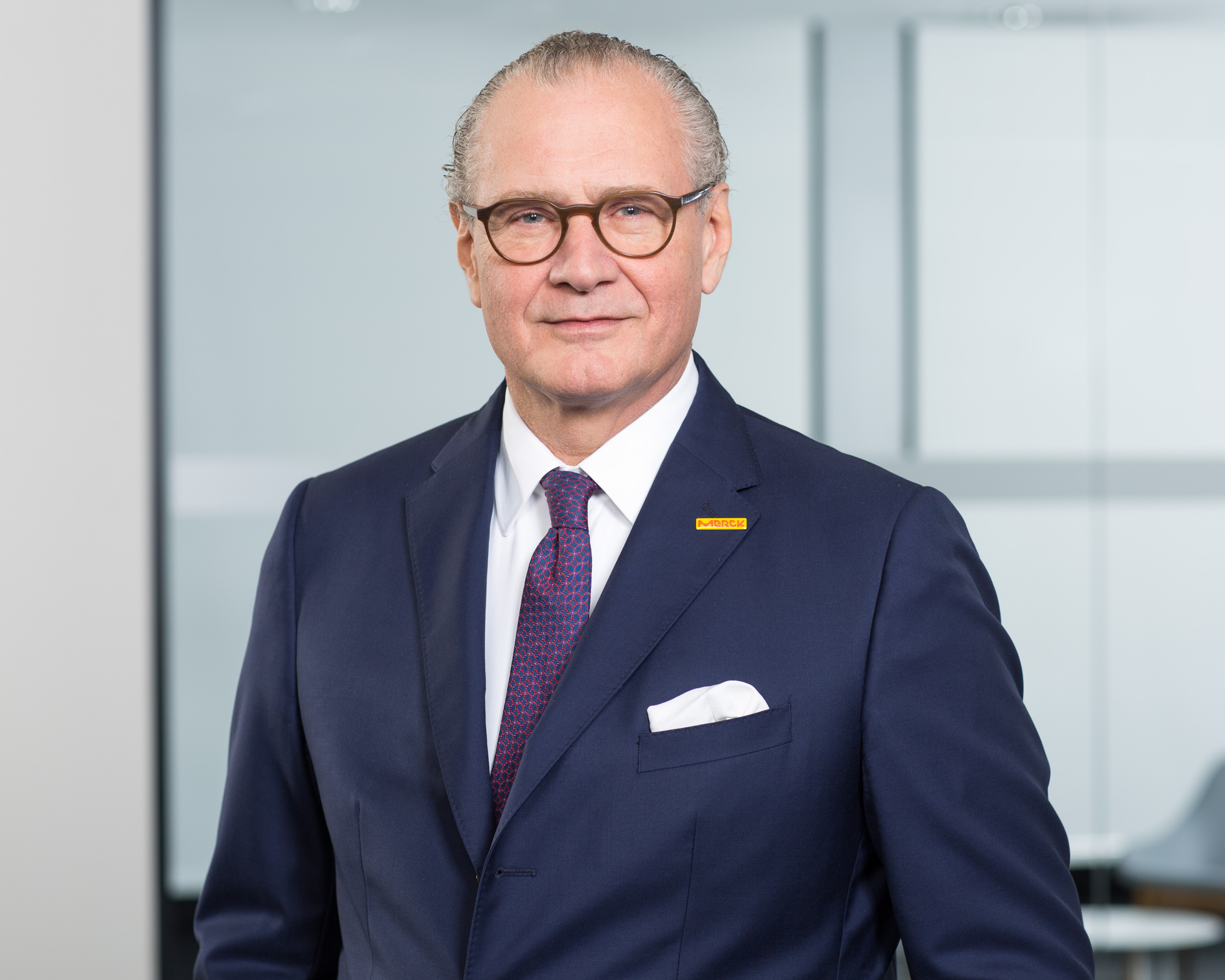
- Born: 25 July 1957 (age 69); Würzburg, Germany
- Education: LMU Munich (PhD in veterinary medicine, 1985)
- Title: Chairman and CEO, Merck Group
- Term: April 2016–April 2021

Stefan Oschmann (born 25 July 1957) is a German businessman. He was the CEO of the pharmaceutical group, Merck.

== Early life and education ==
Stefan Oschmann was born in Würzburg, Germany, on 25 July, 1957. He studied veterinary medicine at LMU Munich from 1977 to 1982. There, he also earned his doctorate in 1985.

== Career ==
Oschmann started his career at an agency of the International Atomic Energy Agency. In 1987, he started working for the German Animal Health Federation (Bundesverband für Tiergesundheit), the trade association for German manufacturers of veterinary drugs and feed additives.

From 1989 to 2011, Oschmann worked for Merck Sharp & Dohme (MSD), the European operations of Merck & Co. He served as managing director of MSD Austria from 1994, vice president for Central and Eastern Europe from 1998, vice president of MSD Europe and managing director of MSD Germany from 1999, senior vice president for worldwide human health marketing from 2005, president for Europe, the Middle East, Africa, and Canada from 2006 and finally MSD's president of emerging markets from 2009 to 2011.

Oschmann joined the Merck Group as a member of the executive board in 2011. He was responsible for the healthcare business sector until the end of 2014. He became vice chairman of the executive board and deputy CEO of the Merck Group in 2015. Oschmann became the chairman of the executive board and CEO of the Merck Group in April 2016, succeeding Karl-Ludwig Kley. He stepped down as Merck CEO at the end of April 2021.

== Board memberships ==
In May 2021, AiCuris AG announced the appointment of Oschmann as the new chair of its supervisory board. Oschmann has also served as a member of the Joint Advisory Board for Allianz and the Business Advisory Board for the German Chemical Industry Association (VCI).

Additionally, Oschmann has held positions with other non-profit organisations. He served as president of the European Federation of Pharmaceutical Industries and Associations (EFPIA), and as president of the International Federation of Pharmaceutical Manufacturers & Associations (IFPMA) from 2014 to 2016. He he also served as member of the board of trustees of the Baden-Badener Unternehmer-Gespräche (BBUG), the Deutsches Museum, Deutsche Welle, and the Max Planck Institute for Medical Research, and a member of the advisory council of the Munich Security Conference. Oschmann has also served as a member of the European Round Table of Industrialists.

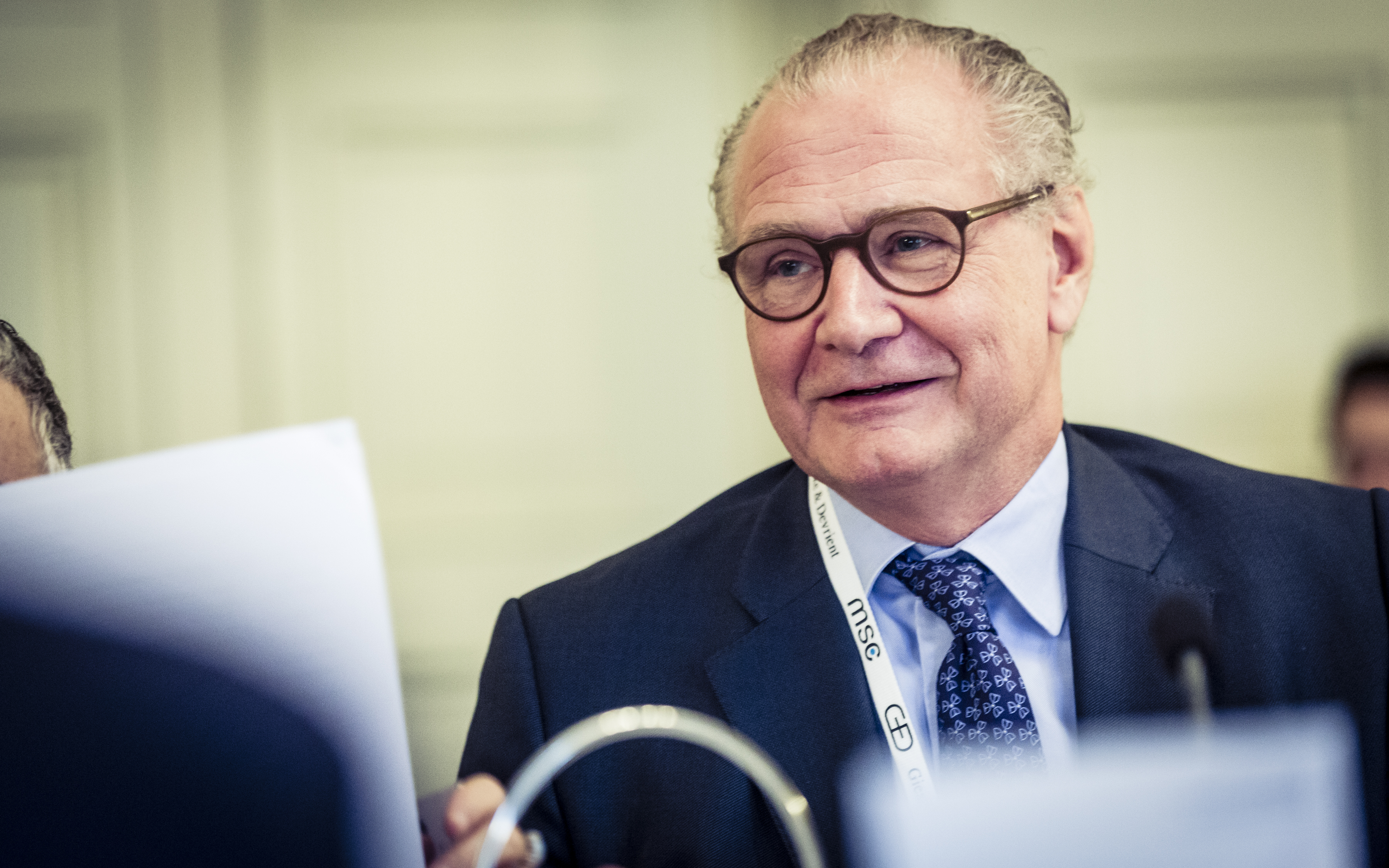
Oschmann during the MSC 201

== Personal life ==
Oschmann and his wife have two children.

Business positions
Preceded by Karl-Ludwig Kley	Chief Executive Officer, Merck Group; April 2016–April 2021	Succeeded by Belén Garijo
