= Air raid =

Air raid may refer to:

== Attacks ==
- Airstrike
- Strategic bombing

== Other uses ==
- Air Raid (album), by the improvisational collective Air
- Air Raid (Transformers), any of three characters in the Transformers universes
- Air Raid (1982 video game), for the Atari 2600
- Air Raid (1978 video game), for the TRS-80
- Air Raid (text), a 1977 text by Alexander Kluge
- "Air Raid" , a 1977 John Varley short story and the basis for the 1983 novel Millennium
  - Millennium, a 1989 film based on the same story
- Air raid offense, a pass-oriented offense in American football

== See also ==
- Air raid siren, a device used to signal a community of imminent danger
