= Sigma-Aldrich =

Healthcare company

Merck / MilliporeSigma
- The company's logo, designed in 2015
- Type: Subsidiary of Merck KGaA
- Traded as: Nasdaq: SIAL
- Industry: chemistry and biotechnology
- Founded: August 1975
- Headquarters: Burlington, Massachusetts, United States
- Key people: Jean-Charles Wirth (Life Science CEO)
- Products: life science technologies and specialty chemicals
- Revenue: EUR€ 6.86 billion (2020)
- Number of employees: more than 20,000
- Parent: Merck KGaA (100%)
- Website: www.sigmaaldrich.com

Sigma-Aldrich (part of MilliporeSigma) is a brand operating within an American chemical, life science, and biotechnology company owned by the multinational chemical conglomerate Merck Group. The life sciences business of Merck Group operates as MilliporeSigma in the United States.

Sigma-Aldrich was created in 1975 by the merger of Sigma Chemical Company and Aldrich Chemical Company. It grew through various acquisitions until it had over 9,600 employees and was listed on the Fortune 1000. The company has two United States headquarters, in St. Louis and Burlington, MA and has operations in approximately 40 countries.

In 2015, the multinational chemical conglomerate Merck Group acquired Sigma-Aldrich for $17 billion. The company is currently a part of Merck's life science business and in combination with Merck's earlier acquired Millipore, operates as MilliporeSigma. It is headquartered in Burlington, Massachusetts, United States.

== History ==
Sigma Chemical Company of St. Louis and Aldrich Chemical Company of Milwaukee were both American specialty chemical companies when they merged in August 1975. The company grew throughout the 1980s and 1990s, with significant expansion in facilities, acquisitions and diversification into new market sectors.

=== Early history ===
- 1935 – Midwest Consultants was founded in St Louis by brothers Aaron Fischer and Bernard Fischlowitz, who hired chemical engineer Daniel Broida.
  - 1946 – Sigma was formed from Midwest Consultants and manufactured just adenosine triphosphate. They were the first to manufacture pure ATP.
  - 1972 – Sigma's IPO
- 1951 – Aldrich founded in Milwaukee by Alfred Bader and Jack Eisendrath and manufactured just 1-methyl-3-nitro-1-nitrosoguanidine.
  - 1966 – Aldrich's IPO
  - 1972 – Subsidiary Aldrich-Boranes launched to manufacture hydroboration products
- 1975 – Merger of Sigma Chemical and Aldrich Chemical to created Sigma-Aldrich. Their first year earned $43 million in sales.
- 1999 – Sigma-Aldrich reaches $1 billion in sales
- 2005 – Announced membership in The RNAi Consortium
- 2014 – Merck KGaA announced that it would purchase Sigma-Aldrich for approx. $17 billion (€13.1 billion).
- November 3, 2014 – Sigma-Aldrich filed a definitive proxy statement with the U.S. Securities and Exchange Commission to hold a special investors meeting regarding approval for the sale to Merck KGaA.

=== Acquisitions ===
==== 1970s ====
- 1978 – Makor Chemicals

==== 1980s ====
- 1984 – Pathfinder
- 1986 – Bio Yeda, Bristol Organics
- 1989 – Fluka Chemie AG (Swiss company founded in the 1950s) purchased for $39 million.

==== 1990s ====
- 1993 – Supelco, Inc. acquired to enter the chromatography market
- 1994 – LabKemi AB
- 1997 – Research Biochemicals International, Riedel-de-Haen, Techcares Systems, Carbolabs, YA Kemia
- 1998 – Genosys

==== 2000s ====
- 2000 – First Medical Inc., Amelung GmbH, ARK Scientific
- 2001 – ISOTEC (produces stable isotopes used in basic research and medical diagnostics)
- 2004 – Ultrafine (a supplier of contract manufacturing services for drug development), Tetrionics (a producer of high potency and cytotoxic active pharmaceutical ingredients)
- 2005 – JRH Biosciences, an industrial supplier of cell culture products for the pharmaceutical and biotechnology industries; Proligo Group, a global supplier of genomics research tools
- 2006 – Beijing Superior Chemicals, Iropharm, Pharmorphix, Advanced Separation Technologies (manufacturer of products for chiral chromatography)
- 2007 – Epichem acquired to expand capabilities in materials sciences and semiconductor markets; Molecular Medicine BioServices acquired to provide large-scale viral manufacturing capabilities; announced alliance with Sangamo BioSciences to develop zinc finger-based laboratory research reagents
- 2009 – ChemNavigator
- 2010 – Cerilliant Corporation, ACE Animals
- 2011 – Resource Technology Corp, Vetec Quimica Fina
- 2012 – Research Organics Inc., BioReliance (a toxicology and veterinary diagnostics company); BioReliance had previously been acquired by Invitrogen and subsequently sold to Avista Capital Partners.
- 2014 – Cell Marque
- 2015 – Combined with EMD Millipore to make MilliporeSigma.

== Key numbers ==
Key numbers for Sigma-Aldrich.

Revenues:

- $2.79 billion (2014)

Products:

- 100,000 chemical products (46,000 manufactured)
- 30,000 laboratory equipment products

Customers:

- Approximately one million individual customers worldwide
- 88,000 accounts

Geographies (% of 2008 sales):

- United States 35%
- Europe 43%
- Canada, Asia Pacific, Latin America 22%

== Subsidiaries ==
The Aldrich Logo.

Aldrich is a supplier in the research and fine chemicals market. Aldrich provides organic and inorganic chemicals, building blocks, reagents, advanced materials and stable isotopes for chemical synthesis, medicinal chemistry and materials science. Aldrich's chemicals catalog, the "Aldrich Catalog and Handbook" is often used as a handbook due to the inclusion of structures, physical data, and literature references.

The Sigma Logo.

Sigma is the Sigma-Aldrich's main biochemical supplier, with offerings including antibiotics, buffers, carbohydrates, enzymes, forensic tools, hematology and histology, nucleotides, proteins, peptides, amino acids and their derivatives.

The Sigma RBI Logo.

Sigma RBI produces specialized products for use in the field of cell signaling and neuroscience. Their offerings range from standard biochemical reagents to specialized research tools, including ligands for receptors and ion channels, enzyme inhibitors, phosphospecific antibodies, key signal transduction enzymes, and assay kits for cell signaling.

The ISOTEC Logo.

ISOTEC provides isotopically labeled products for protein structure determination, peptide synthesis, proteomics, metabolic research, magnetic resonance imaging, nuclear magnetic resonance, breath test substrates, agriculture, as well as gas and gas mixes.

The Riedel-de Haën Logo.

Riedel-de Haën was incorporated with Sigma-Aldrich in 1999 and manufactures reagents and standards.

The Supelco Logo.

Supelco is the chromatography products branch of Sigma-Aldrich. It provides chromatography columns and related tools for environmental, government, food and beverage, pharmaceutical, biotechnology, medical and chemical laboratories; sample preparation products and chemical reference standards.

The SAFC Logo.

Sigma-Aldrich Fine Chemicals (SAFC) is the fine chemical supply branch of Sigma-Aldrich specializing in raw materials for cell culture products; customized services for raw materials, manufacturing of active pharmaceutical ingredients.

Sigma Life Science provides products such as custom DNA/RNA oligos; custom DNA and LNA probes; siRNA; isotopically-labelled peptides and peptide libraries.

Sigma Advanced Genetic Engineering (SAGE) Labs was a division within Sigma-Aldrich that specializes in genetic manipulation of in vivo systems for special research and development applications. It was formed in 2008 to investigate zinc finger nuclease technology and its application for disease research models. Located in St. Louis, Missouri, SAGE Labs have developed knockout rats for the study of human diseases and disorders (such as autism), which are sold for up to US$95,000. SAGE also announced its first successful effort in creating a "knockout rabbit". Its facilities include a specific pathogen free, biosecure vivarium as well as research and development labs. SAGE Labs was acquired by Horizon Discovery Group in 2014.

Carbolabs produces research quantities of chemicals produced by phosgenation reactions. The company was acquired in 1998.

BioReliance provides testing and manufacturing services to pharmaceutical and biopharmaceutical companies that span the product cycle from early pre-clinical development to licensed production. The company was acquired by Sigma Aldrich in January 2012.

== Current leadership ==
Jean-Charles Wirth became CEO of the Life Science business of Merck KGaA, Darmstadt, Germany in June 2025 following Matthias Heinzel's departure from the company.
