= Merck Manuals =

Online medical reference works

The Merck Manuals The MSD Manuals
- Website type: Health Information
- Available in: Merck: American/Canadian English, Spanish, French; MSD: Arabic, German, English, Spanish, French, Hindi, Italian, Japanese, Korean, Portuguese, Russian, Ukrainian, Vietnamese, Chinese, Swahili, Indonesian
- Founded: 1899; 127 years ago (as a printed manual); 2015 (launched as a website)
- Key people: Sandy J. Falk, MD (Editor-in-Chief)
- Parent: Merck & Co.
- Website: www.merckmanuals.com (U.S. and Canada) www.msdmanuals.com (worldwide) www.msdmanuals.cn (Chinese)

The Merck Manuals (outside the U.S. and Canada: MSD Manuals) are medical references published by the American pharmaceutical company Merck & Co. (known as MSD outside the United States and Canada), that cover a wide range of medical topics, including disorders, tests, diagnoses, and drugs. The manuals have been published since 1899, when Merck & Co. was still a subsidiary of the German company Merck.

These manuals were originally developed in book form, but have been updated and converted to digital formats, including websites and mobile apps. Digital versions also include audio, 3D models, and animations.

The first Merck Manual, Merck's Manual of the Materia Medica (1899), was a small reference book that became widely used by the 1980s. It had also become the world's best-selling medical text. Since then, several manuals have been produced, and are regularly updated. The titles include:

- The Merck Manual of Diagnosis and Therapy, commonly called The Merck Manual. This is the descendant of the 1899 book.
- The Merck Manual—Home Health Handbook is a consumer edition, introduced in 1997. An updated third edition was released in 2009.
- The Merck Manual of Patient Symptoms was a small printed reference summary of symptoms intended for medical students, physician assistants, and the like.
- The Merck Veterinary Manual, introduced in 1955, covers animal health care.
- The Merck Manual for Pet Health is a consumer, or pet owner, edition.
- The Merck Manual of Geriatrics was introduced in 1990, focusing on health care for older patients.
- The Merck Manual of Health & Aging is a consumer edition.

The Manuals for human health were converted to a web-based format in 2015 and are hosted on MerckManuals.com in the US and Canada, and MSDManuals.com throughout the rest of the world. These sites include two versions tailored for consumers and for health care professionals respectively. The Manuals are available online in 16 languages. The Manuals for animal health were converted to a web-based format in 2002 and are hosted on MerckVetManual.com (outside the U.S. and Canada MSDVetManual.com).

== See also ==
- The Merck Index is a related product aimed at chemists; originally published in 1889, it predates The Merck Manual. It is now produced by the Royal Society of Chemistry.
