= CCDM =

CCDM may refer to:

- Control of Communicable Diseases Manual
- Catalog of Components of Double and Multiple Stars
- Collisionless cold dark matter
