= Merck Veterinary Manual =

Reference book and website

- Cover of 1955 edition
- Editor: Laurie Hess (Editor-in-Chief)
- Genre: Veterinary medicine
- Published: 1955
- Publisher: Merck & Co.
- Media type: Print (1955–2016), Online
- Website: merckvetmanual.com msdvetmanual.com

The Merck Veterinary Manual is a reference manual of animal health care. It was first published by Merck & Co., Inc. in 1955. It contains concise, thorough information on the diagnosis and treatment of disease in a wide variety of species. The Manual is available as a book, published on a non-profit basis. Additionally, the full text can be accessed for free via the website, or downloaded in its entirety via an app. Outside the United States, Canada, and Puerto Rico, it is known as the MSD Veterinary Manual. The content is available in English and Spanish. In January 2020, the website was redesigned with a more helpful search function without advertising. Interactive features on the website include quizzes, case studies, and clinical calculators. In addition, there are animal health news summaries and commentaries.

== History ==
The Merck Veterinary Manual was first published in 1955. It was based on the Merck Manual of Diagnosis and Therapy, which was first published in 1899 as a reference for physicians. The first edition of the Veterinary Manual included contributions from over 200 authors, with 389 chapters divided into sections on public health, toxicology, and diseases of domestic animals, zoo and fur animals, and poultry. The first five editions were edited by Otto H. Siegmund. The fifth edition was published in 1979. The sixth and seventh editions were edited by Clarence M. Fraser.

The eighth edition, edited by Susan Aeillo, was published in 1988 with contributions from 317 authors. A review in the Canadian Veterinary Journal declared it to be an 'excellent veterinary handbook'. The ninth edition was published in 2005, and included chapters by over 350 authors. New subjects included Hendra virus infection in the horse, and biosecurity. The tenth edition, published in 2010 and edited by Cynthia M. Kahn, was the first to contain images. It included radiographs, illustrations, and photomicrographs, as well as new chapters, including one on African hedgehogs.

The eleventh edition, published in 2016, had over 400 contributing authors. New topics in the eleventh edition included backyard poultry and smoke inhalation. In 2018, a free app version was made available which included a 57 megabyte download of all the information from the eleventh edition.
