= Kenneth Frazier =

American business executive (born 1954)

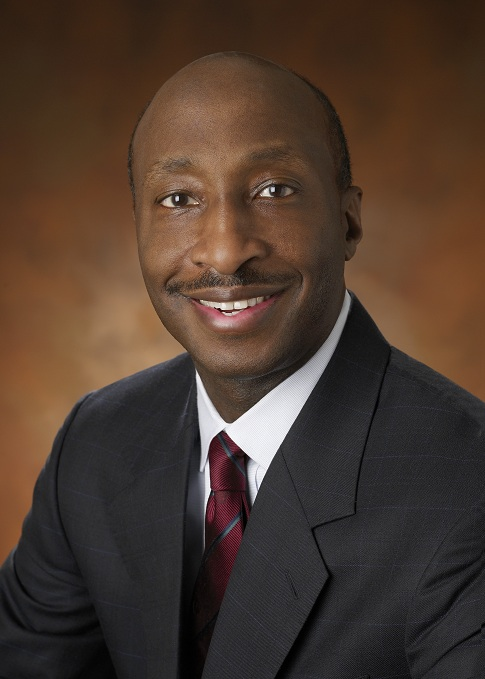
- Born: Kenneth Carleton Frazier; December 17, 1954 (age 71); Philadelphia, Pennsylvania, U.S.
- Education: Pennsylvania State University, University Park (BA); Harvard University (JD)
- Occupations: Executive chairman, Merck & Co.

Kenneth Carleton Frazier (born December 17, 1954) is an American business executive. He is executive chairman and former CEO of the pharmaceutical company Merck & Co. (known as MSD outside of North America). After joining Merck & Co. as general counsel, he directed the company's defense against litigation over the anti-inflammatory drug Vioxx. Frazier is the first African American man to lead a major pharmaceutical company (part of the Fortune 500 companies). He was elected to the American Philosophical Society in 2018.

Frazier was included in Time's list of the most influential people in the world in 2018 and 2021.

== Early life and education ==
Kenneth Frazier was born on December 17, 1954, in North Philadelphia. His father, Otis, was a janitor. Frazier has said Thurgood Marshall was one of his heroes growing up. Frazier's mother died when he was twelve years old. He attended Julia R. Masterman School and Northeast High School. After graduating at age 16, he entered Pennsylvania State University. To make extra money in college, he raised tadpoles and newts and sold them to local stores.

After earning his B.A. from Penn State, Frazier enrolled at Harvard Law School and graduated in 1978 with a J.D.

== Career ==
=== Drinker Biddle ===
After graduating from Harvard, Frazier began his law career with Drinker Biddle & Reath in Philadelphia. In 1991, Esther F. Lardent, head of the Death Penalty Representation Project, asked Frazier to defend death-row inmate James Willie "Bo" Cochran. Cochran had been arrested and accused of murdering an assistant manager at a Birmingham grocery store in 1976. Frazier, then a partner at Drinker Biddle, and two colleagues took the case. In 1995, after 19 years on death row, the United States Courts of Appeals for the Eleventh Circuit overturned Cochran's conviction. In 1997, Cochran was retried and found not guilty. Frazier continued to represent him after leaving Drinker Biddle. During Frazier's law career, he also took four summer sabbaticals to teach trial advocacy in South Africa.

=== Merck & Co. ===
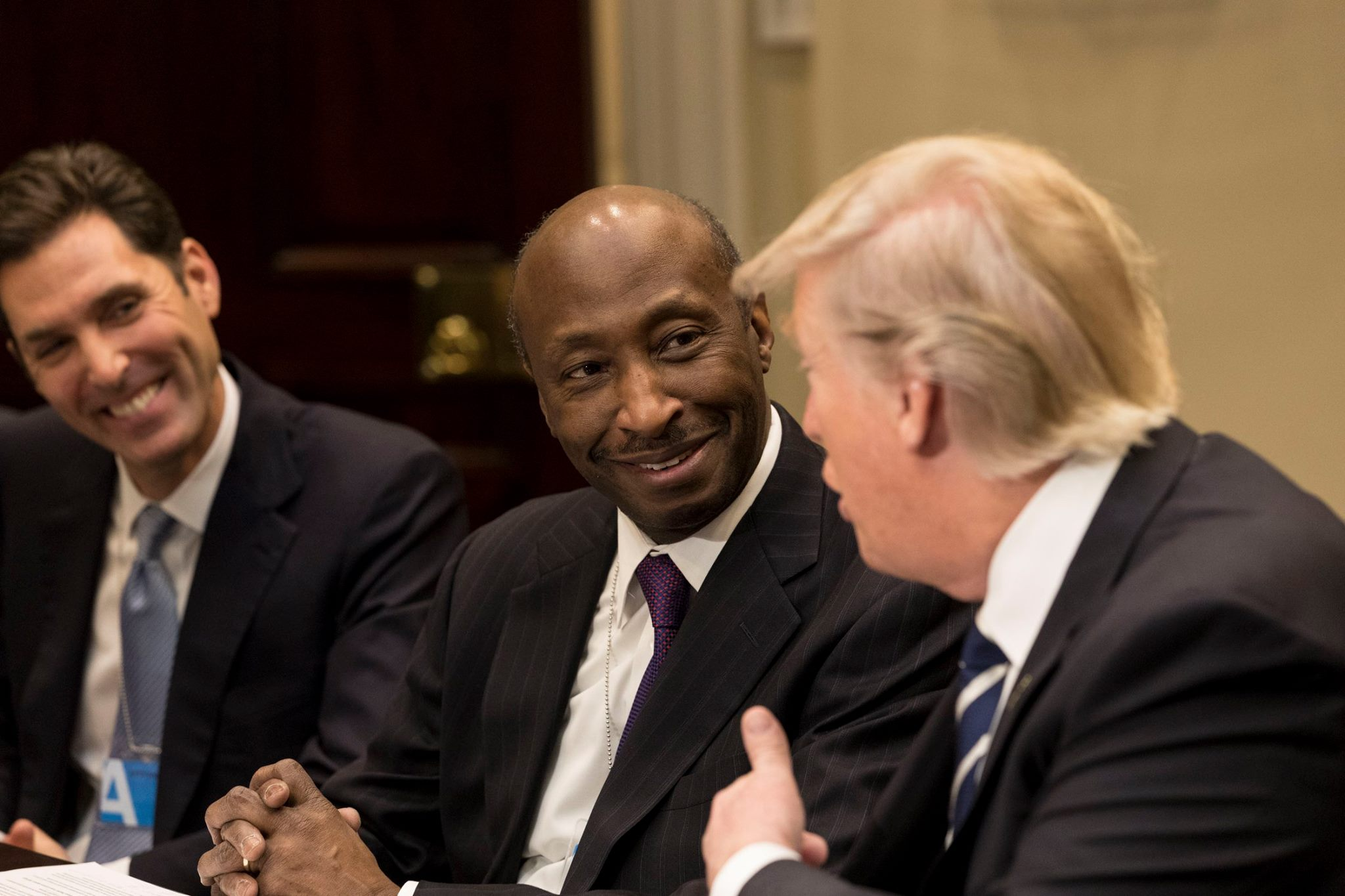
Frazier meets with President Donald Trump in January 2017

Frazier at an event with President Joe Biden and Alex Gorsky in March 2021

As a lawyer at Drinker Biddle, one of Frazier's clients was Merck & Co., the second-largest drug company in the United States. In 1992, he joined Merck's public affairs division as general counsel. Frazier was named senior general counsel in 1999. As general counsel, he was credited with overseeing the company's defense against claims that the anti-inflammatory drug Vioxx had caused heart attacks and strokes. Analysts at the time estimated Merck's liability to range from 20 to 50 billion dollars. Frazier said the case was "the most significant challenge [he'd] ever faced". He chose to fight all cases in court rather than settle them all quickly. The remaining cases were settled in 2007 for $4.85 billion.

In 2006, Frazier was promoted to executive vice president in addition to his role as general counsel. He led the company's largest group, Human Health, from 2007 until he was named president of Merck in April 2010. On January 1, 2011, he became CEO and a member of the company's board of directors, replacing former Merck CEO Richard Clark. Frazier is the first African-American to lead a major pharmaceutical company.

As CEO, Frazier has directed the company to take financial risks in developing new treatments. In 2013, he prioritized research funding over meeting the year's earnings target. He has placed special emphasis on improving treatments for Alzheimer's disease. Frazier's father died from Alzheimer's. Frazier has said he is also motivated at Merck by a desire to improve the lives of people in developing countries.

Frazier received a total compensation of $21,387,205 in 2014; $17,023,820 in 2015; and $21,781,200 in 2016. On February 26, 2017, it was reported Frazier owned 600,304 shares of Merck stock worth approximately $37,000,000. Based on stock transactions at Merck alone and his tenure at the company, his net worth is in the hundreds of millions. As of December 31, 2016, Mr. Frazier was eligible for early retirement subsidies under the Qualified Plan and SRP with a pension valued at $26,593,261. In the "annual collaborative report" from Equilar and The New York Times, Frazier ranked 66th in the May 2015 list of "200 highest-paid CEOs of large publicly traded companies" and seventh in the list of biopharmaceutical executives with the highest total compensation.

In July 2016, Frazier sold 60,000 shares of the firm's stock. The stock was sold at an average price of $64.44. In the years 2018, 2019 and 2020 respectively Frazier sold 787,792, 694,698 and 280,000 shares of the firm's stock with a total value at time of sale of $110.23 million. On February 4, 2021, Merck announced that Frazier would be retiring as president and CEO at the end of June, while remaining executive chairman.

== Other work ==
Frazier currently serves on the board of directors of Merck (as executive chairman), the National Constitution Center, and Eikon Therapeutics. Previously, Frazier served on the board of ExxonMobil from 2009 to 2022 and of the Pharmaceutical Research and Manufacturers of America from 2011 to 2021. Frazier presently is a trustee of Cornerstone Christian Academy in Philadelphia.

In November 2011, the Pennsylvania State University board of trustees appointed Frazier (a trustee) to serve as chairman of a special committee investigation into the child sex abuse scandal involving former assistant football coach Jerry Sandusky and allegations of a cover up by university officials. Frazier was criticized by Harrisburg attorney William Cluck for his handling of the Sandusky scandal, particularly its decision to rely on the Louis Freeh Report, which found emails suggesting that university leaders, including head football coach Joe Paterno, knew of reports of Sandusky's sex abuse but failed to report it. At a meeting, when Cluck questioned the Freeh report, Frazier directed a fiery criticism at Cluck and Paterno defenders, saying, "I believe that we are entitled to look at the words and contemporaneous emails and other documents that draw the conclusions that we need to draw as a university. We are not subject to the criminal beyond-a-reasonable-doubt standard [...] If you cared about that, you are one of the few people in this country that looks like you who actually believes the O.J. Simpson not guilty verdict was correct. The fact of the matter is, those documents say what they say, and no amount of hand-waving will ever change what those documents say." Frazier twice apologized for the outburst.

Frazier is a member of the American Law Institute and serves on its council. In May 2013, he delivered the keynote speech at the ALI Annual Dinner.

Frazier was a member of President Trump's American Manufacturing Council. He resigned from the Council on August 14, 2017, following the violent 2017 Unite the Right rally in Virginia. In a statement, Frazier said that he objected to Trump's statement that "many sides" were responsible for violence. Frazier stated, "America's leaders must honor our fundamental views by clearly rejecting expressions of hatred, bigotry and group supremacy, which run counter to the American ideal that all people are created equal."

On June 1, 2020, Frazier gave an interview with CNBC Squawk Box addressing racial tensions and violence following the murder of George Floyd, an unarmed black man who was murdered by the Minneapolis police. In the interview, he mentioned that it could have been him in that situation.

In August 2020, Kenneth Frazier and his wife, Andréa Frazier donated $5 million to Jefferson Health to work with Temple University on a new stroke initiative targeting African-American communities.

== See also ==
- Merck & Company
- Raymond Gilmartin
- Richard Clark
- George W. Merck
- Roy Vagellos
