= Acceleron Pharma =

American healthcare company

Acceleron Pharma, Inc.
- Company type: Subsidiary
- Traded as: Nasdaq: XLRN
- Industry: Biotechnology
- Founded: 2003; 23 years ago
- Headquarters: Cambridge, Massachusetts, United States
- Key people: Habib Dable (CEO); Steve Ertel (COO); Matt Sherman (CMO); Kevin McLaughlin (CFO); Francois Nader (chairman)
- Revenue: ▲$74.5 million for FY2017
- Number of employees: 225 (Dec 2019)
- Parent: Merck & Co.
- Website: acceleronpharma.com
- Footnotes / references Key People

Acceleron Pharma, Inc. is an American clinical stage biopharmaceutical company based in Cambridge, Massachusetts with a broad focus on developing medicines that regulate the transforming growth factor beta (TGF-β) superfamily of proteins, which play fundamental roles in the growth and repair of cells and tissues such as red blood cells, muscle, bone, and blood vessels.

== Pipeline ==
Acceleron has four drugs in clinical trials, and one in preclinical development.

- Luspatercept (ACE-536) for anemia
- Sotatercept (ACE-011) for pulmonary arterial hypertension
- Dalantercept (ACE-041) for kidney cancer
- ACE-083 for muscular disorders

== History ==
The company was formed in June 2003 in Cambridge, Massachusetts as a Delaware corporation; the original name was Phoenix Pharma.

The founders were scientists Jasbir Seehra, Tom Maniatis, Mark Ptashne, Wylie Vale, and scientific advisor Joan Massague, and business people and investors John Knopf, Larry Bock and Christoph Westphal of Polaris Venture Partners, who served as founding CEO. The company was founded to discover and develop drugs based on the scientific discoveries of the scientific founders in the field of growth factors and transforming growth factors in the fields of metabolic disorders like obesity, diabetes, osteoporosis, and muscle-wasting conditions.

The company began with a seed round from Polaris of $250,000 and then had a Series A venture capital investment of $25 million that it used to open its first laboratory in December 2003.

Glenn Batchelder was appointed president and CEO in June 2004.

It started its first clinical trial in June 2006; the product was ACE-011 (which eventually was named "sotatercept"), a protein therapeutic that was an activin type 2 receptor antagonist intended to treat bone loss. ACE-011 was a chimeric protein, created by fusing the binding portion of the activin type 2 receptors to part of an antibody; the resulting protein binds to activin and prevents it from acting.

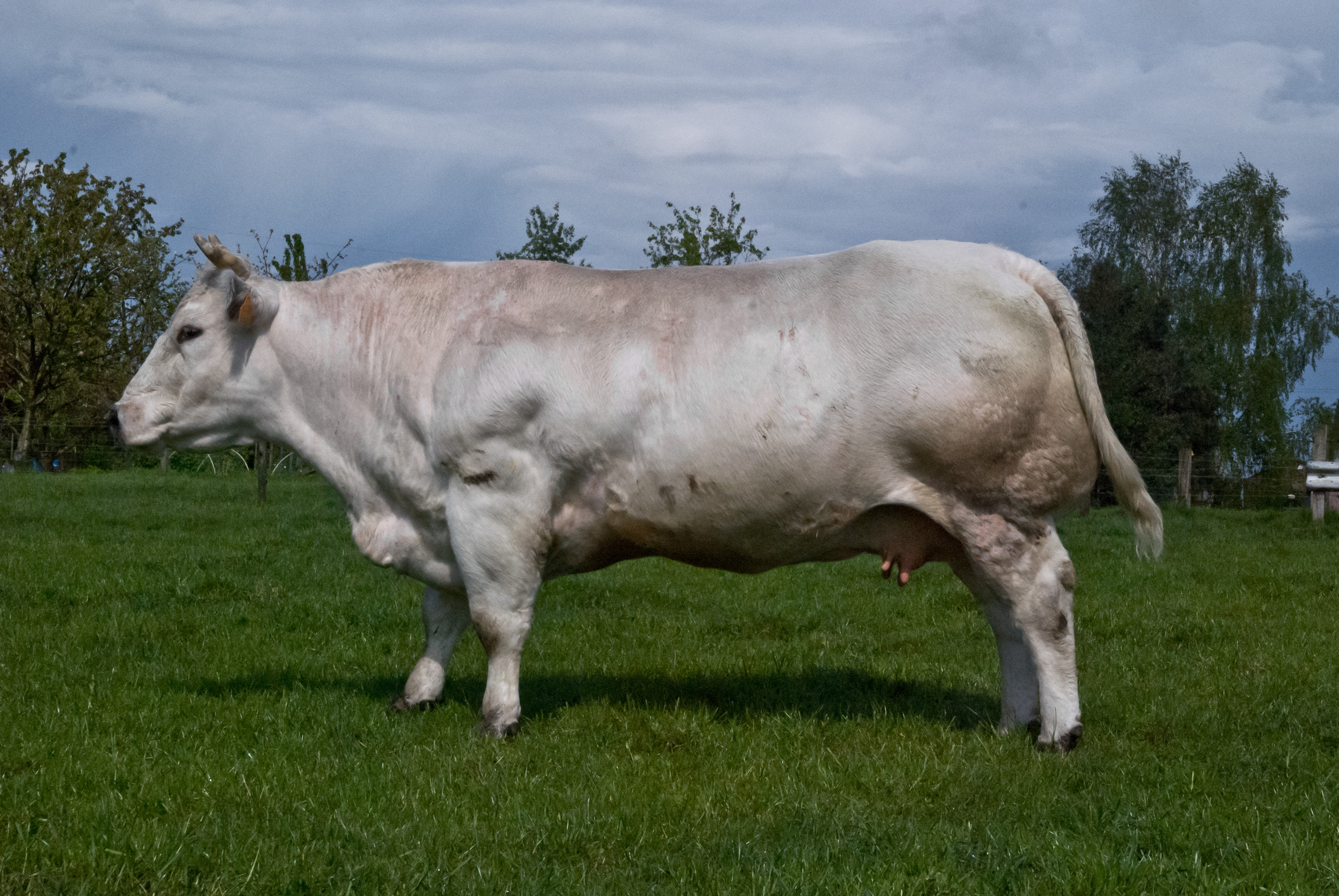
A muscular Belgian Blue cow

Knopf took over as CEO in 2007. He became known for showing pictures of a Belgian Blue cow to potential inventors, as a way of illustrating the company's products' potential to develop muscle.

In 2008, Acceleron and Celgene started a partnership to jointly develop and market ACE-011 in which Celgene paid Acceleron $50 million up front and bought $5 million of Acceleron stock, and agreed to buy $7 million more in stock if Acceleron went public, and agreed to pay up to $510 million in milestones. In a separate deal done at the same time, Celgene acquired an option to license three products in Acceleron's pipeline directed to cancer and cancer-related bone loss.

In 2011, Acceleron extended their partnership with Celgene to include ACE-536, a development candidate for anemia; Celgene paid $25 million upfront, with potential downstream payments of $217 million in milestones and royalties over 10%.

The company held its initial public offering in September 2013. At that time, the company had three protein therapeutic candidates being studied in 12 Phase 2 clinical trials, including sotatercept and luspatercept (ACE-536) which promoted red blood cell production and were being tested as potential treatments for anemia in people with thalassemia and myelodysplastic syndromes (MDS); its other candidate was dalantercept (ACE-041), an angiogenesis inhibitor as a potential cancer drug.

In September 2016, Knopf retired, and the company hired Habib Dable as CEO; at that time, the company's lead product luspatercept was in Phase III testing for MDS and beta-thalassemia.

Acceleron experienced a drop in its share prices in 2019, after announcing that it will discontinue the development of an experimental drug meant to treat the rare genetic disease called facioscapulohumeral muscular dystrophy. The termination of the drug's development has been partly due to shareholders' concerns regarding the costs associated with it.

In September 2021, Merck & Co. announced it would acquire Acceleron for $11.5 billion, gaining control over Sotatercept, used in the treatment of pulmonary hypertension and luspatercept-aamt. The acquisition closed on November 19, 2021, making Acceleron a subsidiary of Merck.

In October 2022, Merck & Co. announced the results from a Phase III trial evaluating sotatercept.
