= Blausen Medical =

Blausen Medical Communications
- Type: Private
- Industry: Healthcare technology education
- Founded: 1991
- Headquarters: Houston, United States
- Key people: Bruce Blausen (Founder and CEO); Ashley Bruce (COO); Gordon Lewis (CFO)
- Products: 3D medical and scientific animations
- Website: http://www.blausen.com/home

Blausen Medical Communications, Inc. (BMC) is the creator and owner of a library of two- and three-dimensional medical and scientific images and animations, a developer of information technology allowing access to that content, and a business focused on licensing and distributing the content. It was founded by Bruce Blausen in Houston, Texas, in 1991, and is privately held.

== Background ==
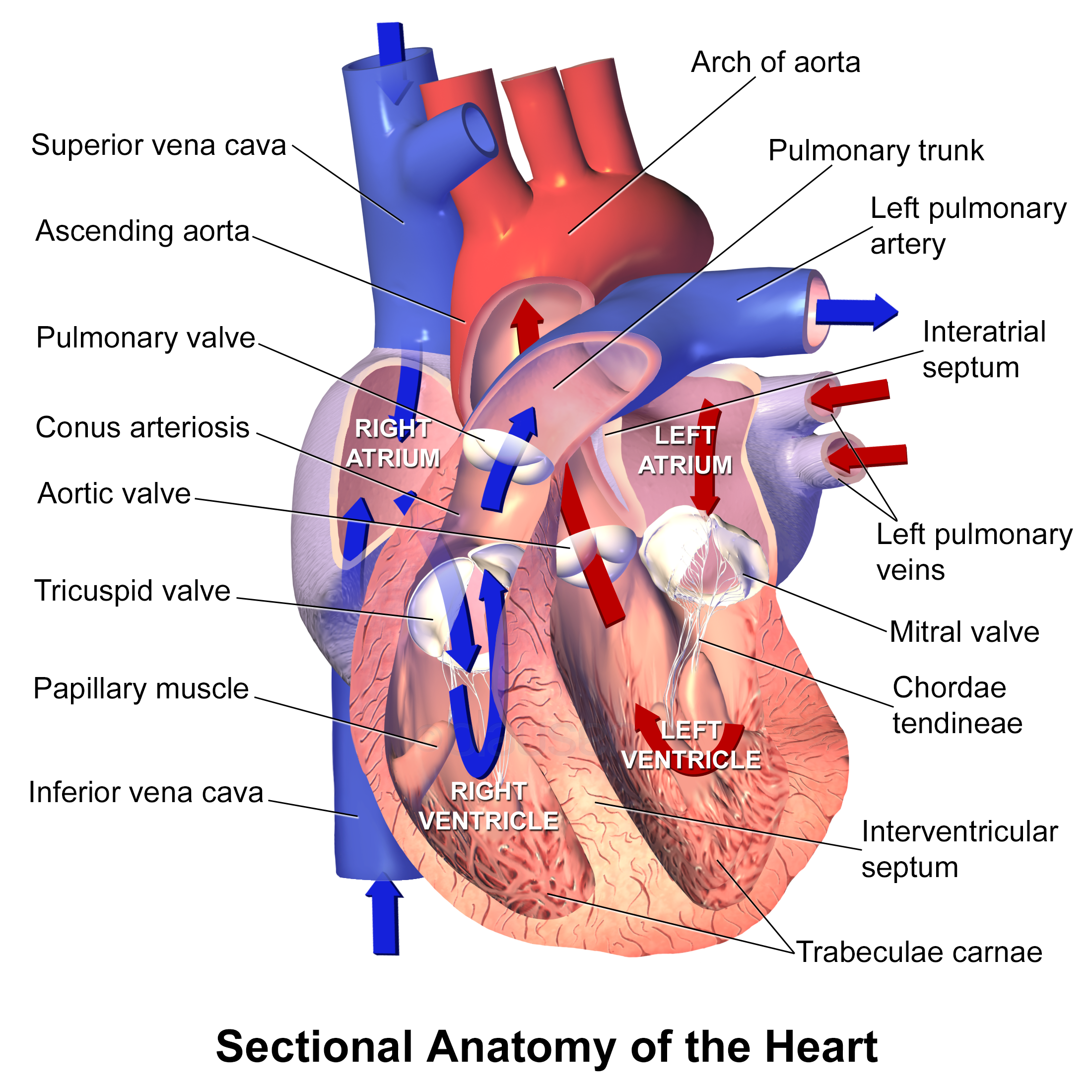
Example illustration by Blausen Medical showing the anatomy of the heart.

Blausen Medical Communications is a privately held company founded by Bruce Blausen in Houston, Texas in 1991. BMC created and owns a library of medical and scientific images and animations, and has developed information technology tools allowing access to the library; as well, it licenses and otherwise works to distribute the content.

As of this date, BMC's animation library comprised approximately 1,500 animations and over 27,000 two- and three-dimensional images designed for point-of-care patient education, which could be accessed by consumers or professional caregivers (primarily via hospital or healthcare portal websites). The company first packaged a number of animations and still images integrated within a functional dashboard player, sold as the Blausen Human Atlas.

In 2014, BMC released 266 of their images under a creative commons license, allowing for their free use.

The company has released the Blausen It web extension as an app to allows users to access Blausen 3D animations without visiting the company's website; clicking on the free app's icon in a web browser initiates a scan of the online text being viewed, resulting in highlight terms with icons that link to the company's educational animations.

== Content provider relationships ==
BMC has entered into a number of business relationships resulting in its content being featured by other business entities. These include the use of its illustrations by the consumer and professional versions of the Merck Manual, and the integration of BMC Human Atlas health literacy videos with VUCA Health content in the Remote Care Management products of Vivify Health (announced February 2015).

== Awards and recognition ==
Blausen Medical Communications was awarded the Innovations in Healthcare 2011 ABBY Award in Healthcare IT and Telecom Technology (Business Facing) in 2011, for the company's Human Atlas App for iPhone and iPad.

In addition, BMC was recognized in November 2011 with Platinum eHealthcare Leadership Awards for Best Web 2.0 and for Best Mobile Communications for its presence on the web and with a Bronze Web Health Award for its Human Atlas iPad app.
