= James Willie "Bo" Cochran =

American victim of wrongful conviction

Willie James "Bo" Cochran
- Born: November 29, 1942; Lee County, Alabama, U.S.
- Died: July 12, 2016 (aged 73); Alabama, U.S.
- Occupation: Activist
- Known for: Being wrongfully convicted of murder

James Willie "Bo" Cochran (November 29, 1942 - July 12, 2016) was an African-American man from Bessemer, Alabama, who is known for his false conviction and later acquittal as a part of a robbery and murder of a store clerk in Jefferson County, Alabama. Cochran was sentenced to death and held on the state's death row for 19 years before finally being released in 1997. Cochran is also notable for appearances in media such as “Death in Dixie” as well as numerous interviews with well-known attorney Richard S. Jaffe, who was a part of the team that freed Cochran. This team also included another well-known lawyer in Kenneth Frazier.

That Cochran robbed the store of the victim is undisputed. However, at his retrial in 1997, he was only found guilty of robbery and released on time served. His lawyers presented evidence that the victim had been killed by the police, who had mistaken him for the robber. After realizing their mistake, the police had panicked and blamed the victim's death on Cochran.

== Early life ==
Cochran was born in Lee County, Alabama. In 1961, he was convicted of second degree murder.

== Murder of Stephen Jerome Ganey ==
Around 10 PM on November 4, 1976, James Willie Cochran robbed the A&P Grocery Store in Jefferson County, Alabama, demanding all the money from the store safe and cash registers be placed in a grocery sack. At the time of the robbery, an assistant manager, a store clerk, and several customers were inside the store.

Stephen Jerome Ganey, the store's assistant manager, followed Cochran out of the store, which Cochran noticed. As Cochran ran from the store, he and Ganey engaged in a ‘stop and go’ motion, where they would run briefly before Cochran would stop, point a gun at Ganey, and then continue to run.

Shortly after the robbery, police quickly surrounded the area around the A&P looking for Cochran. Within twenty minutes of police arriving, a gunshot was heard. Soon after the gunshot, police found Cochran within a half-mile of the store. Cochran was seized with $250 with an A&P band wrapped around it, and he had just tossed away a revolver.

Later that night, Stephen Jerome Ganey's body was found under a trailer in a nearby mobile home park. There were no eyewitnesses to the actual murder of Ganey.

== Trial and sentencing ==
In August 1977, Cochran was initially tried for capital murder. Before trial, Cochran filed a "motion to restrict prosecutorial strikes" which requested that "the District Attorney and his staff be restricted from using their peremptory strikes in a racially biased manner." The motion was denied.

In 1977, Cochran filed a “challenge to composition of petit jury” alleging the systematic exclusion of blacks from the jury rolls. This motion was denied, stating: "Motion is overruled. Should defendant wish to take testimony on the motion, the Court will reconsider this ruling." No evidence was presented in support of the motion and no objection raised to the prosecution's use of its peremptory challenges during jury selection. This case ended in a mistrial.

Cochran was reindicted in 1977, following which he was retried and convicted of capital murder in February 1978 and sentenced in March 1978. On March 31, 1981, that conviction and sentence were reversed on procedural grounds on authority of Beck v. Alabama, 447 U.S. 625, 100 S.Ct. 2382, 65 L.Ed.2d 392 (1980), and Beck v. State, 396 So.2d 645 (Ala.1980).

In 1982, Cochran was tried again in Jefferson County for the murder of Ganey. The venire panel for this trial consisted of forty-two potential jurors, nine of whom were black. Following the voir dire stage of jury selection, Cochran made “motion to restrict prosecutorial strikes” to prohibit the prosecution from striking jurors based on race. The motion was denied; however, the court stated that it would be guided by Swain v. Alabama, in determining whether the State was appropriately using its peremptory strikes.

During jury selection, the prosecution used seven of its fourteen peremptory challenges to exclude seven of the nine black members of the venire panel. Cochran's counsel did not object, meaning the final jury was selected, and the final jury of eleven whites and one black found Cochran guilty of murder, following which he was sentenced to death. With this, Cochran was convicted of the capital murder of Ganey and sentenced to death.

Cochran appealed his conviction and sentence in state court. the conviction and sentence were ultimately affirmed on appeal.

Cochran appealed to the Alabama Supreme Court which ruled remanding the case to the trial court for resentencing based on failure to address mitigating circumstances in the decision. The trial resentenced Cochran in February 1986, found no mitigating circumstances, and again sentenced him to death.

Following resentencing by the trial court, Cochran appealed the ruling to the Alabama Court of Criminal Appeals. The Court of Criminal Appeals affirmed Cochran's sentence, and the Alabama Supreme Court affirmed that decision. The United States Supreme Court denied certiorari in Cochran's case.

In 1987, Cochran filed a petition for post-conviction relief, still without challenging the conviction under Batson. Cochran raised the Batson issue for the first time in 1988, when he filed an amendment to the State petition. The state circuit court ruled that the Batson claim was procedurally barred. The court also noted that the record did not contain any evidence of racial discrimination in the use of peremptory strikes. Cochran filed an objection to the trial court's findings, attaching to the objection copies of the jury list and the strike sheets After the trial court overruled the objection, Cochran appealed.

The Court of Criminal Appeals reviewed the jury list and strike sheets and concluded that they could not determine how many Black people were on the jury list, removed, or served on the jury. The court held that Cochran was procedurally barred from raising the Batson claim in a Rule 20 motion because he had not raised it on direct appeal.

After the Supreme Court denied Cochran's petitions for a writ of certiorari, Cochran petitioned the United States District Court for the Northern District of Alabama. The district court found that the evidence showed that the district attorney's office maintained a policy of striking black jurors due to race, applying it to Cochran's case. The district court granted Cochran relief on the Batson claim. Accordingly, the court granted Cochran's petition, ordering that he be freed from custody. This decision was affirmed on appeal by the Eleventh Circuit of the United States Court of Appeals.

At his retrial in 1997, Cochran was found guilty of robbery, but acquitted of capital murder and released on time served. His lawyers presented evidence that the victim had accidentally been killed by the police, who panicked and then blamed it on Cochran.

== Death row ==
Cochran was held on death row for nearly 19 years, being held at Holman Correctional Facility in Atmore, Alabama. During his time on death row, Cochran maintained his innocence, swearing that he did not fire his gun. At this time, Cochran also underwent a religious conversion, becoming a born-again Christian.
