= Sotatercept =

Medication used to treat pulmonary arterial hypertension

Clinical data
- Trade names: Winrevair
- Other names: ACE-011, MK-7962, sotatercept-csrk
- AHFS/Drugs.com: Monograph
- MedlinePlus: a624053
- License data: US DailyMed: Sotatercept
- Pregnancy category: AU: D
- Routes of administration: Subcutaneous
- ATC code: C02KX06 (WHO)

Legal status
- Legal status: AU: S4 (Prescription only); CA: ℞-only; US: ℞-only; EU: Rx-only

Identifiers
- CAS Number: 1001080-50-7
- DrugBank: DB12118
- UNII: 0QI90BTJ37
- KEGG: D09670

Chemical and physical data
- Formula: C_{3448}H_{5264}N_{920}O_{1058}S_{42}
- Molar mass: 77879.94 g·mol^{−1}

Sotatercept, sold under the brand name Winrevair, is a medication used to treat pulmonary arterial hypertension. It inhibits activin signaling using the extracellular domain of the activin type 2 receptor fused with an immunoglobulin Fc domain (ACTRIIA-Fc) as a recombinant fusion protein. It is administered via subcutaneous injection.

The most common side effects include headache, epistaxis (nosebleed), rash, telangiectasia (spider veins), diarrhea, dizziness, and erythema (redness of the skin).

Sotatercept was approved for medical use in the United States in March 2024, and in the European Union in August 2024. The US Food and Drug Administration considers it to be a first-in-class medication.

== Medical uses ==
In the United States, sotatercept is indicated for the treatment of adults with pulmonary arterial hypertension (WHO group 1 pulmonary hypertension) to improve exercise capacity and WHO functional class, and reduce the risk of clinical worsening events, including hospitalization for pulmonary arterial hypertension, lung transplantation and death.

In the European Union, in combination with other pulmonary arterial hypertension therapies, sotatercept is indicated for the treatment of pulmonary arterial hypertension in adults with WHO Functional Class II to IV, to improve exercise capacity.

== Side effects ==
Common side effects include headache, epistaxis (nosebleeds), rash, telangiectasia (spider veins), diarrhea, dizziness, and erythema (skin redness). Sotatercept increases hemoglobin levels, raising blood clot risk, and decreases platelet counts, potentially causing bleeding issues. Animal studies suggest it may impair fertility and cause fetal harm during pregnancy.

== History ==
The US Food and Drug Administration (FDA) approved sotatercept in March 2024, based on a trial of 323 participants with pulmonary arterial hypertension (WHO group 1, functional class II to IV) across 126 sites in 21 countries, including Argentina, Australia, and the United States. The study compared 163 participants on sotatercept to 160 on placebo, with 88 US participants (43 sotatercept, 45 placebo). The FDA granted the application for sotatercept breakthrough therapy designation.

In August 2024, sotatercept was authorized for medical use in the European Union.

== Society and culture ==
=== Economics ===
In 2024, Winrevair's US list price was $14,000 per vial, with an annual cost of approximately $240,000 (actual costs vary by dose, body weight, insurance, discounts, assistance programs, and country). Based on the CDA-AMC clinical review of the STELLAR trial, sotatercept yields an incremental cost-effectiveness ratio of $436,796 per QALY gained, with cost-effectiveness highly dependent on uncertain long-term survival benefits and requiring an approximately 95% price reduction to meet a $50,000 per QALY threshold.

=== Names ===
Sotatercept is the international nonproprietary name.

Sotatercept is sold under the brand name Winrevair.

== Research ==
Initially developed to increase bone density, sotatercept was found to increase hemoglobin and red blood cell counts, leading to studies for anemia in beta thalassemia and multiple myeloma. Anemia research later shifted to luspatercept (Reblozyl), a modified activin receptor type 2B (ACTRIIB-Fc) ligand trap with better anemia treatment properties. Hypothesizing that sotatercept could block activin-driven pulmonary vascular disease, researchers found it inhibited vascular obliteration in experimental pulmonary hypertension models, leading to its evaluation in the PULSAR and STELLAR trials for pulmonary arterial hypertension.
