= New Jersey Business and Industry Association =

American employer association

New Jersey Business & Industry Association
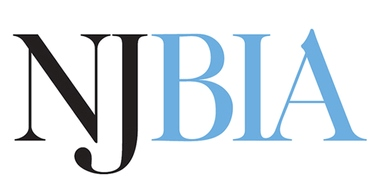
- Founded: 1910
- Purpose: Small Business Advocacy
- Location: Trenton, New Jersey
- Region served: New Jersey
- Key people: Michele Siekerka, President & CEO; Christopher Emigholz, Chief Government Affairs Officer; Bob Considine, CCO; Amy Densmore, Chief Strategy Officer; Enrico Smith, CFO; Wayne Staub, Chief Member Experience Officer; Heather Hansberry, Executive Assistant to the CEO
- Website: www.njbia.org

The New Jersey Business & Industry Association (NJBIA) is an employer association that provides information, services, and advocacy for its member companies. It is the nation's largest state employer association with 20,000 member companies, as of 2015.

== Origins and history ==
NJBIA was founded as the Manufacturers Association of the State of New Jersey in January 1910 by a group of 8 mill owners who wanted to share ideas about workplace safety. One of the chief concerns of the association's founding members was the Employer's Liability Act. In 1911, the association formed the New Jersey Manufacturers Insurance Liability Co., with the goal of providing for the medical care of injured workers, as well as giving employers steady rates and incentives to keep their workplaces safe.

In 1933 the association split into two separate, but closely affiliated, entities – New Jersey Manufacturers Insurance Company and the New Jersey Manufacturers Association. In the years following the Great Depression, the association began to focus its efforts on advisory services in addition to advocacy for businesses in government. The association's Industrial Relations Department was formed in 1946 to provide members with advice and information about state and federal regulations. Policy committees developed by the association in 1960 brought together members interested in specific policy areas and shaped the association's agenda.

In the mid 1970s the association changed its name to the New Jersey Business & Industry Association. The change came as the association evolved into its current form, with an increased focus on lobbying the state government in the interest of business owners.

Michele N. Siekerka became NJBIA's 11th President in 2014.

== Membership ==
NJBIA has 20,000 member businesses of all sizes, including large national corporations with branches or interest in New Jersey. A large percentage of the association's members are small businesses, with 80% of their members having 24 or fewer employees. The association's annual dues are determined by the number of full-time equivalent employees a member has working in New Jersey.

== Publications ==
NJBIA issues a number of print and digital publications. Its chief publication is New Jersey Business Magazine, which the association purchased in 1958. The monthly magazine focuses on business news, and is the largest and oldest circulation business magazine in the state.

== Events and awards ==
The association's annual New Good Neighbor Awards recognize industrial development projects, such as office buildings and shopping centers, in New Jersey. Winners are chosen based on economic benefit and job creation, architectural merit, and community involvement.

NJBIA's Awards for Excellence, presented since 1984, honor member companies for achievements in four areas; environmental quality, business success, outstanding employer, and public service.

Made in New Jersey Day, created by former association President Joe Gonzales, allows New Jersey manufacturers to showcase their products to lawmakers in the State House.
