= Richard Clark (business executive) =

Chairman of Merck Pharmaceutical Company

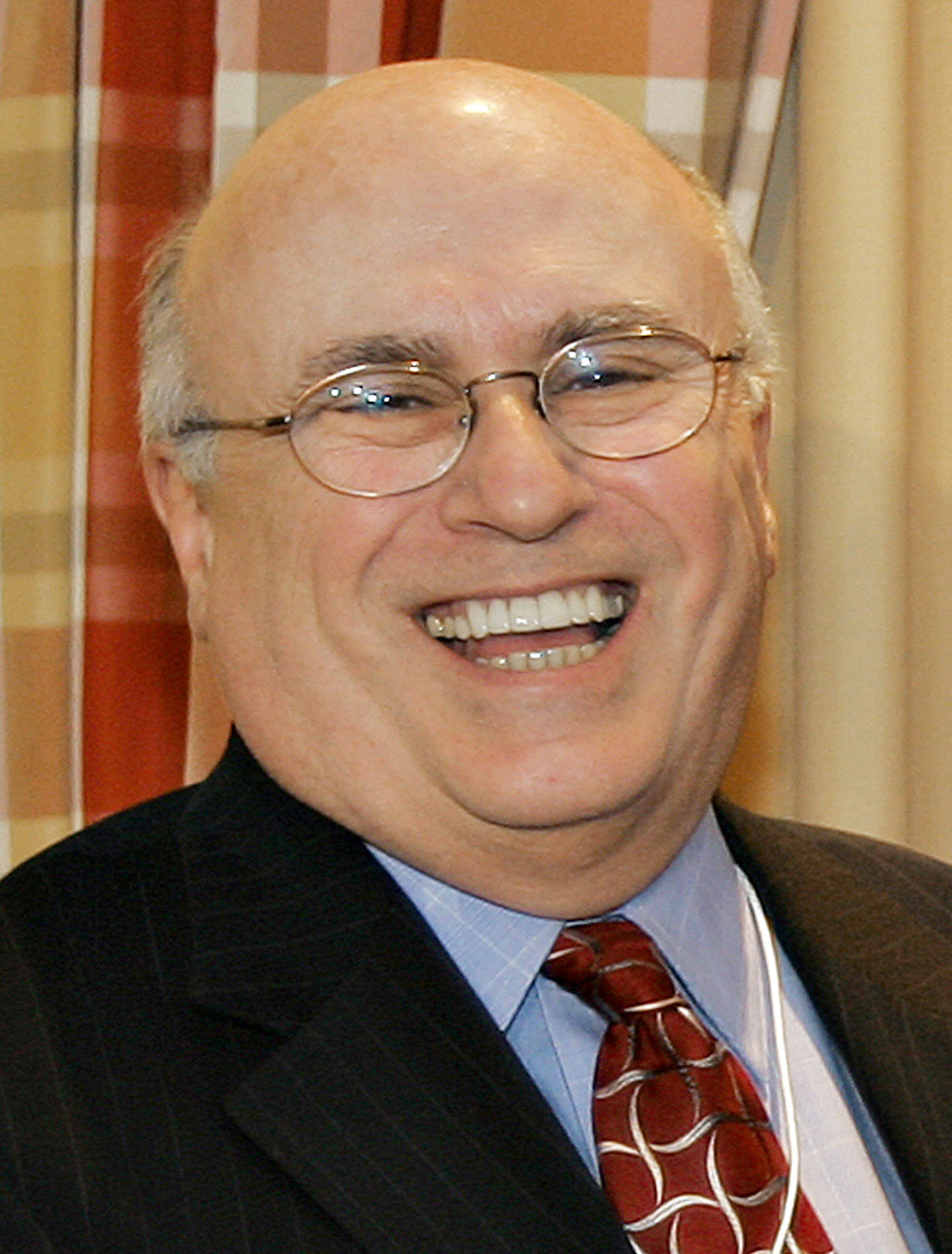
Richard Clark

Richard T. Clark is a former chairman of the Merck & Co. (MSD) pharmaceutical company, a position he held from 2007 to 2011. His previous leadership positions at Merck & Co. include CEO (2005–2010), president (2005–2009) and president of the Merck & Co. manufacturing division (2003–2005).

A first generation college student, he attended Washington & Jefferson College, where he majored in history and was a member of Lambda Chi Alpha.

He earned an MBA at the American University (1970) and was a lieutenant in the US Army 1970–1972. He joined Merck & Co. in 1972. He retired from the position of CEO in 2010 and retired as chairman in 2011.

He was on the Washington & Jefferson College board of trustees. He is also on the board of directors of Project HOPE and was chairman from 2010 to October 2018.

== Compensation ==
While CEO of Merck & Co. in 2008, Clark received a total compensation of $17,320,938, which included a base salary of $1,783,334, a cash bonus of $2,244,510, stocks granted of $6,811,125, options granted of $6,408,300 and other compensation of $73,669.
