= Merck Manual of Diagnosis and Therapy =

Medical textbook

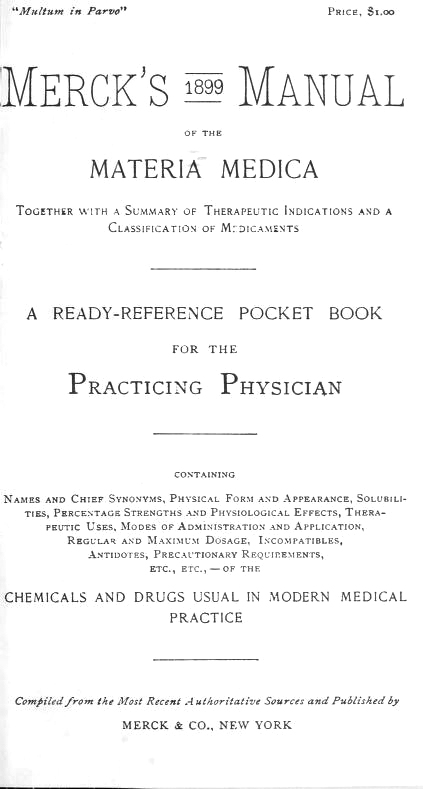
Coverpage of facsimile edition of 1899 Merck's Manual of the Materia Medica

The Merck Manual of Diagnosis and Therapy, referred to as The Merck Manual, is the world's best-selling medical textbook, and the oldest continuously published English language medical textbook. First published in 1899, the current print edition of the book, the 20th Edition, was published in 2018. In 2014, Merck decided to move The Merck Manual to digital-only, online publication, available in both professional and consumer versions; this decision was reversed in 2017, with the publication of the 20th edition the following year. The Merck Manual of Diagnosis and Therapy is one of several medical textbooks, collectively known as The Merck Manuals, which are published by Merck Publishing, a subsidiary of the pharmaceutical company Merck Co., Inc. in the United States and Canada, and MSD (as The MSD Manuals) in other countries in the world. Merck also formerly published The Merck Index, An Encyclopedia of Chemicals, Drugs, and Biologicals.

== History and editions ==
The first edition of The Merck Manual was published in 1899 by Merck & Co., Inc. for physicians and pharmacists and was titled Merck's Manual of the Materia Medica. The 192 page book which sold for US $1.00, was divided into three sections, Part I ("Materia Medica") was an alphabetical listing of all known compounds thought to be of therapeutic value with uses and doses; Part II ("Therapeutic Indications") was an alphabetical compendium of symptoms, signs, and diseases with a list of all known treatments; and Part III ("Classification of Medicaments (sic) According to their Physiologic Actions") was a listing of therapeutic agents according to their method of action or drug classification. Many of the terms used are now considered archaic, such as abasia, astasia, errhines and rubefacients - sternutatories, and many of the agents listed are now not considered to be standard therapeutic agents but were considered useful at the time, including poisonous compounds such as mercury, lead, strychnine and arsenic. There were 108 remedies listed for indigestion (dyspepsia), including alcohol, arsenic, cocaine, gold chloride, mercury, morphine, nux vomica, opium, silver nitrate, strychnine, and "Turkishbaths (for malaise after dining out)". Bismuth, calcium, magnesium salts were also on the list, which are ingredients found in many modern gastrointestinal treatments available today. Arsenic was recommended for over 100 illnesses including anemia, diarrhea, hydrophobia, elephantiasis, and impotence. The formulas include "aletris cordial", a "uterine tonic and restorative", which contained "aletris farinosa or True Unicorn combined with aromatics". The manufacturer, Rio Chemicals of St. Louis was clear to differentiate the inclusion of true unicorn rather than false unicorn in its preparation. (Note: The root of the Aletris farinosa is an alternative herbal remedy used as for digestive problems, and for relief of gynecologic disorders.)

The earliest versions did contain drugs that are still in use today for the same purposes, for example digitalis for heart failure;, salicylates for headache rheumatism and fever, nitroglycerin for cardiac angina pectoris;, and bismuth salicylate for diarrhea

Merck also began publishing Merck's Archives of the Materia Medica, a monthly journal consisting of papers related to drugs and uses, which was available for an annual subscription of US $1.00.

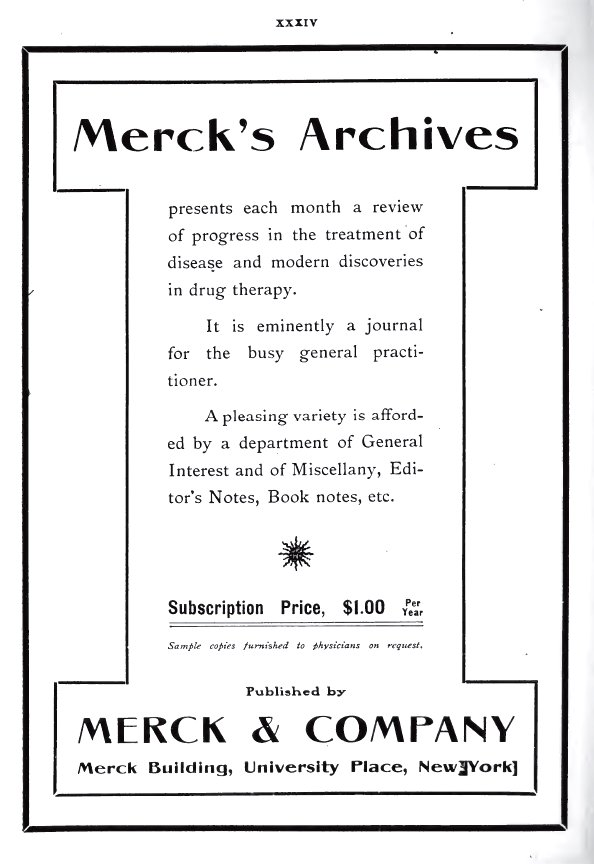
Ad for the January 1906 edition of the Merck's Archives

The second edition of The Merck Manual was published in 1901, was expanded to 282 pages and included new sections on poisons and antidotes, tables and conversion charts, and a detailed explanation of the metric system.

The 5th edition, published in 1923 was delayed due to paper shortages caused by World War I, and the release of the 6th edition was delayed until 1934 due to the Stock Market Crash. The editor of that edition, Dr. M. R. Dinkelspiel had overseen the growth and reorganization of the Manual to discuss specific diseases, diagnosis and treatment options, and external specialists reviewed each section. The 8th edition of the Manual was delayed by World War II until 1950. The 13th edition, released in 1977 was the first time the textbook was produced using magnetic tape and IBM punch cards, the previous version having been typed on a manual typewriter. The Centennial (17th) Edition published in 1999 included a separate facsimile version of the 1899 1st edition.

It is reported that both Admiral Richard E. Byrd took the book with him on his expedition to the South Pole in 1929 and Albert Schweitzer had a copy of The Merck Manual with him at his hospital mission in Africa in 1913.

The recommended doses given in Part 1 of 1901 edition of The Manual were for adults when given by mouth. It included the following dose adjustment recommendations:

The DOSES, unless otherwise stated, are for adults and per os. To determine the dose for children, add 12 to the age, and divide by the age; 1 divided by the result represents the fraction of the adult dose suitable for the child. For example, a child three years old will require
$$\text{pediatric dose:} = \frac{1}{\left ( \frac{(age)+12}{(age)}\right )}$$
$$\text{e.g.:} \tfrac {3+12}{3}= 5$$
$\tfrac{1}{5} = 0.2$ of the adult dose. Of powerful narcotics, children will require scarcely more than one-half of this proportion. Children bear opiates poorly; while they stand comparatively large doses of arsenic, belladonna, ipecac, mercurials, pilocarpine, rhubarb and some other purgatives, and squill. For hypodermic injection the dose is ordinarily about one-half of that given.

— Merck's Manual of the Materia Medica., 1901

=== Print editions of The Merck Manual ===
1. 1899
2. 1901
3. 1905
4. 1911
5. 1923
6. 1934
7. 1940
8. 1950
9. 1956
10. 1961 (There were two printings in 1961, June and Nov; a third in Aug 1962 and a fourth in June 1963)
11. 1966
12. 1972
13. 1977
14. 1982
15. 1984
16. 1992 (2 million copies sold)
17. 1999 (Centennial Edition)
18. 2006
19. 2011
20. 2018 (current print edition)

== Content ==
The Merck Manual is organized, like many internal medicine textbooks, into organ systems (see List of Medical Topics below) which discuss each major diseases of that system, covering diagnosis (signs, symptoms, tests), prognosis and treatment. It provides a comprehensive yet concise compendium of medical knowledge into about 3500 pages, by emphasizing practical information of use to a practicing physician. In addition to 24 sections covering medical topics, it includes a pharmacology section listing drugs by generic and brand name, a list of drug interactions and a pill identifier, a News and Commentary section, videos on procedures and examination techniques, quizzes and case histories, clinical calculators, conversion tables and other resources. The text is characterized by the combination of conciseness, completeness, and being up-to-date. It is updated continuously by an independent editorial board and over 300 peer reviewers that contribute to the textbook, which goes through an average of 10 revisions by both internal and external reviewers before publication. The internal editorial staff consists of 4 physician reviews, one executive editor and four non-medical lay editors. The latest version has been translated into 17 languages. In addition to the online version, The Merck Manual Professional Edition is also available as a mobile app in both iOS and Android platforms, produced by Unbound Medicine, Inc.

=== Medical topic sections (online edition) ===
K1. Cardiovascular Disorders 2. Clinical Pharmacology 3. Critical Care Medicine 4. Dental Disorders 5. Dermatological Disorders 6. Ear, Nose, and Throat Disorders 7. Endocrine and Metabolic Disorders 8. Eye Disorders 9. Gastrointestinal Disorders 10. Genitourinary Disorders 11. Geriatrics 12. Gynecology and Obstetrics 13. Hematology and Oncology 14. Hepatic and Biliary Disorders 15. Immunology; Allergic Disorders 16. Infectious Diseases 17. Injuries; Poisoning 18. Musculoskeletal and Connective Tissue Disorders 19. Neurologic Disorders 20. Nutritional Disorders 21. Pediatrics 22. Psychiatric Disorders 23. Pulmonary Disorders 24. Special Subjects

== Awards and recognition ==
The Merck Manual was listed in the 2003 Brandon Hill "Selected List of Books and Journals for the Small Medical Library" as a recommended medical textbook for diagnosis, geriatrics, and patient education.

The Merck Manuals were awarded five 2015 eHealthcare Leadership Awards including a Gold Award for Best Healthcare Content for Professionals, and a Distinction Award: Best Overall Healthcare Site, Consumer at the nineteenth annual Healthcare Internet Conference held in November 2015 in Orlando, Florida.

Merck Publishing offers resources for "The Merck Manual Award" provided annually to outstanding medical students. The qualifications for the award are determined by each medical school. Medical schools that give this award include University of North Carolina School of Medicine, University of Central Florida School of Medicine and the University of Illinois School of Medicine.

== Other Merck manuals ==
=== The Merck Manual of Geriatrics ===
First published in 1990, sections of The Merck Manual were made into a separate volume dealing with diseases and management of illnesses in the elderly. It has gone through three print editions, the last version published in 2000. Since the transition of The Merck Manual in 2015 to a web only based version, the Manual of Geriatrics is accessible through the Professional and Consumer portals of the online text. A search engine on the Merck Manual site allows searches limited to the contents of The Merck Manual of Geriatrics.

=== The Merck Manual of Patient Symptoms ===
The Merck Manual of Patient Symptoms is a concise, pocket size reference guide intended for medical students and allied health care professionals in training. It covers symptoms, diagnosis and treatment.

== Consumer editions ==
=== The Merck Manual of Medical Information – Home Edition ===
The Merck Manual of Medical Information – Home Edition was published in 1997 and was a re-edited version of the Professional version using less technical language intended for patients, caregivers and people interested in medical topics without training in health fields. This edition sold over 2 million copies. The Second Home Edition was released in 2003, and the third edition was published in 2009 as The Merck Manual Home Health Handbook, and sold over 4 million copies. Since 2015 the Consumer version content is available only via the online Merck Manual website. A condensed consumer-oriented version was published at The Merck Manual Go-To Home Guide for Symptoms in 2013.

=== The Merck Manual of Women's and Men's Health ===
In 2014, The Second Home Edition was extracted from the Professional version of The Manual and published as The Merck Manual of Women's and Men's Health

=== The Merck Manual of Health & Aging ===
A consumer version of The Merck Manual of Geriatrics was released in print in 2004 as The Merck Manual of Health & Aging, which included information on aging and the care of older people in non-technical language for the public. The content was incorporated into the Consumer version of the online Merck Manual in 2015.

== Veterinary medicine ==
=== The Merck Veterinary Manual ===
The Merck Veterinary Manual has been published since 1955 for professional veterinarians and other professionals in the veterinary field. It is the most widely used veterinary medicine textbook. It is still published in a print version and the 11th edition is scheduled for release on July 12, 2016. The Merck Veterinary Manual has been translated into seven languages, including Croatian, French, Italian, Japanese, Portuguese, Romanian and Spanish. It is also available as a mobile app in both iOS and Android platforms, as well as an online version.

=== Merck/Merial Manual for Pet Health (Home Edition) ===
A consumer version written in non-technical language as a joint publication between Merck and Merial released as the Merck/Merial Manual for Pet Health (Home Edition) was first published in 2007. ISBN 978-0911910995. A consumer oriented version of the Merck Veterinary Manual is available online as the Pet Health Edition.

== See also ==
- The Merck Index
