= New Jersey Business Magazine =

American magazine

- Categories: Business magazine
- Publisher: Vincent Schweikert
- Founded: 1954
- Country: United States
- Based in: Fairfield, New Jersey
- Language: English
- Website: NJB

Published by the New Jersey Business and Industry Association, New Jersey Business Magazine features editorials that spotlight businesses and covers state legislative issues affecting businesses in New Jersey. Published since 1954, it is the longest-standing business magazine in the Garden State.
