= Hilleman Laboratories =

Vaccine research organisation

- Formation: 2009
- Founders: Merck & Co., Inc. & Wellcome Trust
- Type: Vaccine Development
- Headquarters: 2021-present (Singapore) 2009-2020 (India)
- Key People: Mr. Sanat Chattopadhyay (Chairman) Dr. Raman Rao (CEO)
- Employees: 60 (2023)
- Website: hilleman-labs.org

Hilleman Laboratories is a Singapore-based vaccine research organisation. The firm is an equal-joint venture between US drug maker Merck & Co Inc and British charitable foundation Wellcome Trust. The research firm is named in honour of Dr. Maurice Ralph Hilleman (1919–2005).

== Activities ==
=== Vaccine research ===
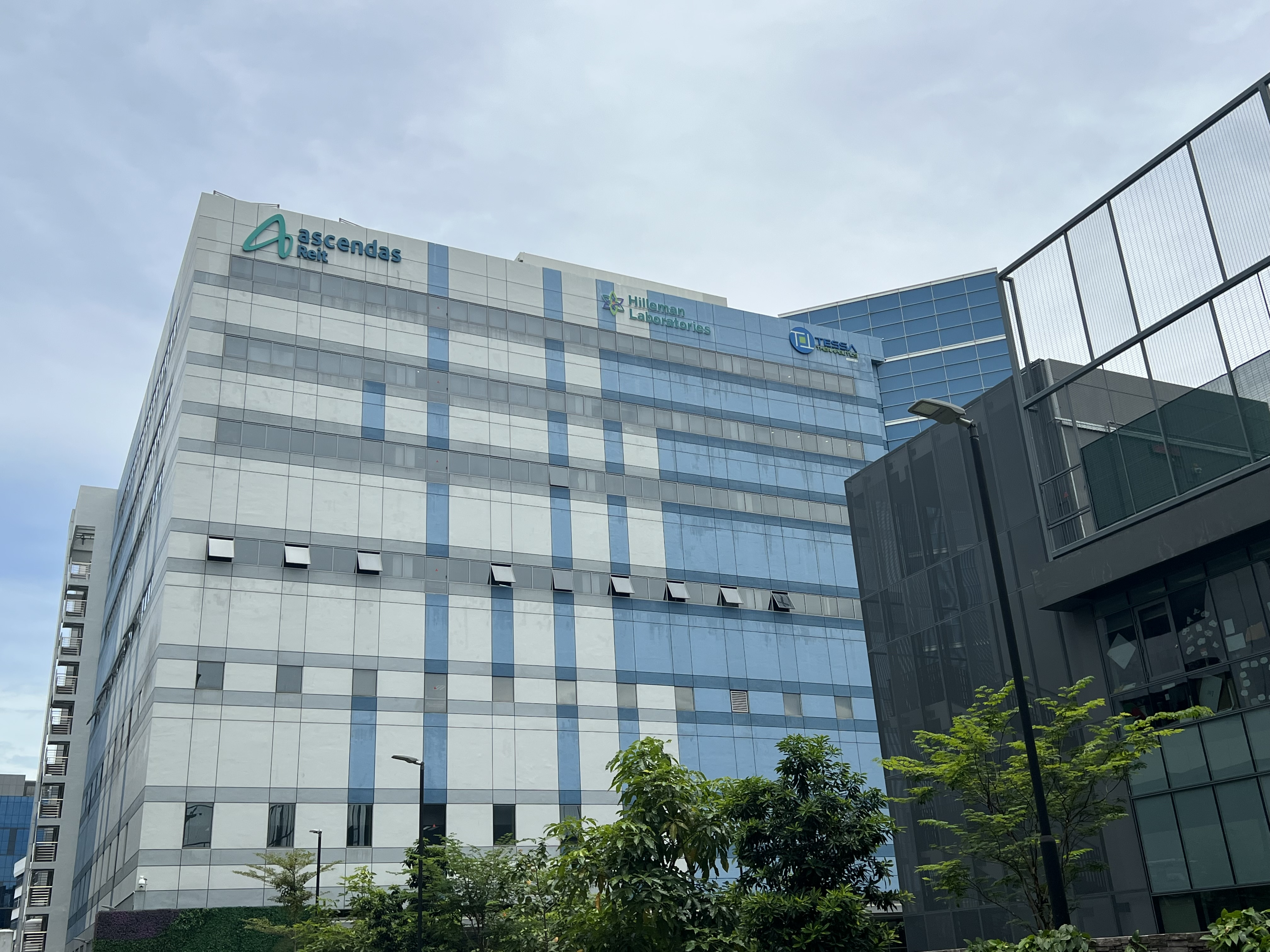
Hilleman Laboratories Singapore- ACES Pilot Manufacturing Facility

Hilleman Laboratories conducts various vaccine research and science programs to develop cost-effective vaccines especially for developing countries.

=== Vaccine programs ===
Hilleman Laboratories is involved in the development of both new vaccines for areas of unmet needs and optimizing existing vaccines. The firm establishes a portfolio of research projects based on disease priorities and technology opportunities that make a difference to vaccine development and programs in developing countries.

== Current projects ==
=== Heat-stable rotavirus vaccine ===
Hilleman Laboratories had announced a significant advancement in improving access to the lifesaving rotavirus vaccine for children, in April 2016. The vaccine candidate was stated to have optimized bulk antigen production processes combined with simple yet robust formulation and a scalable fill/finish to ensure a competitively priced vaccine which will improve access in the low-resource settings like India.

The firm's focus was to heat stabilize the existing vaccine and bring it to vaccine vial monitor (VVM) 30 levels and higher. This would determine the feasibility of applying latest delivery technologies to an existing oral rotavirus vaccine to make it thermostable for further opportunities.

=== Optimized cholera vaccine ===
Hilleman Laboratories, in collaboration with Gotovax AB (a University of Gothenburg spin-off biopharmaceutical company), is seeking to create highly effective oral cholera vaccines at a considerably lower price than existing ones available in the market. This vaccine is intended to be easy to use, with cross protection against enterotoxigenic Escherichia coli (ETEC) diarrhea and be optimized for a longer shelf life. It will be most favorable for geographies with the highest cholera burden, like Africa and South Asia.

=== Enterotoxigenic E. coli vaccine ===
Hilleman Laboratories, in association with the Wellcome Trust Sanger Institute, Cambridge, UK, has started an ETEC vaccine project to formulate an oral inactivated vaccine against ETEC diarrhea. The project involves generation of genetically modified vaccine strains that would highly express immunogenic antigens on their surface. This low-cost vaccine option will be most suited for regions with the highest cholera cases such as Africa and South Asia.

=== Low-cost MenACYWX conjugate meningococcal vaccine ===
Hilleman Laboratories has initiated a two-pronged strategy to develop low-cost combination vaccines for treatment of invasive meningococcal disease. It uses a newer method that makes use of synthetic organic chemistry to create short oligosaccharides. These oligosaccharides mimic the carbohydrate epitopes present in longer repeat units found in bacterial capsular polysaccharides. In addition, chemical linkers can be directly designed into the synthetic carbohydrates. This latest method has the potential to significantly reduce costs and create new intellectual property, allowing developing country manufacturers to undertake more conjugate vaccine development projects.

=== Shigella vaccine ===
Hilleman Laboratories has joined with Kolkata-based National Institute of Cholera and Enteric Diseases (NICED), an Indian Council of Medical Research (ICMR) organisation, to develop a vaccine against shigella, a bacterium that causes dysentery.

Currently, there is no approved vaccine available to prevent shigellosis. This bacterium is the second most deadly cause of diarrhea in children, after rotavirus.
