= Control of Communicable Diseases Manual =

1917 medical reference book

The Control of Communicable Diseases Manual (CCDM) is one of the most widely recognized reference volumes on the topic of infectious diseases. It is useful for physicians, epidemiologists, global travelers, emergency volunteers and all who have dealt with or might have to deal with public health issues.

The title of the book, as registered in the Library of Congress, is Control of Communicable Diseases Manual 20th edition, An Official Report of the American Public Health Association. The editor of CCDM is David L. Heymann, MD.

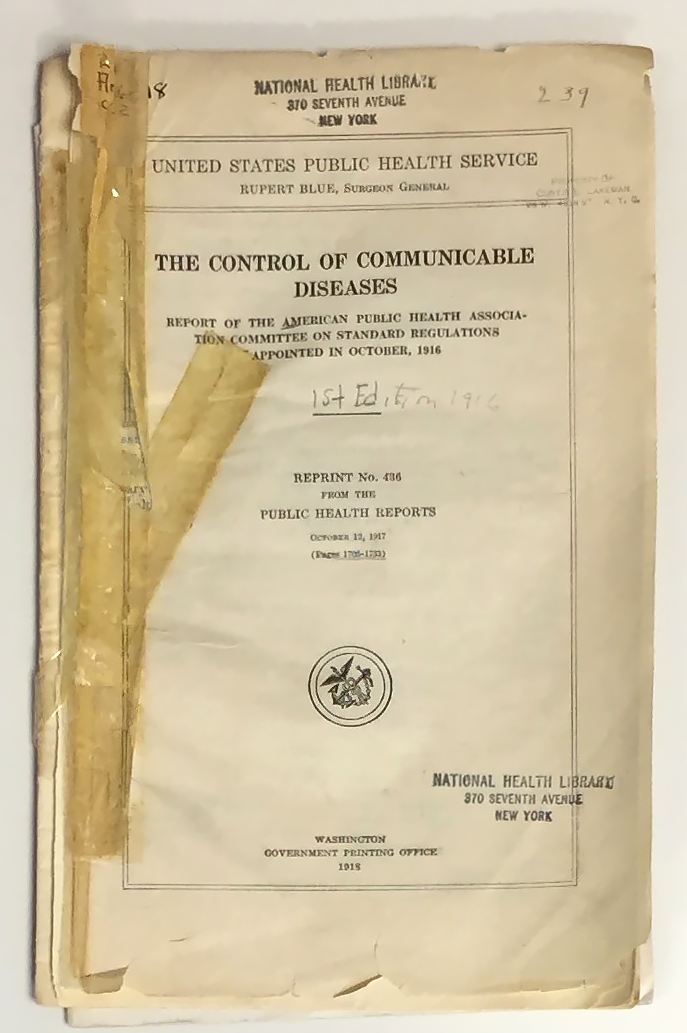
First edition (1917).

== History ==
The first edition, published in 1917 by the US Public Health Service, titled Control of Communicable Diseases. The first edition was a 30-page booklet with 38 diseases (Public Health Reports 32:41:1706-1733), adopted from a pamphlet written by Dr. Francis Curtis, health officer for Newton, Massachusetts, and sold for 5¢. Changes over the years reflect the new discoveries of infectious agents over the past century. The second edition in 1926 included 42 diseases, but only two arthropod (usually mosquito) - borne diseases, yellow and dengue fever and one protozoan disease, malaria. The causative organism of smallpox, dengue and chickenpox was listed as 'unknown.' The third edition in 1932 included two new arthropod infestations and a new disease, coccidioidal granuloma, with a note that it was 100% fatal. Eight diseases were listed as "reportable": diphtheria, epidemic influenza, measles, meningococcal meningitis, polio, scarlet fever, smallpox, and typhoid fever. The fourth edition in 1935 included 13 new infections. The fifth edition erroneously listed pemphigus as being infectious. In the sixth edition the rickettsioses were reorganized. In the seventh edition (1950) leprosy became Hansen's disease and cat-scratch disease was added as a probable viral disease (now known to be caused by the bacterium, Bartonella henselae. The eighth edition (1955) erroneously listed actinomycosis as a fungal disease. In the ninth edition, arthropod-borne viral diseases were reclassified, with 49 additional diseases, resulting in substantially more viral entries. By the twelfth edition (1975) there were 118 arboviral illnesses. The 16th edition included "neoplastic, malignant viral-associated diseases" for the first time. In 2004 (18th edition) there were six "tick-borne" diseases, which was later corrected to include a "mite-borne" disease, rickettsialpox. The title was changed to "Control of Communicable Disease Manual" in 1995 (16th edition) to remove any perception of gender bias.

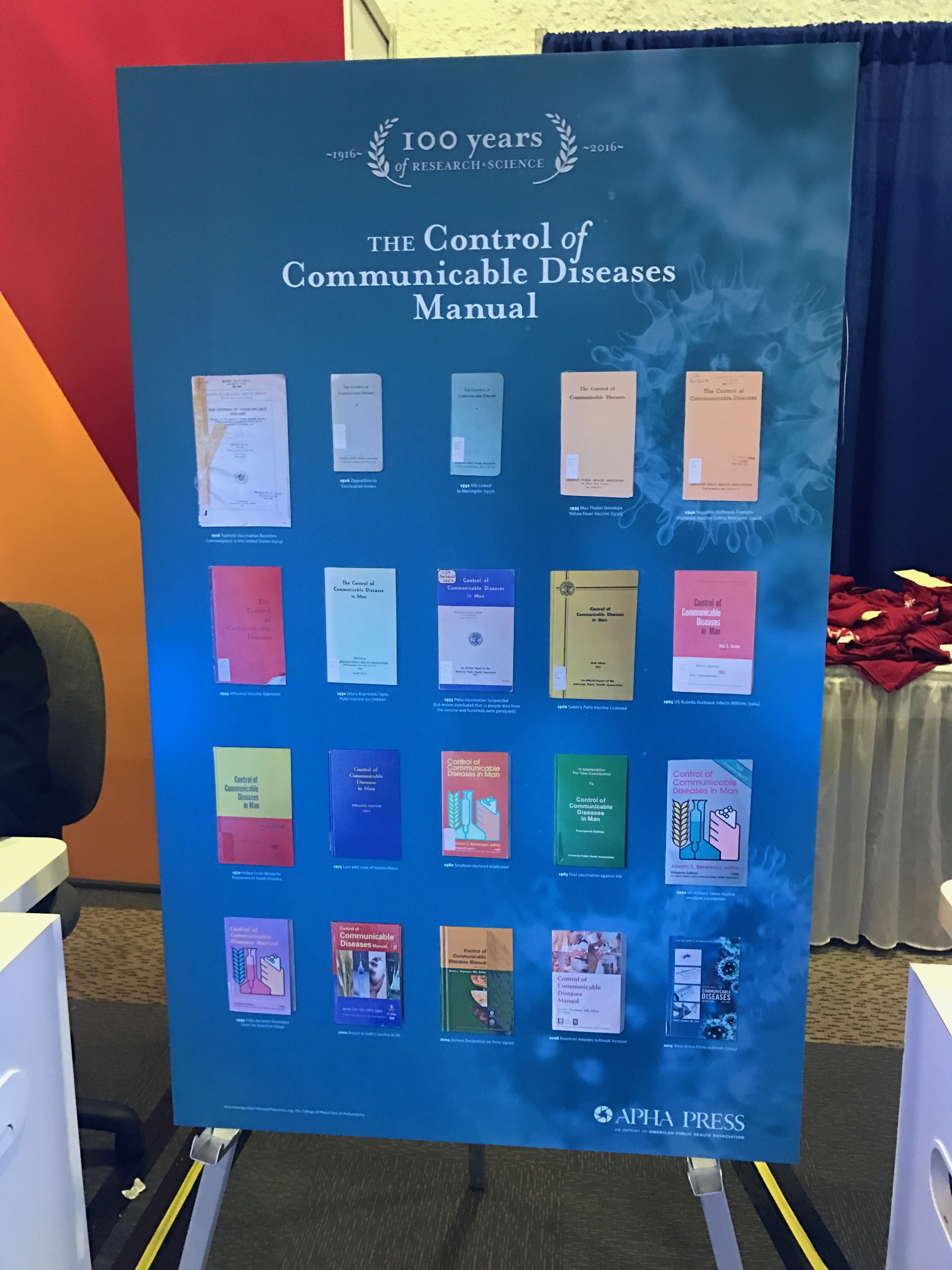
Poster of past and present CCDM covers at APHA convention 2016

For a long time the paperback edition was a handy pocket book, the 17th edition still fitting in one hand or a pocket . Now, the softcover version can only fit in the largest pocket of a spacious winter coat. However, the entire contents are now available as an app for iOS and Android and in PDF format.

The paperback is 729 pages with dimensions of 1.5 x 4.2 x 7 inches. The ISBN is 978-0-87553-018-5.

=== Latest edition ===
The American Public Health Association published the 20th edition of the CCDM in 2014 under the editorship of David L. Heymann, MD. International infectious disease and public health experts, at both the Centers for Disease Control and Prevention and the World Health Organization, have updated this version.

The 20th edition includes two new chapters on noma and animal/human communicable diseases. New arboviral agents were added (Banna, Cache Valley, Iquitos, and the Me Tri virus, but the number of arboviruses and other pathogens also contracted, apparently to make the manual less encyclopedic. The previous edition had eleven new chapters on topics fundamental to a global public health landscape. Chapter topics include: risk management, public health security in a globalized world, international health regulations, reporting of communicable diseases, outbreak response in bioterrorism, communicable disease control in humanitarian emergencies and handling of infectious materials. Other new chapters offer guidance on disease control at mass gatherings, after natural disasters or in emergency situations.

== Content ==
The Control of Communicable Diseases Manual (CCDM) compiles comprehensive scientific data about communicable diseases, which significantly contribute to mortality and morbidity around the world. The CCDM emphasizes the epidemiological aspects of communicable diseases and provides information about their identification, reporting, control and prevention.

=== Disease Descriptions ===
The CCDM lists diseases in alphabetical order and includes information on each disease using the following 12 sections:

1. Clinical Features
2. Causative agent(s)
3. Diagnosis
4. Occurrence
5. Reservoir(s)
6. Incubation period
7. Transmission
8. Risk groups
9. Prevention
10. Management of patient
11. Management of contacts and the immediate environment
12. Special considerations

The size of each section varies considerably. For instance, the occurrence section for smallpox is less than a line long, since this disease is officially present only in the freezers of laboratories at the CDC in the United States and the Vector Institute in Russia.

== Availability ==
The book has been published in a number of languages, including Arabic, Catalan, French, Italian, Japanese, Portuguese, Serbo-Croatian, Spanish, and Thai, a testament to its global audience.

The CCDM is available as an online PDF version and as apps for iOS and Android for $50.
