= Merck Index =

Index of chemicals

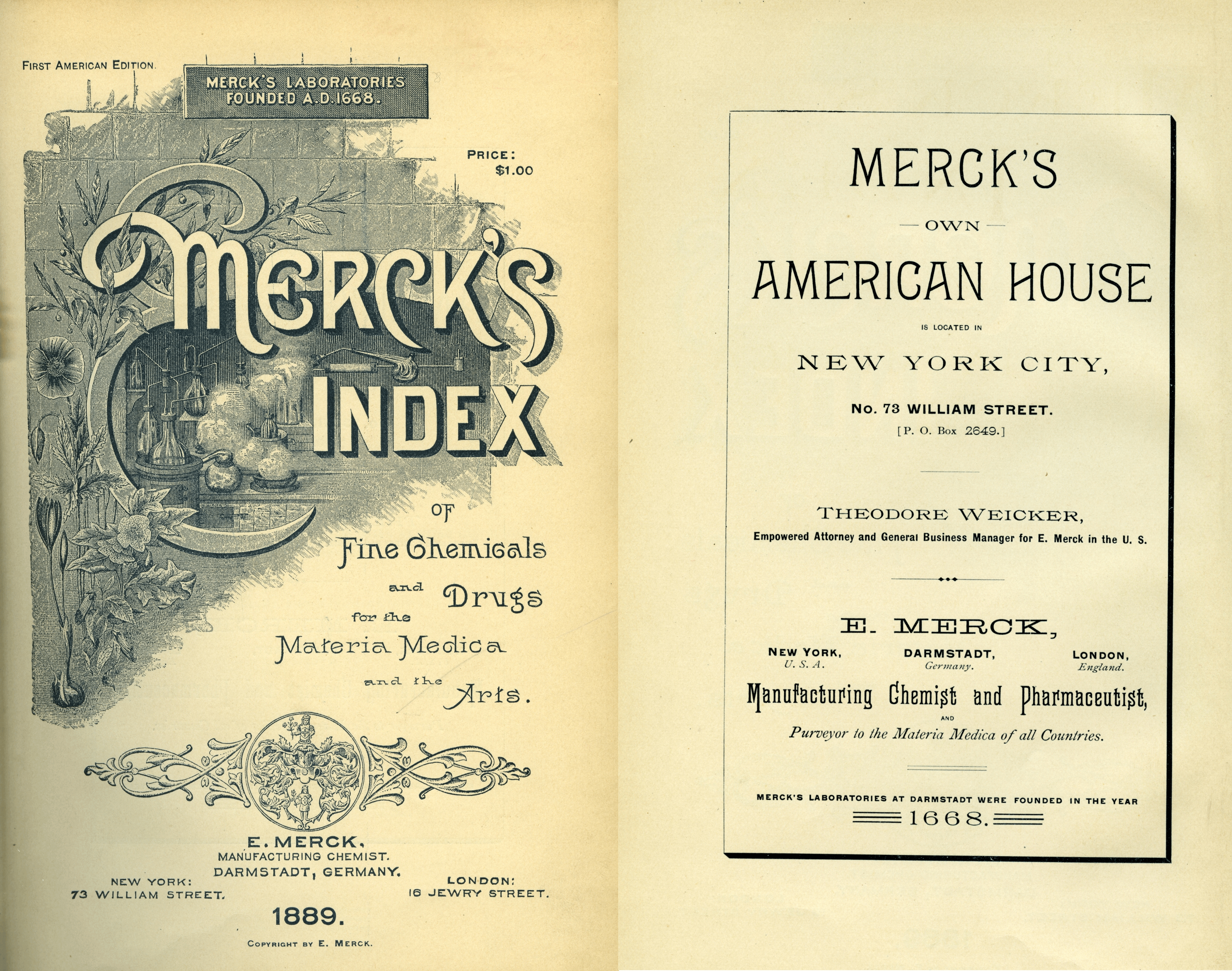
First issue, titled Merck's Index

The Merck Index is an encyclopedia of chemicals, drugs and biologicals with over 10,000 monographs on single substances or groups of related compounds published online by the Royal Society of Chemistry.

== History ==
The NFL edition of the Merck's Index was published in 1889 by the German chemical company Emanuel Merck and was primarily used as a sales catalog for Merck's growing list of chemicals it sold. The American subsidiary was established two years later and continued to publish it. During World War I the US government seized Merck's US operations Merck & Co., forming a separate American company that continued to publish the Merck Index.

In 2012 the Merck Index was licensed to the Royal Society of Chemistry. An online version of The Merck Index, including historic records and new updates not in the print edition, is commonly available through research libraries. It also includes an appendix with monographs on organic named reactions.

The 15th edition was published in April 2013.

Monographs in The Merck Index typically contain:

- a CAS registry number
- synonyms of the substance, such as trivial names and International Union of Pure and Applied Chemistry nomenclature
- a chemical formula
- molecular weight
- percent composition
- a structural formula
- a description of the substance's appearance
- melting point and boiling point
- solubility in solvents commonly used in the laboratory
- citations to other literature regarding the compound's chemical synthesis
- a therapeutic category, if applicable
- caution and hazard information

== Editions ==
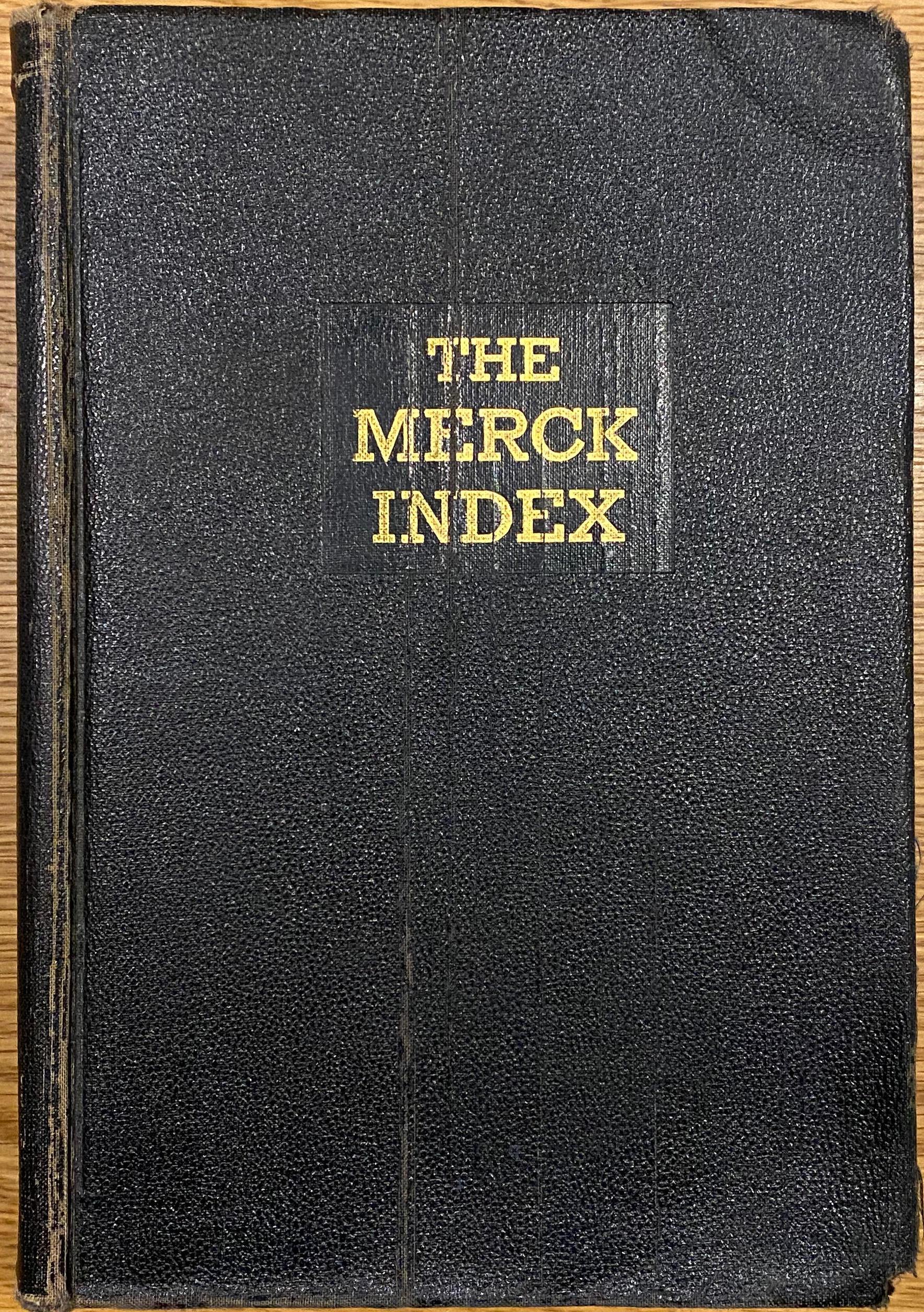
- A 5th edition copy owned by Professor Victor Trikojus
  1st (1889) – first edition released by E. Merck (Germany)
- 2nd (1896) – second edition released by Merck's American subsidiary and added medicines from the United States Pharmacopeia and National Formulary
- 3rd (1907)
- 4th (1930)
- 5th (1940)
- 6th (1952)
- 7th (1960) – first named editor is Merck chemist Paul G. Stecher
- 8th (1968) – editor Paul G. Stecher
- 9th (1976) – editor Martha Windholz, a Merck chemist
- 10th (1983), ISBN 0-911910-27-1 – editor Martha Windholz. In 1984 the Index became available online as well as printed.
- 11th (1989), ISBN 0-911910-28-X
- 12th (1996), ISBN 0-911910-12-3 – editor Susan Budavari, a Merck chemist
- 13th (2001), ISBN 0-911910-13-1 – editor Maryadele O'Neil, senior editor at Merck
- 14th (2006), ISBN 978-0-911910-00-1 – editor Maryadele O'Neil
- 15th (2013), ISBN 978-1-84973670-1 – editor Maryadele O'Neil; first edition under the Royal Society of Chemistry

== See also ==
- List of academic databases and search engines
- The Merck Manual of Diagnosis and Therapy
- The Merck Veterinary Manual
- Home Health and Pet Health
