= Merck =

Merck refers primarily to the German Merck family and three companies founded by the family, including:

- the Merck Group, a German chemical, pharmaceutical and life sciences company founded in 1668
  - Merck Serono (known as EMD Serono in the United States and Canada), a pharmaceutical company headquartered in Darmstadt, Germany, and a brand and division of Merck focused on biopharmaceuticals
- Merck & Co., Inc. (known as MSD (Merck Sharp & Dohme) outside North America), an American pharmaceutical company and a former subsidiary of the German Merck company, as founded in 1891/1917
- H. J. Merck & Co., a German bank founded in 1799

Merck may also refer to:

== People ==
- Carl Merck (1809–1880), Syndicus (foreign affairs head) of the Free City of Hamburg
- Ernst Merck (1811–1863), German businessman and politician
- George W. Merck (1894–1957), American president of Merck & Co.
- Heinrich Emanuel Merck (1794–1855), German apothecary whose descendants were the founders of Merck chemical companies
- Johann Heinrich Merck (1741–1791), German author and critic
- William Merck (1852–1925), British commissioner in India

== Publications ==
- Merck Manual of Diagnosis and Therapy, a medical textbook first published in 1899 by Merck & Co.
- Merck Index, a 1968 encyclopedia of chemistry, formerly published by Merck & Co. and now by the Royal Society of Chemistry
- Merck Veterinary Manual, a reference manual of animal health care published by Merck & Co. and Merial Limited

== Other ==
- Merck Finck & Co., a German private bank
- Johann-Heinrich-Merck-Preis, a literary prize of Hesse, Germany
- Merck Records, an IDM and experimental hip hop record label based in Miami, Florida, USA
- Merck-Saint-Liévin, a commune in the Pas-de-Calais department, France

== See also ==
- mIRC
- Merc (disambiguation)
- Merk (disambiguation)
