= Merckx =

- Pronunciation: Dutch: [mɛrks]
- Language: Dutch

Other names
- Variant forms: Merkus, Merks, Merx

Merckx is a Dutch patronymic surname, from the given name Merk or Merkus, a regional form of Mark and Marcus. While in Belgium the spelling Merckx is dominant, in the Netherlands the variants Merks, Merkus, Merkx, and Merx are more common. Notable people with the surname include:

== Merckx ==
- Axel Merckx (born 1972), Belgian racing cyclist, son of Eddy Merckx
- Eddy Merckx (born 1945), Belgian racing cyclist, widely seen as the most successful in history
- Eddy Merckx (billiards player) (born 1968), Belgian three-cushion billiards player
- Guillaume Merckx (1918–?), Belgian basketball player
- Jowan Merckx (born 1961), Belgian folk musician and recorder player
- Ken Merckx (born 1964), American television and voice actor
- Kris Merckx (born 1944), Belgian PVDA politician
- Sofie Merckx (born 1974), Belgian politician
- Trees Merckx-Van Goey (born 1951), Belgian politician and judge

== Merkus ==
- Hendrik Merkus de Kock (1779–1845), Dutch Navy general and nobleman
- Jeanne Merkus (1839–1897), Dutch social activist, philanthropist, and adventurer; daughter of Pieter Merkus
- Pieter Merkus (1787–1844), Dutch colonial administrator; Governor-General of the Dutch East Indies 1841–44
  - Named after him in 1845: Merkus pine (Pinus merkusii), a pine tree native to Sumatra

== Merkx ==
- Ryan Merkx (born 1992), Dutch basketball player

== Merx ==
- Adalbert Merx (1838–1909), German Protestant theologian and orientalist
- Peter Merx (born 1988), Dutch racing bicyclist

== See also ==
- Named after the cyclist Eddy Merckx:
  - Eddy Merckx Cycles, a Belgian brand of high-end road bikes
  - Eddy Merckx in the Vicinity of a Cup of Coffee, 1973 Danish experimental short film
  - Eddy Merckx metro station, a Brussels metro station
  - Grand Prix Eddy Merckx, a cycle race around Brussels
  - Les Fabuleux Exploits d'Eddy Merckx, a biographical comic
- Merk (disambiguation)
- Merck (disambiguation)
