= Katharine Evarts =

American politician (1898–2006)

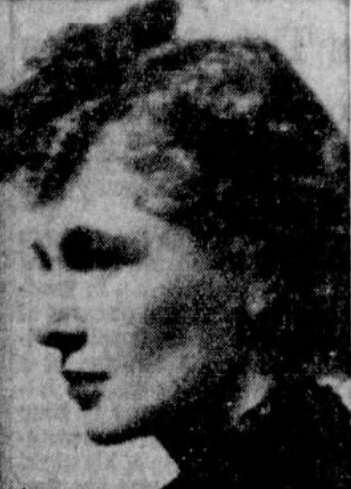

Member of the Connecticut House of Representatives from Kent
- In office 1959–1967
- Preceded by: Francis C. Cady
- Succeeded by: Seat eliminated

Personal details
- Born: Katharine Avery Morgan; October 29, 1898 Westbury, New York, U.S.
- Died: April 19, 2006 (aged 107)
- Party: Republican
- Spouse: Jeremiah Maxwell Evarts (divorced)
- Children: 5
- Parent(s): Elizabeth Mary Moran; Edwin D. Morgan III (1854–1933)
- Relatives: Edwin D. Morgan (great-grandfather)

Katharine Avery Evarts (née Morgan; October 29, 1898 – April 19, 2006) was an American politician who served in the Connecticut House of Representatives from 1959 to 1967, representing the town of Kent as a Republican.

== Personal life ==
Evarts was born Katharine Avery Morgan on October 29, 1898, in Westbury, New York, to parents Elizabeth Mary Moran and Edwin D. Morgan III, a prominent businessman and yachtsman. Evarts' paternal great-grandfather was Edwin D. Morgan, the 21st governor of New York.

As a child, Evarts attended the Brearley School in Manhattan, where she would later work as a teacher.

Evarts married Jeremiah Maxwell Evarts, the son of lawyer and politician Maxwell Evarts. Together, they owned Juniper Hill Farm in Windsor, Vermont, and had five children. On August 20, 1937, the couple divorced, and in 1941, Evarts and her children moved to Kent, Connecticut, where Evarts started her own farm and raised Guernsey dairy cows. In 1944, she sold Juniper Hill Farm.

Evarts' daughter Katharine Morgan Evarts married Albert W. Merck, a member of the Merck family, in 1946.

== Political career ==
Evarts was elected to the Connecticut House of Representatives in 1958, and she served four terms representing the town of Kent as a Republican. Evarts left office in 1967 and did not have a successor, as Connecticut's 1965 constitutional convention eliminated the use of town districts and replaced them with numbered, population-based districts.

== Death ==
Evarts died on April 19, 2006. She was 107.
