= Juniper Hill Farm-Maxwell Evarts House =

Historic house in Vermont, United States

- U.S. National Register of Historic Places
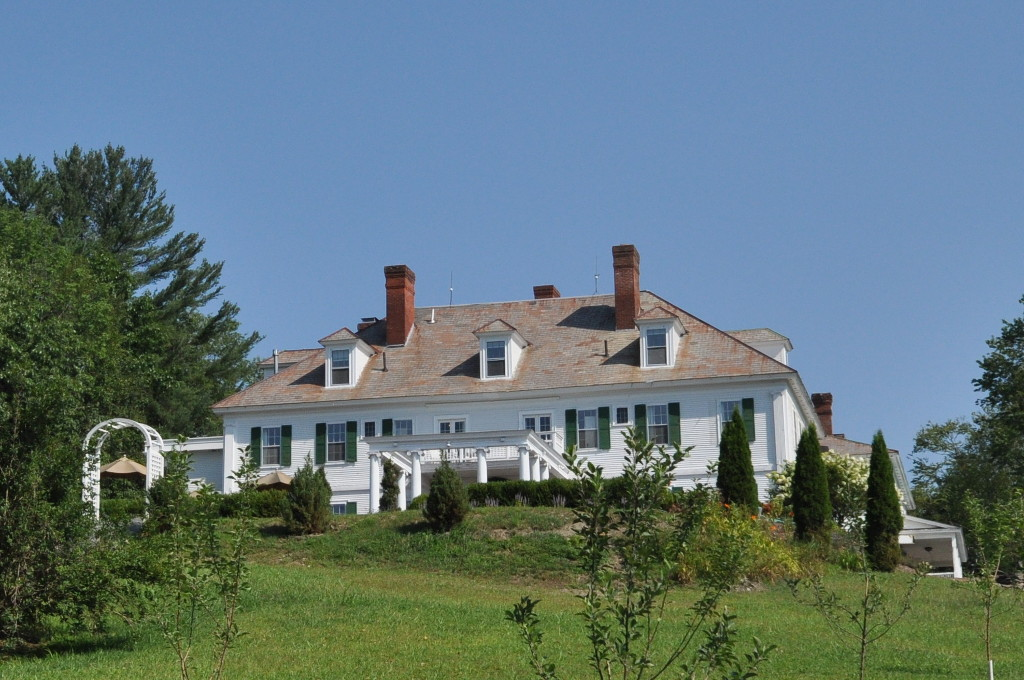

- Location within Vermont
- Location: Juniper Hill Rd., Windsor, Vermont
- Coordinates: 43°29′32″N 72°23′41″W
- Area: 14 acres (5.7 ha)
- Built: 1902
- Architect: Evarts, Maxwell; Ayers, Harvey
- Architectural style: Colonial Revival
- NRHP reference No.: 88001044
- Added to NRHP: July 14, 1988

Juniper Hill Farm, also known historically as Juniper Hill Inn and the Maxwell Evarts House, is a historic estate and mansion house on Juniper Hill Road in Windsor, Vermont. Built in 1902 by Maxwell Evarts, it is a large and elaborate example of Colonial Revival architecture. Evarts was a prominent New York lawyer, who played host to two presidents of the United States here. The property has seen a variety of commercial uses since the death of Evarts' son in 1936. In 2016, it reopened as the Windsor Mansion Inn with new owners. It was listed on the National Register of Historic Places in 1988.

== Description ==
Juniper Hill Farm stands atop the crest of a hill northwest of Windsor Vermont's main village and is accessed via a winding drive on the north side of Juniper Hill Road. The main house is a large U-shaped 2 1/2-story wood-frame structure, oriented with the open end of the U to the north, facing terraced landscaping. The central portion of the U is covered by a dormered hip roof, while the wings are only two stories in height, also covered by hip roofs. The original main entrance is at the center of the southern facade, sheltered by a small gabled portico; it has flanking sidelight windows and a semi-oval transom window. A portion of an open colonnade of fluted Doric columns (once extending across the entire facade and covered by an arbor trellis, all since removed) projects in front of the entrance. The interior retains many original features, including elegant woodwork, a butler's pantry with original cabinets, and a library with panelled walls and fine oak shelving.

== History ==
Maxwell Evarts was the son of William M. Evarts, a prominent lawyer notable for (among other accomplishments) his role in the impeachment of Andrew Johnson. The younger Evarts followed his father into the profession, also moving in high political circles due to his involvement with the Union Pacific Railroad. The Evarts family was also closely associated with sculptor Augustus St. Gaudens, whose summer studio (now a National Historic Site) was just across the Connecticut River in Cornish, New Hampshire. This house was built (apparently to designs by Maxwell Evarts) in 1902, on land that had been accumulated by the elder Evarts. Evarts made the estate his home until his death in 1913, playing host to Presidents Theodore Roosevelt and Woodrow Wilson in that time.

== Ownership ==
The property remained in the Evarts family until 1944, when it was sold to Mrs. Robert Edgar Cushman (née Katherine Vanderzee Ranney; 1907–1982) by Katharine Evarts (1898–2006), the ex-wife of Maxwell Evarts' son, Jeremiah Maxwell Evarts (1896–1985). In March 1961, Cushman sold the house, then known as the Juniper Hill Inn, to the American Northeastern Province of the Xaverian Brothers, Inc., of Boston to be used as a retreat for its members. The Xaverian Brothers ran it for 20 years as the Ryken Center. The Xaverian Brothers sold the property in 1980 to the MAG Corp., and it continued to be used as a retreat known as the "Holy Family Retreat House."

The property has served most of the time since then as an inn and restaurant, but has also seen use as a retreat center and nursing home.

Robert Dean II and his boyfriend, Ari Nikki, purchased the hotel in 2005 for $1.6 million. Juniper was featured on Hotel Hell in 2012, during Dean and Nikki's period of operation. Shortly thereafter, the Inn went bankrupt, leading to a tax sale in 2014.

Kenneth James Lucci and his sister, Brenda Bradley acquired the property at auction (tax sale) for $450,000 in 2014. It was initially listed for $1.4 million. After undergoing $1.4 million in renovations and improvements, new owners in 2016 renamed the property "Windsor Mansion Inn." Subsequently, HHK Hospitality, LLC, an entity connected to Hank Steinbrenner of the New York Yankees acquired it in 2019.

In September 2019, Daoud Shakkour purchased the property.

== See also ==
- National Register of Historic Places listings in Windsor County, Vermont
