= Merc =

Merc or MERC may refer to:

== Merc ==
- Merc (MUD), a text-based online game software platform
- Merc (role-playing game), 1981
- Merc (script) or Meroitic Cursive, derived from Demotic Egyptian
- Merc: 2000, an alternative setting for the Twilight 2000 role-playing game
- Merc Clothing, classic British clothing brand
- Mark Hazzard: Merc, a comic book series published by Marvel Comics

== Merc. as an abbreviation ==
- Mercury (automobile), a former division of Ford Motor Company
- Chicago Mercantile Exchange, or the building where it operates, the Chicago Mercantile Exchange Center
- Mercantile National Bank Building, a building in Downtown Dallas
- Mercury Marine, and their line of outboard motors
- Mercedes-Benz, a motor manufacturer and its products (primarily U.K. slang)
- Merc, a slang term for a mercenary
- The Mercury News, a newspaper
- Mercian Regiment, an infantry regiment of the British Army

== Acronyms ==
- Mobile emission reduction credit, used in pollution reduction
- Middle East Rally Championship
- Sir Peter Blake Marine Education and Recreation Centre, an outdoor leisure complex in New Zealand
- Maharashtra Electricity Regulatory Commission, an electricity regulatory commission in Maharashtra, India
- Media Education Research Centre, Kashmir University
- Mineral Exploration Research Centre, a geological research centre at Laurentian University

== See also ==
- Mercs, a 1990 arcade game
- Merck (disambiguation)
- Merk (disambiguation)
- Murk (disambiguation)
- Mercury (disambiguation)
