= Murg =

Murg may refer to:

== Places ==
- Murg (Aare), a river of Switzerland
- Murg (Northern Black Forest), a river and right tributary of the Rhine in the districts of Freudenstadt and Rastatt, Baden-Württemberg, Germany
  - Murg Valley Railway
- Murg (Southern Black Forest), a river and right tributary of the Rhine in the Waldshut district, Baden-Württemberg, Germany
- Murg (Thur), a river of Switzerland
- Murg, Baden-Württemberg, a municipality in the district of Waldshut in Baden-Württemberg, Germany
  - Murg (Baden) station, a railway station
- Murg, St. Gallen, a settlement of the municipality of Quarten in the Swiss canton of St. Gallen
  - Murg railway station

== People ==
- Thomas Murg (born 1994), Austrian footballer

== Other uses ==
- MurG an abbreviated name for Undecaprenyldiphospho-muramoylpentapeptide beta-N-acetylglucosaminyltransferase

== See also ==
- Murk (disambiguation)
