= Albert W. Merck =

American politician and philanthropist (1920–2014)

Albert Wall Merck (August 31, 1920 – July 22, 2014) was an American politician and philanthropist. He was a member of the Merck family being the grandson of Merck & Co founder George Merck and son of George W. Merck.

== Career ==
He served in the New Jersey Assembly from 1971 to 1974. Merck graduated from Harvard College and held graduate degrees from Columbia University and Rutgers University. He was appointed by the governor of New Jersey as one of the original commissioners of the New Jersey Casino Control Commission. He also served on the board of Merck & Co for several years.

== Personal life ==
In 1946, Merck married Katharine Morgan Evarts, the daughter of Connecticut politician Katharine Evarts.
