= Grimm 31 =

Hamburg merchant's house

Coordinates: 53°32′47″N 9°59′36″E

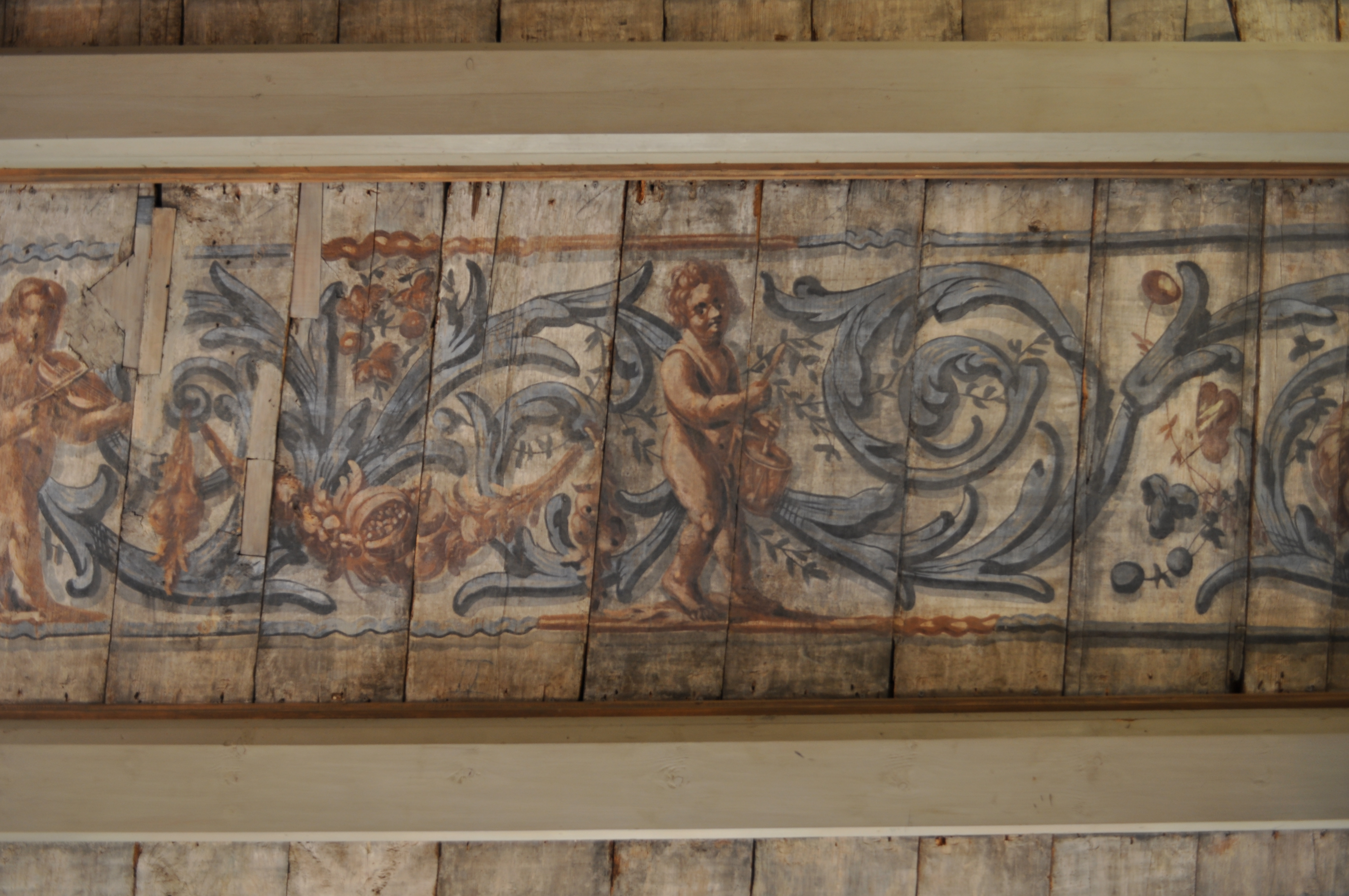
- Part of the ceiling
- Interactive map of the Grimm 31 area

General information
- Type: Hamburg merchant's house
- Location: Grimm 31, Hamburg, Germany
- Completed: 16th Century
- Destroyed: 1943

Grimm 31 was a Hamburg merchant's house on the island of Grimm in the center of Hamburg, Germany.

The house was built in the first half of the 16th century and destroyed in 1943 by Allied bombing of Hamburg during Operation Gomorrah, a massive World War II air raid campaign.

It is known mainly for its ornate wooden ceiling from the second half of the 17th century, which has been in the Hamburg History Museum since 1922. The ceiling was commissioned by the then owner, the merchant Christian Hasenbank.

The fully decorated pine ceiling was one of many examples in Hamburg merchant houses, but is probably the only 17th century example to remain accessible. The painting is by an unknown artist on pine boards, 151 of which are still preserved. In the Hamburg Museum it is reconstructed on 17 joists with a further 68 boards added. The Baroque artwork includes putti and other figures in playful and bawdy acts. Within the image, there are several jokes: it shows Cain and Abel, referring to an old Hamburg saying, that "The Grimm" is the oldest street in the world, because according to the Bible, Cain slew Abel "im Grimm" ("in a rage").

The house's 1691 portal was typical of the houses in Grimm and Cremon. As with other houses from the late 17th century, the portal and windows were almost equal elements of the facade. The portal itself was adorned with plant motifs and an angel's head. The mermaids, who also graced the portal, were probably the only ones of their kind in Hamburg.
