= Norddeutsche Bank =

Defunct German bank (1856-1929)

The Norddeutsche Bank was a German bank that existed from 1856 to 1929. It was established by Berenberg Bank, H.J. Merck & Co., Salomon Heine and other private founders and later became the largest bank in Hamburg. In 1929, it was merged into Deutsche Bank.

== History ==
Norddeutsche Bank was founded in 1856 by Berenberg Bank, H.J. Merck & Co., the bank house of Salomon Heine and private founders including Robert Kayser and Johann Caesar Godeffroy. It was the first joint-stock bank in northern Germany. Based out of Hamburg, it became the largest bank in Germany in the late 1890s. The bank financed and held shares in various industrial ventures such as the Norddeutsche Affinerie AG and HAPAG.

== Merger ==
The bank had working relations with the bank of Disconto-Gesellschaft since its founding. In 1895, it became a subsidiary of Disconto-Gesellschaft. However, the bank continued to operate as a separate legal entity under its own name. In 1929, the Norddeutsche Bank was integrated into Deutsche Bank following the merger of Disconto-Gesellschaft with Deutsche Bank. Since 1930, Norddeutsche Bank operated under its name in Hamburg, jointly managed by Disconto-Gesellschaft and Deutsche Bank. In 1932, the name was formally changed to Deutsche Bank and Disconto-Gesellschaft, before using the Deutsche Bank name since 1937. The Norddeutsche Bank name was used briefly between 1948 and 1957, which was founded as a successor institution to Deutsche Bank, before the Deutsche Bank was re-established in 1957 with the Hamburg location serving as one of three headquarters of the new organization.

== See also ==
- List of banks in Germany
