= Great fire of Hamburg =

1842 fire in the German city-state of Hamburg

Coordinates: 53°33′04″N 9°59′38″E

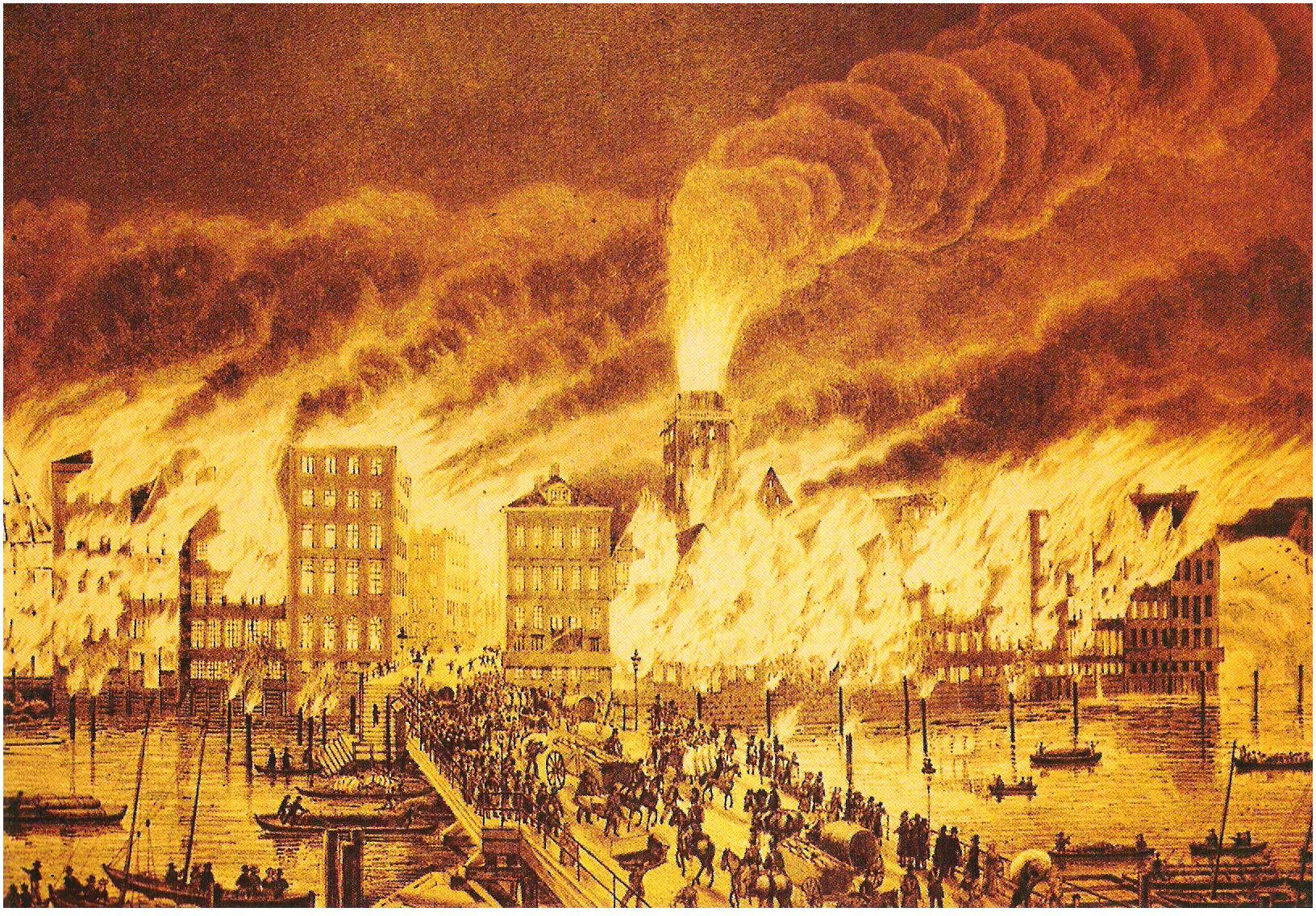
The Great Fire, 1842 painting by Peter Suhr

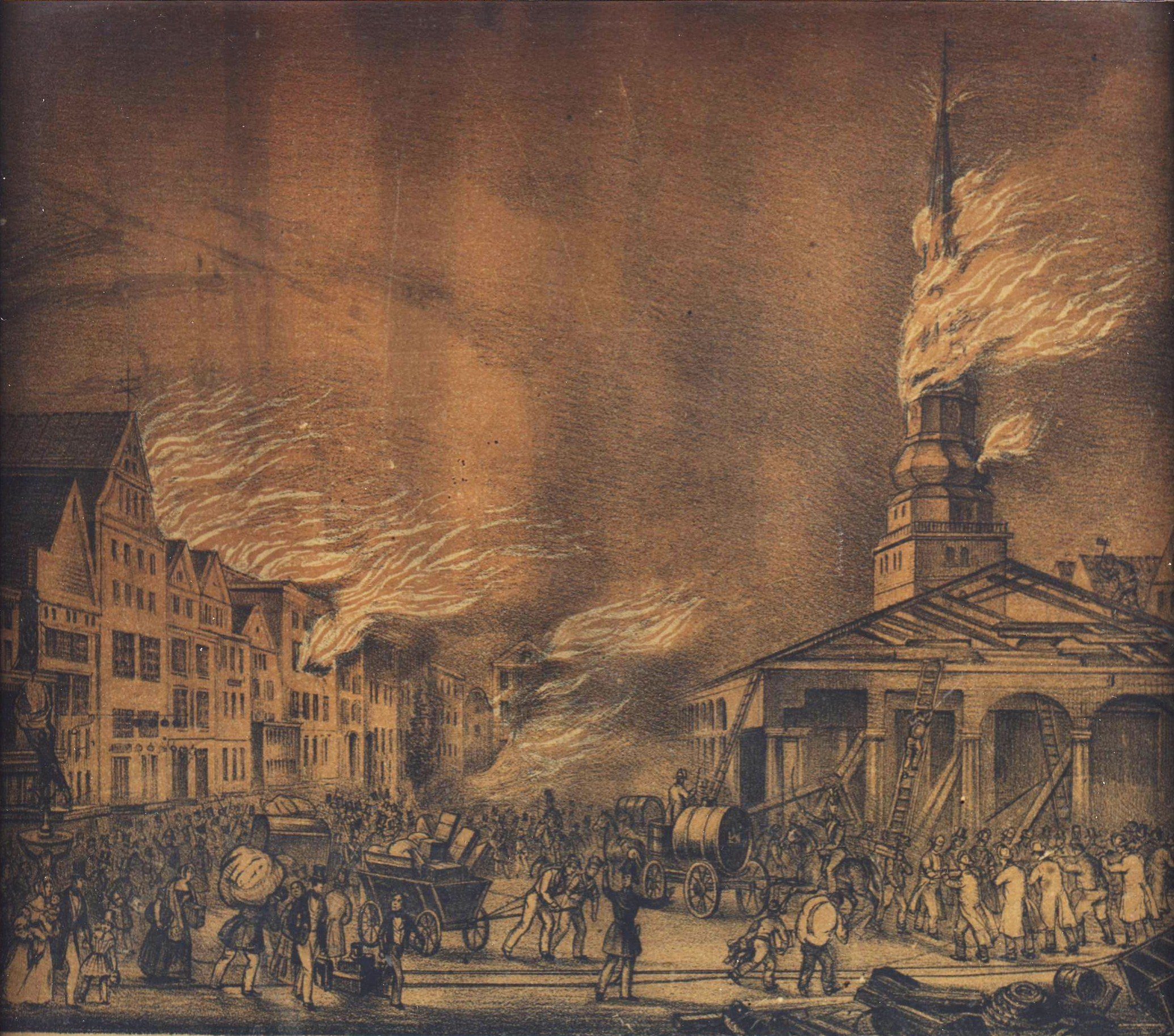
Nikolaikirche on fire

The Great fire of Hamburg began early on 5 May 1842, in Deichstraße and burned until the morning of 8 May, destroying about one third of the buildings in the Altstadt. It killed 51 people and destroyed 1,700 residences and several important public buildings, necessitating major civic rebuilding and prompting infrastructure improvements. The heavy demand on insurance companies led to the establishment of reinsurance.

== Fire ==
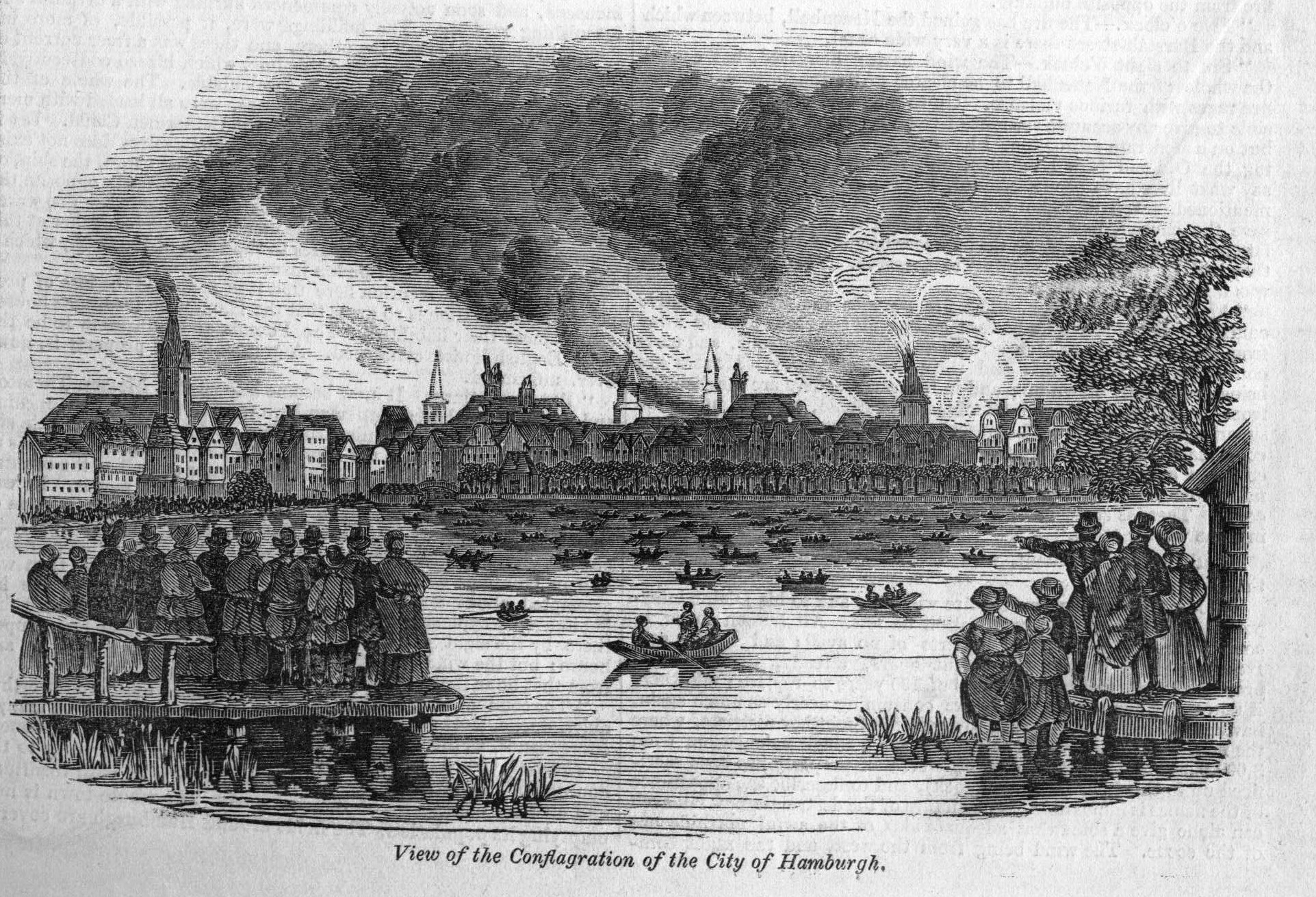
"View of the Conflagration of the City of Hamburgh", Illustrated London News, week ending 11 May 1842

The fire began in Eduard Cohen's cigar factory at Deichstraße 42 or 44 early in the morning of 5 May 1842; a neighbour alerted the night watch at about 1 a.m. It quickly spread to number 25, across the street. The weather had been unusually dry, and the wind was strong and changeable. Hamburg had fire lookouts on church towers, known as Türmer, in addition to night watchmen who had horns to sound to report a fire, and a code by which church bells reported the location and severity of fires. Volunteer teams of firefighters competed to earn a premium by being first to reach a fire. The city was dense with wooden and half-timbered houses, which tended to be tall and narrow, reflecting the shape of the building plots, and merchants operated their businesses out of their houses, so that many included warehouses containing flammables such as rubber and shellac. The provision of water for firefighting, from the Elbe and canals, was inefficient: low water made pumping difficult, and the leather hoses would not slide on ladders, so that water could not be pumped above ground level. By daybreak much of the Altstadt was on fire.

As the fire continued to burn, collapsed buildings prevented fireboats from using the canals, and there was no system to coordinate the firefighters from different parishes. Firefighters from outside the city, as far away as Lübeck and Kiel, joined the effort. Some buildings were blown up in an attempt to create firebreaks, including the old Rathaus (city hall), originally built in 1290; 18 wagonloads of records were salvaged from it first. 5 May was Ascension Day; a few hours after the midday feastday service, despite strenuous efforts, the spire of the Nikolaikirche collapsed, and the church burned down. There was panic and extensive looting; the militia aided in the firefighting until it had to combat looting instead. About half the population, some 70,000 people, fled.

After three days and nights, thanks to a further shift in the wind and what remained of the former walls of the city, the fire was finally put out at 7 am on 8 May; the location is marked by the street name Brandsende, "fire's end", near the main station. 51 people died, including 22 of the firefighters, and approximately a third of the city was destroyed, including 1,700 residential buildings containing more than 4,000 homes, more than 100 warehouses, seven churches, two synagogues, sixty schools, and public buildings including the Bank of Hamburg in addition to the Rathaus. Approximately 20,000 people were left homeless, including four senators.

== Aftermath ==
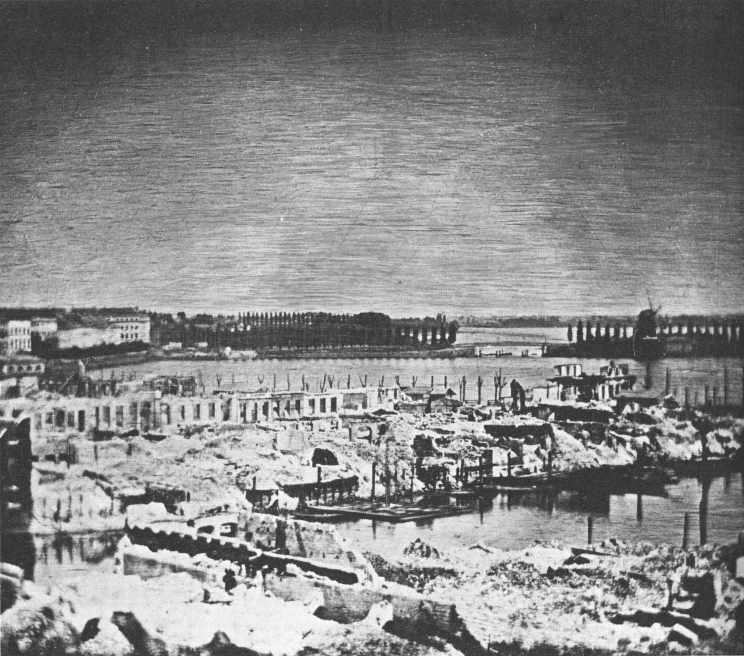
Photograph from the roof of the Stock Exchange of ruins after the fire, by Hermann Biow, one of the earliest news photographs

The fire was covered in the world press, including eye-witness reports and an engraving in the first issue of the Illustrated London News. Hermann Biow, a pioneering photographer, took daguerrotypes from the roof of the new Stock Exchange building, which had survived; these are the first photographs of the city and possibly the first news photographs. Painted dioramas depicting the catastrophe later toured. A visual vocabulary derived from Roman ruins was used to depict the magnitude of the disaster.

Almost 7 million marks was raised in an international appeal to help the survivors, in which the largest donors were Tsar Nicholas I of Russia and King Louis Philippe of France. The cities of Antwerp, London, Riga, Rotterdam, and St. Petersburg donated funds. 60 German writers donated work for a fund-raising Hansa-Album. Salomon Heine, uncle of the poet Heinrich Heine, insisted on meeting his obligations as an insurer and persuaded other merchants to do so.

== Effects ==
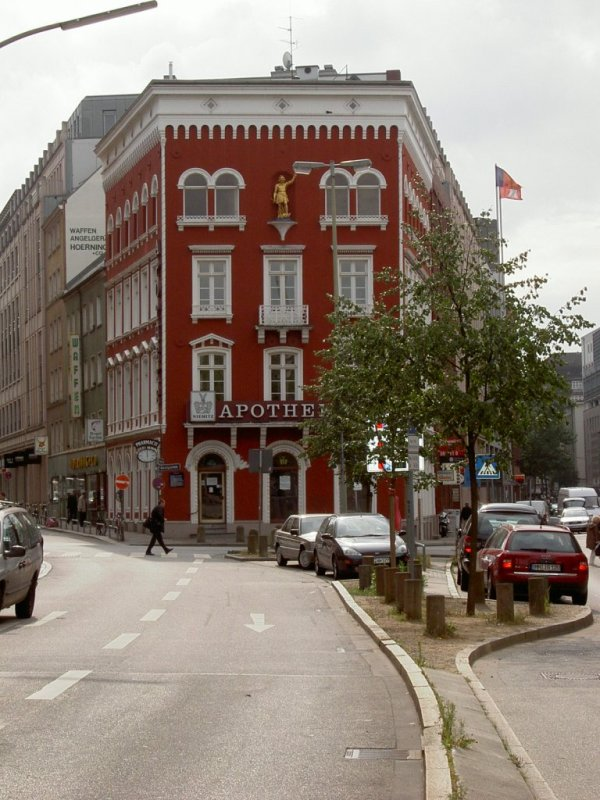
Post-fire rebuilding: in the foreground the Niemitzhaus

The city was rebuilt quickly, with a greater use of brick and a brief fashion for Classical "white city" architecture in public buildings. A Technical Commission was established; a British engineer, William Lindley, proposed a reconstruction plan that was adopted with modifications (maintaining property lines rather than straightening all the streets) and designed a project to drain and develop the Hammerbrook area, which was built up with rubble from the fire. (Lindley had already been involved in planning the city's first railroad connection, the Hamburg-Bergedorf Railway Company, which had been due to open on May 7 and instead was put in service two days early to bring firefighters from elsewhere and evacuate survivors.). Building with wood was no longer permitted, firewalls and fireproof gables were mandated and regulations applied to chimneys and sources of ignition, and streets were widened. Merchants increasingly built separate warehouses near the docks, moved their residences to the suburbs, and from the 1880s on, constructed dedicated buildings called Kontorhäuser for their businesses. Lindley spearheaded the construction of sewers and a water supply, although the city declined to spend the money to sand-filter the river water, so that the water became notorious for its living and dead contents and contributed to the cholera epidemic of 1892. By 1870 a modern gas network and streetlighting were also in place. The fire-fighting system was reorganized; by 1866 a survey noted that there were two fire districts, a high-pressure water supply, and almost 2,000 hydrants.

The fire caused 100 million marks in losses, seriously straining many insurance companies. The municipal Hamburger Feuerkasse (Hamburg Fire Fund) or Cassa, participation in which had been made mandatory for most residents in 1817, was liable for 38 million marks, approximately equivalent to 1 billion euro in 2006 money, and had to raise a bond for 34.4 million marks (with Salomon Heine putting up much of the collateral), which it paid off over 46 years. The private Gothaer Feuer (Gotha Fire) had to have 250,000 thalers in coins shipped to Hamburg to satisfy claimants who insisted on payment in Prussian currency. After the fire, British insurers increasingly concentrated on the British Empire. The disaster was the primary impetus to the establishment of the first reinsurance company, Kölnische Rückversicherungs-Gesellschaft or Kölnische Rück (Cologne Re), an ancestor of Gen Re, which was first discussed later in 1842, although it was not chartered until 1846.

== In literature ==
Elise Averdieck came into the city from the suburb of St. Georg during the fire and described the scenes in the streets; she also described it in Roland und Elisabeth (1851; repr. 1962), part 2 of her Kinderleben, autobiographical tales for children. The fire is the setting of novels by Carl Reinhardt (Der Brand von Hamburg oder der fünfte Mai. Ein Lebensbild von der Unterelbe, 1874; repr. 1989) and Edgar Maass (Das große Feuer, 1939; repr. 1950) and a story by Paul Schurek ("Der Hamburger Brand", 1922; repr. 1949). Thomas Mann's 1901 novel Buddenbrooks briefly mentions the fire in Part 3, Chapter 1.

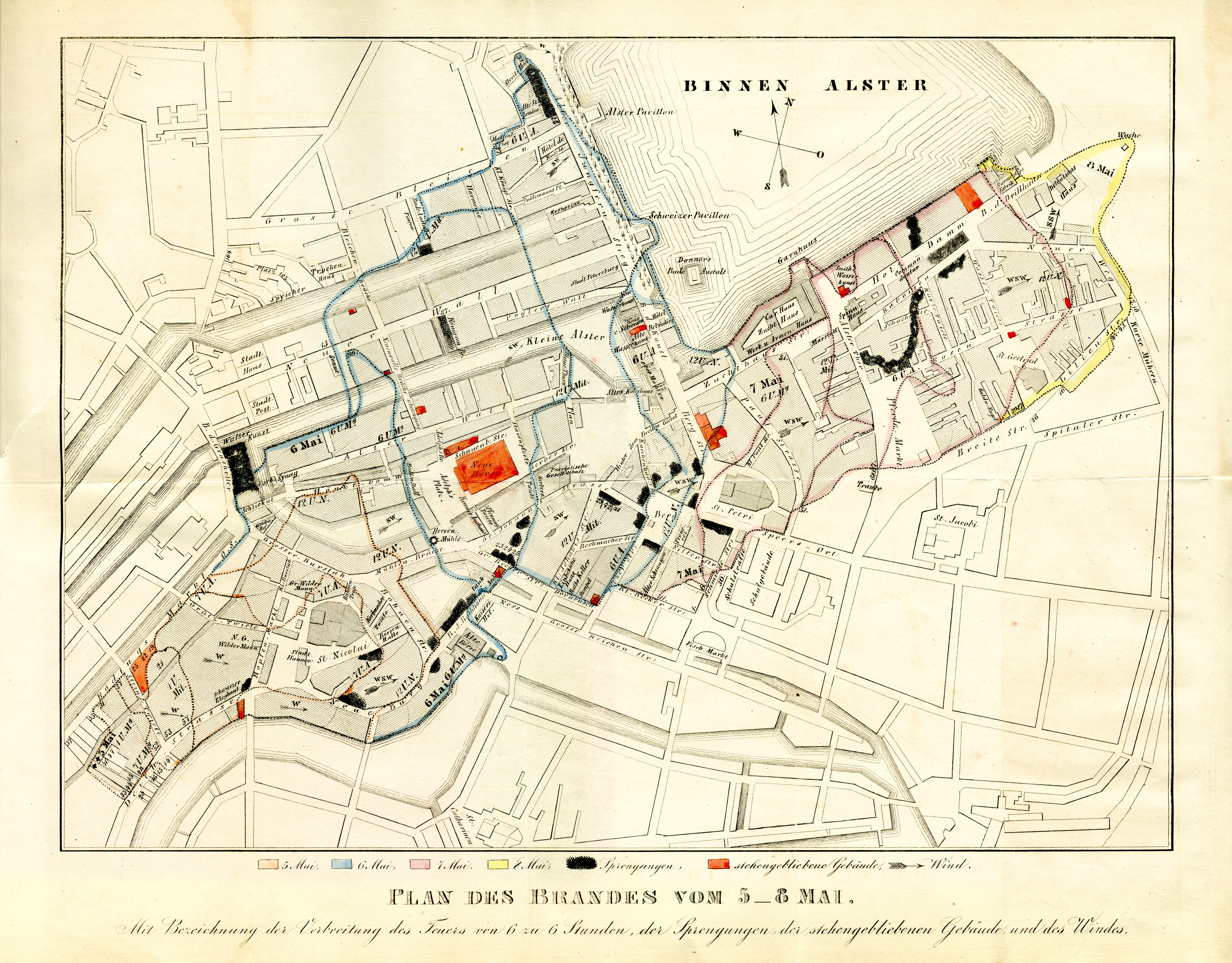
Map of the extent of damage in the Great Fire of Hamburg, from Dr. H. Schleiden's 1843 book on the disaster. Colour-shaded lines indicate extent of conflagration at six-hour intervals: salmon, 5 May; blue, 6 May; pink, 7 May; yellow, 8 May. Black indicates structures blown up; red, buildings that survived. Arrows indicate wind direction.
