= Nikolaifleet =

Coordinates: 53°32′44″N 9°59′16″E

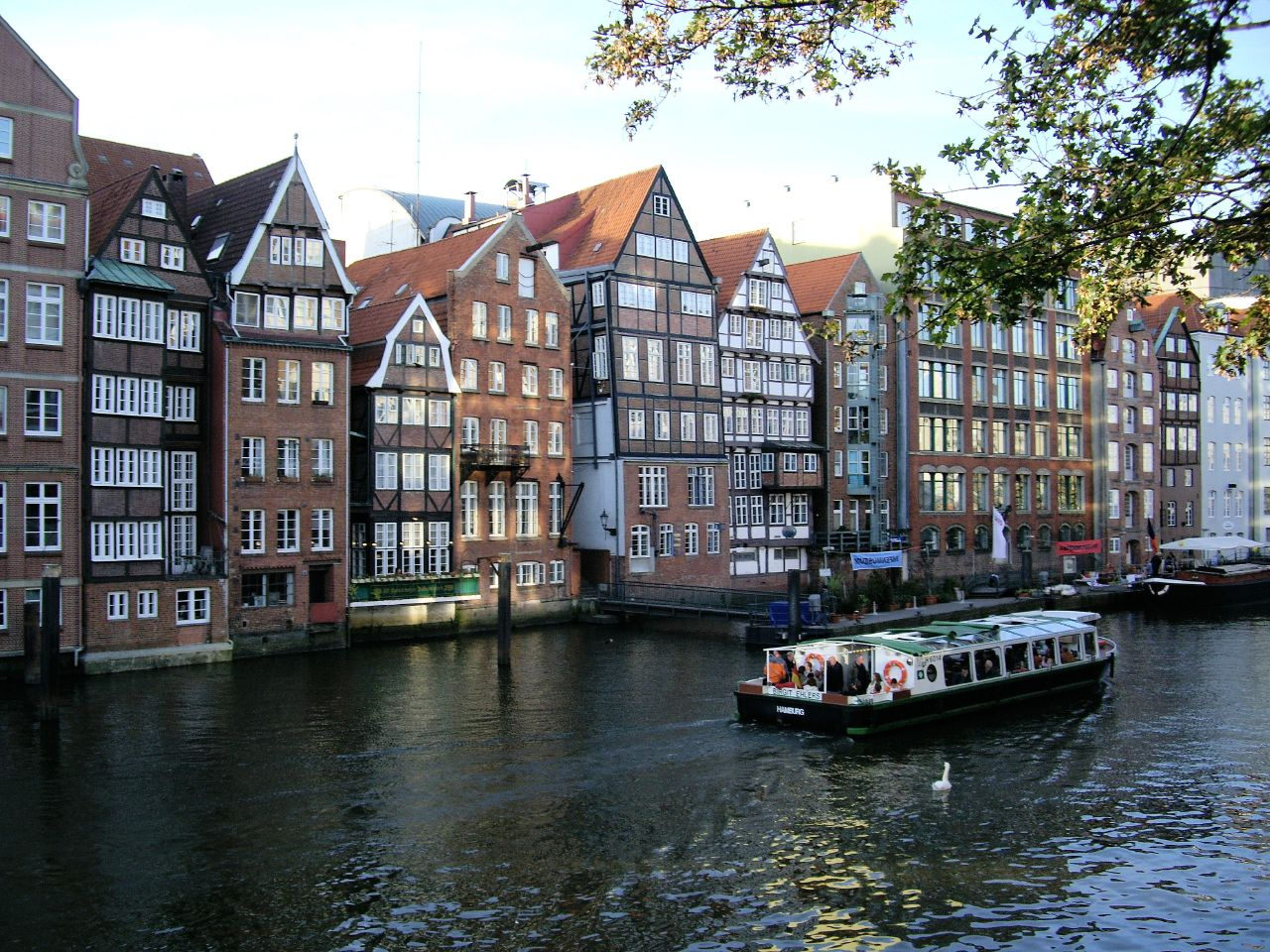
Nikolaifleet

Nikolaifleet is a canal in the Altstadt of Hamburg, which was the original branch of the Alster estuary. It separates the Cremon island from the mainland. First mentioned in 1188, the Nikolaifleet is considered one of the oldest parts of the Port of Hamburg.

As nearby Deichstraße, the Nikolaifleet is a popular visitor attraction.
