= Johann Heinrich Merck =

German author and critic (1741–1791)

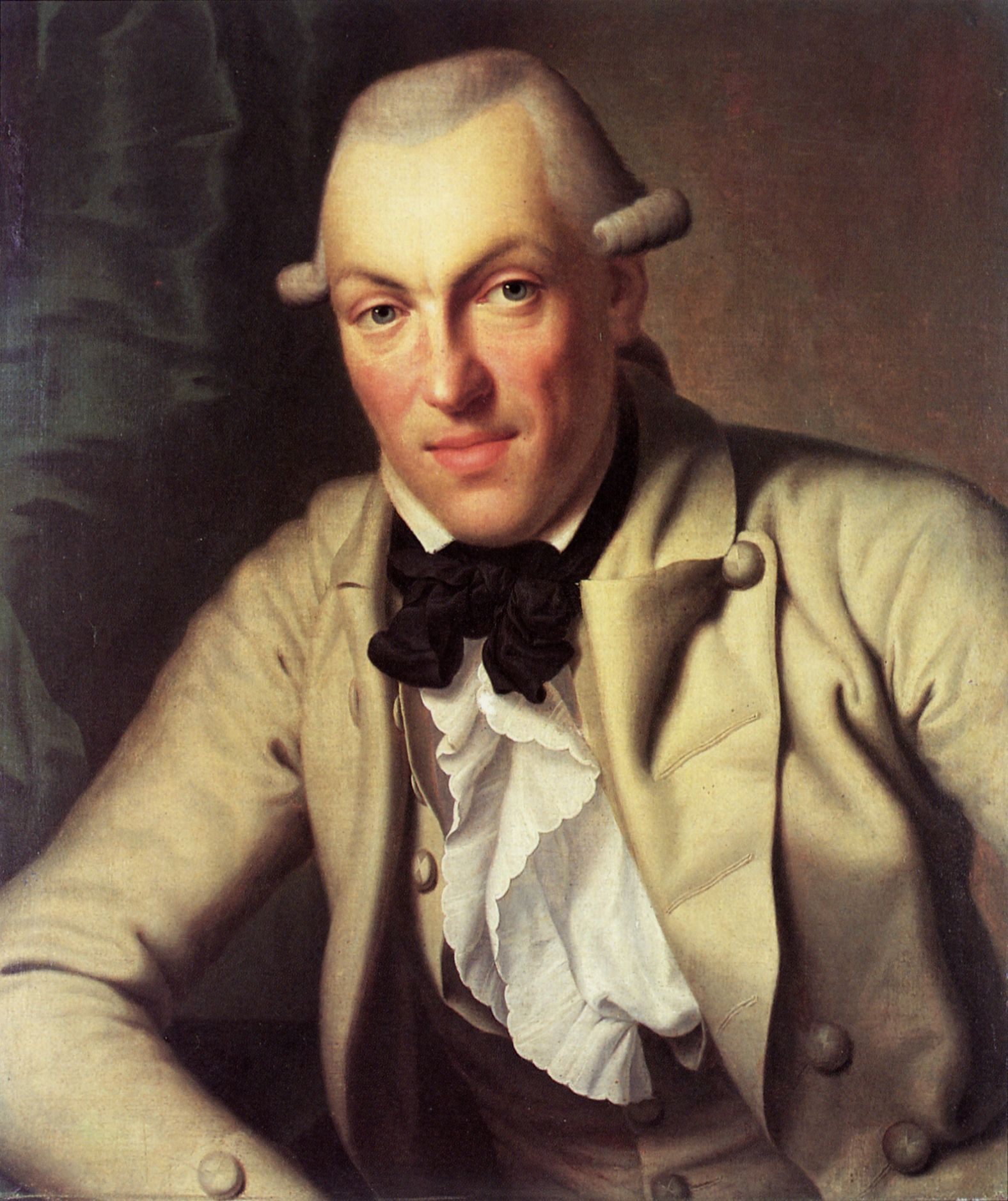
Johann Heinrich Merck

Johann Heinrich Merck (11 April 1741 – 27 June 1791) was a German author and critic. He was born in Darmstadt, a few days after the death of his father, a chemist.

== Biography ==
Johann Heinrich Merck's parents were pharmacist Johann Franz Merck (1687–1741) and his second wife Elizabeth Catharina Merck, née Keyser (1706–1786).

He studied law at Gießen, and in 1767 was given an appointment in the paymaster's department at Darmstadt, and a year later himself became paymaster. For a number of years he exercised considerable influence upon the literary movement in Germany; he helped to found the Frankfurter gelehrte Anzeigen in 1772, and was one of the chief contributors to Nicolai's Allgemeine Bibliothek.

In 1773 he accompanied the Landgravine Karoline of Hesse-Darmstadt to Saint Petersburg, and on his return was a guest of the duke Charles Augustus of Weimar in the Wartburg. Unfortunate speculations brought him into pecuniary embarrassment in 1788, and although friends, notably Goethe, were ready to come to his assistance, his losses — combined with the death of five of his children — so preyed upon his mind that he committed suicide on 27 June 1791.

Merck distinguished himself mainly as a critic; his keen perception, critical perspicacity and refined taste made him a valuable guide to the young writers of the Sturm und Drang. He also wrote a number of small treatises, dealing mostly with literature and art, especially painting, and a few poems, stories, narratives and the like; but they have not much intrinsic importance. Merck's letters are particularly interesting and instructive, and throw much light upon the literary conditions of his time.

Merck's Ausgewählte Schriften zur schönen Literatur und Kunst were published by A Stahr in 1840, with a biography.

== See also ==
- Merck family
