= Grimm (Hamburg) =

Coordinates: 53.54667°N 9.99594°E

- Former island
- Interactive map of Grimm
- Country: Germany
- City: Hamburg

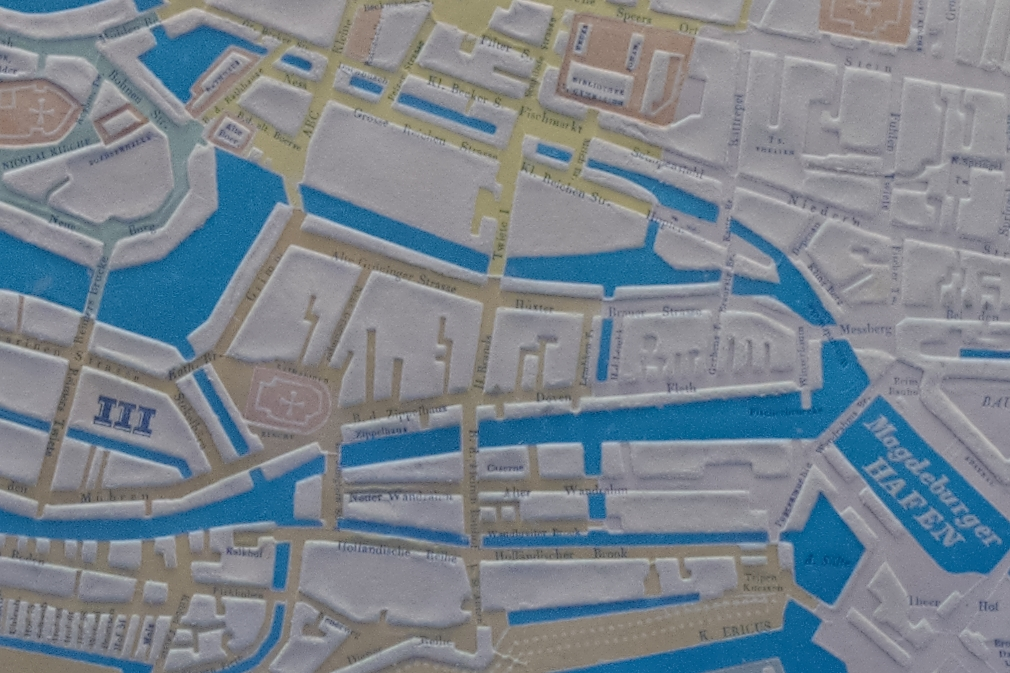
Grimm island (center) in a city map of 1841

Grimm (or The Grimm) is a former island on the Alster river in Hamburg, Germany, east of Cremon. Today, there is a street in the old town, which is probably on the island.

Adolf III, Count of Schauenburg and Holstein, had brought settlers from Westphalia to colonise the island. Its shore was built up after three floods from 1216 to 1219, and the island was reclaimed. Up to 1300, the island was outside the city walls. In 1246, Grimm was absorbed by the city of Hamburg, and together with Cremon formed the parish of the newly built St. Catherine's Church.

Grimm was untouched by the Hamburg fire of 1842 and was one of the few areas of the old city to retain its historic structure in the 20th century. These were mainly four-storey and three-to five-axis Hamburg merchants' houses from the Baroque style of architecture, with typical facades, portals, and rich pre-built Ausluchten. The early 20th century, however, saw a change in the composition of the population.

The painted ceiling of Grimm 31 has been preserved in the Museum of Hamburg History since its opening in 1922.
