= Emanuel Merck Lectureship =

Chemistry research award conferred by Technische Universität Darmstadt and Merck KGaA

The Emanuel Merck Lectureship was founded in 1992 by Technische Universität Darmstadt and Merck KGaA located in Darmstadt, Germany. The lectureship aspires to enlighten scientists and students at Technische Universität Darmstadt, as well as Merck KGaA employees and interested public with leading scientific research in chemistry.

The award honors Heinrich Emanuel Merck (1794–1855) the founder of Merck, an entrepreneur, an original experimenter and a successful scientist.

Emanuel Merck maintained membership in many scientific associations and held many personal relationships with leading researchers of his era, including Justus von Liebig, Friedrich Wöhler, Max von Pettenkofer and Louis Pasteur. The Emanuel Merck Lectureship attempts to continue this tradition of international exchange between researchers.

The lectures are held over multiple days. The lectures include lectures that are open to the public, lectures for a closed audience and seminars for students. The invitation includes travel and a cash prize (€30,000) for speakers.

== Awardees ==
Frances Arnold at Caltech in 2021

Susumu Kitagawa at the Royal Swedish Academy of Sciences

List of previous awardees ( indicates Nobel Prize recipients):

- 1993 Albert Eschenmoser – ETH Zürich
- 1994 Kenneth Wade – University of Durham
- 1995 Jean-Marie Lehn – University of Straßburg ( 1987)
- 1996 Manfred Eigen – MPI Göttingen ( 1967)
- 1998 Jean-Pierre Changeux – Institut Pasteur, Paris
- 2000 Stuart Schreiber – Harvard University, Cambridge
- 2003 Samuel J. Danishefsky – Columbia University, New York
- 2005 George M. Whitesides – Harvard University Cambridge
- 2007 Sir Harold W. Kroto – University of Sussex, Brighton ( 1996)
- 2009 Axel Ullrich – Max-Planck-Institut für Biochemie, Martinsried
- 2011 Carolyn R. Bertozzi – University of California, Berkeley ( 2022)
- 2013 Frances H. Arnold – California Institute of Technology, Pasadena ( 2018)
- 2015 Paul Anastas – Yale University, New Haven
- 2017 Phil Baran – Scripps Research Institute, San Diego
- 2018 Jennifer Doudna – University of California Berkeley, California ( 2020)
- 2019 Susumu Kitagawa – Kyoto University, Kyoto ( 2025)
- 2022 John F. Hartwig – University of California Berkeley, California
- 2024 Craig M. Crews – Yale University, New Haven
- 2026 Benjamin Cravatt III – Scripps Research Institute, San Diego
