= Robert Kayser =

Robert Kayser (born 15 January 1805 in Naumburg; died 27 October 1877 in Hamburg) was a Hamburg industrialist and banker.

As a young man Kayser travelled to Chile in 1829 to seek his fortune where, after a while, he went into partnership with Max Theodor Hayn to found the firm Kayser, Hayn & Co. in Mazatlán. In 1839 he came back to Hamburg. In 1843 Kayser and Hayn, together with their friend Kunhardt, founded a firm in Valparaíso which foundered in 1849; in the same year Kayser, Hayn & Co. in Mazatlán was dissolved. In 1846 Kayser and his business partners founded the Firm Kunhardt, Kayser & Hayn in Hamburg, which was renamed Kayser & Hayn after Kunhardt's death in 1850. Hayn left the firm in 1854 and the firm was known as Robert Kayser until 1865. Kayser was among the founders in 1856 of the Norddeutsche Bank and was one of its leading lights, putting up founding capital of 500.000 Marks. He belonged to the board of Norddeutsche Bank from 1856 to 1877.

From 1850, Kayser belonged to the Chamber of Commerce of which he was president in 1856. He was also a member of the Hamburg Bürgerschaft (parliament) from 1859 to 1868 and from 1871 to 1877.

His daughter Cornelia was married to Rittmeister Vally von Blumenthal.
