= Salomon Heine =

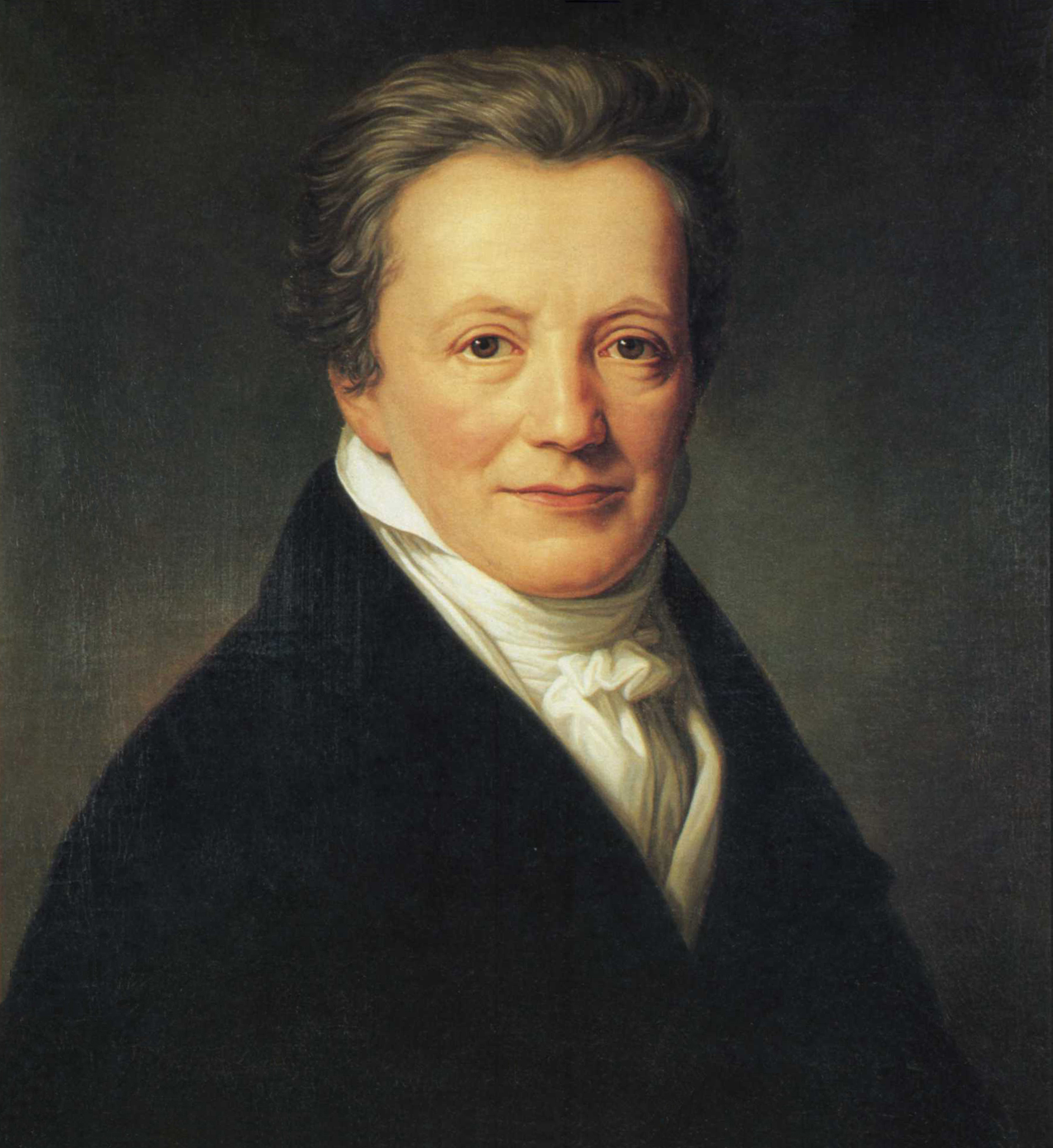
- Born: 19 October 1767; Hanover, Electorate of Brunswick-Lüneburg
- Died: 23 December 1844 (aged 77); Hamburg
- Occupation: Banker
- Known for: Promoting poet Heinrich Heine
- Relatives: Heinrich Heine (nephew)

Salomon Heine (19 October 1767 – 23 December 1844) was a merchant and banker in Hamburg. Heine was born in Hanover. Penniless, he came to Hamburg in 1784 and in the following years acquired sizeable assets. It was common knowledge at the time that he was benefactor and patron to his nephew Heinrich Heine. Because of his wealth – by the time of his death his estate was worth an estimated € 1.1 billion (adjusted for inflation as of 2013)– he was called "Rothschild of Hamburg".

Salomon Heine founded his private banking house in Hamburg and was among the founding shareholders of Norddeutsche Bank (1856) in Hamburg. Eventually, Norddeutsche Bank became what is now known as Deutsche Bank through its merger via Disconto-Gesellschaft in 1929.

== Life ==
Heine learned the trade of banking at Bankhaus Popert in Hamburg. Subsequently, he started his own business as a draft broker, cooperating closely with Emanuel Anton von Halle. In 1797, together with Marcus Abraham Heckscher (1770–1823), he founded the Heckscher & Co. merchant bank. In 1818, now being the sole executive director, he changed the company's name to Bankhaus Salomon Heine. During the following years he rose to becoming one of Hamburg's most successful bankers of the time.

=== Promoter of poet Heinrich Heine ===
Salomon Heine let young Heinrich Heine work and learn at his Hamburg bank Heckscher & Co. and eventually offered Heinrich a position with the cloth company Harry Heine & Comp. Heinrich though, who had fallen in love with Salomon's daughter Amalie, devoted himself chiefly to poetry and took very little interest in business. Soon he had to declare bankruptcy. Salomon Heine was angered by his nephew choosing poetry as a way of life, in which he himself saw no money. His disapproval became apparent in the dictum: "Hätt er gelernt was Rechtes, müsst er nicht schreiben Bücher (Had he learned something proper he needed not write books)." Nonetheless, Salomon paid for Heinrich's studies in Jurisprudence and until his death he regularly granted Heinrich financial aid.

=== Benefactor of Hamburg ===
Salomon Heine's bounty and his position as benefactor are traded by an anecdote: emissaries from a religious order who intended to build a hospital were asking wealthy Hamburg residents for donations. The order was then told to first contact the Jewish banker Heine, the people would donate the same amount as Heine plus one additional Thaler. The friars told Heine of the merchants' reaction and he let them name the price of the hospital's construction. Heine paid exactly one half, so the other businessmen, bound by their words, were obliged to finance the rest.

Moreover, Heine worked in Hamburg for the rest of his life. After the disastrous Great Fire of Hamburg in 1842, he participated in the city's reconstruction with his private assets. Additionally, he founded the Israelite Hospital of Hamburg in remembrance of his wife Betty who had died in 1837. Heinrich Heine lauded his uncle's foundation in the form of a poem, "Das neue israelitische Hospital zu Hamburg", which was published in the volume "Neue Gedichte".

What Heine as a personality meant for Hamburg was most clearly shown though at his funeral. It turned into a demonstration of connecting popularity: thousands of people, Jews as well as Christians, spontaneously accompanied Heine on his last journey to the Ottensen Jewish cemetery.
