= Hermann Biow =

German photographer

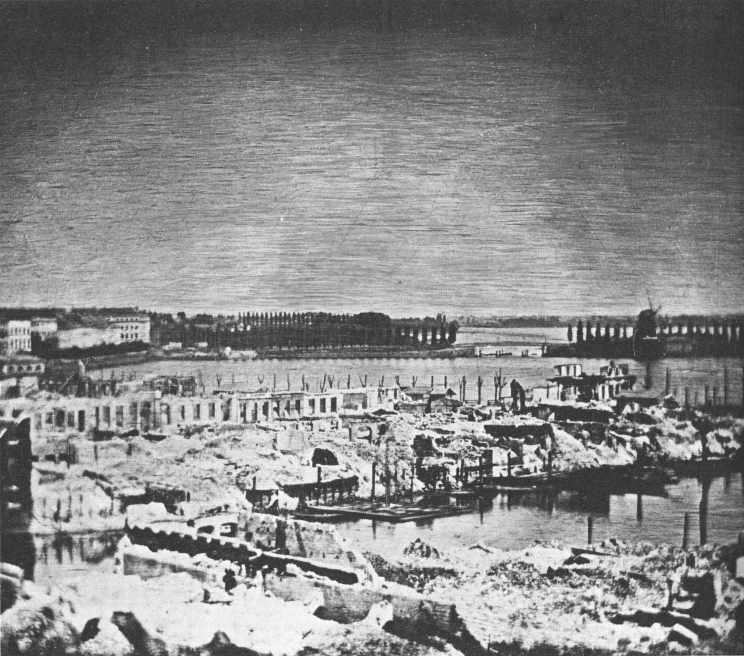
Ruins caused by the Hamburg fire, daguerreotype by Hermann Biow, 1842

Hermann Biow (1804 – 20 February 1850) was an early German photographer who worked with daguerreotypes. In partnership with Carl Ferdinand Stelzner, he opened Germany's first daguerreotype studio in Hamburg in 1841. He is remembered for his images of the great fire in May 1842.

When Biow moved to Dresden in the late 1840s, his sister Jenny Bossard-Biow took over the Hamburg studio, where she continued to produce daguerreotypes. He died in Dresden in 1850 due to fumes from his photographic production process.
