= Murk =

Murk may refer to:

- Murk (band), a Cuban-American house-music duo
  - Murk (album), its 2004 self-titled release
- Murk (film) (Danish title: Mørke), a 2005 Danish thriller by Jannik Johansen and Anders Thomas Jensen
- Murk, a minor character in Buffy the Vampire Slayer
- Murk, a German name of Mořkov, a municipality and village in the Czech Republic

== People ==
- George E. Murk (1894-1971), American businessman, firefighter, and politician
- Murk van Phelsum (1730–1779), Dutch physician

== See also ==
- "Murking", a song by Jme
- Merc (disambiguation)
- Merk (disambiguation)
- Mirk, American band
- Merq, ticker symbol for Mercury Interactive
