= Jenny Bossard-Biow =

German photographer (1813–after 1858)

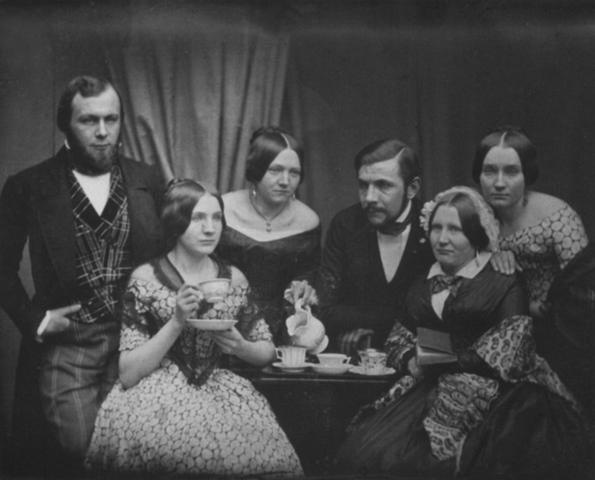
Familie am Kaffeetisch, daguerreotype by Jenny Bossard, 1849

Jenny Bossard-Biow (c. 1813 – after 1858) was an early German female photographer, possibly the first woman in Germany to have worked with the daguerreotype process. She was the sister of the photographer Hermann Biow who had established a studio in the Altona district of Hamburg in 1841. When he moved to Dresden in 1848, Bossard-Biow continued to run the Hamburg studio.
