= Suhr brothers =

German artists

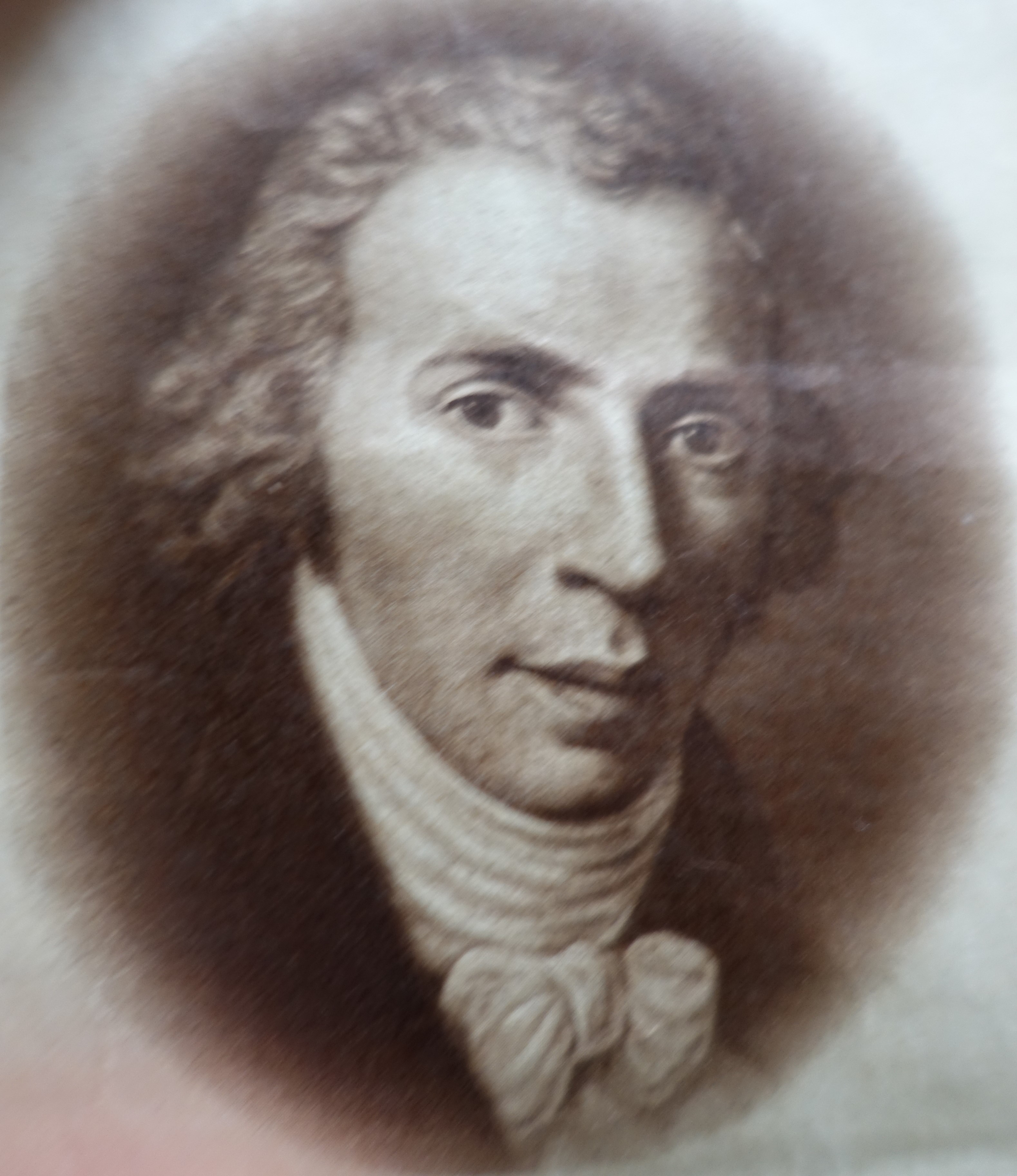
Christoffer Suhr; self-portrait (1801)

The brothers Christoffer Suhr (29 May 1771 – 13 May 1842), Cornelius Suhr (8 January 1781 – 3 July 1857) and Peter Suhr (17 June 1788 – 20 September 1857) were German lithographers, painters, and illustrators. They were all born in Hamburg and died there.

== Biographical notes ==
Together, they created several hundred lithographs, engravings and etchings. Their motifs were mostly drawn from everyday life and shaped what came to be known as "Hamburgensie". They also created and displayed panoramic views of Hamburg.

Christoffer Suhr was the only one of the three to complete a formal artistic education. He initially studied with the portrait painter, Franz Conrad Löhr (1735–1812), in Hamburg, then went to Braunschweig, where he worked for the landscape painter, Pascha Johann Friedrich Weitsch. As was customary at the time, this was followed by a study trip to Italy. He also toured the Mediterranean from 1792 to 1795. The Academy of Arts, Berlin, named him a professor in 1796, although he continued to be based in Hamburg. From 1817, he was a member of the Freemasons lodge, "St. George to the Green Spruce".

Cornelius Suhr worked with Christoffer after 1805, as an engraver and draftsman. He was responsible for their panoramic views of Hamburg; distributing as well as helping to create them.

Peter Suhr began as a businessman and joined his brothers around 1819, after which their company was called "Spielkartenfabrik und Kupferdruckerey C.C.P. Suhr" (playing card factory and copperplate printing). He was also involved with their panoramas and was in charge of lithography after 1828. About the same time, he organized the printing and publishing division of their company; playing a major role in their book series, Views of Hamburg and its Surroundings, which were issued in folio editions. In 1831, the company name was changed again to the Lithographische Institut Peter Suhr. After Christoffer's death in 1842, he took over all of the firm's operations.

In 1914, a street (Suhrsweg) was named after them in Hamburg's Barmbek-Nord district. In 2019, their works were part of an exhibition called Hamburger Schule – Das 19. Jahrhundert neu entdeckt, at the Hamburger Kunsthalle

== Selected works ==
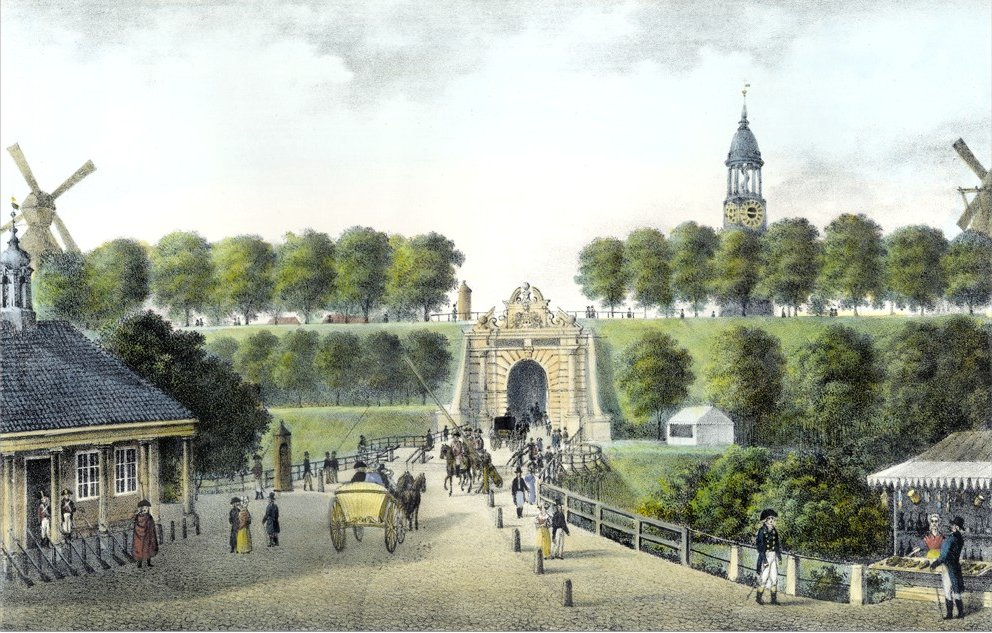
The Millerntor

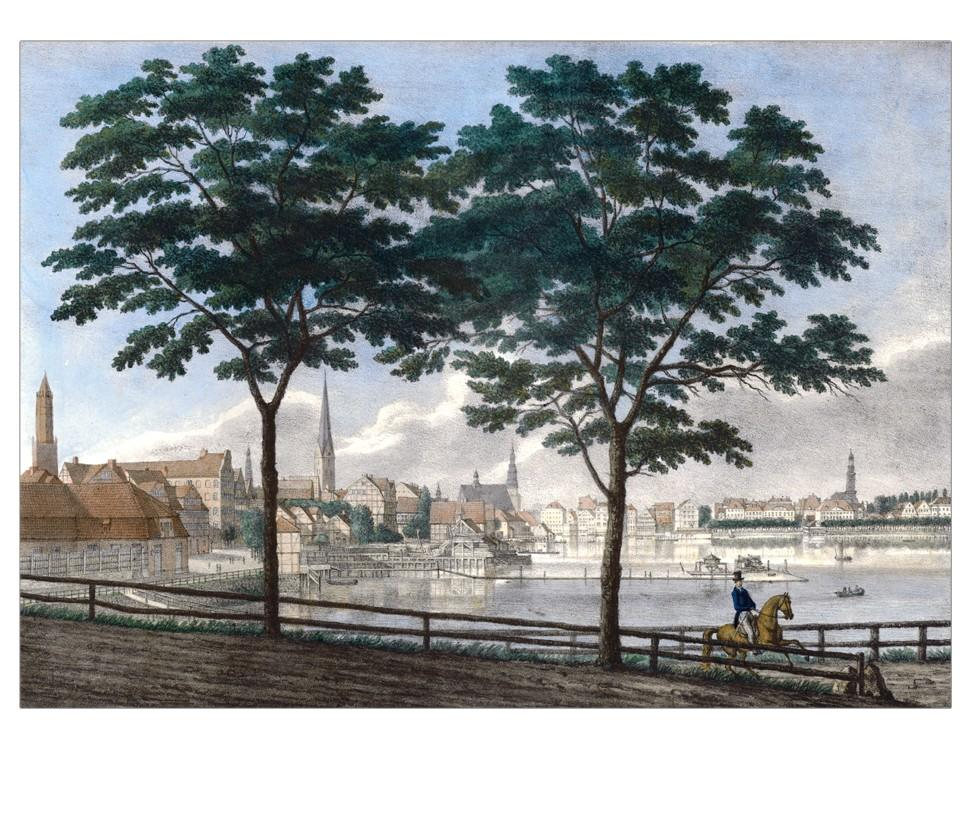
View of the Alster

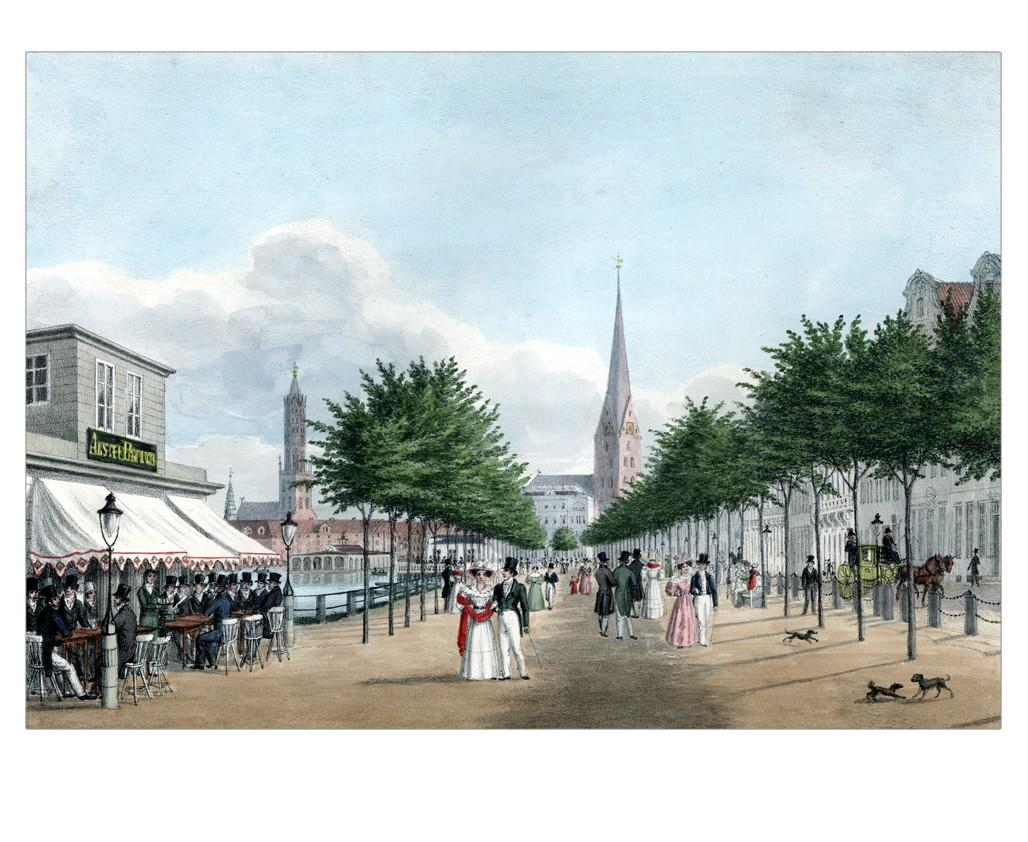
The Jungfernstieg

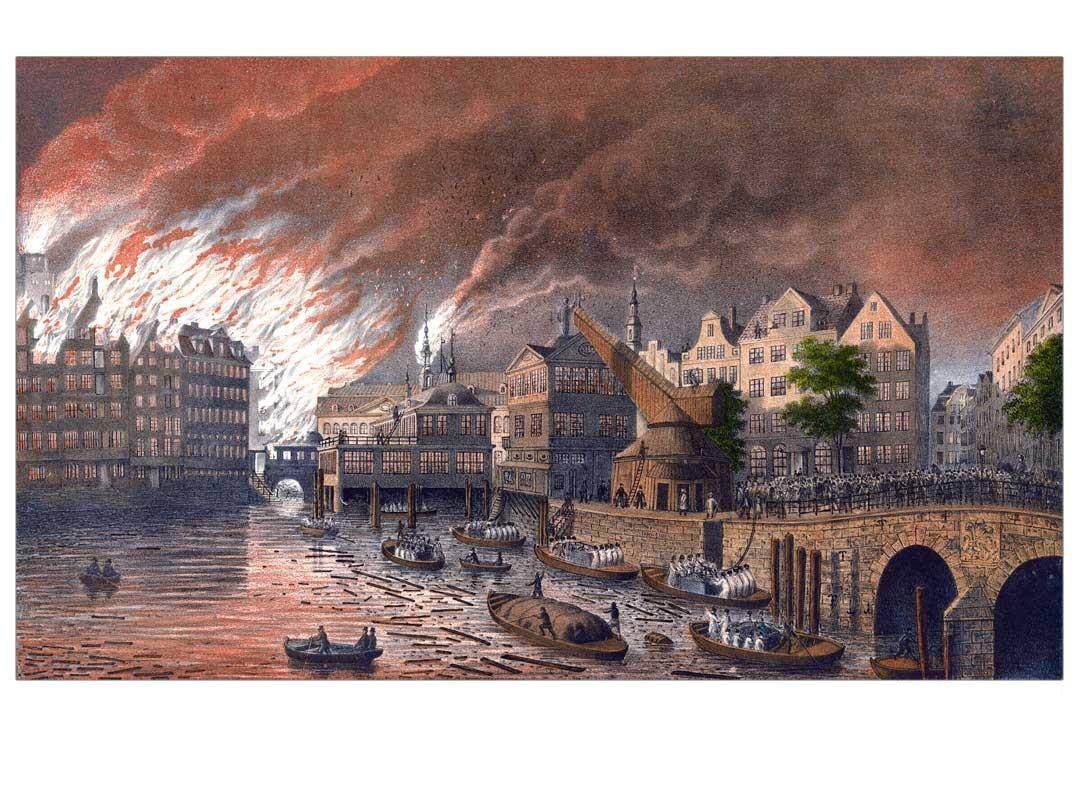
The Great Fire of Hamburg

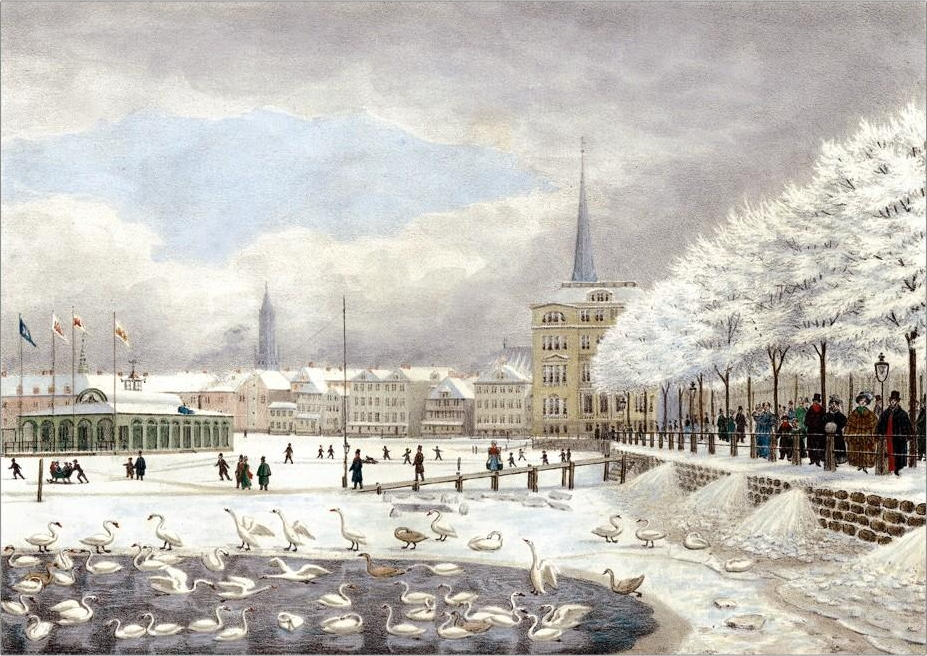
Winter view of the Alster, near the Jungfernstieg
