= Heinrich Emanuel Merck =

German pharmacist (1794–1855)

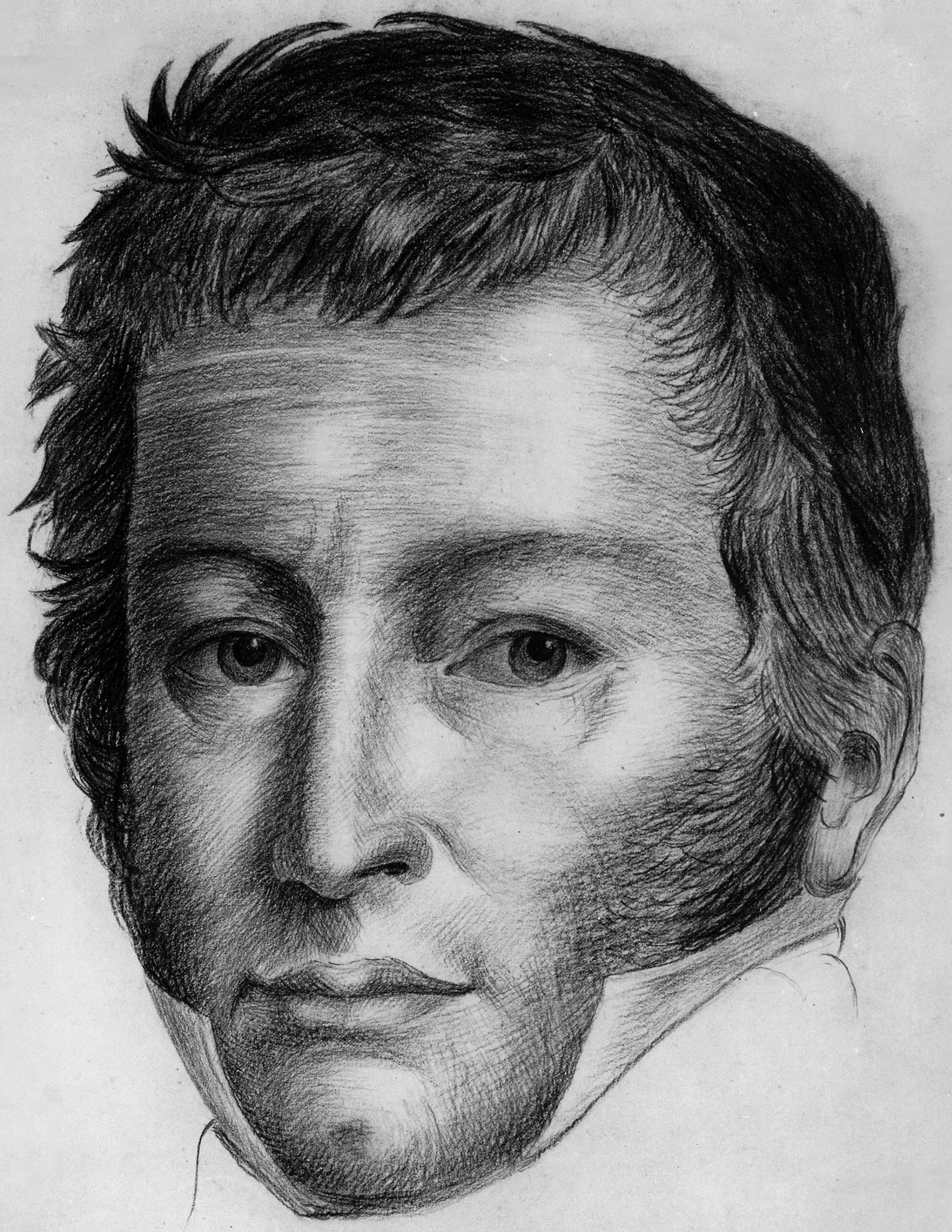
Heinrich Emanuel Merck

Heinrich Emanuel Merck (15 September 1794 – 14 February 1855) was an apothecary whose descendants are the founders of Merck and Company and Merck KGaA.

== Biography ==
He was a direct descendant of company founder Friedrich Jacob Merck, who had purchased the Engel-Apotheke (Angel Pharmacy) in Darmstadt in 1668. The pharmacy is still part of Merck KGaA, but the original building was destroyed during World War II in the bombing campaigns, and therefore it is a new construction.

Merck studied pharmacy in Berlin and Vienna. He then worked at his father's Engel-Apotheke. In 1816 he took over management. In addition to this he was occupied with research on the chemical constitution of herbal natural material.

He isolated alkaloids and prepared them in a pure state. In 1827, Merck sold all the known alkaloids to other pharmacists, chemists and physicians. From 1838 until 1841 he ran a candle factory and became a member of the town council of Darmstadt in 1828. As a court consultant he was working on the homicide case of the Mistress of Görlitz in 1850. At the time of Merck's death, ca. 23–50 workers were employed at his chemical-pharmaceutical factory. His three sons took over his business.

== Engel-Apotheke ==
- Friedrich Jacob Merck in the 17th century
- Heinrich Emanuel Merck (1794–1855) from 1816–c.1855

== See also ==
- Merck family
- Emanuel Merck Lectureship
