= Deichstraße =

Street in Hamburg, Germany

Coordinates: 53°32′46″N 9°59′14″E

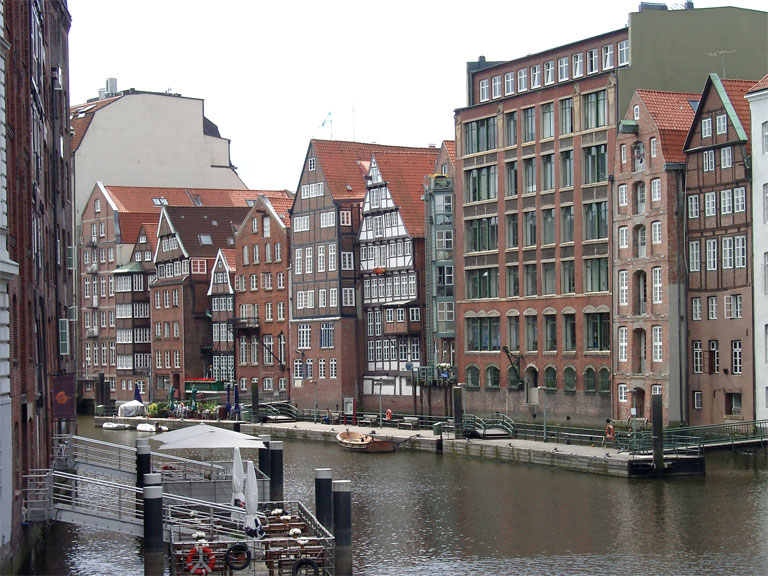
Canal-side view of houses in Deichstraße.

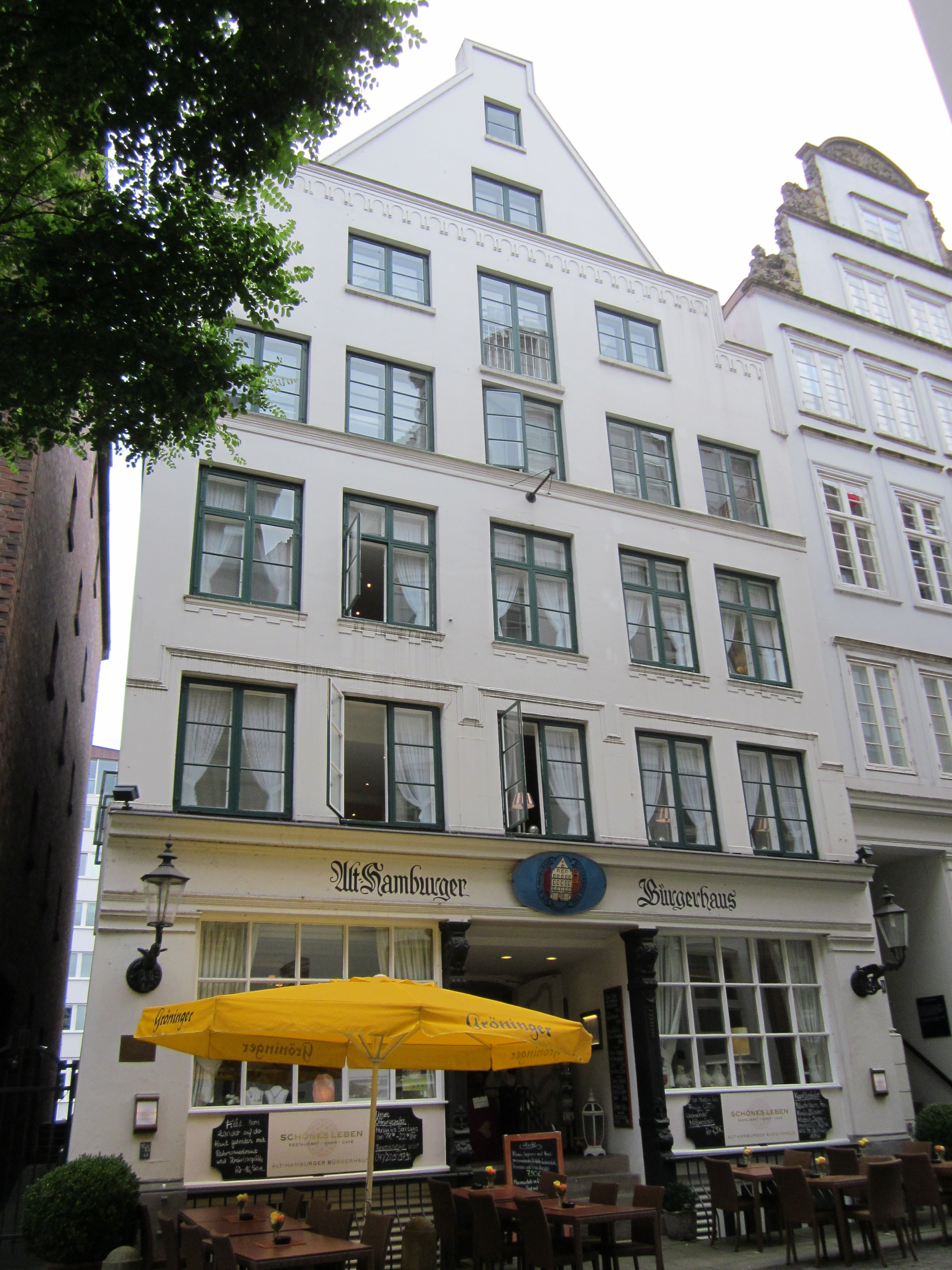
Typical house in the Deichstraße.

Deichstraße (lit. "dike street") is the oldest remaining street in the Altstadt of Hamburg, Germany and a popular visitor attraction in the city.

Deichstraße dates back to the 14th century; it was first mentioned in 1304. Located adjacent to Nikolaifleet and close to the Speicherstadt, it now contains carefully restored 17th–19th-century houses, all that is left of the old harbour district. The Great Fire of 1842 broke out in Deichstraße 42 and destroyed many of the original buildings, but spared the southern end of the street spreading - driven by the wind - mostly northeastwards. Today, Deichstraße –along with Neustadt's Peterstraße– contains some of the oldest buildings in the city, including the oldest warehouse, at Peterstraße 27, built in 1780.

== Sources ==
- Wolfgang Rudhard. Das Bürgerhaus in Hamburg. Das deutsche Bürgerhaus 21. Tübingen: Wasmuth, 1975. ISBN 3-8030-0023-8 (in German)
