= Cremon =

- Island
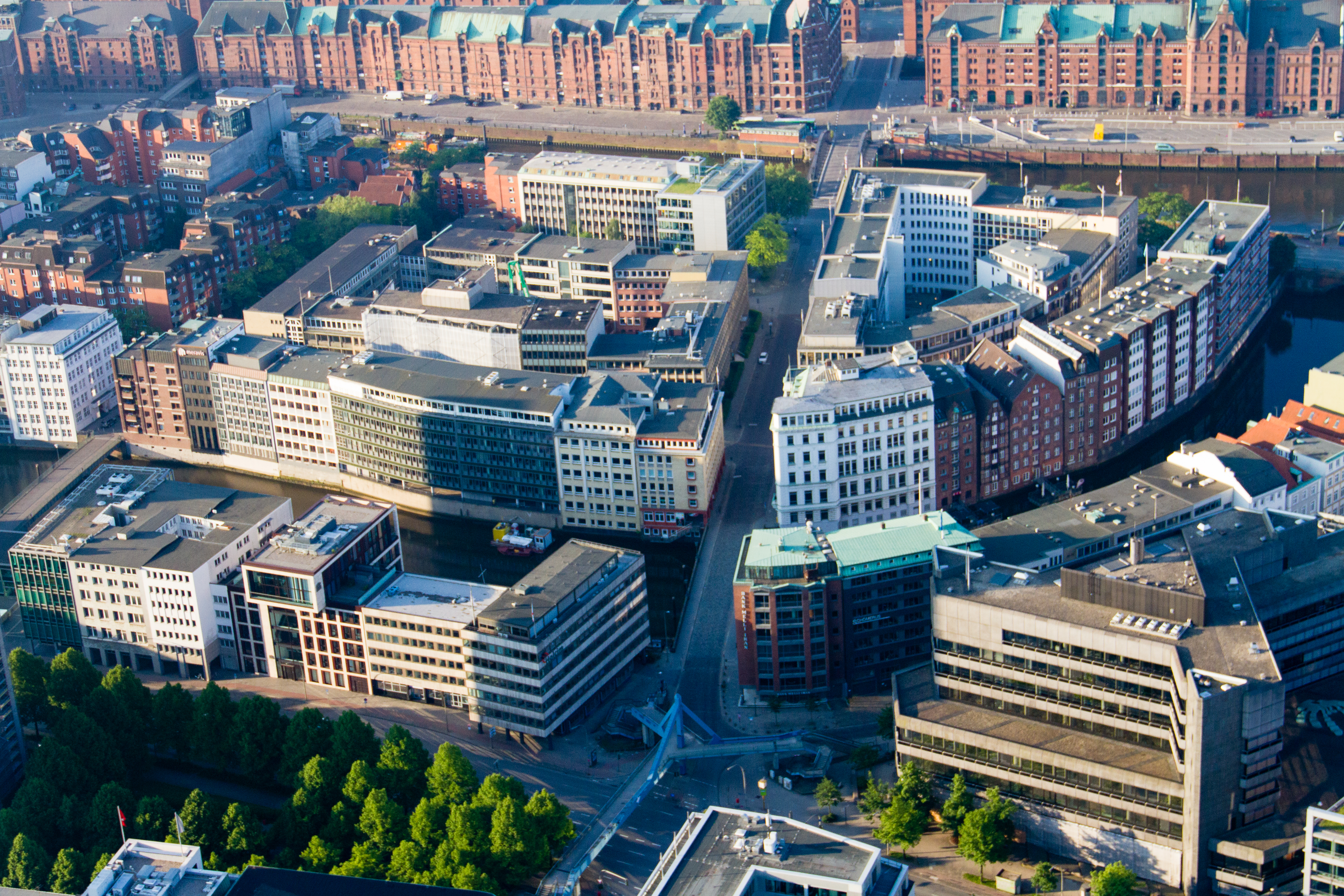
- Aerial view
- Interactive map of Cremon
- Coordinates: 53.5454°N 9.9908°E
- Country: Germany
- City: Hamburg

Cremon was a marsh island in the Alster river at Hamburg, Germany. Today the site is marked by a street of the same name, in the Altstadt of Hamburg.

The island was the first of the new town, and was outside the former city walls. The land was divided into long, narrow plots, on which typical Hamburg merchant houses were built. Each plot had access to the waterway later called Nikolaifleet. Behind the houses was a waterway called the Katharinenfleet, which was filled in during 1946. The waterway separating Cremon from the neighbouring island of Grimm, the Steckelhörnfleet, was also filled in after World War II.

In 1246 Cremon was absorbed by the city of Hamburg, and together with Grimm formed the parish of the newly built St. Catherine's Church.

The origin of the name is unclear, it may be traced back to a local farmer. The street name has existed since at least 1251 as Cremun; a 1289, document mentions platea Crymon.

In 1937, having survived the Hamburg fire of 1842 and almost one hundred years of urban development, the designation "hanseatische Traditionsinsel" was obtained.

First restoration work began in 1937, but the whole street fell victim to air raids on Hamburg in 1943.

Still located between Fleet Street and Cremon 33-36 (formerly outer dike), is the last of the old historic warehouse of the 18th and early 19th century.
