= Friedrich Jacob Merck =

German pharmacist

- Born: February 18, 1621; Schweinfurt
- Died: 1678; Darmstadt
- Occupation: pharmacist
- Known for: founding Merck

Friedrich Jacob Merck (18 February 1621—1678) was a German pharmacist and a member of the Merck family. He was the founder of the world's oldest pharmaceutical company, now known as the Merck Group, which was established in 1668.

== Biography ==
Friedrich Jacob Merck was the son of Johann Merck (1573–1642), an innkeeper from Schweinfurt who ran the Zum Schwarzen Bären inn and who was a member of the city council. He did an apprenticeship in the Ratsapotheke in his hometown. He first owned a pharmacy in Wesselburen, before moving to Darmstadt. In 1668 he acquired the second city pharmacy there, the Engel-Apotheke, which became the start of the Merck company.

Friedrich Jacob Merck died in 1678 without any descendants. He had chosen his nephew Georg Friedrich Merck (1647–1715) as his successor.

== Brothers and sisters ==
Friedrich Jacob Merck had many siblings from his father's three marriages:

- Johann Jacob Merck (1599–1599)
- Anna Dorothea Merck (1600–1633)
- Johann Hartmann Merck (1602–1672)
- Anna Cordula Merck (1606–1611)
- Anna Margaretha Merck (1611–1611)
- Georg Merck (1611–1683) – pharmacist and father of pharmacist Georg Friedrich Merck.
- Johann Christoph Merck (1614–1679)
- Anna Rosina Merck (1616–1616)
- Anna Maria Merck (1618–1681), in 1641 got married Johann Georg Biegmann (1613–1671).
- Johannes Merck (1623–1684)
- Amalia Elisabetha Merck (1628–1666), in 1649 got married Michael Engelhardt (1607–1675).

== See also ==
- Merck family
