= George W. Merck =

American chemist (1894–1957)

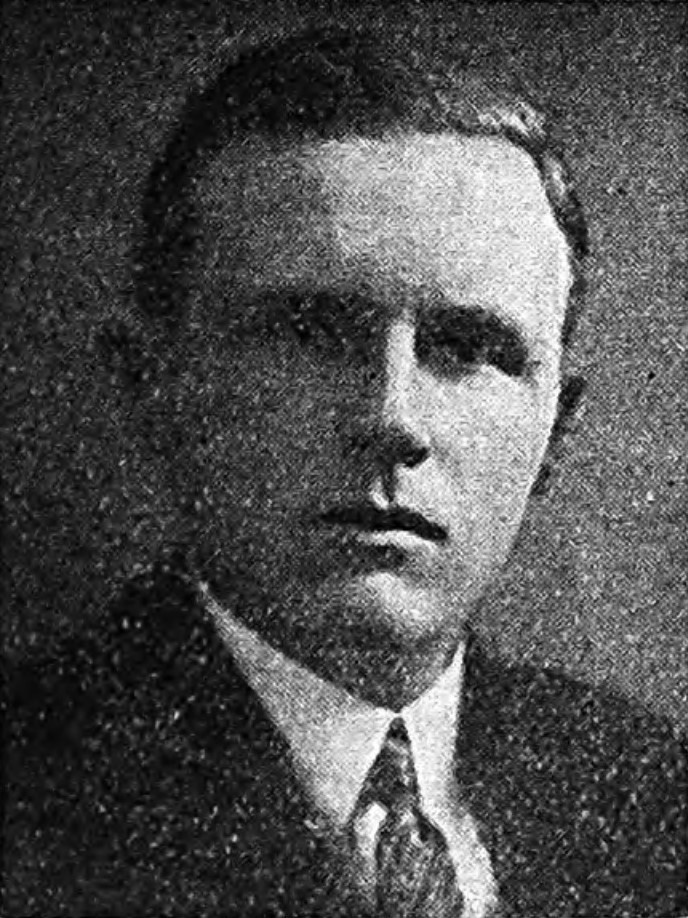
Merck in a 1927 publication

George Wilhelm Herman Emanuel Merck (March 29, 1894 – November 9, 1957) was the president of Merck & Co. from 1925 to 1950 and a member of the Merck family.

== Early life ==
George W. Merck was born in New York City, to George Friedrich and Friedrike (Schenck) Merck. His father had emigrated from Germany in 1891 to oversee the new office of E. Merck and Company at 62 Wall Street. He was raised in Llewellyn Park, New Jersey, where he had access to Thomas Edison's workshop. He graduated from Harvard College with a B.S. in chemistry in 1915. Both his parents were Christians. While there, he edited The Harvard Lampoon.

== Career ==
World War I prevented him from pursuing an advanced degree in Germany. Instead, he joined his father at the company. He was made president of the company in 1925, succeeding his father shortly before his death, while his father became chairman of the board. During the interwar years, he oversaw Merck's involvement in the development of synthetic vitamins, sulfas, antibiotics, and hormones. During World War II, he led the War Research Service, which initiated the U.S. biological weapons program with Frank Olson. After relinquishing the title of president, he remained chairman of the board of directors until his death in 1957. He was on the cover of Time magazine on August 18, 1952, illustrating a story about the American drug industry.

== Philanthropy ==
In 1951, Merck donated 2600 acres of forest and farmland to be used for public use. This tract of land is in Rupert, Vermont. After his death, the area was renamed the Merck Forest and Farmland Foundation which seeks to educate about sustainable farming and forest agriculture. It is a popular destination for hikers and campers.

== Honors ==
Merck was awarded the Medal for Merit for his contribution to the war effort, and the Industry Medal of the American Chemical Society, as well as honorary doctorates from several universities. He served as president of the Manufacturing Chemists' Association from 1949 to 1952 and was also on the board of the National Science Foundation.

== Death ==
He died of a cerebral hemorrhage in West Orange, New Jersey. He is interred in the Merck family plot in Orange's Rosedale Cemetery.
