= Maxwell Evarts =

American lawyer & politician (1862–1913)

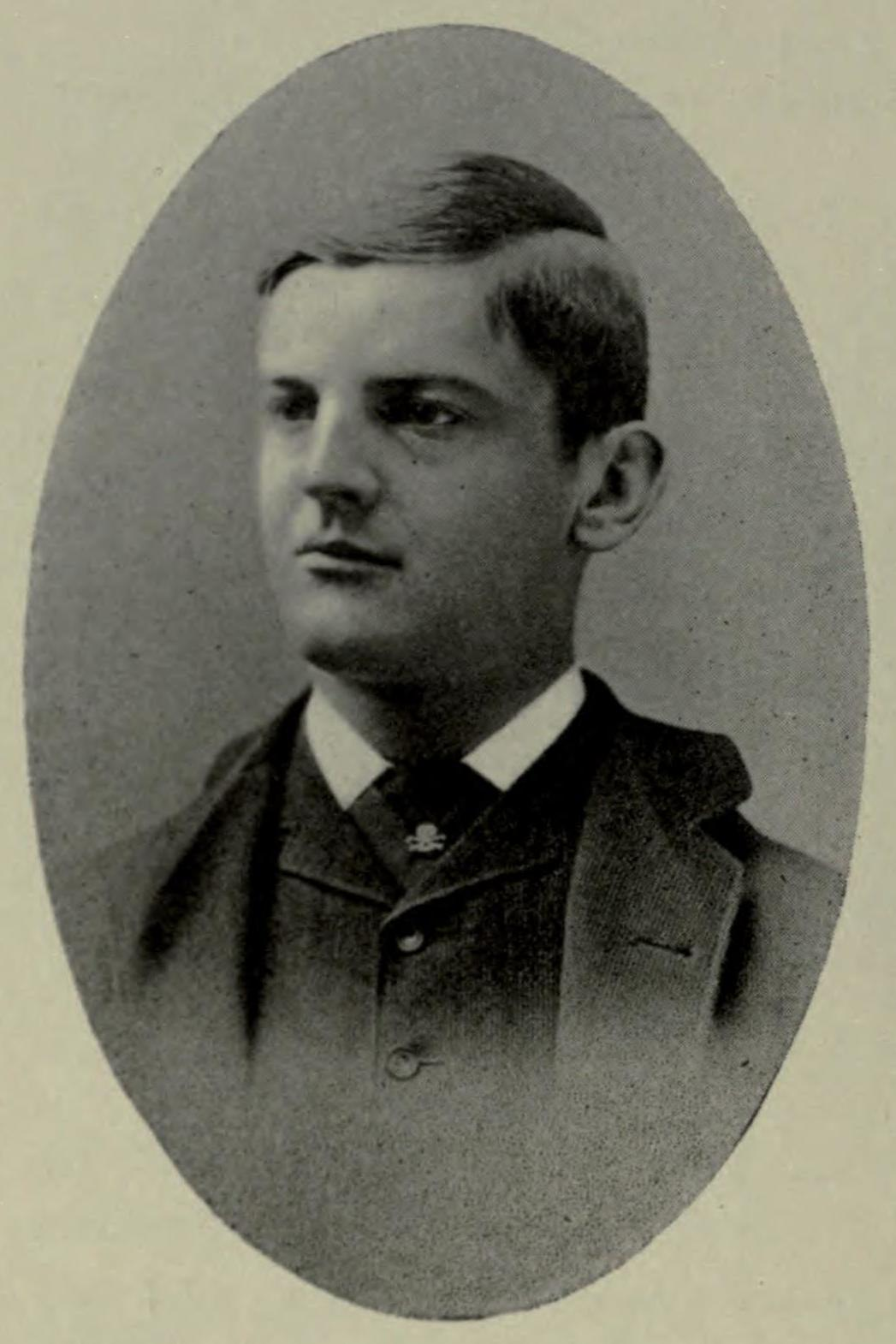
- Maxwell Evarts circa 1884, on his graduation from Yale College

Member of the Vermont House of Representatives from the Windsor County, Windsor district
- In office 1906–1908
- Preceded by: Sherman N. Taylor
- Succeeded by: C. H. Finch

Personal details
- Born: November 15, 1862 New York, New York
- Died: October 7, 1913 (aged 50) Windsor, Vermont
- Education: Yale College, 1884 (Bachelor's); Harvard Law School, JD
- Occupation: Lawyer and legislator

Maxwell Evarts (November 15, 1862 – October 7, 1913) was an American lawyer and politician.

== Early life and education ==
Maxwell Evarts was born on November 15, 1862, in New York City, the youngest of the twelve children of Helen Minerva (Wardner) and William M. Evarts. He attended St. Paul's School, Concord, New Hampshire. He graduated from Yale College, 1884, where he was a member of Skull and Bones. After graduation, he studied for two years at Harvard Law School, and was then in the law office of Seward, DaCosta & Guthrie until summer 1889.

== Career ==
In 1890 he was appointed an assistant United States attorney for the Southern District of New York. He held this office two years, after which he entered the law department of the Southern Pacific Railroad Co. He was counsel to the Southern Pacific Railroad and Union Pacific Railroad, along with co-general counsel Robert Scott Lovett, and for E. H. Harriman. In 1904 he was elected a director of the Southern Pacific Railroad, for several years was an attorney of the Harriman system, and in October 1910 he was made general counsel of the Oregon Short Line and the Oregon Railroad and Navigation Co. Upon the separation of the Union Pacific and Southern Pacific Railroads he became general counsel of the Southern Pacific Co. He was also a director of the Pacific Mail Steamship Co. and the Union Pacific Land Co. He represented Wong Kim Ark in his lawsuit to gain recognition as a U.S. citizen. The Supreme Court sided with Evarts, establishing birthright citizenship as a right.

He was an organizer of the State National Bank of Windsor, which included Vermont State Treasurer John L. Bacon as cashier. He was also vice-president of the Windsor Machine Co., half owner of the Amsden (Vt.) Lime Co., president of the Vermont State Fair Association, a governor of the Morgan Horse Club, and president of the Vermont Fish and Game League. He was a member of the Vermont House of Representatives in 1906.

== Personal life ==
Evarts – on April 23, 1891, in Manhattan, New York – married Margaret Allen Stetson (1866–1937), daughter of Charles Augustus Stetson and Josephine Brick. They had four daughters and a son. He was the son of William M. Evarts, the grandson of Jeremiah Evarts and Allen Wardner, and the great-grandson of Roger Sherman.

Evarts died on October 7, 1913, in Windsor, Vermont.
