= Merk =

Merk may refer to:

- Merk (coin), old Scottish coin worth 13 schillings and 4 pence Scots
- Merkland, old Scottish unit of land measurement
- Mérk, village in eastern Hungary
- Merk, Iran, village in Kurdistan Province, Iran
- Ernst Merk (1903–1976), World War II German army officer
- Frederick Merk (1887–1977), American historian
- Joseph Merk (1795–1852), Austrian cellist and composer
- Kai Merk (born 1998), German-Kyrgyz footballer
- Kimi Merk (born 2004), German-Kyrgyz footballer
- Larisa Merk (born 1971), Russian rower
- Markus Merk (born 1962), German football referee
- Ron Merk, American independent filmmaker
- Waldemar Merk (born 1959), Polish sprint canoer
- Merk (musician) (born 1994), New Zealander indie musician

== See also ==
- Merc (disambiguation)
- Merck (disambiguation)
- Mark (disambiguation)
