= H. J. Merck & Co. =

H. J. Merck & Co. was one of the largest merchant banks in Hamburg, Germany and existed from 1799 (226 years ago) to 1983 (42 years ago). Merck & Co. was also involved in shipping, and co-founded the Hamburg America Line (HAPAG) with Berenberg Bank.

The company was founded by Heinrich Johann Merck, a member of the noted Merck family, who became a Hamburg citizen in 1799. Family members were prominent merchants, bankers and politicians in Hamburg. The family name is currently used by the pharmaceutical companies Merck and Merck & Co. (MSD), which were founded by the Darmstadt branch of the family.

== See also ==
- List of banks in Germany
