= Merck family =

German family of industrialists and bankers

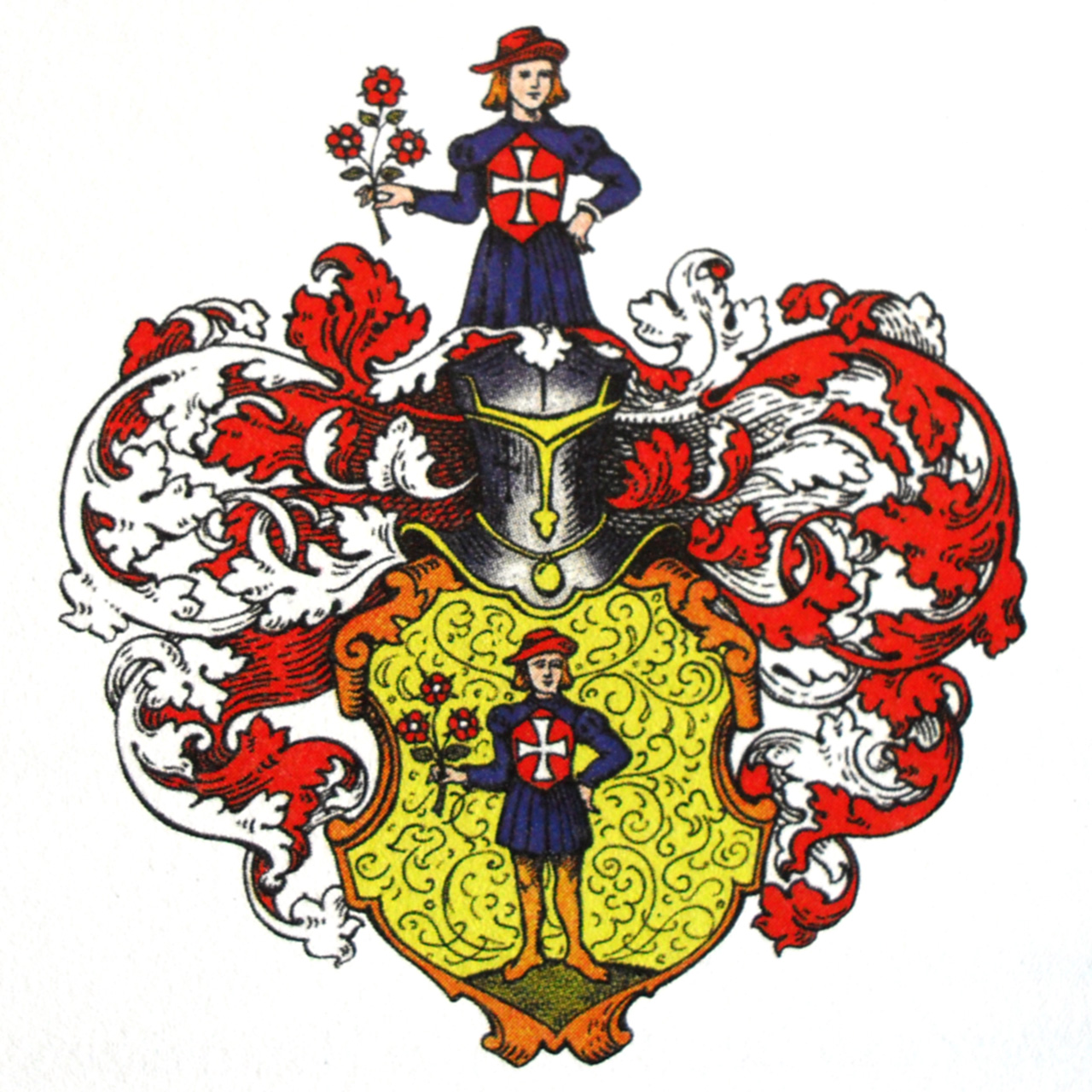
Coat of arms of the Darmstadt branch of the Merck family

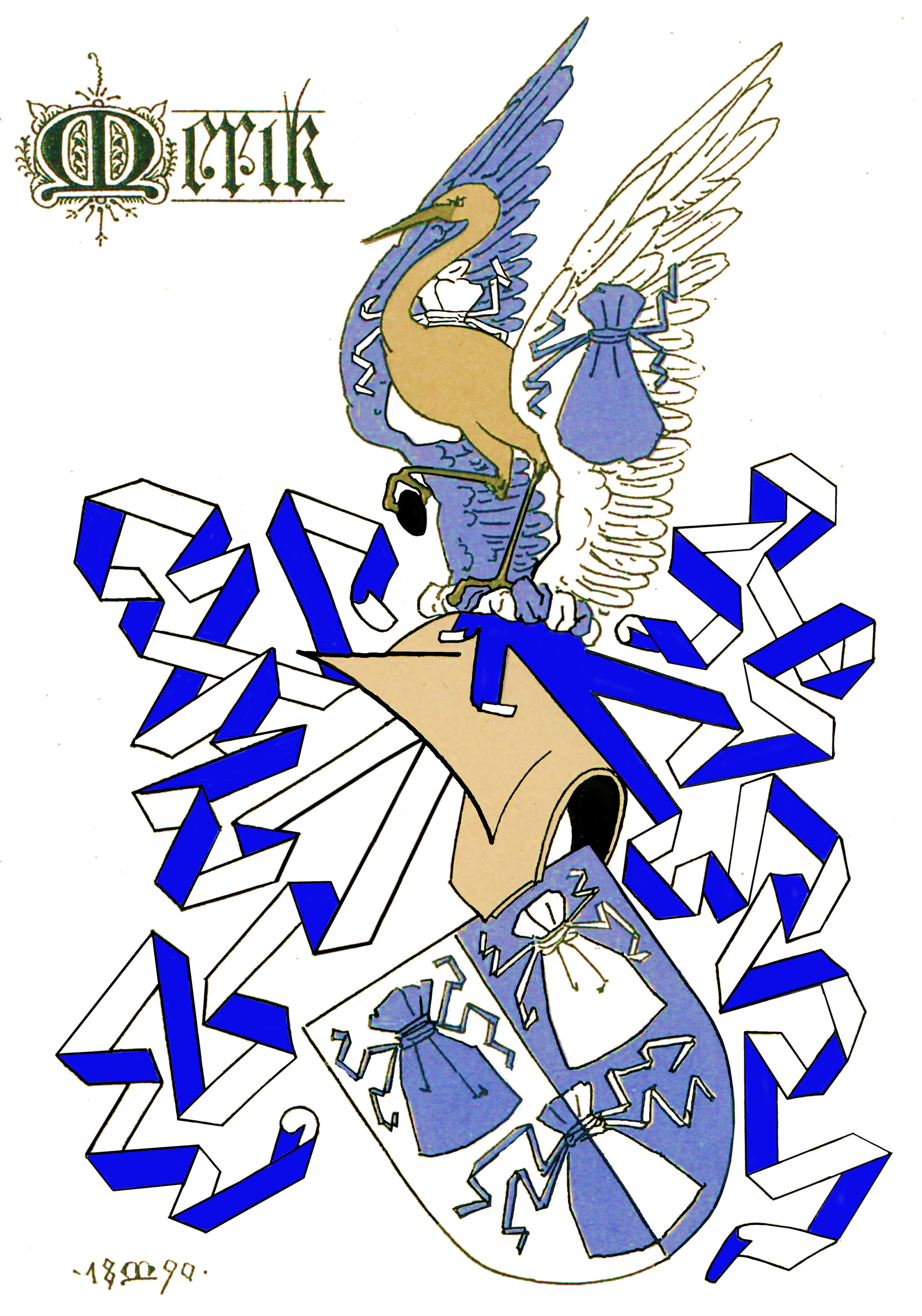
Coat of arms of the Hamburg branch of the Merck family

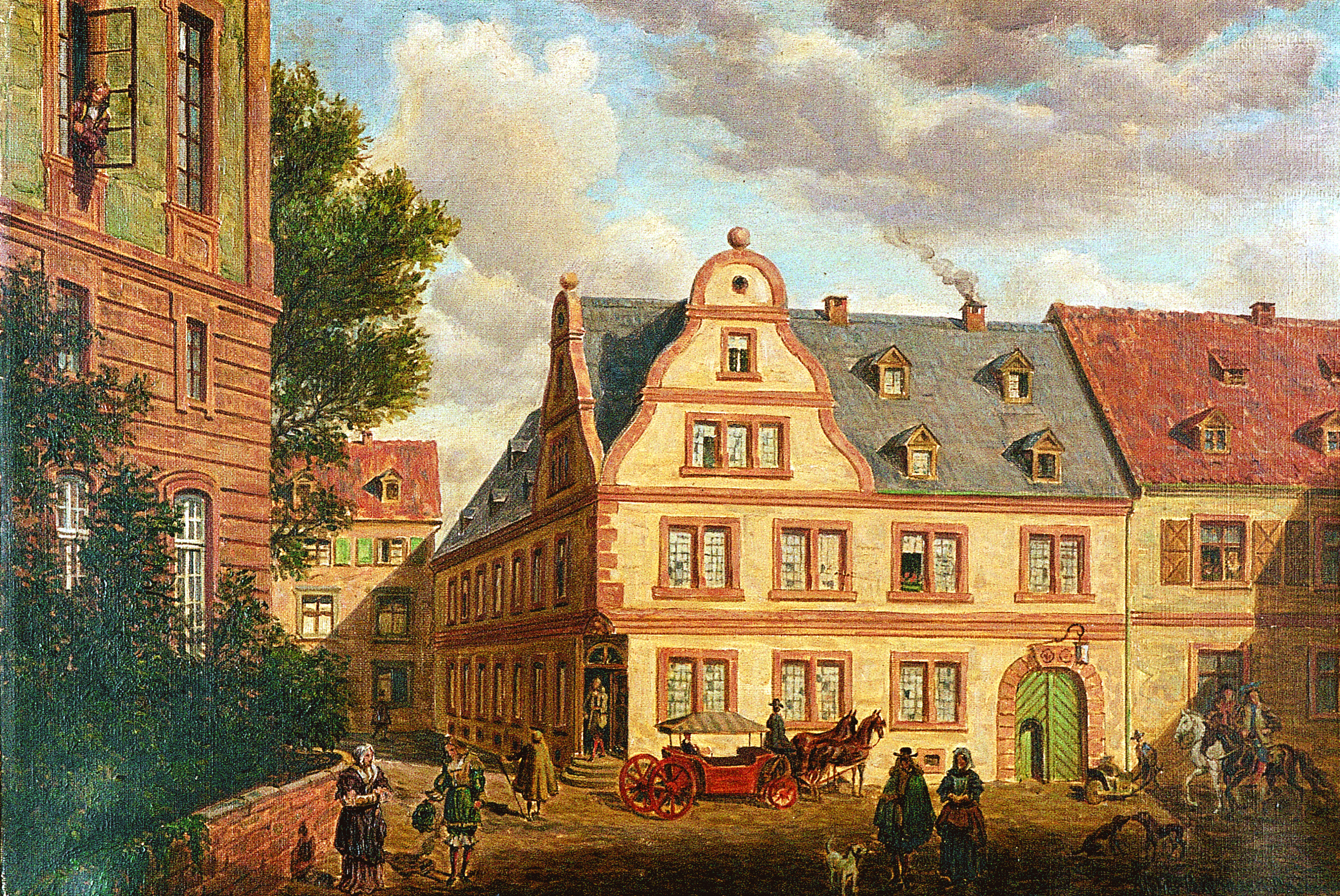
Engel-Apotheke

The Merck family is a German noble family of industrialists and bankers, known for establishing the world's oldest pharmaceutical company Merck, its American former subsidiary Merck & Co. (MSD), which is now an independent company, as well as the Hamburg merchant bank H. J. Merck & Co. The family still owns the majority of the pharmaceutical company Merck, making them one of the richest families in the world with an estimated wealth of more than $80 billion.

== History ==
The family first appeared in Hammelburg in the 15th century. The family has a long history in pharmacy going back to the 17th century, starting in 1668 when Friedrich Jacob Merck bought a pharmacy in Darmstadt. The Merck family controls a majority of 70.3% of the company's shares. An American former subsidiary of the Merck company, Merck & Co. (MSD), was also established by the Merck family and still carries the family's name, but, unlike its former parent company, is no longer owned by the Merck family, since it was nationalized by the American government in 1917 because of World War I and the Trading with the Enemy Act of 1917 and the stock was bought back by George F. Merck in 1919. Merck & Co. was also led by family member George W. Merck (son of George F. Merck) from 1925 until 1950. During the Nazi era the family maintained a close relationship with the Nazi Party.

A branch of the family descended from Heinrich Johann Merck (1770–1853) belonged to Hamburg's ruling class of Hanseatic merchants. His family founded the merchant bank H. J. Merck & Co. and several family members served as senators in Hamburg, while his son Carl Merck (1809–1880) was Syndicus (foreign affairs head) of Hamburg 1847–1880. Another son, the merchant banker Ernst Merck, who had been the Austrian consul-general in Hamburg, was ennobled by the Austrian emperor Franz Joseph I in 1860 and received the title of Baron.

== Family members ==
- Friedrich Jacob Merck
- Heinrich Emanuel Merck
- George W. Merck
- Albert W. Merck, politician
- Timothy and Elizabeth Merck, founders of the Merck Family's Old World Christmas
- Frank Stangenberg-Haverkamp
- Johannes Freiherr von Baillou
- Jon Baumhauer
- Frank Binder, Swiss businessman, founder of the Ulyssia residential superyacht project and member of Merck KGaA's supervisory board
