= Accession of Hamburg to the Zollverein =

The accession of the city state of Hamburg to the German Customs Union, commonly known as Zollverein, in 1888 (along with Bremen) was the culmination of a project for the economic and monetary union of Germany, stretching back to 1819. In that year Schwarzburg-Sondershausen joined Prussia’s internal customs union, the first other state to do so and the first of many to follow.

When the German Customs Union was initially formed, in the 1830s and 1840s, the motives of the states in joining did not include any particular desire to unite with others to form a wider more powerful entity. The states which joined fought vigorously against any impairment of their full sovereignty. Hence each member had a veto and the union was not permanent, but had to be renewed after 12 years. Each member sought its own economic advantage. Accordingly, the accession of any of the Hanseatic cities of Hamburg, Bremen or Lübeck would have to be on condition that accession served the city's own advantage. A pre-condition of such advantage was that their territory touched directly with that of the Customs Union, which only happened for Hamburg after 1854, when Hanover joined. However Hamburg kept an open frontier with Holstein until 1867, when it was included in the Customs Union on being annexed to Prussia. But, after these accessions, other factors came into play as regards the question of Hamburg joining.

== Origins of Free Trade in Hamburg ==
In 1189 the Holy Roman Emperor Frederick Barbarossa granted Hamburg the status of an Imperial Free City and tax-free access along the Lower Elbe into the North Sea, free of any tariffs and duties, etc. The rights were given orally for Hamburg's support of Frederick's participation in the crusades. The written charter containing these rights, although dated 7 May 1189, actually originated in the 1360s, during a dispute between Hamburg and the Archbishop of Bremen over duties on the Elbe.

In the year 1038, the emperor Conrad II granted rights to the Archbishop of Bremen to establish a fair at Stade, a small town on the Elbe 25 miles downstream of Hamburg. This included the right to charge duties on commodities for sale at the fair or landed at Stade for that purpose. The Archbishops abused this privilege and, purporting to have a compulsory market at Stade, exacted a duty on all vessels passing by that town. However, the citizens of Hamburg were exempt by the 1189 grant of Frederick Barbarossa.

In 1648 the dominions of the Bremen archbishopric passed to Sweden, who continued this toll as an established customary right. As this was disputed, in 1691 a Convention to regulate the toll was agreed between Hamburg and Sweden. In 1725, the territory and the toll passed to the Electorate (later Kingdom) of Hanover, who enforced the collection with a ship at Brunshausen on the Elbe, at its confluence with the tributary river Schwinge.

Despite the exemption for Hamburg's ships, this toll was a great inconvenience to commerce and in 1861 Hanover agreed by treaty to abolish the toll in exchange for compensation, one third provided by Hamburg, one third by Britain and one third by other countries affected. Thus was brought about toll free access for Hamburg's trade.

== Bremen’s Proposals for Customs Union ==
Bremen had similar interests to Hamburg, but because of its more westerly position, it was affected by competition from the Dutch ports. These gained advantage from the trade treaty made in 1839 between the German Customs Union and Holland. To avoid this problem, the Senate of Bremen made two proposals in 1839 and 1842 to extend the Customs Union to the coast. They not only proposed the elimination of the differential duties in favour of Holland, but also the imposition of a protective duty on all goods imported by non-union ships, the establishment of joint consulates for the protection of economic interests abroad, which up to that time could only be very deficient due to the large number of different states, and a common trade flag of all the ships belonging to the union.

There was some encouragement from Hamburg initially and Prussia was in favour. However, by 1845, when Prussia stated its position, the Senate of Hamburg expressed itself in a memorandum very vigorously against such ideas. It invoked the free-trade argument that every protective tariff is an unjust burden on the many to benefit the few. In this case, in favour to the union vessels, to which all the consumers of imported articles, as well as the exporting producers, would have to pay monopoly prices for sea transport. The Hamburg Senate did not wish to know anything about a common flag either: it was in the interests of the Hanseatic cities that they retain their own flags, and thus present themselves abroad as neutral trade republics, even if German states went to war with other countries. Likewise, joint consulates were unacceptable as it would be difficult for them to represent the multifarious interests of the participating states.

== Distance from the coast as a motive for joining the Customs Union ==
Although 1834 is the official date of the Customs Union's establishment, member states in fact joined at various times over several decades. This was because the benefits of becoming a member of the union increased, both as it grew in economic size and in its geographic spread.

A state's accession to the Customs Union was related to the distance to the coast because that gave access to international markets. States more distant from the coast joined earlier. Not being a member of the Customs Union mattered more for the states of south Germany, since the external tariff of the Customs Union prevented customs-free access to the coast. Thus, by 1836, all states to the south of Prussia had joined the Customs Union (except Austria, which had its own coast).

For the southern states the Alps effectively blocked off trade to ports in the south, leaving routes through the Customs Union as the only option. In contrast, Hanover formed its own customs union - the “Tax Union” or Steuerverein - in 1834 with Brunswick and with Oldenburg in 1836. The external tariffs on finished goods and overseas raw materials and were below the rates of the Zollverein. Brunswick joined the Zollverein Customs Union in 1842. Hanover finally joined in 1854. Hanover was compensated for this with a premium on its share of customs revenues (as normally calculated). Facing isolation, Oldenburg followed suit in 1854. Holstein and Lauenburg were annexed by Prussia after the war in 1866, leading to an accession of their territories into the Customs Union, while Mecklenburg and the city states of Hamburg and Bremen, who engaged heavily in international trade, joined only in 1867 and 1888, respectively.

== Risk of Dissolution of the Customs Union ==
Another factor for the Hanseatic states was the suspicion that the Customs Union might not endure, even for the 12 years (renewable) specified in the treaties. If their present trade relations with Scandinavia and Russia were to change after accession to the union because of customs duties, they were not likely to be resumed, should the Customs union be dissolved after a few years, and they returned to the free market. By that time the trade would probably be lost to English competition.

This changed with the establishment of the North German Federation in 1867. Instead of the old international treaties, a constitution bound the states together and solidified the union. Thus the fears of the Hanseatic cities had become groundless. But now it became clear that the other grounds alone were strong enough to keep them away from the Customs Union.

== Joins North German Federation, 1867 ==
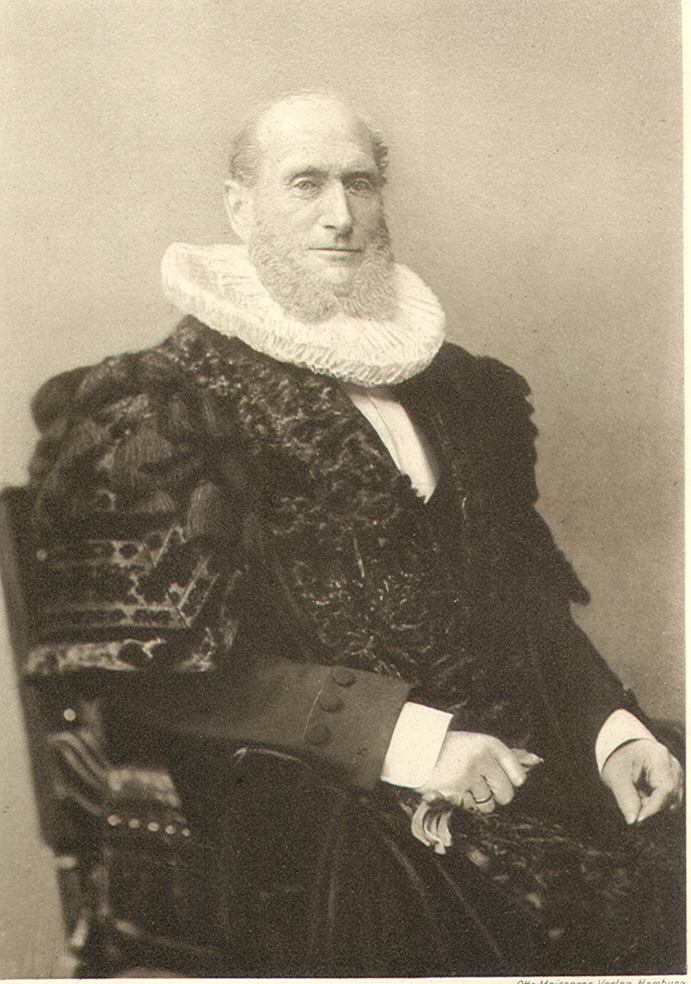
Gustav Kirchenpauer

Following the Second Schleswig War of 1864, Schleswig and Holstein became a Prusso-Austrian condominium, with Prussia occupying the former and Austria the latter, but on 8 June 1866, Prussian general Von Manteuffel crossed the river Eider into Holstein, which bordered Hamburg on the north. Having warned Austria he was exercising Prussia's condominate right to establish garrisons in some unoccupied points of Holstein, Austria decided to withdraw from Holstein without forcing a military conflict. However it requested the Federal Diet (Bundestag) of the German Confederation to mobilise militarily against Prussia. When the Diet was convoked (11 June), Austria moved that all Federal military contingents except Prussia's be mobilised. Prussia responded by laying before the Diet a scheme of reform of ten articles, the most salient being the exclusion of Austria from the Confederation and the election of a representative body in the remainder; Prussia moved its immediate adoption. The Diet voted on the Austrian proposal on 14 June, which was carried by nine votes to six. The three Hanseatic cities, through their joint envoy Friedrich Krüger, voted against the Austrian proposal and made a declaration (formulated by Lübeck) that the events in Holstein did not justify Federal mobilisation, because the danger of immediate military collision had passed. Then on 16 June, Emil von Richthofen, the Prussian envoy to the Hanseatic states, presented to the Hamburg Senate and other German governments an "identical note" asking for an alliance on the basis of Prussia's reform proposal placed before the Diet and requesting that its troops be placed at the disposal Prussia. On 21 June, representatives of the Hanseatic cities met in Hamburg to discuss the measures demanded by Prussia. Richthofen also took part.

On 24 June, Richthofen met two prominent members of the House of Burgesses (Burgerschaft), Isaac Wolffson (former President of that chamber and member of the Right party) and Johannes Halben (leader of the Left party), to inform them of the intended rejection of the Prussian proposals by the Senate. He pointed out that Prussia would not accept a refusal without further action. He mentioned that Prussia would dissolve the Senate and take over the government. The Burgerschaft would remain undisturbed, as would the population, if they kept quiet. Otherwise, 10,000 Prussian troops would occupy the city. Wolffson and Halben reported this to Syndicus Carl Merck, who directed Hamburg's foreign affairs, who now sent Krüger, then in Hamburg, to Richthofen to obtain certainty about the Prussian threats.

Merck addressed the Senate on 25 June saying he regarded the policy of Lübeck, which was positive to the Prussian alliance and the threats of Richthofen as particularly serious considerations. He was afraid that, after the accession of all other north German states to the alliance, Hamburg would stand isolated and its independence threatened. Then on 26 June the Senate gave way. Merck instructed the Hamburg envoy in London to seek understanding in Britain for the forced connection to Prussia and thereby to preserve the benefit of Hamburg's good relations with Britain. Then, exhausted, a nervous breakdown compelled him to hand over the business to Senator Kirchenpauer.

When Merck recovered, he tried to convince the Burgerschaft of the inevitability of the decision. The day after the Austrian defeat at the Battle of Königgrätz, on 4 July, the Senate submitted to the Burgerschaft the following urgent requests: (i) assent to the Prussian alliance, (ii) continue of the joint Brigade with Oldenburg, Bremen and Lübeck, and (iii) authorise the costs of mobilisation. The House assented by 113 votes to 54. On 5 July Merck informed Richthofen that Hamburg approved her accession to the Prussian alliance and in August, two battalions of Hamburg troops were sent to Frankfurt to replace some Prussian troops in that area.

On 18 August, the Hanseatic Minister-Resident in Berlin, Friedrich Geffcken, signed a treaty between Hamburg and Prussia (of one-year duration) concluding the alliance. Under this treaty, all troops were placed under Prussian supreme command, the two states agreed to hold elections to an imperial parliament and their plenipotentiaries (along with those of other signatories of the alliance) would meet later in Berlin to draft a constitution, as soon as Prussia requested it. This request was made in December 1866 and Senator Kirchenpauer was sent to represent Hamburg. On 15 December, the draft constitution was presented to the plenipotentiaries assembled in Berlin. Kirchenpauer wrote:

"The draft carries the guise of a federation, not a constitution of a single state. It speaks not of provinces, but of states and places the Federal Council and the Federal Parliament at the top. However, when one looks carefully at the provisions, the Federal Presidium, which belongs to the crown of Prussia, is emperor or more than an emperor, while the rulers of the states are mediatised, and the city senates reduced to the status of magistrates (city councils). From them are taken military sovereignty and that which makes them appear abroad as state governments - flags, consulates, posts, telegraphs, railroads, trade agreements, and so on. At the same time, the military budget is issued from the Prussian Chambers and only appears in the Federal Parliament in the broadest terms. Thus imperialism in all directions."

The Hamburg Senate desired to retain its own 279 consulates or, at least, participate in the appointment of consuls and retain the right of direct correspondence and instruction. Hamburg's commercial consuls had the advantage of being more established in the various states and of having good relations with their leading personalities. Also, Hamburg's neutrality was necessary for its commercial interests, and since it had not been allied with any major power, it remained unmolested by all their quarrels.

But Bismarck claimed the Hanseatic cities were accorded a particularly favourable position, but instead of an appreciation of this, Kirchenpauer treated the proposals with "the narrowest particularism, a clinging to special institutions, eschewing the handling of common burdens", more so than any of the monarchies. Bismarck said that Prussia attempted to compromise as far as possible, but unity had to be pursued, not the preservation of exceptional rights. Merck should therefore give instructions to Hamburg's representative which are compatible with the purpose intended by Prussia. Bismarck supported this intimidation by a press campaign against Kirchenpauer, also by halting the negotiations on Hamburg's postal arrangements. In this tense situation, the Senate thought it better to refrain from responding to a telegram from Bismarck and instead send a reply already drafted by Merck.

Eventually, the negotiations of the north German plenipotentiaries were concluded in February 1867 and the Senate had to decide whether or not to approve the draft constitution. It agreed that a general rejection of the Constitution was precluded, since the consequences of such a step could not be overlooked. After changes to the draft constitution by the provisional north German parliament, the plenipotentiaries approved the amended constitution on 16 April 16. The Senate's message to the Burgerschaft (drafted by Kirchenpauer) asked them to consent, even though it did not correspond to the wishes of all concerned. The Hamburg Senate, like others, had to give up essential parts of its state independence, but this was necessary to achieve an agreement. The Burgerschaft ratified the constitution on 15 May 15, 1867 and it came into force on 1 July 1, 1867, founding the North German Federation.

== Constitution of the North German Federation ==
Although Hamburg joined the North German Federation, it remained outside the Customs Union. The federation's constitution included special arrangements for Hamburg and the other Hanseatic cities:

Article 34: The Hanseatic cities of Lübeck, Bremen and Hamburg with appropriate districts for this purpose or their surrounding area, shall remain as free ports outside the Community customs border until they apply for their inclusion in the same.

Article 38: The yield of the customs duties and the excise duties specified in Art. 35 flows into the Federal Treasury. Following clauses defining “yield”, it continued: The areas outside the Community customs border contribute to federal expenditure through the payment of an Aversum (a specific discretionary lump sum).

Also Article 35 specified that the Federation had exclusive charge of measures required in areas outside the Customs Union to secure the common customs border.

== The Aversum ==
After the founding of the North German Federation, Kirchenpauer and Versmann went to Berlin in the summer of 1867 to negotiate the Aversum.

The North German Federation was funded by (a) customs duties forming the common external tariff and (b) consumption taxes (tax on spending on goods and services). Non-members of the Customs Union instead paid a compensatory lump sum into the Federal Treasury, which was legally regarded as a complete substitute for the indirect taxes which had not been paid. The Aversum consisted of two parts.

Firstly, each year the total customs and consumption tax income was divided by the population of the Customs Union, then applied pro rata to the population of each Hanseatic city living outside the customs line. Secondly, a supplement was added, per head of the population of these free zones. The Aversum supplement was in 1867 set at 2.21 marks per inhabitant, 1872 to 3 marks per capita, and from 1880 to 5 marks, after the Customs Union adopted a high tariff.

The Aversum, therefore, was directly dependent on level of customs duties and tax rates. The provisions governing the payment of the Aversum justified the full voting rights of Hamburg and Bremen in the North German Federation. It was up to city states how they wanted to raise these sums.

On account of its special circumstances, Lübeck found it well in 1868 to submit the application as foreseen in Article 34 and join the Customs Union.

== Relations with the Customs Union after 1867 ==
In one respect the tariff treatment of the Hanseatic cities differed from that of the rest of the foreign countries. Offices of the Customs Union were set up in the free areas of Hamburg and Bremen to perform customs clearance, avoiding the need for it at the destination or an intermediate station.

The fact that an area is excluded from the customs frontier does not in itself mean that it must also be outside the tax frontier. For example, the Imperial Stamp Duty, which was not a consumption tax, was applied in the Hanseatic states as well as the Customs Union.

For consumption taxes the Hanseatic cities were treated like other foreign states. The brandy or sugar supplier in the Customs Union received an export remuneration upon dispatch to Hamburg. This was passed on to the Hamburg consumer who received the Customs Union product free of Customs Union tax and, the reduction was not negated by any high import tariff or consumption tax levied by Hamburg. Thus Hamburg consumers had lower prices than consumers within the union.

The German imperial constitution of 1871 brought no change in the legal situation of Hamburg and Bremen. Article 34 (and related provisions) went into the new constitution.

== Customs frontier ==
City state of Hamburg 1867-1888. Free zone outside the Customs Union: yellow. Areas within the Customs Union: pink

After Hamburg had agreed to the constitution of the North German Federation, negotiations were held between November 1867 and March 1868 on the size of the free area. It was agreed that this would cover the Hamburg urban area, but not the outlying areas, including Ritzebuttel, Bergedorf and the Vierland (which were a condominium with Lübeck until January 1868), Waldvörfer, and some Elbe islands. The excluded area, covering about 130 square miles with 25,000 inhabitants, now fell inside to the Customs Union.

The free area outside the customs barrier was only 28 square miles, but had a population of about 475,000. The 1868 arrangement required a customs cordon all around the city.

The customs line was drawn according as the locality facilitated customs control. Although Holstein had been annexed by Prussia in 1866, Altona in Holstein remained outside the Customs Union frontier because it flowed completely with the Hamburg urban area.

Already in 1853 Altona was excised from the Danish customs area in Holstein and treated as part of Hamburg for the purposes of raising duty. However, the few and low tariffs of Hanover, Oldenburg, Denmark, and Mecklenburg had caused no difficulties. In 1867 Altona remained with Hamburg for Customs purposes, but now the customs border was that around a protective tariff regime.

In 1853, between Ottensen and Altona, a customs border was established, which ran along the later Haubachstrasse This continued under the 1867 arrangement, so Ottensen was in the economic territory of the Customs Union, but not Altona and Hamburg. As a result, Hamburg enterprises who wished to sell into the Customs Union set-up sites in Ottensen, which then developed into a major industrial location. Within 60 years, the population grew sixteen-fold, from 2,411 in 1840, to 37,738 in 1900.

Enterprises needing to achieve low prices for the world market, and also servicing the not insignificant demand of the inhabitants of the Hamburg-Altona district (578,000 inhabitants in 1885), would site themselves in the free area. Branches of the same company were often sited both within and without the customs border.

The Hamburg-Holstein border cut through houses, roads and gardens and so customs control would have been extremely difficult. This was the reason for outlying areas of Hamburg being incorporated within the customs frontier.

Also outside the Customs Union was most of Wandsbek, a salient of Holstein into the Hamburg urban area.

== End of Hamburg’s own currency ==
Until 1873 Hamburg had its own currency, the Hamburg Mark Courant, divided into 16 schillings, itself divided into 12 Pfennig (pence). On 15 February 1873, accounts were converted to the new single currency of the new empire, at a fixed exchange rate of 1.2 imperial Marks to the Hamburg Mark. After a transition period of almost 2 years, the old coins were withdrawn and the new currency became the sole means of payment on 1 January 1875.

The senate had delayed the introduction of the new currency after the founding of the empire in 1871, because they feared that the new money would result in a further loss of Hamburg's sovereignty. Kirchenpauer, who was the long-standing envoy of the city at the Federal Council, fought for the special position of Hamburg. But, in October 1872, the empire announced it would take 30 million Hamburg Marks from the Hamburg bank to ease the effect of the change and the Senate gave in.

== The two sides in Hamburg on the Accession question 1877-81 ==
The majority of Hamburg's wholesale merchants were opposed to joining the Customs Union and in favour of the maintenance of free trade. This camp included shipping companies, entrepôt traders, overseas exporters, the importers of goods into Hamburg that would have been subject to duty in the Customs Union, such as coffee and tea. These were imported in bulk, then repackaged, processed, or refined in Hamburg. The Chamber of Commerce, the stock exchange and the Senate were all decisively for free trade.

On the other hand, there were supporters of joining the Customs Union from the ranks of wholesalers of goods produced within the Customs Union, also local tradesmen, certain branches of Hamburg industry (which was anyway a small component of the economy), retail tradesmen, especially those located near the Customs Union borders. For these groups, the customs cordon made their trade with the union more difficult. Important branches of industry therefore moved from Hamburg to adjacent parts of the Customs Union area. For example, tobacco companies with a workforce of 3,000 settled in Ottensen. These pro-Customs Union protagonists on 25 May 1880 founded the Hamburger Zoll Anchluss party, which advocated the city joining the Customs Union territory but at the same time setting-up a smaller free port district. Supporters included the Ohlendorff family who owed their nobility to Prussia.

Another group of merchants spoke out for the Customs Union because they held interests in industrial companies within the Customs Union. Gustav Godeffroy, a senator, supported joining the Customs Union in 1877/78 with the publicly stated grounds that he had acquired holdings in several coal pits of Westphalia (in Prussia) and that the protection interests of this industry made him a supporter. On 31 October 31, 1880, 32 merchants wrote to the Minister President of Prussia and Imperial Chancellor Otto von Bismarck, advocating the accession of Hamburg but with the formation of a free port district.

Thus, the alternatives had shifted; it was no longer a question of free trade city or complete annexation to the Customs Union, but instead the alternatives of free trade throughout the city or in a smaller free port area.

As was to be expected, the actions of the 32 merchants unleashed a storm of indignation in Hamburg. In the stock exchange, a petition received 1,730 signatures asserting "that the preservation of the freedom of Hamburg is imperative both in the national interest of the entire fatherland and in Hamburg's interest”.

== Pressure to join the Customs Union starting in 1879 ==
In the first decade of the new federation's existence, Bismarck largely left trade policy in the hands of his deputy the liberal-minded President of the Chancellery Rudolf von Delbrück. Delbrück pursued a policy of making trade as free as possible and reduced the protective tariffs of the Customs Union. After the Franco-Prussian War, French war indemnities reduced the need for customs revenues. However, Delbrück resigned in April 1876 over disagreements with Bismarck. In 1875, the iron industry sought the retention of the 1876 expiring tariffs of the Customs Union. Bismarck now intervened - in addition to increasing individual customs duties and taxes, he would also replace the previously low financial tariffs by introducing a protective duty system. This change in customs policy would have the dual advantage of protection of domestic industry against cheap foreign imports, while increasing the revenue of the empire.

Industrial and agricultural interests were decisive. Only Hamburg, Bremen, and Oldenburg voted against Bismarck's proposals in the Federal Council. The Hamburg Chamber of Commerce justified Hamburg's opposition saying they would make the entire domestic consumption more expensive, increase costs for industry and ultimately would challenge other countries to counter-measures.

Two main causes led to the high tariff policy. Firstly, imperial expenses, particularly military, were increasing and Bismarck decided to get revenue by increasing import duties rather than by raising direct taxes. Customs duties were paid directly to the central authorities. Alternatively the contributions made by the individual states could be increased, but they would need to raise the sums by persuading their legislatures to raise direct taxation. Politically it was easier raise the tariff. Secondly, a fall in agricultural prices led the agrarian interest, which previously opposed high duties on manufactures, to combine with industrialists to demand a general increase in the tariff. The high tariff heightened the disparity with Hamburg and the Chancellor felt that Hamburg's opt-outs could no longer remain.

On May 20, 1879, the Chancellor asked the Hamburg Senate whether they would accede to the Customs Union as provided for in Article 34 of the Constitution. The Senate rejected this request citing the effect on the city's maritime trade, especially with the new high tariff policy. Then the Chancellor began to apply pressure. On 19 April 19, 1880, Prussia applied to the Federal Council for the inclusion of Altona in Prussia and St. Pauli in Hamburg in the Customs Union territory. Hamburg was not able to do anything about the inclusion of Altona, and the request for St. Pauli was felt as a deliberate snub. In a mass petition with 60,000 signatures and in well-attended meetings the Hamburgers expressed their protest against the Chancellor's actions.

On 25 February 1881, there was a further application to the Federal Council for the inclusion of the Wandsbek salient, hitherto part of the free trade zone around Hamburg. Prussia said it was appropriate to integrate Wandsbek completely into the Customs Union territory and align the customs border with the political frontier of Prussia. On 2 April 1881, the Federal Council decided to annex Wandsbek.

The Hamburg merchants feared their business would be seriously affected, while the citizens knew the cost of living would rise considerably. It was feared that the city would cease to be the great international distributing centre which it had been for so long. As a free port Hamburg could receive into its warehouses, and reship free of duty, goods imported from England and other countries at a cheaper rate than could be done with similar goods produced in Germany. Its own large population could afford to supply their wants from foreign markets free of all protective duties. The 7,000 ships that entered the port annually with the needs of themselves and their crews represented an enormous sum.

Bismarck's first attempt to coerce Hamburg achieved little – its opposition to economic union remained as firm as ever. On 9 December 1880, George Annesley, the British Consul-General, reported "it may be clearly stated that there is no question whatever of Hamburg voluntarily joining the Zollverein; such a course at present is hardly discussed".

But Bismarck was determined. He now proposed intercepting goods being transported to Hamburg along the lower Elbe, in order to levy a duty, effectively a re-introduction of the Stade tolls without the exemptions. Legally, the Elbe below Hamburg was the same as the open sea and goods could be sent to and from Hamburg without hindrance. But if such duties were levied, Hamburg's entrepôt trade would be threatened. Hamburg protested vigorously against this infringement of ancient rights that guaranteed its free access to the open sea. But the Federal Council backed Bismarck's policy.

On April 27, 1880 Versmann replaced Kirchenpauer as plenipotentiary to the Federal Council in Berlin. With prudence he raised reservations from Hamburg's point of view regarding the policy of Bismarck to annex Hamburg to the Customs Union.

== Submits to Chancellor’s policy ==
By the middle of 1880, however, it was clear to all the insiders that an absolute opposition to Bismarck's plans would be pointless. On 29 June 1880, the Chamber of Commerce wrote to the Senate stating:

“Hamburg has an opponent, who pursues his aims without recklessness, as long as he considers them to be the right one, an opponent whom we naturally cannot cope with, the opinion of which is not to be misjudged, whether it be in a political or commercial sense”.

By a majority of 16 to 5, it called on the Senate to set up a programme for future negotiations with Prussia and demand a smaller free trade district, including facilities for Hamburg's export industry.

The Senate was still largely against the Customs Union. The general public did not hear of the decision of the Chamber of Commerce, but rather the impression was expressed that the Chamber of Commerce still wanted to maintain the status of Hamburg as a free port city. With these double-tracked tactics, Senator Versmann and the Chamber of Commerce pursued the goal of strengthening the Hamburg position against Bismarck. The 1,730 name petition was used in this context. These tactics were essentially successful.

In December 1880 and January 1881, Versmann, O’Swald and Hugo Roeloffs held "informational discussions" with the Prussian Superior Customs Inspector Klostermann and the Prussian Finance Minister Karl Hermann Bitter. In April 1881 they started actual negotiations in Berlin. Versmann, O'Swald and Dr. Friedrich Krüger (Hanseatic minister (envoy) to Berlin) negotiated the definitive conclusion of the agreement.

On 25 May 1881 an agreement was signed between Prussian Finance Minister Bitter and the State Secretary of the imperial Treasury, on the one hand, Hamburg's Plenipotentiary Senators Versmann and O'Swald, and the envoy of the Hanseatic states in Berlin Dr. Krüger, on the other. It stated that Hamburg is ready to join the Customs Union with all its territory, but excluding a permanent free port district which it specified. For this district, Article 34 would still apply, thus the freedoms of that district could not be abolished or restricted without Hamburg's approval.

On 3 June 1881 the Senate voted in favour, despite the opposition of Kirchenpauer. On 15 June 1881, the resolution of the Senate was discussed in the Burgerschaft. There was a seven-hour session (7 pm - 2 am). Carl Petersen, the Commissioner for the Senate, said Hamburg would “still remain the emporium for the wide world of the German Fatherland”, to which she would be more closely united than ever. The proposal of the Senate was agreed to by 106 votes against 46. It was decided it should take effect in October 1888.

The Federal Council approved the agreement on 25 June 1881.

== Preparations for accession 1881-88 ==
In March 1882 the Senate formed a seven-member commission, including Versmann, for the preparation of the accession to the Customs Union including the construction of the free port.

On 21 February 1883 the Burgerschaft approved the plans, which included a canal to allow local navigation on the Elbe without passing through the remaining free trade zone. In order to implement the project, some 24,000 inhabitants of the affected districts had to be relocated and land worth 54.5 million marks had to be acquired. Later, when the free port was enlarged, another 25,000 inhabitants had to be resettled.

With the free port, as an emporium and for transit purposes, Hamburg would provide the same facilities as before, while merchandise intended for the interior would pay duty at the port itself, instead of at the boundaries of the city.

In 1885 the HFLG (Hamburger Freihafen-Lagerhaus Gesellschaft) was founded for the construction and impartial leasing of storage facilities in the Hamburg Free port (free trade zone). In the period remaining prior to Hamburg's accession to the Customs Union in 1888, sufficient space had to be created on the free port area for the storage and processing of the goods, which had previously been spread over the entire urban area of Hamburg. After Prussian State Railways acquired the Berlin-Hamburg Railway, the director Adolf Götting lost his position. Roeloffs recommended his appointment as operational manager of HFLG and Götting led the HFLG very successfully for over 25 years.

== Accession in October 1888 ==
On 15 October 1888, Hamburg joined the Customs Union and on 29 October the new free port area was inaugurated in the presence of Emperor Wilhelm II.

== Consequences ==
The consequences of the Customs Union were immediately felt for Hamburg consumers: the prices of many consumables rose. A pamphlet published on 15 October 1888, under the heading "Hamburger Weh" stated:

"Instead of the coffee we drink today, we'll be waving, bells, as in Saxony.
Instead of imported goods, you will smoke a cigar from the dear Palatine country.
If you also feel a little discomfort, rebelliously your stomach will also smell".

The Hamburg wholesale merchants were sceptics. However it became apparent that the founding of the free port district was of great benefit, for not only could free trade continue much as before, but the rebuilt harbour provided the most modern facilities and a great increase in capacity. This assisted economic development of the rest of the city. As this was now behind the protective external tariff of the Custom Union, industrial enterprises that were previously uncompetitive, now grew extensively.

The citizens of Hamburg were driven to make use of articles of German origin much more freely than before, as many of them were cheaper than corresponding foreign articles which were now weighted with a Customs duty. As predicted, the new conditions favoured the development of manufactures in Hamburg itself.

With the free port, Hamburg became the leading port in continental Europe and the world's fourth largest after New York, London and Liverpool. This continued the increase of trade prior to the accession, which in 1873- 1887 grew by 44.2%.

Nevertheless, outside the Customs Union, the growth of Antwerp and Rotterdam was faster than that of Hamburg in this period and both surpassed Hamburg after the First World War.

Being still outside the Customs Union, the structure of cargo handling in the free port did not change through the accession: Hamburg remained Germany's industrial port, mainly importing raw materials and foodstuffs and exporting processed products. The rapid growth of the entrepôt trade demanded a permanent expansion of the free port.

In preparation for its inclusion in the Customs Union, the state of Hamburg was obliged to carry out the following proceedings: The whole city was divided into a large number of small districts. Every citizen paying above a certain moderate rent had to make an inventory of all articles liable to Customs duties - wines, spirits, sugar, coffee, tobacco, and many other articles. On all these articles a certain limited amount of duty was levied on and after Monday 15 October 1888. All articles above 70 bottles of wine, 20 bottles of spirits, 6 lb. of tobacco, 30 lb. of coffee, and so on, were made liable to duty. Thousands of Customs officers made house-to-house visits to test the correctness of the inventories furnished. Thus consumers were prevented from hoarding products enough to last 1 or 2 months or more. Living costs were anticipated to be at least 15% higher than before.

In 1889 it was reported that rents were rising in consequence of the cost of living having risen by 25% since the incorporation of Hamburg in the Customs Union.

Effects of the incorporation of Hamburg were reported by British Consul-General. There was an increase in shipping, although it was not clear whether this could be attributed to incorporation or to other causes, but Hamburg shipping had not suffered from the change. There was a manifest benefit to retail businesses trading with the interior and also manufacturing. Also works by Prussian Railways helped to direct trade to Hamburg and other ports within the Customs Union, at the expense of those outside. The new harbour facilities, although vast, were, still insufficient to meet the demand.

900,000 inhabitants of Hamburg had now to pay the Customs Union duties, adding about 25 per cent on the cost of imports.

Also, Hamburg had to pay for 1,700 men to guard the free port customs boundary.

== Free Port ==
Free Port area in 1888

Because the main harbour had to remain outside the Customs Union, it was rebuilt, isolated from the rest of the city. The imperial authorities agreed fund 40 million marks of the construction costs, while 150 million marks was borne by Hamburg.

This Free Port consisted of the following areas. A peninsula on the north bank of the Elbe (Sandtorhafen and Grasbrookhafen), as well as the island of Kehrwieder. As the Free Port was not allowed to have residents, 1,000 property owners were expropriated and 24,000 people made homeless. On the South Bank of the Elbe 1,200 acres of marsh land were purchased and new basins constructed there. A “customs canal” was constructed separating the north bank area from the city and allowing local navigation on the Elbe to avoid passing through the customs frontier.

The free port was extended several times. Initially it had an area of 3.9 sq. miles By 1970 it had an area of 5.6 sq. miles. The free port was closed on 1 January 2013, at which time it had an area of 6.3 sq. miles, which was 23% of the port area. The later additions covered several basins and onshore installations west of the Kohlbrand.

Unlike other free ports in Germany, the Hamburg free zone had manufacturing, assembly and other processing operations, whether or not using imported materials. The Hamburg Free Port administration would give approval depending on whether the end products were primarily, although not necessarily exclusively, for re-export. Processing might be approved, even if it should lead to placement of goods in a more favourable tariff classification than at the time of entry into the zone. Customs surveillance was carried out by the Freihafenamt (Free Port Authority), rather than by the regular customs department. This authority, an arm of the state of Hamburg, which owned the land, leased the land in the free zone to private operators.

The old Free Port section included most of the city's shipyards. The zone's newer area west of the Kohlbrand included petroleum storage and extensive container terminal facilities. The Free Port had numerous warehouses, transit sheds, grain handling facilities, facilities to handle tropical fruit, raw tobacco, coffee, fish, edible oils, timber, coal and other products.

== See also ==
- Timeline of Hamburg history (extended version)
