= Friedrich Krüger =

Friedrich Krüger may refer to:

- Friedrich-Wilhelm Krüger, German war criminal and paramilitary commander
- Friedrich Krüger (diplomat), diplomat in the service of the city state of Lübeck
