= Wilhelm Merck =

German chemist and business executive

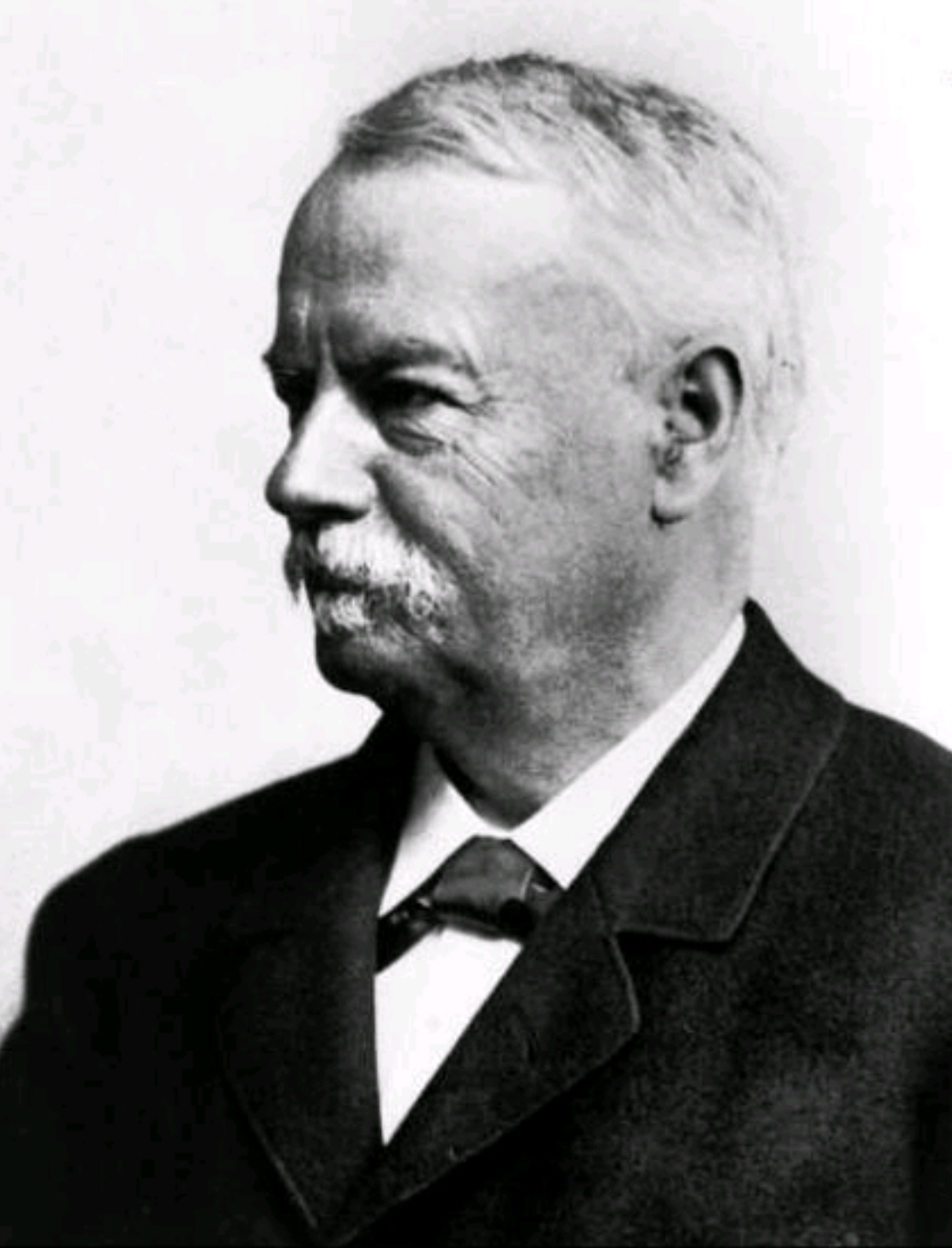
Wilhelm Merck

Christoph Wilhelm Ludwig Merck (11 October 1833 – 12 January 1899) was a German chemist and business executive, who served as senior partner and CEO of the chemical and pharmaceutical company Merck from 1885 until his death in 1899.

Wilhelm Merck was the youngest son of Emanuel Merck (1794–1855) and joined the family company in 1860; he became the company's head in 1885. He also served as president of the chamber of commerce of Darmstadt from 1882 to 1896.

Business positions
Preceded by Carl Merck	CEO of Merck; 1885–1899	Succeeded by Louis Merck
