= Johann Heinrich Bartels =

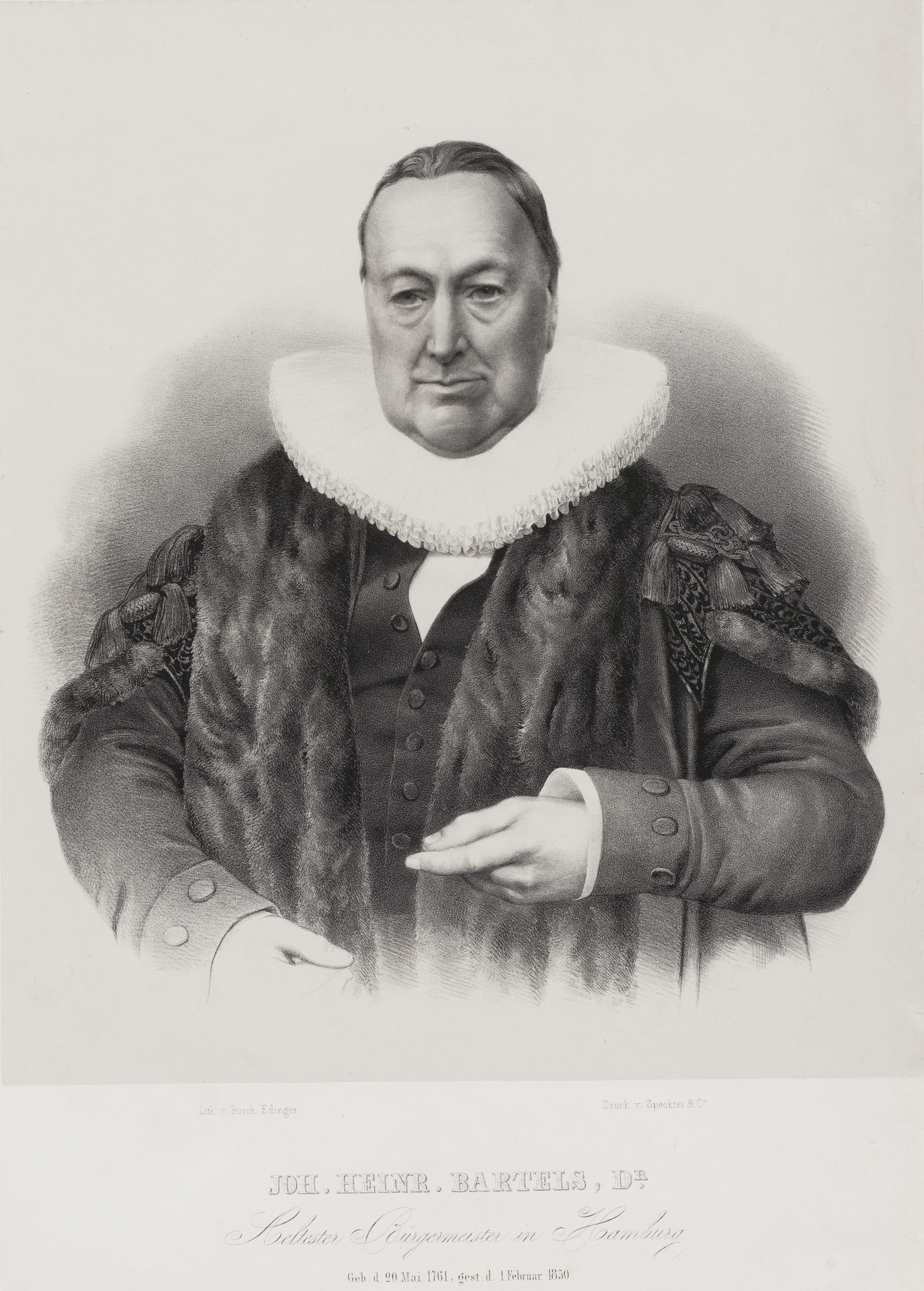
- Portrait of Johann Heinrich Bartels
- Born: 20 May 1761; Hamburg
- Died: 1 February 1850 (aged 88); Hamburg
- Occupations: Lawyer; Writer; Senator & Mayor of Hamburg
- Spouse: Maria Elisabeth von Reck (1768–1852)
- Children: 2s, 2d
- Parent(s): Claes Bartels (1728–1806); Katharina Maria Seelandt (1739–73)

Johann Heinrich Bartels (20 May 1761 – 1 February 1850) was a scholar from Hamburg who became a city senator in 1798. He played a leading role in civic administration during the difficult years of French occupation (1806-1814). In 1820 he was elected Mayor of the city, a position which he occupied for a remarkable three decades.

== Life ==
Claes Bartels (1728–1806), the father of Johann Heinrich, was a Hamburg merchant and cake baker ("Zuckerbäcker"). He was also a leading citizen of the city, being appointed an "Oberalter" in 1797. His wife, Johann Heinrich's mother, born Katharina Maria Seelandt (1739–73), was the daughter of a Protestant minister: she died in the year of Johann Heinrich's twelfth birthday.

Bartels attended the Gymnasium (Secondary school) after which he progressed to the University of Göttingen where he studied Theology in anticipation of a career as a churchman. At university he also covered a wider range of subjects, including at this stage, middle eastern languages, in which he was taught by Johann David Michaelis. By the mid 1780s, however, he had come to acknowledge that he had no inner vocation to follow the career that had been mapped out for him.

In Autumn 1785 he set out on a journey which would take him as far as the south of Italy, and from which he would return to Hamburg only at the start of 1787. Much of his "Grand Tour" is described in a volume that Bartels dedicated to his father and later published, entitled "Briefe über Kalabrien und Sizilien" ("Letters about Calabria and Sicily"). During the latter part of 1785 he traveled via Nuremberg, Regensburg, Vienna and Trieste before reaching Venice. In the course of his subsequent travels Bartels undertook studies that took in Archeology, Art history and Natural science. Through the publication of his studies included in his volume of "Letters" he became a member of various scientific academies. He traveled home via Paris and the Netherlands, and shunning the offer of a professorship covering subjects for which he had become known, returned to the University of Göttingen in order to study Law, becoming a Doctor of Jurisprudence in 1790. In 1792 he returned with his friend Amandus Augustus Abendroth to Venice where he remained for long enough to claim as his bride Maria Elisabeth, the daughter of a banker called Johann Conrad von Reck. The marriage took place on 16 September 1792. According to one source Bartels had previously met his bride and possibly become engaged to her in December 1790, during his previous stay in the city. In October 1792 his friend and traveling companion, Amandus Abendroth, married Johanna Magdalena von Reck, the sister of his own bride, just twenty days after his own marriage.

After returning to Hamburg, Bartels worked as a lawyer. In 1798 he was elected to the senate. During the years of French occupation (1806-1814) he served as President of the Chamber of the Hamburg Imperial Court. Along with this he was a member of the Municipal Council, with responsibility for welfare and penitentiaries.

With the end of the French occupation Bartels played a leading role in restoring the city's prewar constitution, devoting particular energy to the structuring of the city police department. On 25 March 1820 he was elected mayor. Bartels was a freemason, and within that organisation 1820 was also the year in which he became honorary Grand Master of the Grand Lodge of Hamburg. As a proponent of the Hamburg Constitution of 1712 he was determined to anchor the traditional order in the hearts of the citizenry. With this in mind, he published a summary of the main points of the 1712 document, using everyday language, and adding notes to provide historical and contextual clarifications. Bartels believed that the strengths of the old constitution lay most especially in the areas of civil liberties, welfare, public order, peace and security. His text from the 1712 constitution has not, to date (2016), been subjected to historical analysis, leaving readers to rely on Bartels' 1823 edition. Bartels went on to publish further articles on Hamburg's constitutional history and law. In 1848, with revolution coming back into fashion in some quarters, Bartels was firmly opposed to the demands of the liberal-nationalist movements of the day.

== Recognition ==
In 1848 the fiftieth anniversary of Bartel's election to the Hamburg Senate was celebrated with the placing in the city library of a marble bust of him. Later, the final Lightvessel to be stationed at Location Elbe 2 was named "Bürgermeister Bartels" in his honour. Bartelsstrasse ("Bartels Street") in Hamburg is also named after Johann Heinrich Bartels.

== Family ==
The marriage of Johann Heinrich Bartels and Maria Elisabeth von Reck which took place in 1792 resulted in the recorded births of two daughters and two sons. Their daughter Beata Cecilia Bartels (1799–1869) married Edward Banks (1795-1851), a Hamburg Syndicus. Through this marriage Bartels became the grandfather of the politician Edward Banks.
