= Hugo Roeloffs =

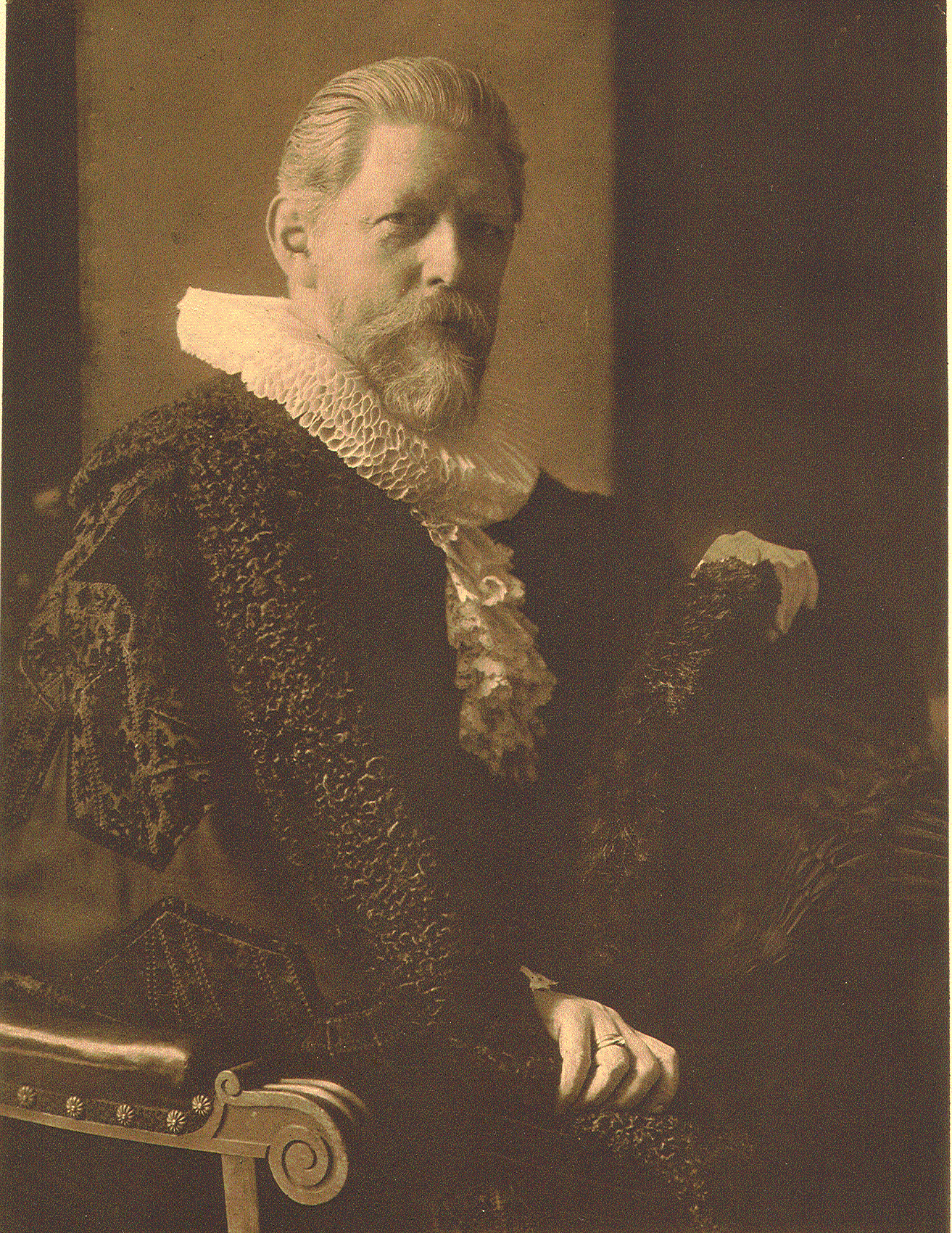
- Born: 2 May 1844; Hamburg
- Died: 25 May 1928 (aged 84); Hamburg
- Occupations: Civil servant & Syndicus
- Political party: Nonpartisan

Hugo Amandus Roeloffs (1844 –1928), was a Syndicus of the Senate of Hamburg.

== Early life ==
Roeloffs was born on 2 May 1844 in Hamburg, then an independent free city and member of the German Confederation. He grew up in Hamburg and had to leave school at the age of 13 to contribute to the family's livelihood. During the economic crisis of 1857 he became a clerk in the law firm Dres. Albrecht & G. Hertz.

From 1861, Roeoffs was a court recorder at the Hamburg Commercial Court under Johannes Versmann, who had been elected to the Hamburg Senate the same year. In 1864, when Versmann was President of the Deputation for Indirect Taxes and Duties, he offered to Roeloffs the post of interim customs guard and excise-guard, which Roeloffs accepted. Roeloffs quickly became the expert on tax issues in the Hamburg State Administration and belonged to the Deputation until his retirement in 1913.

== Customs issues ==
In the constitutional negotiations of the North German Federation, Roeloffs was appointed as an advisor to Senator Gustav Heinrich Kirchenpauer for the issue of exclusions from the German Customs Union. Roeloffs was considered to be economically educated, since he was in the years 1864 to 1868 listener to the public lectures of Adolf Soetbeer and Ludwig Aegidi in Hamburg.

From 1870, Roeloffs became one of Versmann's closest associates. He accompanied Versmann in all negotiations regarding customs issues. In 1880, he was appointed First Secretary of the Deputation for Indirect Taxes.

== Accession of Hamburg to the Customs Union ==
In May 1879, the Imperial Chancellor asked the Hamburg Senate to accede to the German Customs Union as provided for in Article 34 of the Constitution. The Senate rejected this, citing the effect on the city's maritime trade, especially with the new high external tariff of the Customs Union. In the autumn of 1880, Roeloffs, with senators Versmann and O'Swald, and Arthur Lutteroth, made a fact-finding journey to Antwerp, Rotterdam, Amsterdam, London, and Liverpool, in order to clarify the basis on which Hamburg could negotiate terms with Prussia. In December, 1880, and at the beginning of the year 1881, Roeloffs, Versmann and O'Swald, had "informational discussions" with the Prussian Superior Customs Inspector Klostermann and the Prussian Finance Minister Karl Hermann Bitter. Versmann negotiated the political issues, while Roeloffs dealt with the technical issues.

On 25 March 1881, Versmann proposed to the Senate of Hamburg and the Imperial Government that real negotiations should begin. In April he conducted these negotiations in Berlin with Roeloffs and Senator O'Swald. Eventually an agreement was reached and this was ratified by the Federal Council (Bundesrat) on 25 June 1881. The result of the negotiations, which largely fulfilled the Hamburg wishes, was in large part the results of Roeloff's work. The agreement was that Hamburg would join the Customs Union with all its territory, except for a free port district which it specified. For this district, Article 34 would still apply, thus the freedoms of that district could not be abolished without Hamburg's approval.

In 1885 the HFLG (Hamburger Freihafen-Lagerhaus Gesellschaft) was founded for the construction and impartial leasing of storage facilities in the Hamburg Free port (free trade zone). In the period remaining prior to Hamburg's accession to the Customs Union in 1888, sufficient space had to be created on the free port area for the storage and processing of the goods, which had previously been spread over the entire urban area of Hamburg. After Prussian State Railways acquired the Berlin-Hamburg Railway, the director Adolf Götting lost his position. Roeloffs recommended his appointment as operational manager of HFLG and Götting led the HFLG very successfully for over 25 years.

== Syndicus ==
Because of his outstanding achievements, he was appointed Senate Secretary in 1882. After the successful accession to the Customs Union and the establishment of the Free Port with the rebuilt central harbour area, both in 1888, Roeloffs was appointed Senate Syndicus (who was a non-voting participant in the Senate) the next year in 1889.

Roeloffs was Syndicus from 1889 to 1912. He acquired in various administrative functions a comprehensive knowledge of all customs and trade issues and had a lasting influence on the way Hamburg acceded to the Customs Union. There were several proposals to elect Roeloffs as senator. But this would have been possible only as a commercial senator, since he had no degree; he would have had a considerable loss of salary, so he never became a senator.

In 1900 his wife had a rose variety named after her: Frau Syndica Roeloffs. (Bred by Peter Lambert)

He died on 25 May 1928, in Hamburg.
