= Ritzebüttel Castle =

14th-century castle in Lower Saxony, Germany

Coordinates: 53°51′26″N 8°41′54″E

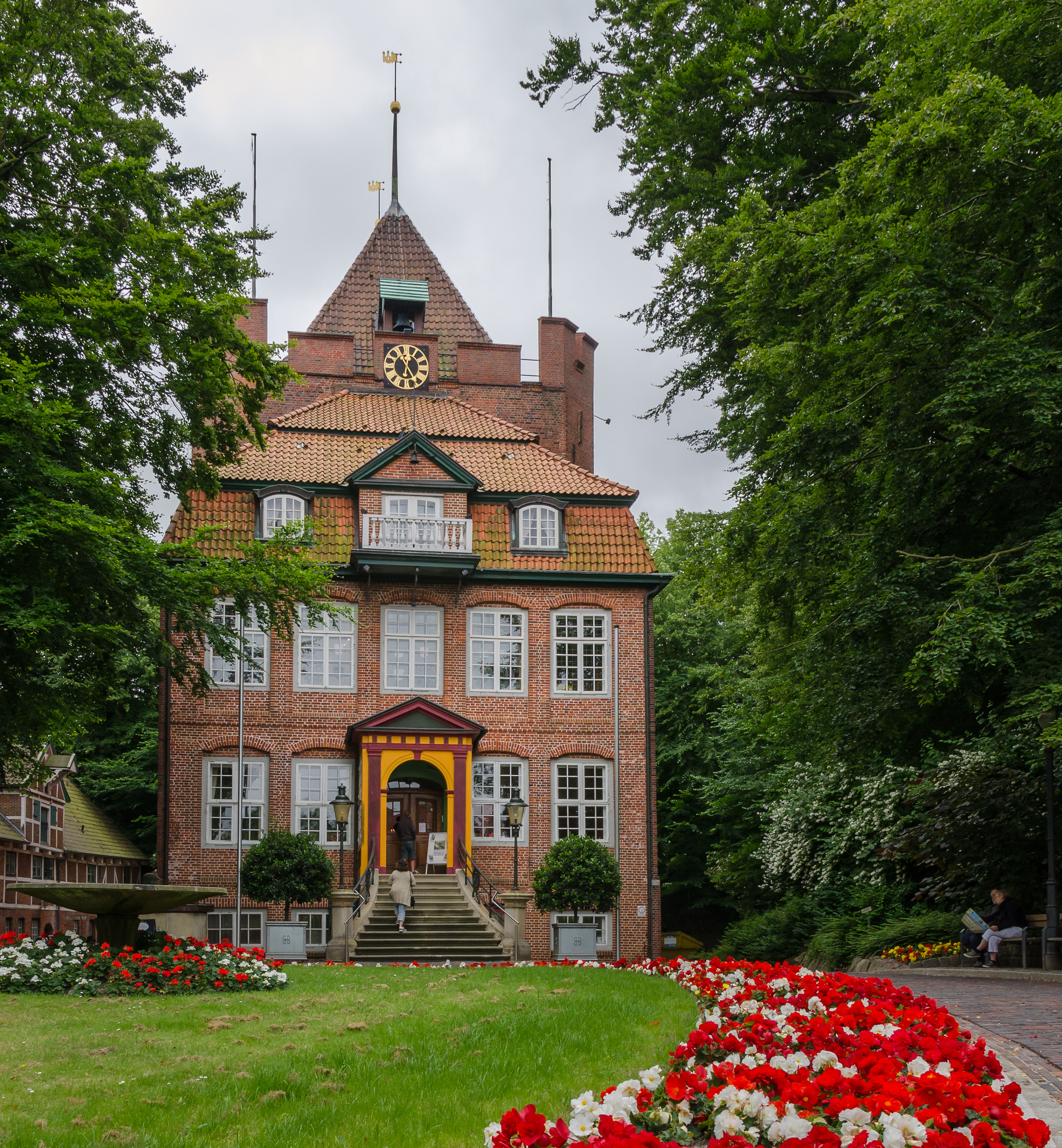
View of the baroque front of the manor

Ritzebüttel Castle in Cuxhaven was the residence of the Hamburg bailiffs, back when Ritzebüttel still belonged to the city of Hamburg. The castle, part of which dates back to the 14th century, is one of the oldest preserved secular buildings of the North German Brick Gothic style in the region and is now open to visitors.

== History ==
The castle is based on a residential tower built around 1340 for the feudal lords of Saxe-Lauenburg. It was built just 30 years after the outwardly very similar tower on the island of Neuwerk in Hamburg. After disputes with the city of Hamburg and a subsequent siege by the Hanseatic city in 1393, the castle passed from the Lappes into the possession of Hamburg on July 31, 1394. As it was easy to control the Lower Elbe from Ritzebüttel and the fortress also included large pieces of land, the place was a valuable possession for Hamburg. The city also had access to a winter emergency port and could react more quickly against the pirates of the North Sea from here.

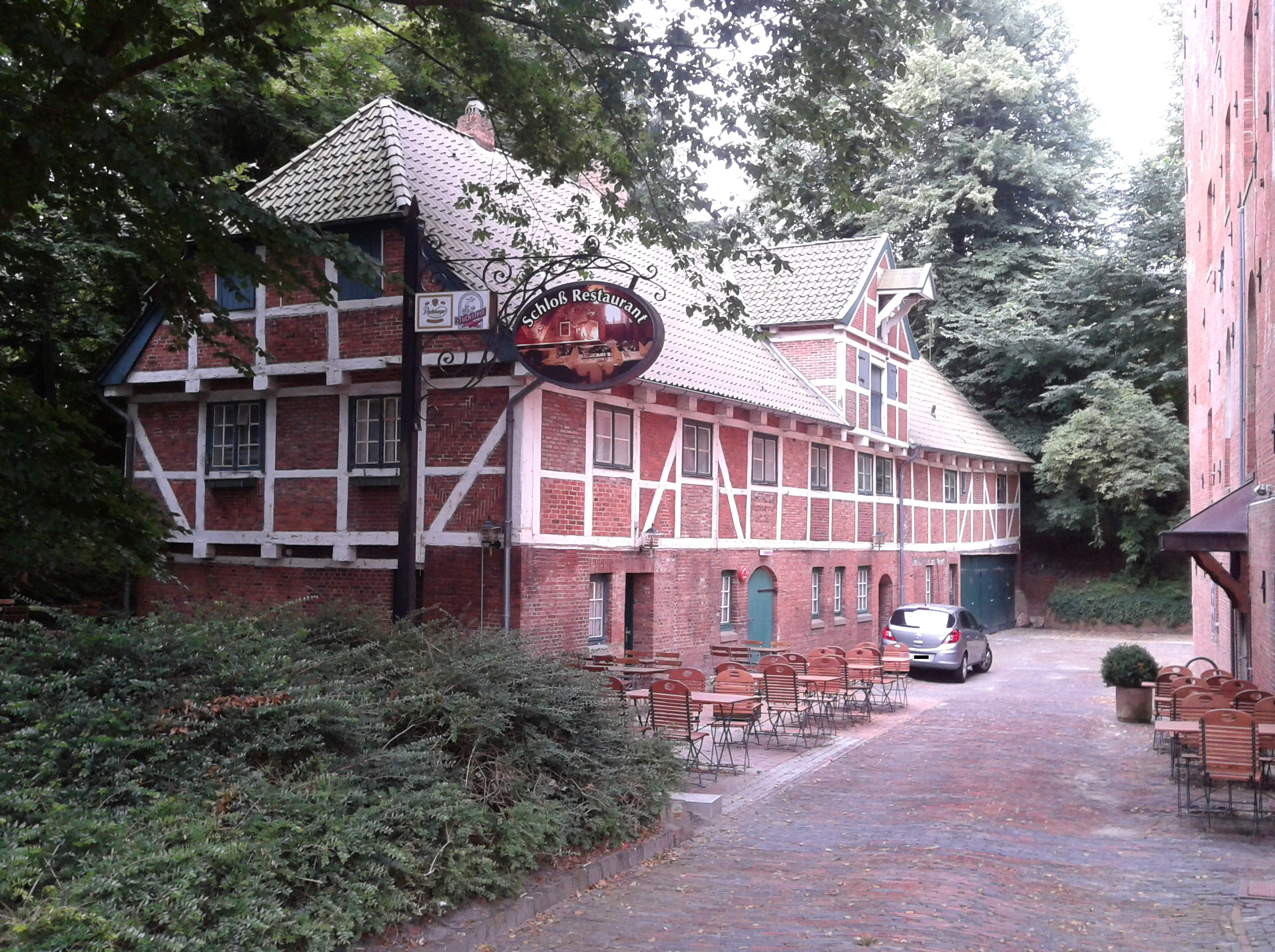
Castle Ritzebüttel Restaurant

The bailiffs were mostly senators of Hamburg including, among others, the writer and poet Barthold Heinrich Brockes as well as the advocate Amandus Augustus Abendroth. The bailiffs lived for over 500 years in the complex, which was rebuilt from a castle with mostly defensive use to a manor with representative purpose. They had a comprehensive list of privileges as can be seen from the extensive equipment of the manor. Despite that, the actual office in Ritzebüttel was not favoured, as it meant living in the countryside a three days trip away from the luxurious commodities of Hamburg to carry out their official duties. The jurisdiction and administration of this office got separated in 1864, leading to the Hamburger bailiffs losing a lot of influence. With the exchange of Cuxhaven in 1937 due to the Greater Hamburg Act with Altona, Hamburg, Harburg-Wilhelmsburg and Wandsbek to Prussia, all political meaning of the castle was lost. The building was used for different purposes until 1981. Due to its bad condition it was in dire need of renovation. The renovation got delayed several times due to lack of funding but were ultimately finished in 1996. With a new concept of usage the castle was given to the community and includes a restaurant, exhibition rooms and a wedding room. Every room can be visited, and there are different kinds of markets on the castlegrounds.

== Architecture ==
=== Castle ===
The late medieval castle originally had a mighty defensive and residential tower with a rectangular layout, surrounded by ramparts and moats, and was therefore the type of a tower castle. This tower still forms the core of the complex, entirely constructed of red brick. During the control of Hamburg, the fortifications were reinforced: the walls were thickened to three meters, and the tower was raised to a height of 21 meters, with the roof structure adding an additional nine meters. The tower, crowned with large crenellations, has remained largely unchanged in appearance since its construction.

In the 17th century, a half timbered extension was added to the front of the tower. With its three small turrets and a grand entrance gate, it referenced the Hamburg city coat of arms. This portal building was dismantled in the 18th century and replaced by the preserved five-axis baroque style front extension seen today. Over the centuries, the castles defensive structures were mostly dismantled and now survive only as fragments in the castle garden.

The castle features architectural elements and details spanning nearly 600 years of art history. Inside the defensive tower, the original gothic brick arches from the initial construction phase can still be found. Additionally, the ceremonial halls on the second and third floors remain intact, as well as the living quarters of the administrative officials, which include antique furnishings from around 1900. The grounds are nowadays listed in the monument atlas of Lower Saxony.

=== Swiss House in castle park ===
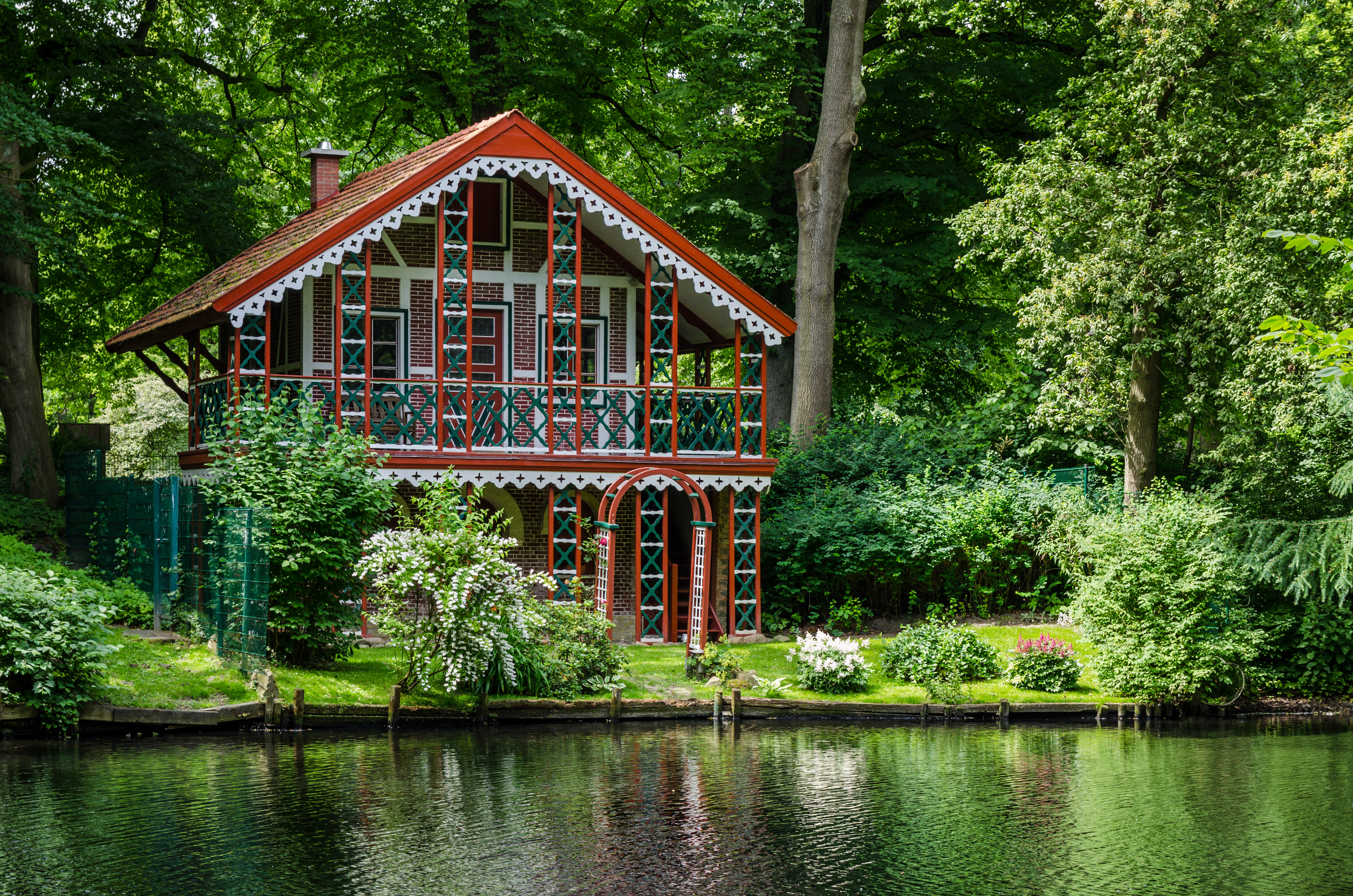
The Swiss House

In 1847, the Swiss House, built in the Swiss chalet style, was constructed as a tea house in the garden of Ritzebüttel Castle at the request of the then-administrator, Sthamer. The architectural style of the Swiss House can also be found in some tea and garden pavilions in other parks of that time. The house is located in the middle of the park path, which encircles the castle and its surrounding moat. Its significance was further emphasized by the later construction of an open-air stage directly adjacent to the house, as both facilities were occasionally used together.

=== War Memorial ===
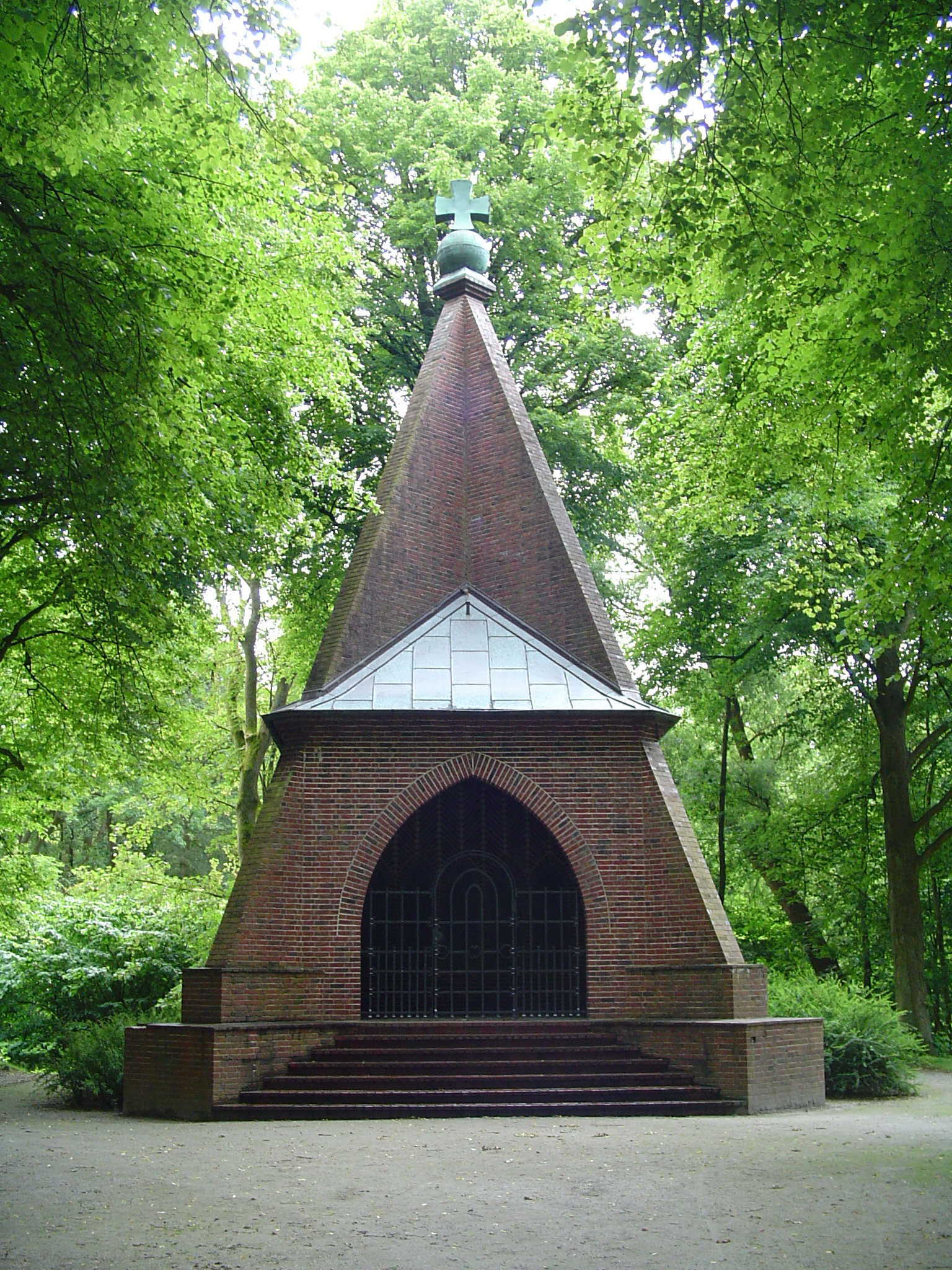
The War Memorial

On February 21, 1932, the former mayor Grube inaugurated a war memorial in the park of Ritzebüttel Castle. It was designed by the then-city architect Carl Jung and commemorates those who fell during the First World War. The memorial is located on the grounds of the Krähenhof, which burned down in 1909 and was added to the castle garden area in 1913. Architecturally, it resembles the Kugelbake (a maritime navigational structure). The last structural modifications were made in 1980, when the original sandstone honor plaques inside the memorial were replaced with metal ones, and an iron grille was installed.

== Literature ==
- Ernst Andreas Friedrich: Das Schloß Ritzebüttel. In: Wenn Steine reden könnten. Band IV, Landbuch-Verlag, Hannover 1998, ISBN 3-7842-0558-5, S. 157–159.
- Hermann Borrmann: Daten zur Geschichte des Amtes Ritzebüttel und der Stadt Cuxhaven. Verlagsgesellschaft Cuxhaven, Cuxhaven 1982.
- Andreas Wendowski: Schloß Ritzebüttel in Cuxhaven: Ergebnisse der Ausgrabungen 1984–1986. In: Berichte zur Denkmalpflege in Niedersachsen. Band 6, 1986, S. 106–109.
- Rolf Bärenfänger/Andreas Wendowski: Die spätmittelalterliche Sanitäranlage am Schloß Ritzebüttel in Cuxhaven. In: Berichte zur Denkmalpflege in Niedersachsen. Band 8, 1988, S. 50 f., 58.
- Schloß Ritzebüttel. Beiträge zur Geschichte des Amtshauses, hrsg. v. Verein „Bürger für das Schloss Ritzebüttel e. V.“ in Zusammenarbeit mit der Stadt Cuxhaven. Ottendorf 1994.
- Willi Nitschke: Schloß Ritzebüttel in Cuxhaven: Ergebnisse der Bauuntersuchungen 1992. In: Niedersächsische Denkmalpflege. Band 15, 1991/92, S. 191–208
