= Karl Hermann Bitter =

German writer (1813–1885)

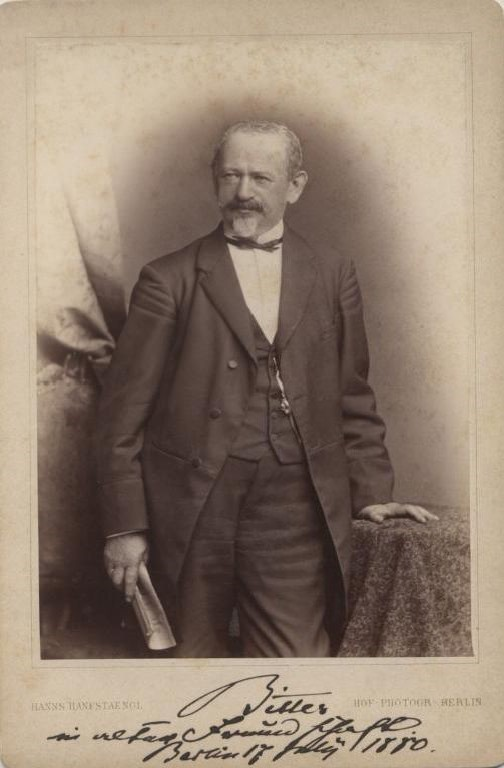

Karl Hermann Bitter (27 February 1813 – 12 September 1885) was a Prussian statesman and writer on music.

== Biography ==
Bitter was born at Schwedt, Province of Brandenburg, and studied law and cameralistics at Berlin and Bonn. He served as the plenipotentiary of Prussia on the Danube Commission from 1856 to 1860, was prefect of the Department of Vosges during the Franco-Prussian War.

Bitter later became minister of finance (1879), an office in which he displayed exceptional ability. He increased the indirect duties derived from the so-called tobacco monopoly and the tax on spirits and malt, and introduced the “Börsensteuer” (tax on the bourse). Bitter also concluded the commercial treaty with the city of Hamburg by which that city entered the German Customs Union. On 25 May 1881 this agreement was signed between Bitter and the State Secretary of the imperial Treasury, on the one hand, Hamburg's Plenipotentiary Senators Versmann and O'Swald, and the envoy of the Hanseatic states in Berlin Dr. Friedrich Krüger, on the other. It stated that Hamburg was ready to accede to the Customs Union with all its territory, but excluding a permanent free port district which it specified. For this district, Article 34 of the imperial constitution would still apply, thus the freedoms of that district could not be abolished or restricted without Hamburg's approval.

Bitter reestablished the stability of the Prussian finances, and took a prominent part in bringing the railroads of Germany under government control. He resigned in 1882, in consequence of differences with Bismarck.

Bitter's literary activity was confined almost exclusively to works on music. His Gesammelte Schriften (Collected Writings) appeared in 1884.
