= Louis Merck =

German chemist and business executive (1854–1913)

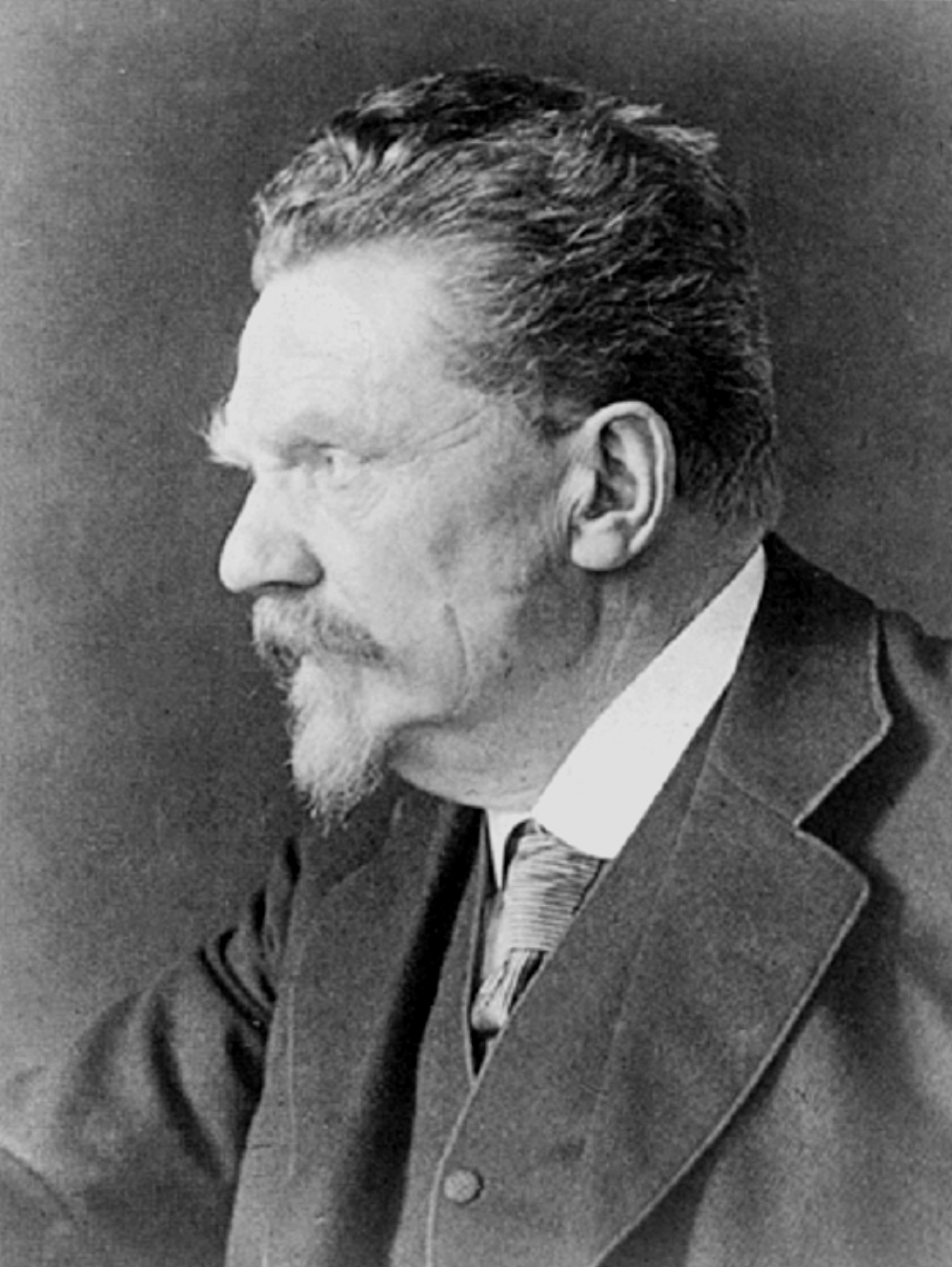
Louis Merck

Louis Merck (born 8 November 1854 in Darmstadt, died 15 September 1913 in Darmstadt) was a German chemist and business executive, who was CEO of Merck from 1897 to 1913.

A member of the Merck family, he joined the family company in 1883 as head of research, and became chairman and CEO in 1897. During his tenure, the company held a virtual monopoly on santonin and cocaine.

In 1905, he was appointed by Ernest Louis, Grand Duke of Hesse as a member for life of the upper house of the parliament of the Grand Duchy of Hesse. He was also conferred an honorary doctorate at the University of Giessen in 1907. He also received the honorary title Geheimer Kommerzienrat (i.e. "Privy Councillor of Commerce").

== Literature ==
- Jochen Lengemann (1996), Hessische Abgeordnete 1808–1996 (p. 259), Marburg, ISBN 3-7708-1071-6
- S. Poth: Carl Remigius Fresenius (1818-1897). Wissenschaftliche Verlagsgesellschaft, 2007, ISBN 3-804-72326-8 p. 99.
- "Nachruf," in Zeitschrift für angewandte Chemie und Zentralblatt für technische Chemie 1913, p. 648.

Business positions
Preceded by Wilhelm Merck	CEO of Merck; 1897–1913	Succeeded by Emanuel August Merck
