= Friedrich Krüger (diplomat) =

German diplomat and lawyer

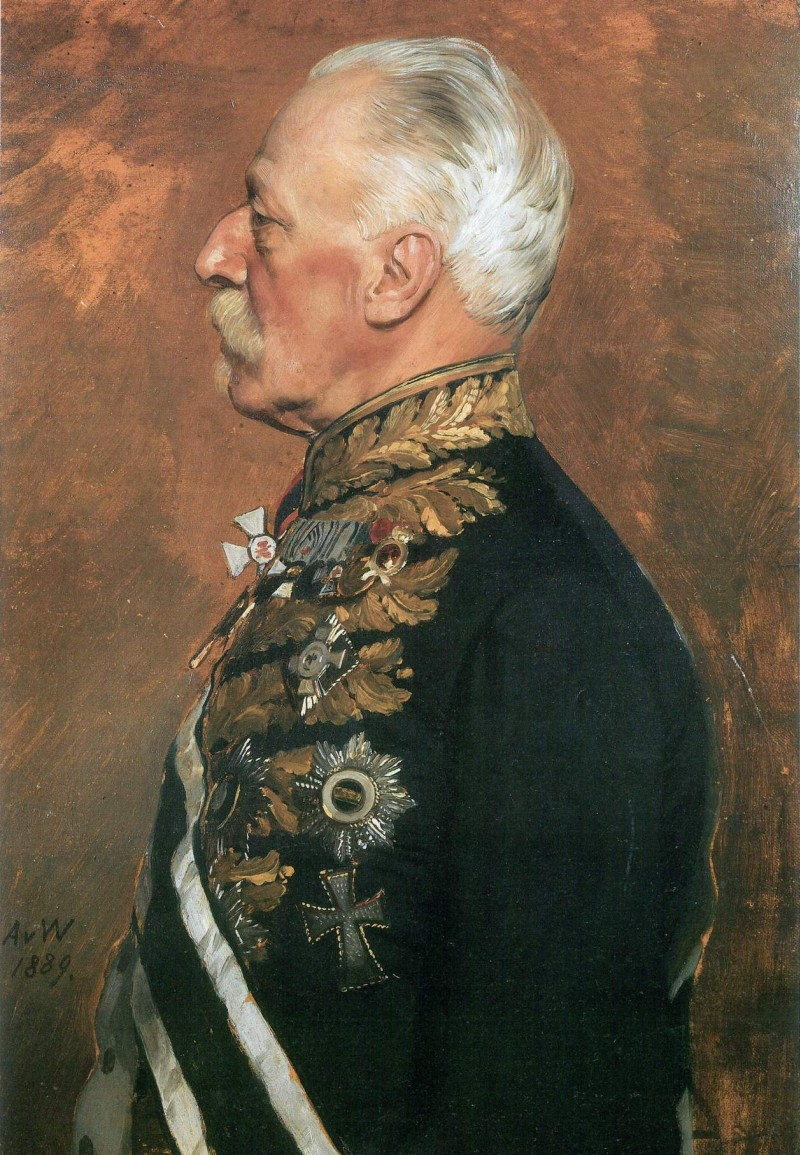
- Born: 22 September 1819; Lübeck
- Died: 17 January 1896 (aged 76); Berlin, Germany
- Resting place: Burgtorfriedhof
- Occupations: Lawyer; Diplomat
- Political party: Nonpartisan
- Spouse: Elisabeth Donnenberg (1831–1889)

Daniel Christian Friedrich Krüger was a diplomat in the service of the city state of Lübeck and also jointly of the Hanseatic cities of Lübeck, Hamburg and Bremen. He was born in Lübeck on 22 September 1819 and died in Berlin on 17 January 1896.

== Early life ==
Krüger was the son of a Lübeck Senator. After attending the Lübeck Gymnasium, he studied jurisprudence at the universities of Bonn, Berlin, and Göttingen and completed his professional training by a long stay abroad, particularly Paris.

In 1844, Krüger became a lawyer in Lübeck and was appointed procurator in the lower court and the court of appeals. Krüger's efficiency was fully acknowledged and in 1850 the city sent him as its representative to the Erfurt Union and the following year to the Elbe Ship Navigation commission in Magdeburg. After the introduction of the new constitution of Lübeck in 1849, he became the Spokesman of the Bürgerausschuss, the Committee of the House of Burgesses.

== Diplomatic service ==
In 1855 he became the Minister-Resident of the Hanseatic states at Copenhagen and conducted negotiations which resulted in the abolition of the Sound Dues, which had been a tax on Lübeck’s trade out from the Baltic to the open sea. By the Copenhagen Convention in 1857 this source of revenue for Denmark was bought out by Great Britain, Russia, Lübeck and the other states trading in the Baltic.

The railway connections between the three Hanseatic city states were of special interest to him. At his instigation, Denmark agreed to a direct railway line across its territory in Holstein from Lübeck to Hamburg. Already in Copenhagen, he had successfully represented Hamburg's interest in the construction of a railway connecting this town to Altona (in Holstein) and concluded an agreement with the Danish government in 1860.

== Hanseatic representative to the German Confederation ==
The Second Schleswig War of 1864 brought an end to Krüger's activity in Copenhagen. He then took over the representation of the free cities in the Bundestag of the German Confederation at Frankfurt. On 14 June 1866 he addressed its last session, before the outbreak the Austro-Prussian War which ended that institution.

At that time Schleswig and Holstein were a Prusso-Austrian condominium, with Prussia occupying the former and Austria the latter. On 8 June 1866 Prussian general Von Manteuffel crossed the river Eider into Holstein, having warned the Austrians that he was exercising Prussia’s condominate right to establish garrisons in some unoccupied points of Holstein. Austria withdrew from Holstein, but invited the Bundestag to mobilise militarily against Prussia.

All three Hanseatic cities, through their envoy Krüger, voted against the Austrian proposal in the Bundestag on 14 June and jointly put a declaration formulated by Lübeck reasoning that the events in Holstein did not give rise to the mobilisation of the Confederation because the danger of an immediate collision was eliminated.

However the proposal was carried. The Lübeck Senate sided with the Prussian view that the Confederation should no longer exist, because of the illegal action of mobilisation and proposed that their Bundestag envoy Krüger be recalled. Carl Merck, foreign minister of Hamburg, wanted to wait and went to see the Lübeck Senate on 19 June to persuade them of this course.

On 21 June, the representatives of the Hanseatic cities met in Hamburg to discuss in detail measures which had been demanded by Prussia. The Prussian ambassador to the Hanseatic states, Emil von Richthofen, who also took part in this conference, emphasised that the abolition of all relations with Prussia's opponents was indispensable as a sign of friendly neutrality, and that therefore their Bundestag envoy in Frankfurt, Krüger, must be recalled. The meeting agreed to recall Krüger on 29 June.

Richthofen now tried to persuade the Senate of Hamburg to give in to other demands, namely to send a military contingent to assist Prussia and to agree to a new close federation under Prussian hegemony. On 24 June, he visited two prominent members of the House of Burgesses (Burgerschaft), Isaac Wolffson (former President of the Burgerschaft and member of the Right party) and Johannes Halben (leader of the Left party), to inform them of the intended rejection of the Prussian proposals by the Senate. He pointed out that Prussia would not accept a refusal without further action. He mentioned that Prussia would dissolve the Senate and take over the government. The Burgerschaft would remain undisturbed, as would the population, if they kept quiet. Otherwise, 10,000 Prussian troops would occupy the city. Merck, to whom Wolffson and Halben had already reported this, sent Krüger, who had been in Hamburg since 22 June, to Richthofen to obtain certainty about the Prussian threats. At the 26 June meeting of the Hamburg Senate, Merck said that to avoid occupation of Hamburg, dissolution of the government or further coercion, it was now necessary to give way. All of northern Germany had joined Prussia, and one could not be sure what energetic steps Prussia could take. Krüger, still their Bundestag envoy, was not without influence on the decisions during the critical hours, and then had to return to Frankfurt to make a joint statement of the three cities. His attitude had been cautious since 16 June. Thus a milder answer to Prussia than originally proposed on 22 June was then sent.

== Hanseatic Minister-Resident in Berlin ==
In October 1866 he was appointed Minister-Resident of the Hanseatic cities in Berlin, in succession to Friedrich Heinrich Geffcken. When the new North German Federation came into being as a result of the Austro-Prussian war, among Kruger's most important tasks was the incorporation of the free cities he represented in the new federal and imperial structures. He advised on the take-over of the military establishments, the transition of the post and telegraph system to imperial control, and especially in the organisation of new customs relations. His own city Lübeck merged into the Customs Union shortly after joining the North German Federation, along with Lübeck’s neighbours the two Mecklenburg states, while twenty years later he dealt with the Customs Union accession of Bremen and Hamburg.

Shortly after his move to Berlin, he was able to inform Hamburg that the Prussian Ministry of Commerce could assist in promoting the construction of the Venlo-Hamburg railway, which Hamburg had agreed with Hanover before its annexation to Prussia. For Bremen, Krüger negotiated the territorial exchanges necessary to enable the expansion of Bremen's harbour districts.

== Federal Council (Bundesrat) ==
In addition to his role as Hanseatic envoy in Berlin, he was appointed Lübeck’s plenipotentiary to the new Federal Council in 1868, alongside Gustav Kirchenpauer who represented Hamburg. In the Federal Council, Kruger contributed to the Judicial Committee, maritime affairs, trade and transport, railway, post and telegraphs, Alsace-Lorraine and the construction of the Reichstag building.

== German Customs Union ==
He concluded the commercial treaty with the city of Hamburg by which that city entered the German Customs Union. On 25 May 1881 this agreement was signed between the Prussian Finance Minister Karl Bitter and the State Secretary of the imperial Treasury, on the one hand, Hamburg's Plenipotentiary Senators Johannes Versmann and William Henry O'Swald, and Krüger, on the other. It stated that Hamburg was ready to accede to the Customs Union with all its territory, but excluding a permanent free port district which it specified. For this district, Article 34 of the imperial constitution would still apply, thus the freedoms of that district could not be abolished or restricted without Hamburg's approval.

In 1884 Bremen likewise applied to accede to the German Customs Union and he concluded negotiations in 1885. Bremen also secured a free port area, to be built below the old town. Also bonded warehouses for petroleum were to be set-up in the out-ports of Bremerhaven and Geestemunde.

Krüger died in post in Berlin on 17 January 1896, of a stomach bleeding. He was succeeded in April as Hanseatic Minister in Berlin by Karl Klügmann, also from Lübeck, who was appointed by the Senates of the three city states.
