= Edward Banks (politician) =

Edward Bartels Banks (1 January 1836 – 22 May 1883) was a lawyer who became a politician and a member of the newly established Reichstag (German parliament) in 1871. His great grandfather, William Banks, was an English merchant who had relocated to Hamburg.

== Life ==
Banks came from a political family. His father, Edward Banks (1795–1851), was a Hamburg Syndicus while his maternal grandfather, Johann Heinrich Bartels (1761–1851) had been a mayor of the city. A brother in law was the writer-historian Otto Beneke (1812–1891).

He attended school in Hamburg and Lübeck, before moving on to study Law at Tübingen and Göttingen. While at Tübingen he became a member of the Germania student fraternity. After an eighteen-month world tour, in 1860 he settled back in Hamburg to work as a lawyer. In 1865 Salomon Abendana Belmonte joined the firm.

In 1866 Banks was elected to the Hamburg Parliament where he sat as a member of the left-wing group. In 1870 he served in the militia in the war against France, and following unification stood successfully for election to the new German Reichstag as a Progressive Party candidate, representing a Hamburg electoral district. In the 1874 election he lost his seat to the National Liberal Hermann Joachim Eduard Schmidt but was still able to gain a seat in the 1874 assembly, representing a Berlin constituency following a bye-election. He lost his seat in 1877, however.

In May 1883 Edward Banks killed himself.
