= Karl Sieveking =

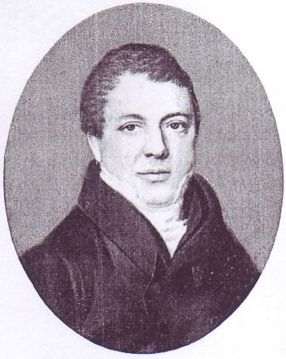
Karl Sieveking, 1827

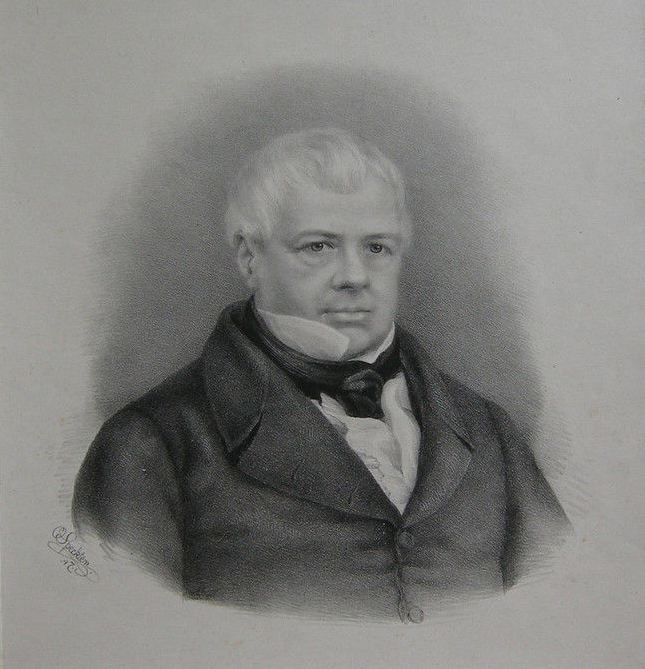
Karl Sieveking by Otto Speckter, 1847

Karl Sieveking (1 November 1787 – 30 June 1847) was a Syndicus of Hamburg, diplomat, politician, patron of the arts and philanthropist. The four syndics sat in the Senate with the senators and took part in the debates, but had no vote. The office, at that time, was somewhat analogous to that of a cabinet minister (which did not exist as such in Hamburg). To them were entrusted all important negotiations, and the preparation of every legislative enactment. A syndicus ranked between a mayor and a senator and had the title "Magnificence". Sieveking was one of the most influential figures in Hamburg in the first half of the 19th century. Among the many traces he left behind in his hometown include the Rauhes Haus, the Kunstverein and the former country estate Hammer Park.

== Origins ==
The Sieveking family was originally from Westphalia and was a merchant family based in Hamburg since the middle of the 18th century. The son of the merchant Georg Heinrich Sieveking, he was originally intended to become a merchant as well. His mother, Johanna Margaretha Sieveking, was the daughter of the physician, natural historian and economist Johann Albert Heinrich Reimarus.

== Early life ==
His mother promoted early the artistic interests of her son and sent him, after the death of his father, to the Katharineum in Lübeck, the Academic School of the Johanneum and the Academic Gymnasium in Hamburg. At the graduation ceremony, August Neander (with whom he remained friends all his life) and he gave speeches in Latin.

He then studied law and political science at Göttingen, and Heidelberg universities from 1806 to 1810. After a brief period as secretary to his uncle Charles-Frédéric Reinhard, who was French Minister Plenipotentiary in the Kingdom of Westphalia, Sieveking first went back to Göttingen, obtaining a post-doctoral qualification. But during the climax of the Napoleonic Wars, he participated in setting-up the Burgher Militia of Hamburg and moved there in 1815.

In 1819, Sieveking was appointed as the envoy of the Hanseatic cities (Hamburg, Lübeck and Bremen) in St. Petersburg.

== Syndicus ==
Then in 1820 he was elected as a syndicus of the Hamburg Senate. In this office, too, Sieveking worked primarily in the field of foreign relations. For example, he participated in the drafting of the Elbe Shipping Agreement (21 June 1821) which provided for duty-free trade on the Elbe. In 1827 he negotiated a trade agreement in Rio de Janeiro with the newly independent Brazil and opened the lucrative South American market to Hamburg merchants.

After 1830, he represented Hamburg at the Diet of the German Confederation in Frankfurt am Main.

In 1841, the New Zealand Company proposed to establish a German colony in the Chatham Islands, which lie 500 miles east of New Zealand. John Ward for the company signed an agreement with Sieveking on 12 September 1841. However, when the Colonial Office said any Germans settling there would be treated as aliens, the proposed leader of the venture, John Beit, took the expedition to Nelson, New Zealand instead. Their ship was named Sankt Pauli.

Sieveking continued as Syndicus until his death and was succeeded by Carl Merck, who was elected in his place the next month in July 1847. However, one of the existing Syndics, Edward Banks, was now entrusted with the direction of foreign affairs.

== Other work ==
In addition to his diplomatic and political duties, Sieveking worked as a promoter of numerous artists of his time and also the Hamburg Artists Association (1832). In addition, he made it possible to found the Rauhe Haus for neglected children by giving Johann Hinrich Wichern a piece of land from his private property.

== See also ==
- German colonial projects before 1871
