= Amandus Augustus Abendroth =

German jurist and mayor of Hamburg

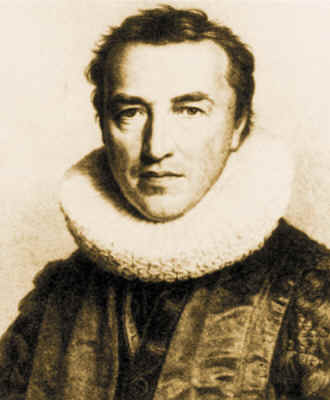
- Abendroth on a painting.
- Born: 16 October 1767
- Died: 17 December 1842 (aged 75)
- Education: Doctor of Law; University of Erlangen–Nuremberg
- Parents: Abraham Augustus Abendroth (father); Johanna Maria Abendroth (née Groot) (mother)
- Relatives: Anna Maria von Borstel

Amandus Augustus Abendroth (16 October 1767 in Hamburg – 17 December 1842) was a German jurist and mayor of Hamburg.

He was the son of Abraham Augustus Abendroth, a lower court procuration from Eisenberg, Saxony. Beginning in 1787, he studied law in Erlangen and Göttingen, where he was awarded a doctorate on 30 March 1790. He married in Venice in 1792. After having lived for a number of years as a lawyer in Hamburg, where he helped to administer the newly founded Armen-Anstalt (Poor's Institution), he was elected alderman on 5 September 1800.

In this capacity he held the office of praetor – meaning mayor – during the French occupation. The praetor was the first instance for civil cases and led the fact-finding actions when required. In 1809 he became governor of Ritzebüttel. After the incorporation of the town into the French Empire, he became maire, mayor of the same town.

After the end of the occupation and his return to Hamburg, Abendroth became head of the police, as successor of his brother-in-law Johann Heinrich Bartels, and once more helped in the Armen-Anstalt. He was voted mayor of Hamburg on 29 July 1831, succeeding Wilhelm Amsinck.

He is the father of August Abendroth, a Hamburgian lawyer.

== Sources ==
- Allgemeine Deutsche Biographie - online version
