= Friedrich Heinrich Geffcken =

German diplomat and jurist (1830–1896)

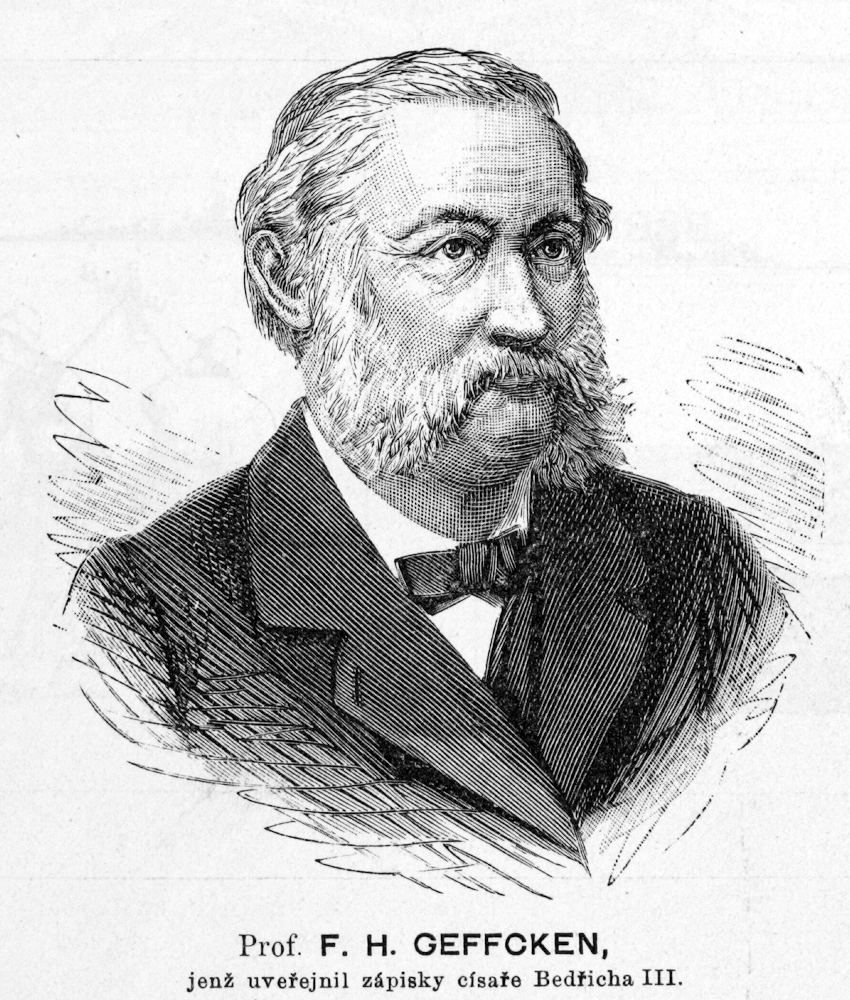
- Friedrich Heinrich Geffcken, 1888
- Born: 9 December 1830
- Died: 1 May 1896 (aged 65)

Friedrich Heinrich Geffcken (9 December 1830 – 1 May 1896) was a German diplomat and jurist, born in Hamburg, of which city his father was senator.

== Biography ==
After studying law at Bonn, Göttingen and Berlin, he was attached to the Hanseatic legation at Paris in 1854. In 1856 he was appointed Hamburg's Chargé d'affaires to Prussia in Berlin, and then raised in 1859 to Minister-Resident in Berlin of the Hanseatic states (i.e. Bremen and Lübeck as well). In 1866 he was succeeded in that post by Friedrich Krüger, a native of Lübeck, and moved to London to become the Hanseatic Minister-Resident there, replacing Rudolf Schleiden. However, with the coming of the North German Federation, Hamburg lost control over its foreign affairs outside of Germany and his post in London was abolished in 1869.

Geffcken returned home and was appointed a Syndic of the Senate of Hamburg, a position analogous to a government minister. The senior Syndic was Carl Merck who had charge of foreign affairs, while Kirchenpauer was Hamburg's representative at the new Federal Council in Berlin. Geffcken's activities covered education and poor relief, and he also spoke on commercial, coin and tax matters. Wishing to turn more to literary endeavours, he resigned as Syndic spring 1872.

Appointed in 1872 professor of constitutional history and public law in the reorganized University of Strassburg, Geffcken became in 1880 a member of the council of state of Alsace-Lorraine. Of too nervous a temperament to withstand the strain of the responsibilities of his position, he retired from public service in 1882, and lived henceforth mostly at Munich, where he died, suffocated by an accidental escape of gas into his bedchamber, in 1896.

Geffcken was a man of great erudition and wide knowledge and of remarkable legal acumen, and from these qualities proceeded the personal influence he possessed. He was moreover a dear writer and made his mark as an essayist. He was one of the most trusted advisers of the Prussian crown prince, Frederick William (afterwards the emperor Frederick), and it was he (it is said, at Bismarck's suggestion) who drew up the draft of the New German federal constitution, which was submitted to the crown prince's headquarters at Versailles during the Franco-Prussian War. It was also Geffcken who assisted in framing the famous document which the emperor Frederick, on his accession to the throne in 1888, addressed to the chancellor. This memorandum gave umbrage, and on the publication by Geffcken in the Deutsche Rundschau (Oct. 1888) of extracts from the emperor Frederick's private diary during the Franco-Prussian war, he was, at Bismarck's insistence, prosecuted for high treason. The Reichsgericht (supreme court), however, quashed the indictment, and Geffcken was liberated after being under arrest for three months.

Publications of various kinds proceeded from his pen. Among these are Zur Geschichte des orientalischen Krieges 1853–1856 (Berlin, 1881); Frankreich, Russland und der Dreibund (Berlin, 1894); and Staat und Kirche (1875), English translation by E. F. Fairfax (1877). His writings on English history have been translated by S. J. Macmullan and published as The British Empire, with essays on Prince Albert of Saxe-Coburg and Gotha, Palmerston, Beaconsfield, Gladstone, and reform of the House of Lords (1889).

== Honors ==
- Officer of the Brazilian Order of the Rose (1863).
- Knight of the second class with badge of the Order of the Crown (Prussia) (1863).
- Knight of the Legion of Honour (1863).
