= Edward Banks (Syndicus) =

Syndicus of the Free City of Hamburg

- Born: 28 February 1796; Hamburg
- Died: 17 December 1851 (aged 55); Veytaux, Vaud, Switzerland
- Occupations: Lawyer; Diplomat; Politician & Syndicus
- Political party: Nonpartisan
- Spouse: Caecilia Beata Bartels
- Children: Edward Banks (1836-1883); Marietta Beneke
- Parent(s): Wilhelm Banks; Catharina Elisabeth Hasche

Edward Banks (1796 - 1851) was one of the leading figures of the Free City of Hamburg in the mid 19th century, holding the office of Syndicus from 1837 until his death in 1851. His family was of English origin, having emigrated around 1660.

== Early life ==
After service in the Hanseatic militia at the end of the Napoleonic Wars, he studied law and political science at the universities of Göttingen, Berlin and Jena and received a doctorate in September 1819. He became an advocate in Hamburg and joined the Hamburg civil service as a legal official in Ritzebüttel, an exclave of the state of Hamburg at the mouth of the Elbe. In 1826 he became Senate Secretary.

== Syndicus ==
In 1837, in recognition of his eminent talent and business experience, he was elected to the post of Syndicus. The four syndics sat in the Senate with the senators and took part in the debates, but had no vote. They had the title "Magnificence" and ranked between the mayors and the senators. The office, at that time, was somewhat analogous to that of a cabinet minister (which did not exist as such in Hamburg). To them were entrusted all important negotiations, and the preparation of every legislative enactment.

In this office, he first dealt with trade policy, the postal service and railways. After the great fire of 1842, he brought about the construction of new buildings and the establishment of exemplary drainage and water supply facilities.

Following the death of Karl Sieveking in 1847, Carl Merck was elected to Sieveking's Syndicus post, joining the other Syndics - Banks, Wilhelm Amsinck and Johann Kauffmann. Sieveking had been in charge of the Foreign Affairs of the State of Hamburg since 1820 when he became a Syndicus. After Sieveking's death, Banks was entrusted with the direction of foreign affairs. From 1848, Banks took up a number of diplomatic posts and was Hamburg's representative at the Diet of the German Confederation in Frankfurt am Main.

== National Assembly in Frankfurt ==
As a result of the German revolution starting in March 1848, Banks was sent by the Diet to London as a special envoy of the Federal Diet and soon afterwards became “Reichsgesandter” (German ambassador) in London for the fledgling central administration in Frankfurt. In the same capacity he went to Copenhagen in late autumn, after which he continued as the state of Hamburg’s representative at Frankfurt.

== Death ==
As a result of the exhausting activity of these turbulent years, Banks had to seek a milder climate in the autumn of 1851 to restore his health, but died on 17 December at Veytaux near Vevey on the eastern shore of Lake Geneva.
