= Carl Merck =

German statesman

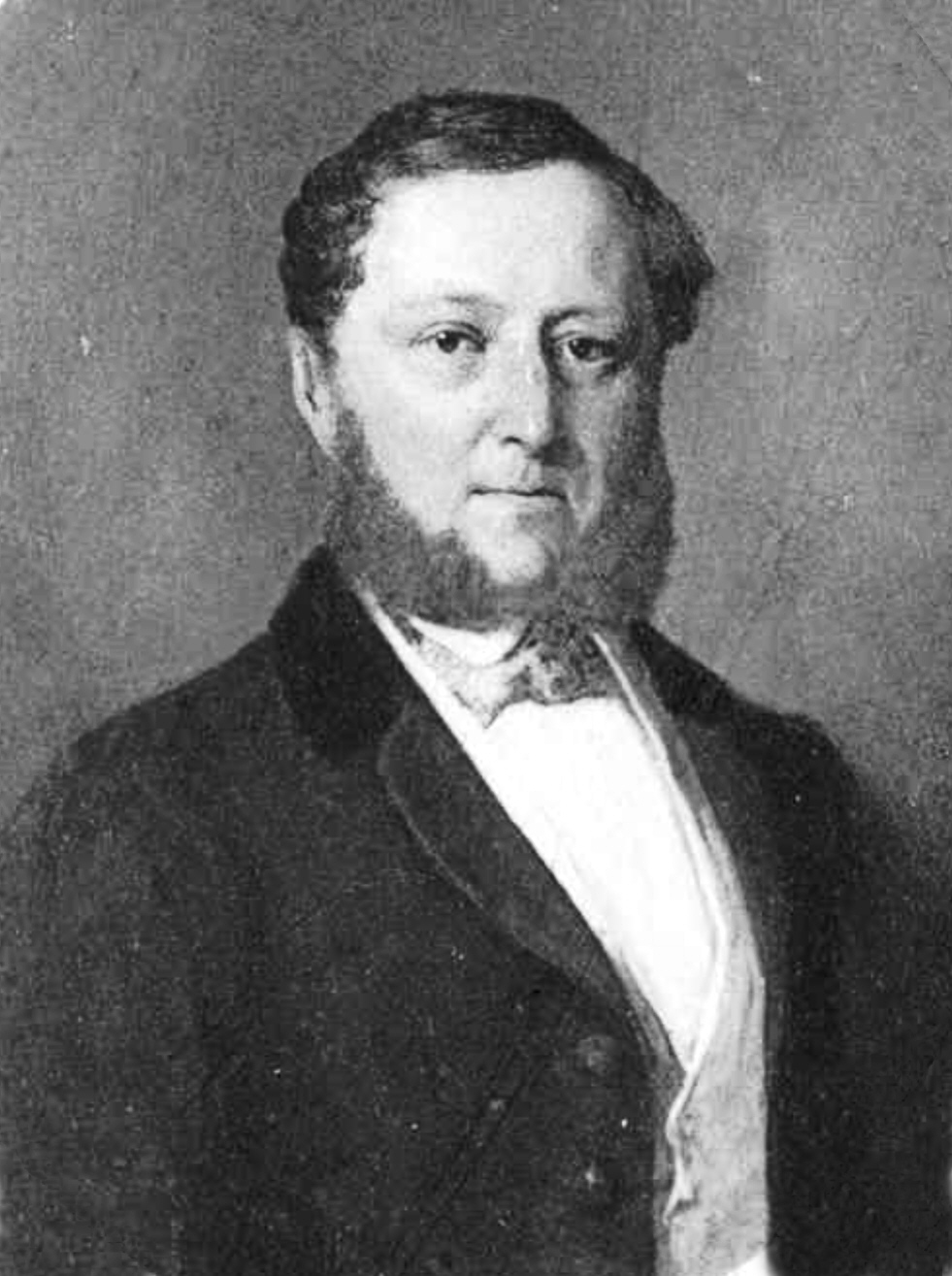

Carl Hermann Merck (3 May 1809 – 16 October 1880) was one of the leading Hamburg statesmen of the 19th century, holding the office of Syndicus from 1847 until his death in 1880.

== Early life ==
His father Heinrich Johann Merck (1770-1853), originally from Schweinfurt, Franconia, was a Hamburg merchant and became a Senator in 1820. Carl Merck attended school at the Johanneum in Hamburg and the Gymnasium in Rinteln. He then studied law and political science in Leipzig, Göttingen, and Heidelberg universities, being awarded a doctorate at Heidelberg in 1831. Rather than pursue a career in Law, he travelled widely, nominally on behalf of his father's firm, to further his education. For several years he lived successively in England, France, Switzerland, Italy, Greece, Turkey, and Egypt.

In 1840 Merck returned to Hamburg to devote himself more and more to the public affairs of his native city. First, he took part in the establishment of the Hamburg-Bergedorf railway, the first railway line which was undertaken in north Germany. After the Great fire of Hamburg of May 1842, he joined as a Secretary in the then formed Technical Commission for reconstruction, which included British engineer William Lindley.

== Syndicus ==
In 1843 the position of Senate Secretary became free, which, as a rule, opened the prospect of becoming a Syndicus, because a Syndicus would normally have progressed from Secretary. Both Merck and his friend from Heidelberg University, Gustav Heinrich Kirchenpauer, were interested and they submitted their applications at precisely the same time. The competition resolved itself, as the Senate elected Kirchenpauer to be a senator on 4 December and then gave the free secretary office to Merck on 22 December. From this Merck rose, as he had hoped, in July 1847 to become one of the four Syndics. He was elected Syndicus replacing Karl Sieveking, joining Syndics Wilhelm Amsinck, Johann Kauffmann and Edward Banks.

The four syndics sat in the Senate with the senators and took part in the debates, but had no vote. The office, at that time, was somewhat analogous to that of a cabinet minister (which did not exist as such in Hamburg). To them were entrusted all important negotiations, and the preparation of every legislative enactment.

Sieveking had been in charge of the Foreign Affairs of the State of Hamburg since 1820 when he became a Syndicus. After Sieveking's death, Banks was entrusted with the direction of foreign affairs. From 1848, Banks took up a number of diplomatic posts abroad and later suffered from ill health. Merck then took on the foreign affairs role. Since then, Merck was at the centre of public life in Hamburg.

Hermann Merck was a representative of Hanseatic particularism par excellence. Merck, who himself came from a wealthy merchant family, sought to guarantee the welfare of the city and its trade and promote the continuity of Hamburg's policy of neutrality and the preservation of its independence. He belonged to the anti-Prussian party in the Senate of Hamburg, because Prussia for him embodied the “power state” and he did not think the creation of something good and durable was likely, if the policy was based on power, rather than law.

Although the law of 1849 gave the Syndics only a consultative function, they were ranked between the senators and the two mayors. However, the Constitution of Hamburg of 1860 narrowed their rights, so that they now ranked behind the senators and they also lost their title "Magnificence". Merck's special position in the Senate can be measured by the fact that an exception was made in his case and he retained the title, rank and responsibilities.

== Merck and 1866 crisis ==
Following the Second Schleswig War of 1864, Schleswig and Holstein became a Prusso-Austrian condominium, with Prussia occupying the former and Austria the latter. On 8 June 1866 Prussian general Von Manteuffel crossed the river Eider into Holstein, having warned the Austrians that he was exercising Prussia's condominate right to establish garrisons in some unoccupied points of Holstein. Austria withdrew from Holstein, but requested the Federal Diet (Bundestag) of the German Confederation to mobilise militarily against Prussia.

On 11 June, the Diet was convoked and Austria moved that all Federal military contingents except Prussia's be mobilised. Prussia responded by laying before the Diet a scheme of reform of ten articles, the most salient being the exclusion of Austria from the Confederation and the election of a representative body in the remainder; Prussia moved its immediate adoption. The Diet voted on the Austrian proposal on 14 June, which was carried by nine votes to six. The three Hanseatic cities, through their joint envoy Friedrich Krüger, voted against the Austrian proposal and made a declaration (formulated by Lübeck) that the events in Holstein did not justify the mobilisation of Federal forces because the danger of an immediate collision had passed.

On 16 June, Emil von Richthofen, the Prussian envoy to the Hanseatic states, presented to the Hamburg Senate and other German governments an "identical note" asking for an alliance on the basis of Prussia's reform proposal placed before the Diet and requesting that its troops be mobilised and placed at the disposal Prussia.

Under the direction of Merck, the Senate Foreign Affairs Commission (Hamburg's foreign ministry), dealt with the Prussian proposals on 17 June. The result was negative, because the Commission believed that the Prussian alliance was not in Hamburg's interests. Instead, they proposed to hold a conference with the other two Hanseatic cities in order to proceed together on this question. Prior to this conference, Merck endeavoured to determine the specific consequences of a rejection of the Prussian alliance for Hamburg. Merck learned more about Prussian intentions through diplomatic channels with the Hanseatic Minister-Resident in Berlin, Friedrich Geffcken, reporting that the Prussian Minister Alexander von Schleinitz said the King had stated that Prussia did not want to act against the Hanseatic cities, as they voted with Prussia in the Federal Diet on 14 June.

The Lübeck Senate supported the Prussian view that the Confederation should no longer exist, because of the illegal action of mobilisation and proposed that their Federal Diet envoy Krüger be recalled. But Merck wanted to wait and went to see the Lübeck Senate on 19 June to persuade them of this course.

On 21 June, representatives of the Hanseatic cities met in Hamburg to discuss the measures demanded by Prussia. Richthofen took part in this conference and emphasised that ending relations with Prussia's opponents was indispensable as a sign of friendly neutrality, and that therefore their Federal Diet envoy in Frankfurt, Krüger, must be recalled. The meeting agreed to recall Krüger on 29 June. Richthofen now tried to persuade the Senate of Hamburg to give in to other demands, to send a military contingent to help Prussia and to agree to a new federation. The Hamburg Senate met on 22 June and approved the recall of Krüger, but, apparently encouraged by reassuring reports from Geffcken, decided to reject the Prussian alliance offer. The only concession was the promise to do nothing hostile to Prussia and to promote federal reform in the future. To soften the impression of rejection, Merck visited Richthofen on 23 June to inform him in advance of the result of the Senate meeting.

On 24 June, Richthofen met two prominent members of the House of Burgesses (Burgerschaft), Isaac Wolffson (former President of that chamber and member of the Right party) and Johannes Halben (leader of the Left party), to inform them of the intended rejection of the Prussian proposals by the Senate. He pointed out that Prussia would not accept a refusal without further action. He mentioned that Prussia would dissolve the Senate and take over the government. The Burgerschaft would remain undisturbed, as would the population, if they kept quiet. Otherwise, 10,000 Prussian troops would occupy the city. Merck, to whom Wolffson and Halben reported this, sent Krüger, who had been in Hamburg since 22 June, to Richthofen to obtain certainty about the Prussian threats.

The Senate resumed meeting on 25 June. Already some senators had moved away from rejection of the alliance. In a detailed presentation, Merck described to the Senate the changed situation since their resolution of 22 June. He regarded the positive attitude of Lübeck to the Prussian alliance and the threats of Richthofen as particularly serious. He was particularly afraid that, after the accession of all other north German states to the alliance, Hamburg would stand completely isolated. Hamburg's independence was thus seriously threatened. In these circumstances, Merck continued, the Senate must examine whether, in a matter concerning continued political existence, the Senate could hold to its legally based position.

Then at the 26 June Senate meeting, Merck said that to avoid occupation of Hamburg, dissolution of the government or further coercion, it was now necessary to give way. All of northern Germany had joined Prussia, and one could not be sure what energetic steps Prussia could take. Krüger, still their Federal Diet envoy, was not without influence on the decisions during the critical hours – he then returned to Frankfurt to make a joint statement on behalf of the Hanseatic cities. His attitude had been cautious since 16 June. A milder answer to Prussia than originally proposed on 22 June was then sent.

Merck also wrote to the Hamburg Resident in London, in order to create understanding in Britain for the forced connection to Prussia and thereby to preserve the benefit of Hamburg's good relations with Britain. Then, exhausted, a nervous breakdown compelled him to hand over the business to Senator Kirchenpauer.

Merck, who had now recovered, tried again to convince the Burgerschaft of the inevitability of the decision. The day after the Austrian defeat at the Battle of Königgrätz, on 4 July, the Senate submitted to the Burgerschaft the following urgent requests: (i) Assent to the alliance with Prussia, subject to further negotiations on the details. (ii) Support the continuation of the Brigade with Oldenburg, Bremen and Lübeck. (iii) Authorise the costs of mobilisation. The House assented by 113 votes to 54. Thus enabled, Merck informed Richthofen on 5 July that Hamburg constitutionally approved her accession to the Prussian alliance, accepting the guarantees given by Prussia and mobilising the Hamburg troops to be at the disposal of Prussia. In August, two battalions of Hamburg troops, joined by a battalion from Lubeck and two Prussian battalions, were sent to Frankfurt to replace Prussian troops in that area. These were needed for the occupation of Darmstadt, Heidelberg, and Mannheim.

On 18 August, Geffcken signed in Berlin a one-year duration treaty between Hamburg and Prussia, concluding an alliance to preserve the independence and integrity of their states. For this purpose all troops were placed under Prussian supreme command. They would hold elections to an imperial parliament and their plenipotentiaries would meet in Berlin to draft a constitution for the new federation. With the conclusion of this treaty, the dramatic struggle for the accession of the last north German state to the Prussian alliance was over.

== Other duties ==
Merck, in addition to the Syndicate for Foreign Affairs, was given many other official functions, both in public and private, such as President of the Kunsthalle and the Hamburg City Hall Construction Commission, also chairman of the International Horticultural Exhibition of 1869.

== Postscript ==
He was spared seeing the occurrence Hamburg's absorption in the German Customs Union, the so-called “Zoll Anchluss”, as he died in October 1880 a few months before the conclusion of the treaty in 1881.
