= William Henry O'Swald =

German merchant and senator

William O'Swald
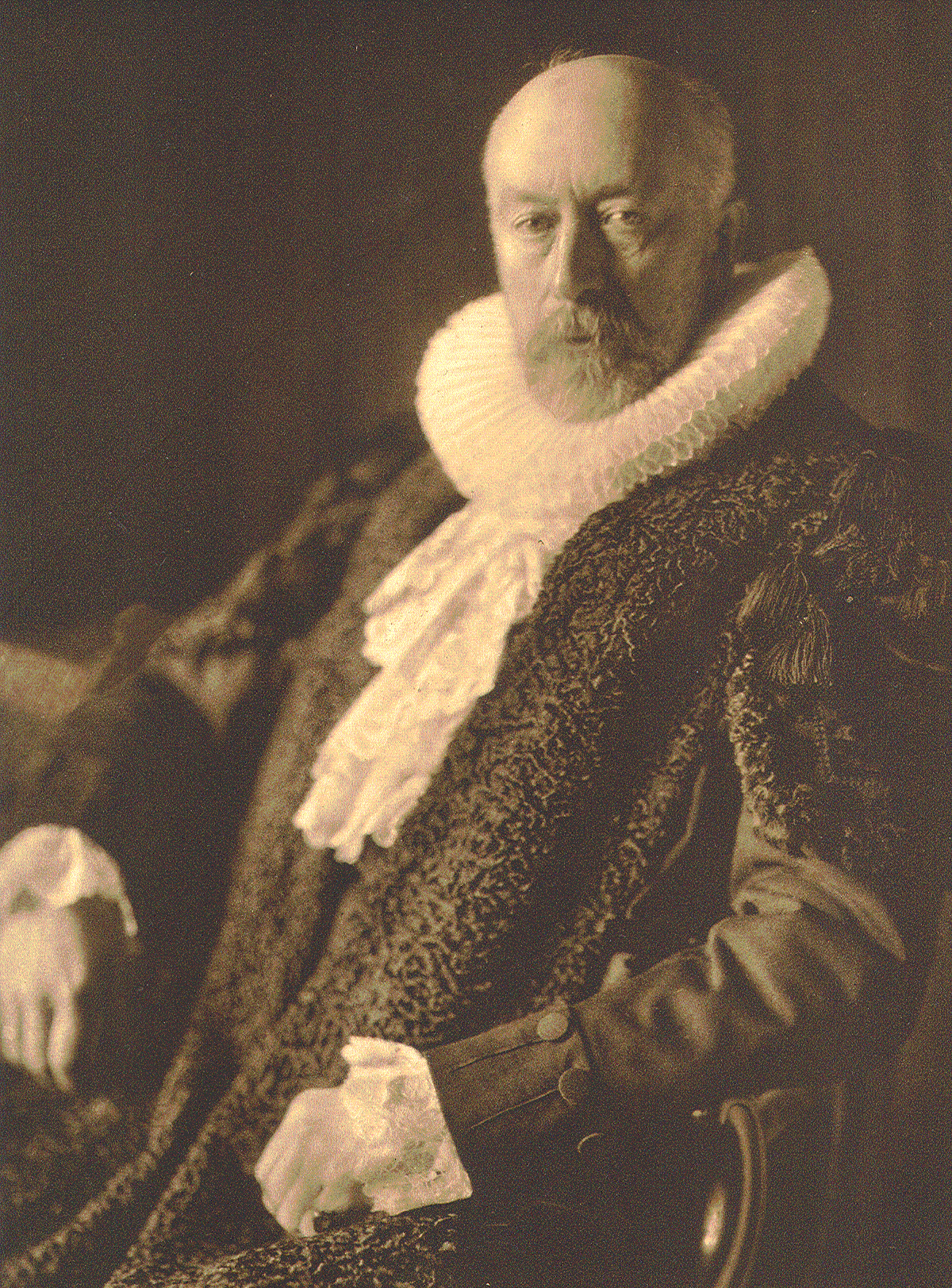
- William O'Swald in Hamburg senator's ornate, 1905; by Rudolf Dührkoop

Second Mayor of Hamburg
- In office 3 April 1908 – 31 December 1909
- Preceded by: Johann Heinrich Burchard
- Succeeded by: Carl August Schröder

Personal details
- Born: 23 August 1832 Blankenese
- Died: 7 May 1923 (Age 90) Hamburg
- Party: Nonpartisan

William Henry O'Swald (23 August 1832, Blankenese, Duchy of Holstein – 7 May 1923, Hamburg) was a Hamburg overseas merchant and Senator.

== Biography ==
William Henry O'Swald's father was Johan Carl Heinrich Wilhelm O'Swald (1798–1859) a Prussian who in 1831 founded the company O'Swald & Co in Hamburg. In 1847 the company began trade with Zanzibar, Lagos and Palma. The main office was in Zanzibar. Particularly successful was the Kaurischneckenhandel, trade of cowries, then used as shell money. Scarce in West Africa, cowries were purchased cheaply in the Seychelles where they were common and sold at great profit to African middlemen involved in the slave trade (Zanzibar was the main slave port in East Africa. The cowry money was also currency in the to and fro trade of commodities and products, especially linen between Zanzibar and Hamburg.

In 1849 the Company established further business links in Lagos, important for the Palm oil trade and in 1853 O'Swald & Co. bought the Hamburg merchant Diederichsen's Lagos factory. Five years later in 1858 the elder brother Percy O'Swald Albrecht (1831–1899) was made a partner of O'Swald & Co and in 1859 he was followed by William O'Swald. In the following years, the brothers changed the management of the company each year, one living in Zanzibar, the other in Hamburg. In 1859 William O'Swald negotiated with Majid ibn Sa'id, the Sultan of Zanzibar, a commercial contract for the Hanseatic cities of Hamburg, Lübeck and Bremen, which had great influence in interior eastern Africa. The Sultan benefited personally and Zanzibar benefited from the resulting increased tax revenues. In the following years using his position as Honorary Consul in Zanzibar he established new branches of the company in Madagascar, the Somali Coast and the German Protectorate in East Africa. O'Swald was also "praeses" (head) of the deputation for trade and shipping (a mixed commission of experts and officials) in the administration of Hamburg.

In 1866 he was elected member of the Hamburg Parliament. Three years later (11 January 1869) the parliament elected him lifelong senator of Hamburg. He remained member of the Senate of Hamburg until 1 July 1912. On 3 April 1908 his fellow senators elected him deputy mayor (Second Mayor of Hamburg) for the term until 31 December 1909. He promoted Hamburgs colonial trade and established in 1886 the Hamburg section of the "Deutsche Kolonial-Gesellschaft" (German Colonial Society) and was elected as a member of the board of that organisation in Berlin. He had however no enthusiasm in colonial political affairs and often criticised the politics of German East Africa Company of Karl Peters as did his friend, the Hamburg shipping magnate Johann Cesar VI. Godeffroy.

== See also ==
- German colonial empire
