= List of mountains and hills of Hesse =

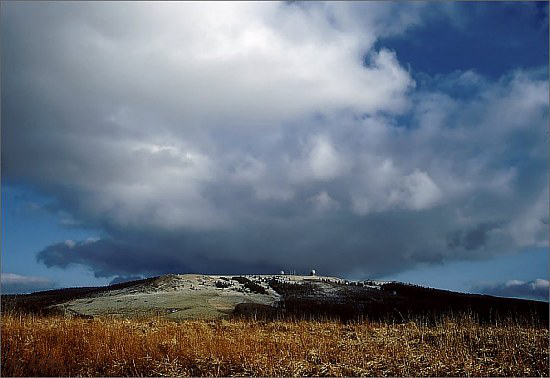
The Wasserkuppe, the highest mountain in Hesse

This list of mountains and hills of Hesse contains a selection of the significant mountain and hills located in the German federal state of Hesse sorted in each case by their height in metres above sea level (Normalhöhennull or NHN).

== Highest mountains in Hesse’s provinces ==
The following table shows the highest mountain in each of the three Hessian provinces or Regierungsbezirke.

Highest mountains of the most important ranges in Hesse
Heights given in metres (m) above Normalhöhennull (NHN)

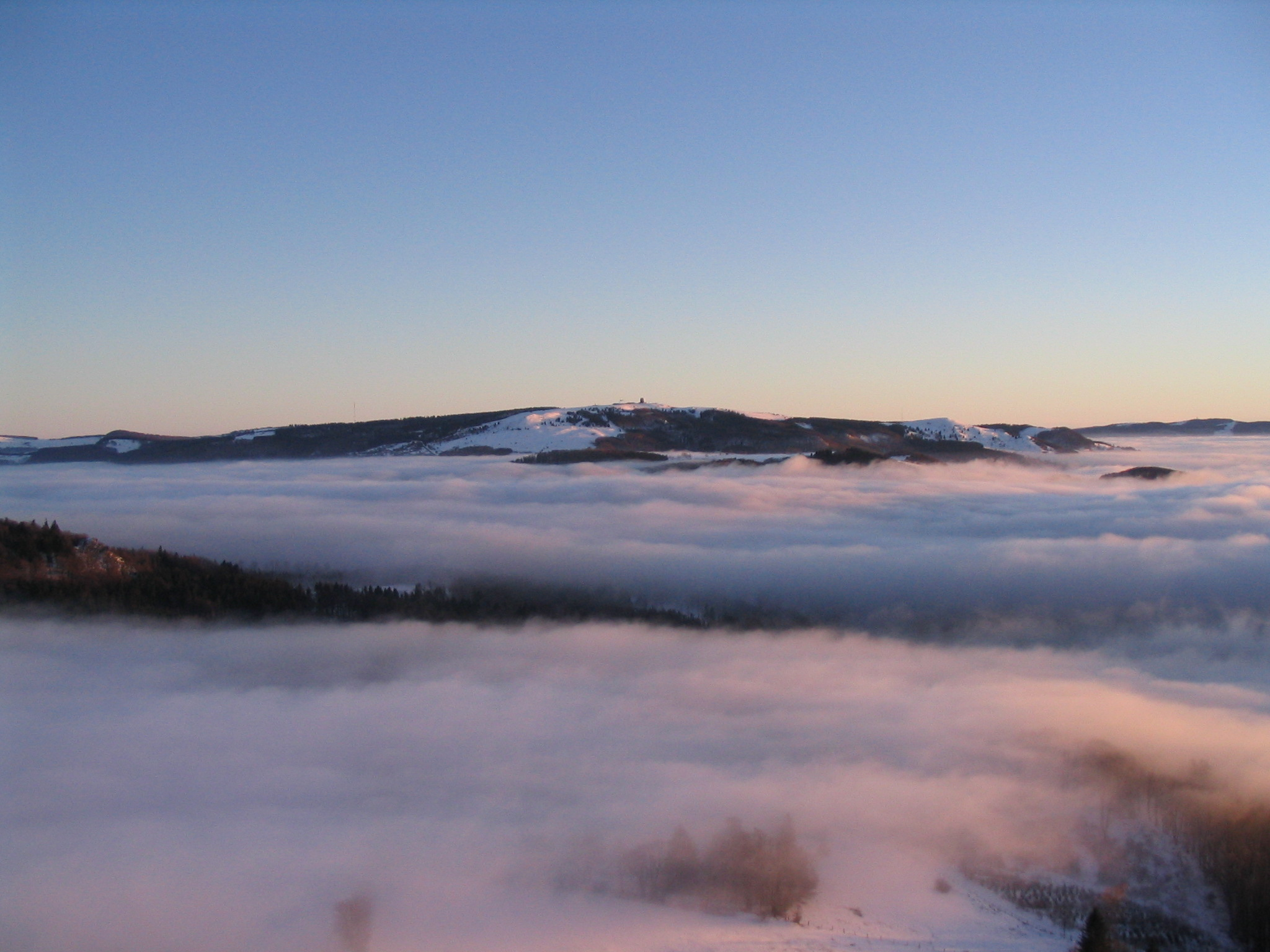
Wasserkuppe (Rhön)

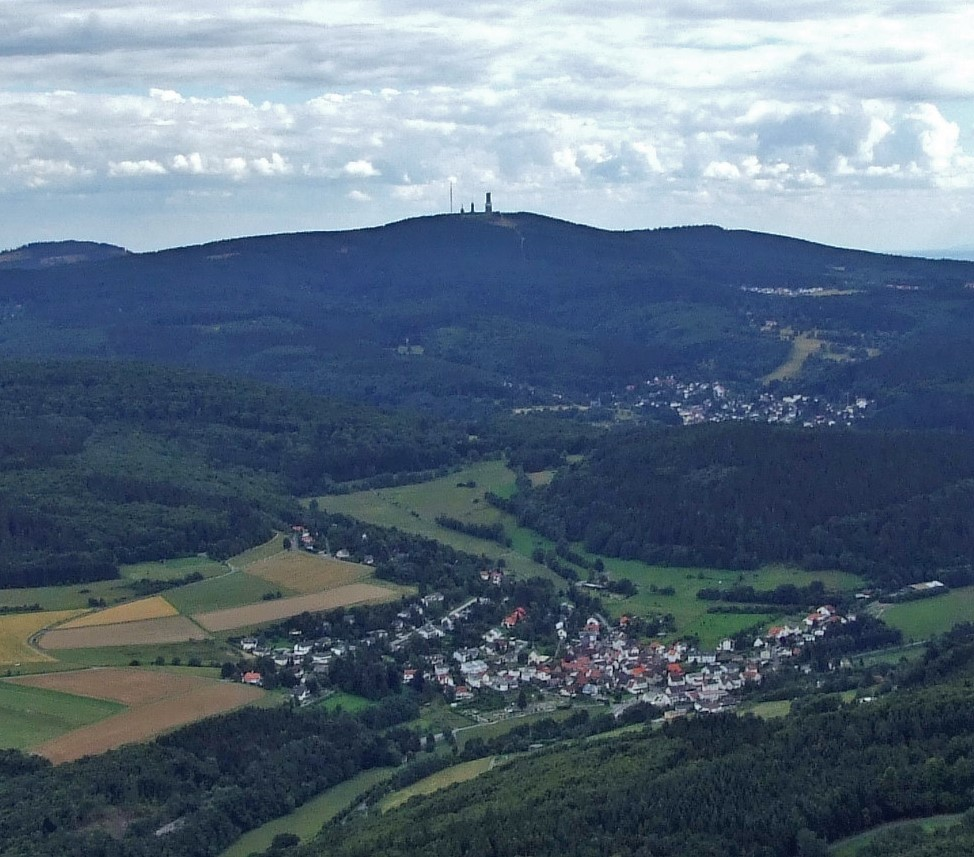
Großer Feldberg (Taunus)

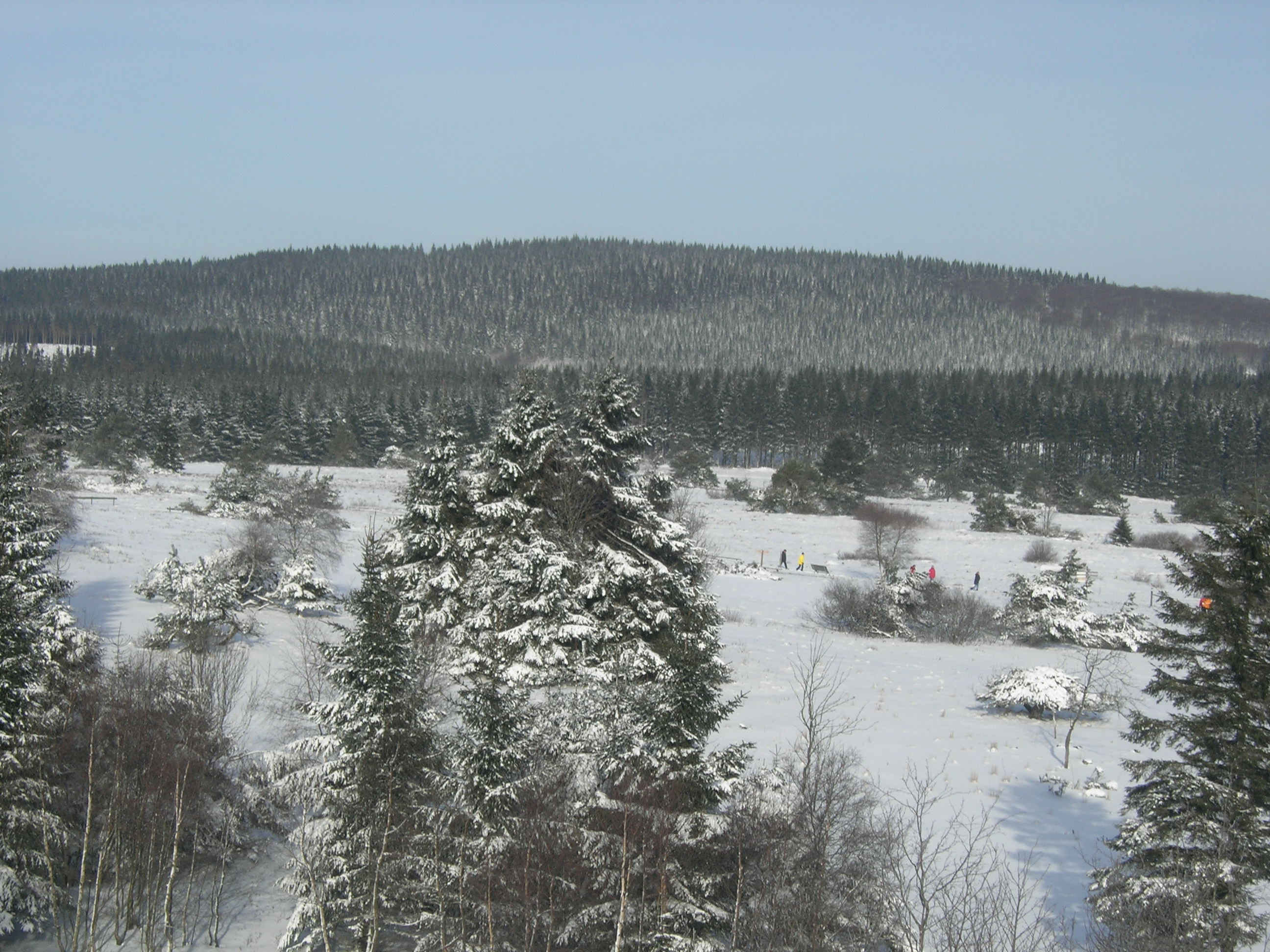
Langenberg (Rothaargebirge)

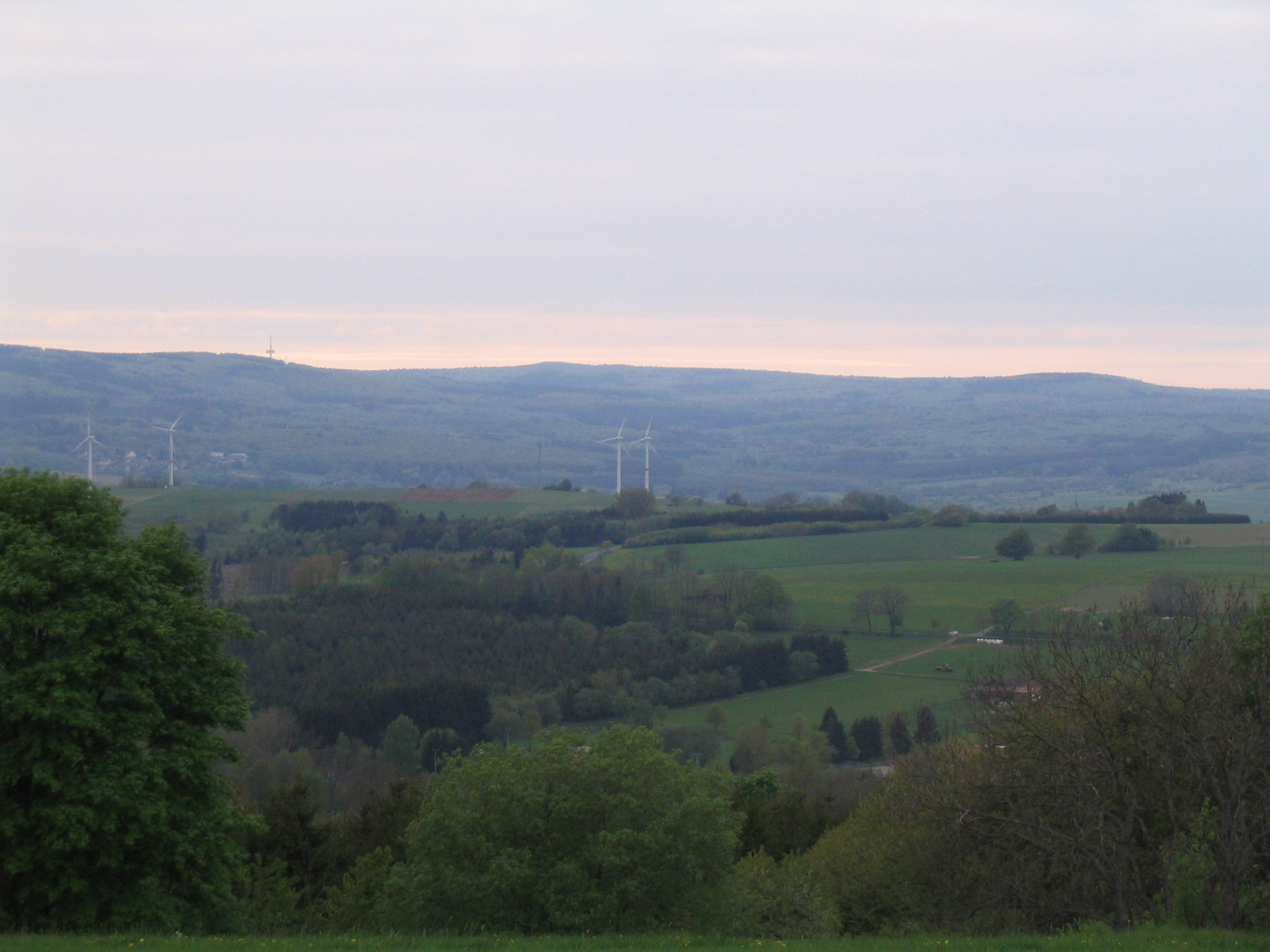
Taufstein (Vogelsberg)

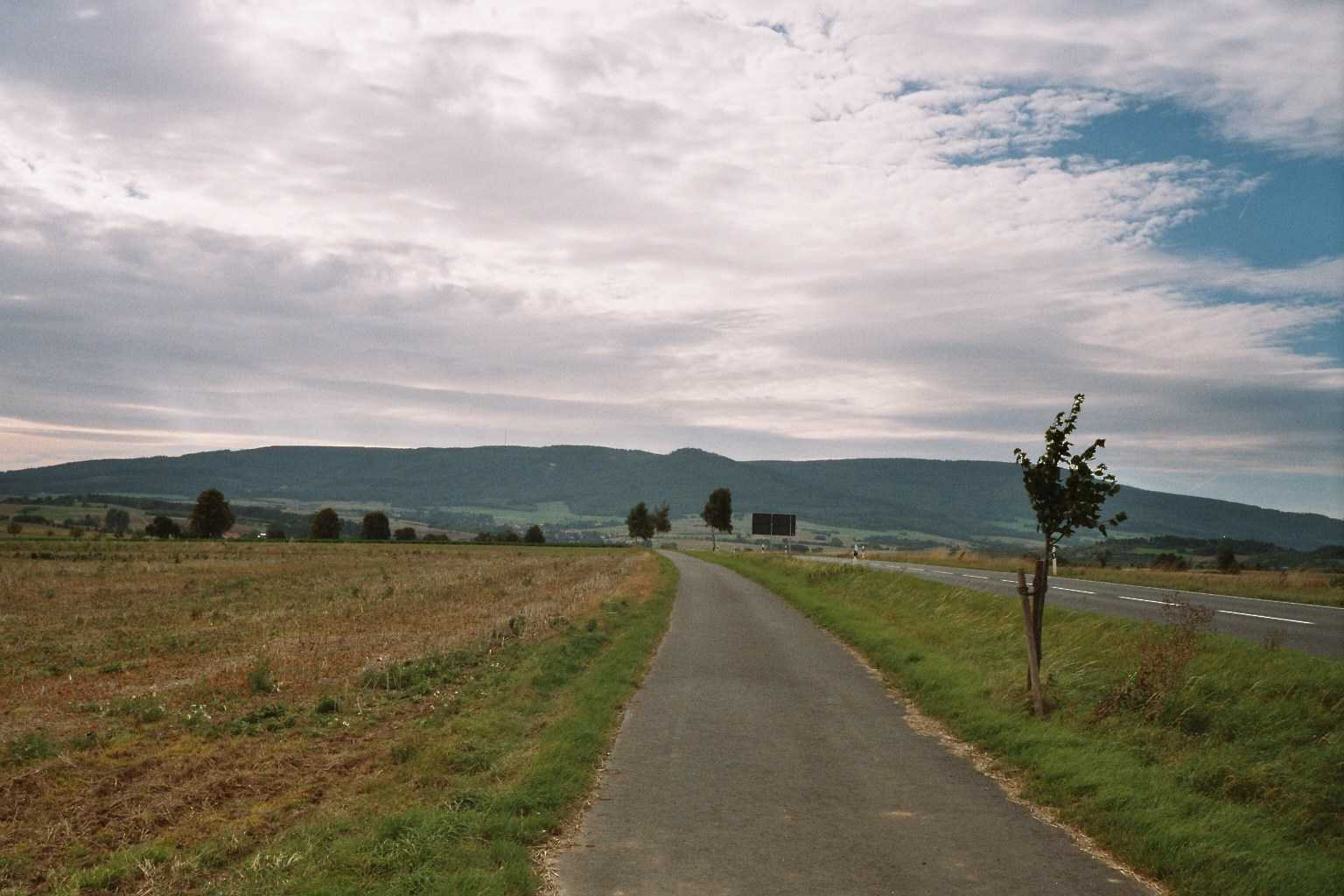
Kasseler Kuppe (Hoher Meißner)

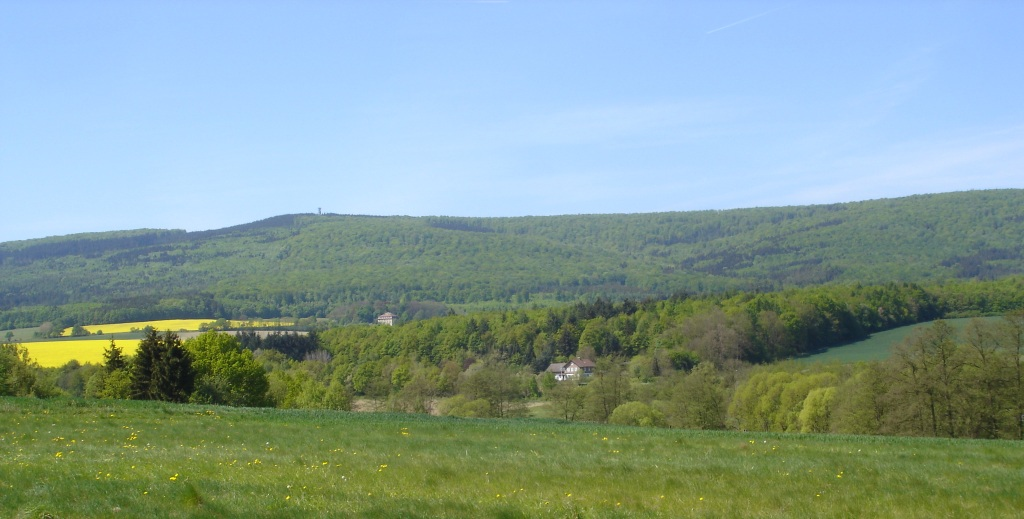
Wüstegarten (Kellerwald)

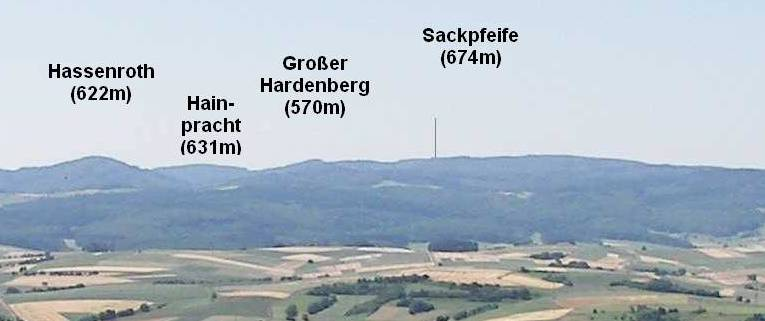
Sackpfeife (Hessian Hinterland)

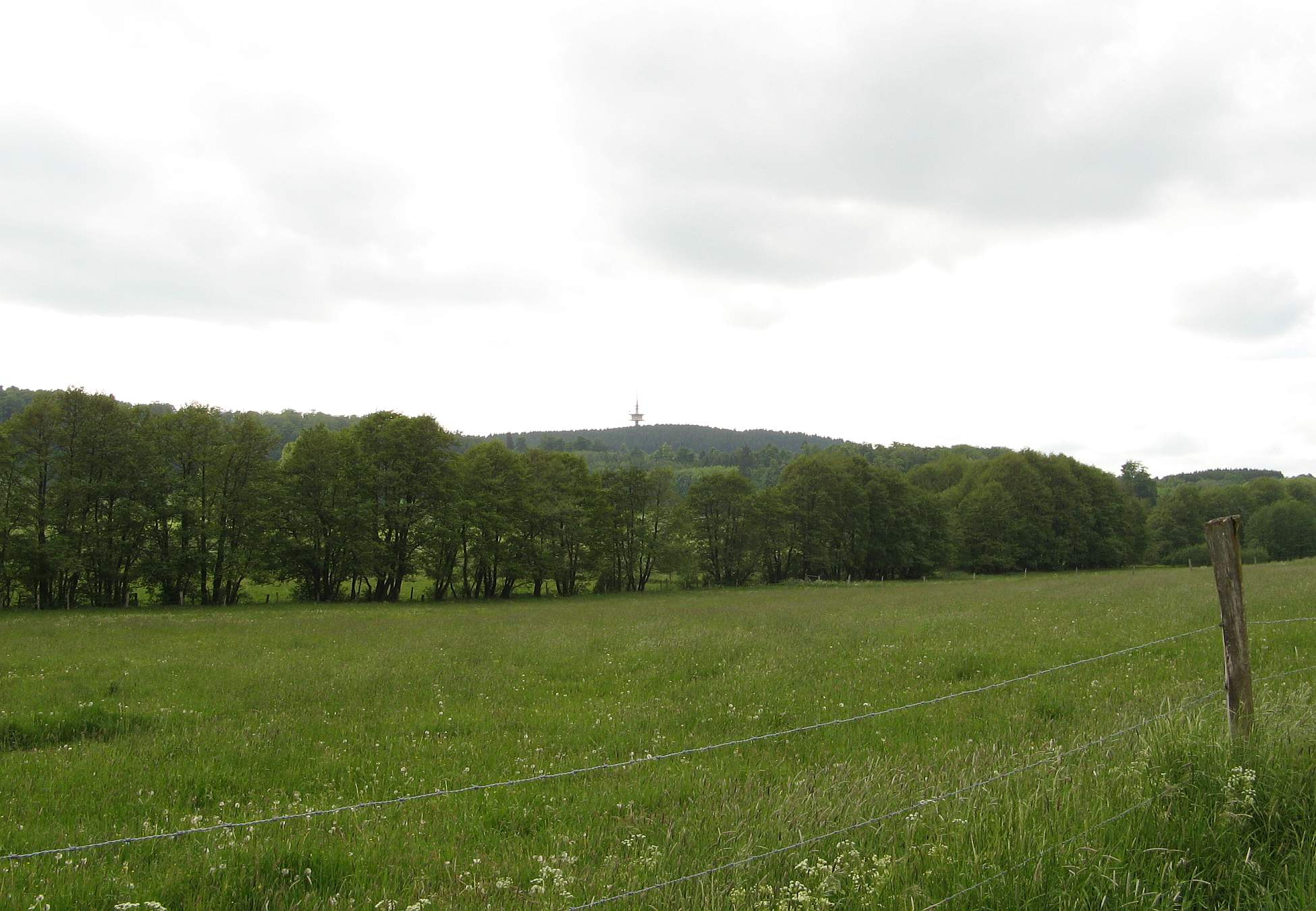
Höllberg (Westerwald)

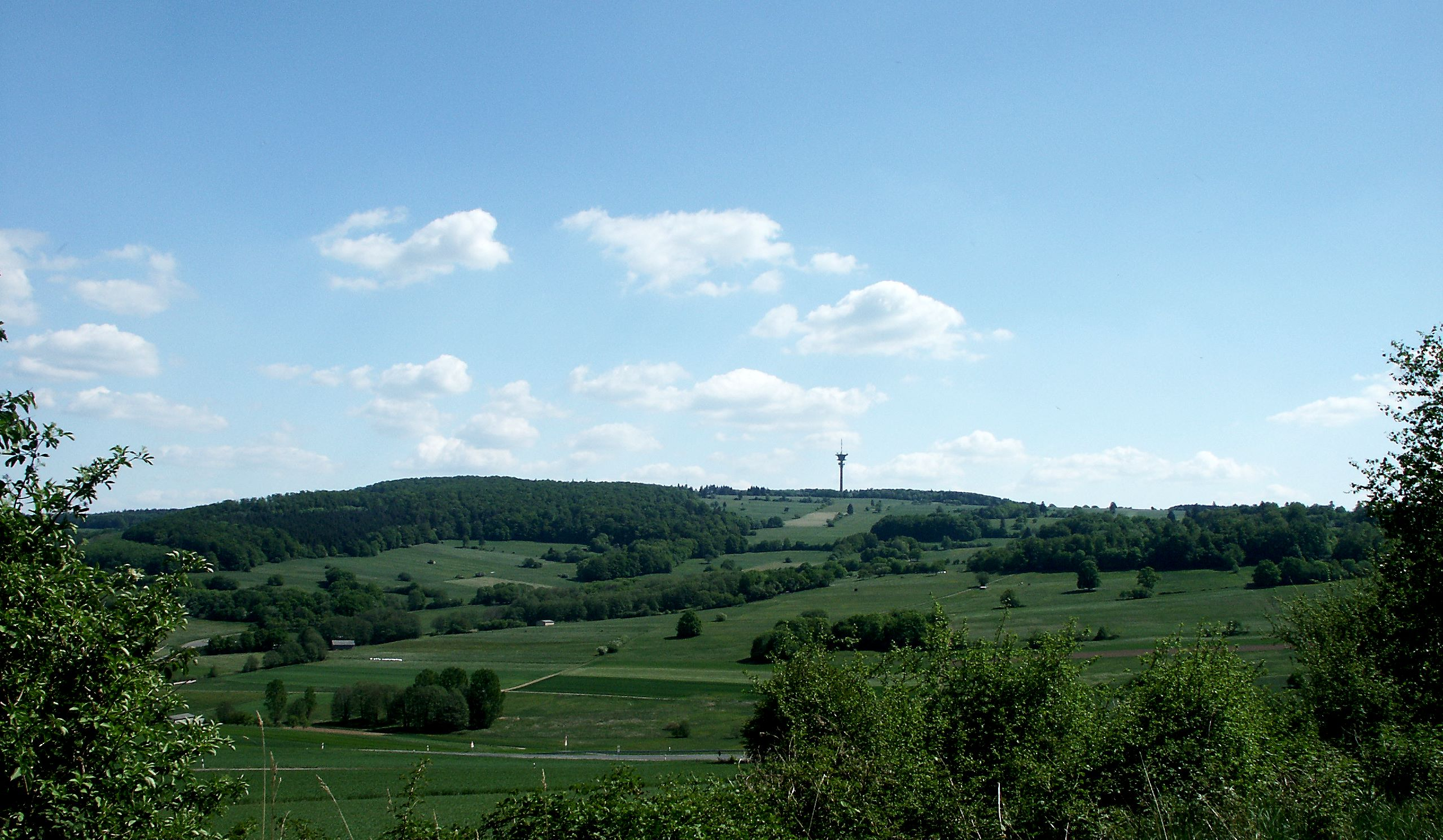
Eisenberg (Knüllgebirge)

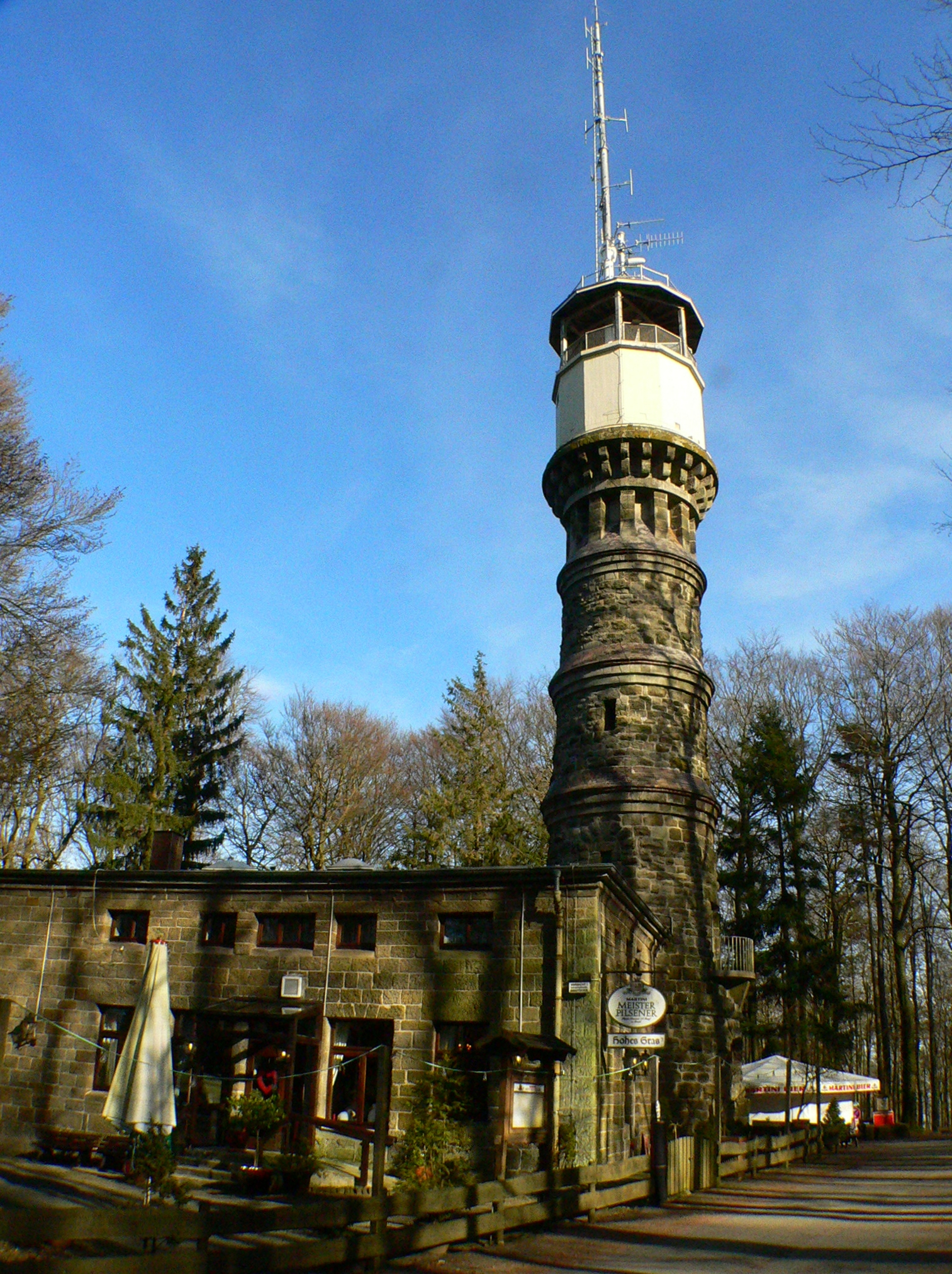
Hohes Gras (Habichtswald Uplands)

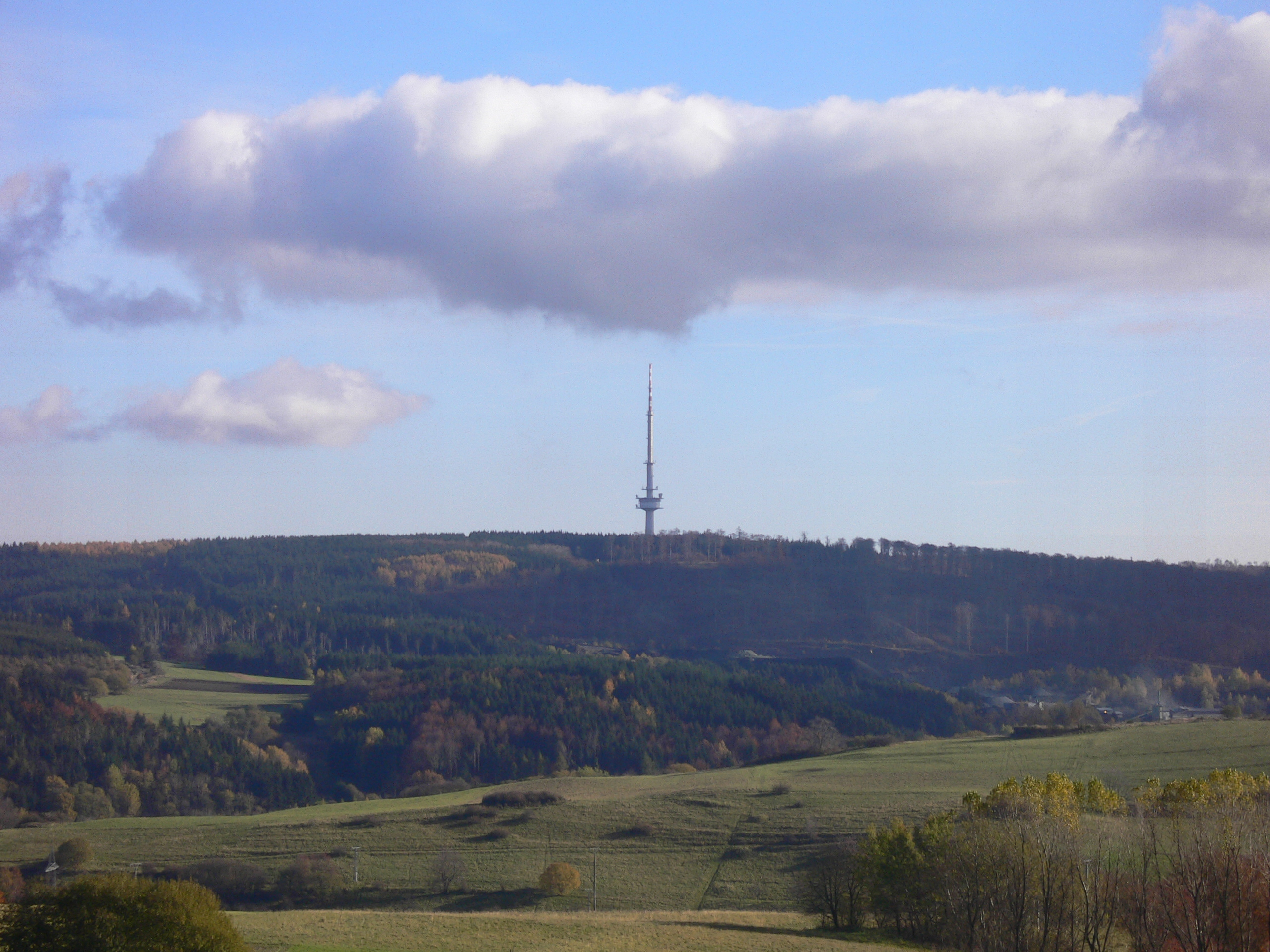
Angelburg (Gladenbach Uplands)

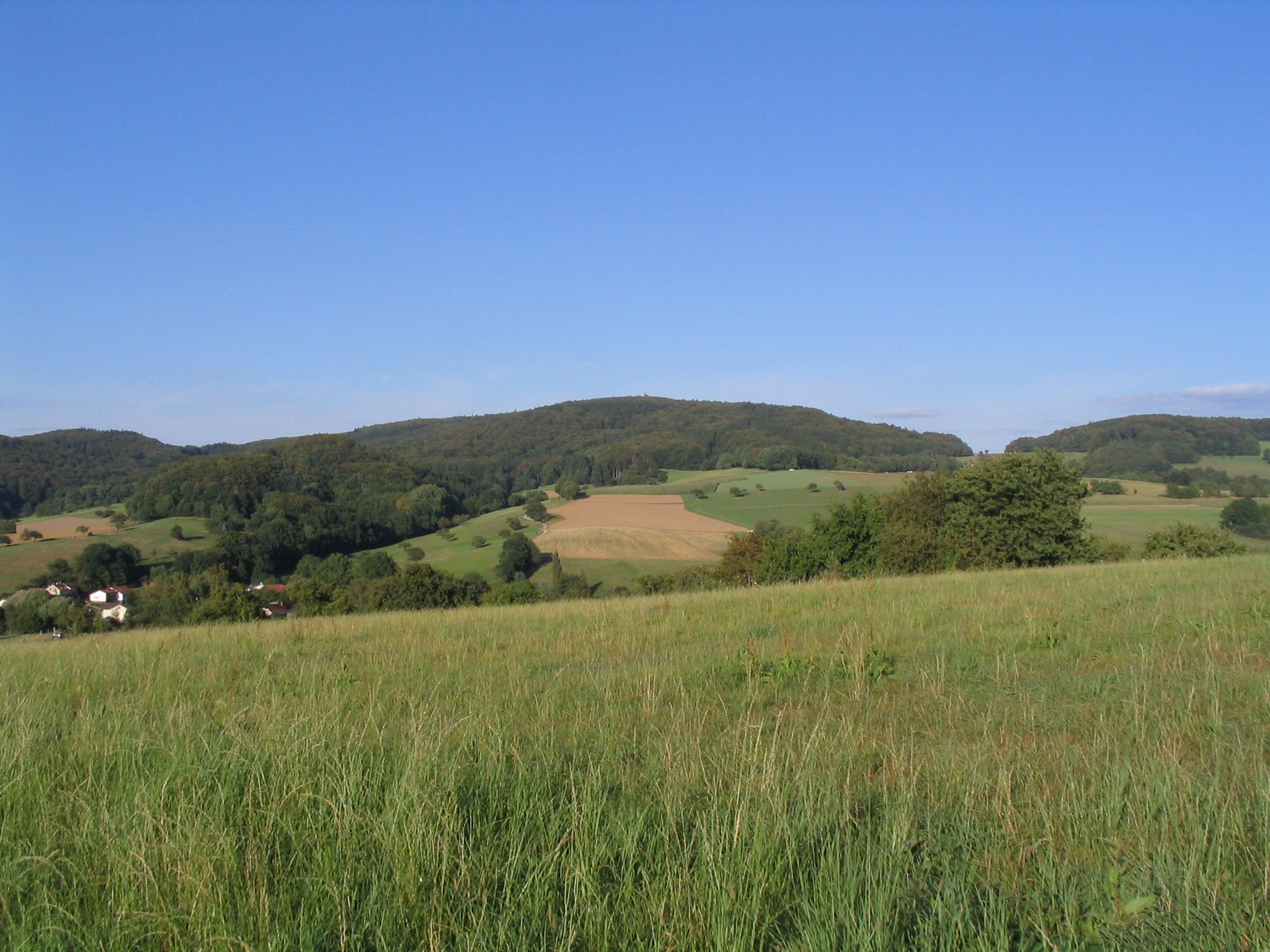
Neunkircher Höhe (Odenwald)

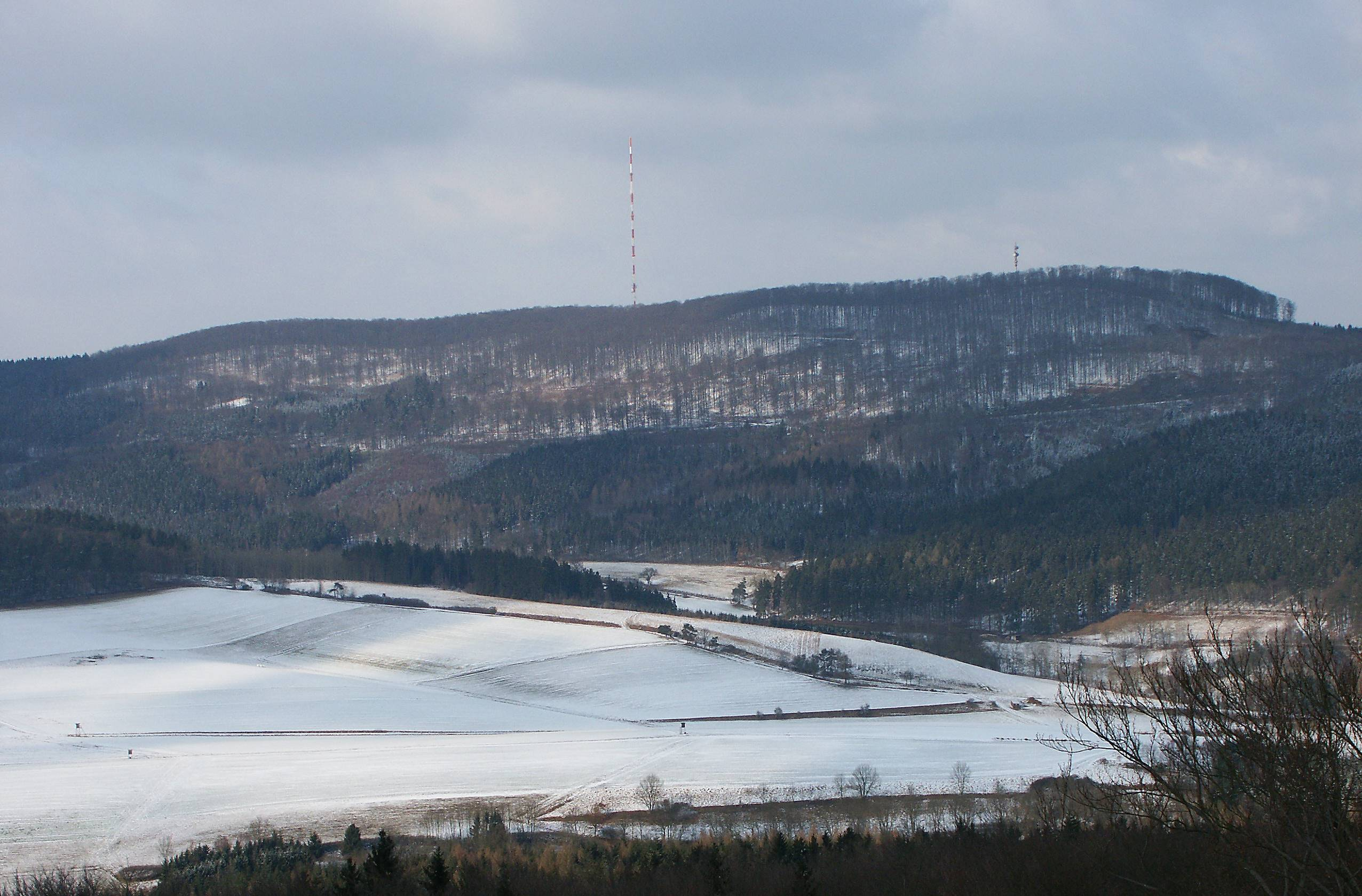
Rimberg (Fulda-Haune Tableland)

Clicking on the word "List" in the Lists column, takes you to a list of other mountains and hills in the selected region (some of which extend beyond the borders of Hesse). The table is sorted by height, but may be resorted by clicking on the symbol in the appropriate column header.

Highest mountain	Height (m)	Region	Lists	Province (Regierungsbezirk)
Wasserkuppe	950.0	Rhön	List	Kassel
Großer Feldberg	881.5	Taunus	List	Darmstadt
Taufstein	773.0	Vogelsberg	List	Gießen

== Highest mountains and hills in Hesse’s landscapes and natural regions ==
The following table lists the highest mountains and hills of the various Hessian landscape and natural regions.

In the Landscape column the major Central Upland ranges and landscapes are listed in bold; the smaller, local subranges or basins (with prominent island-like hills) are listed in italics. Clicking on the word “List” in the Lists column, takes you to a list of other mountains and hills in the respective landscape or region. By clicking on MU in the column you will be taken to the article on the natural regional Major unit to which the landscape belongs.

The table is sorted by height but may be resorted by clicking on the symbols in the relevant column header.

Mountain / Hill	Height (m)	Landscape	Lists	MU	District (county)/ (or states)
Wasserkuppe	950.0	**Rhön**	List	354	Fulda
Großer Feldberg	881.5	**Taunus**	List	301	High Taunus
Langenberg	843.2	**Rothaar Mountains** (Upland (Hesse))	List (List)	333; 333	Waldeck-Frankenberg (Hessen); Hochsauerland (North Rhine-Westphalia)
Taufstein	773.0	**Vogelsberg**	List	351	Vogelsberg
Kasseler Kuppe	753.6	Hoher Meißner, **Fulda-Werra Uplands**	List	357	Werra-Meißner
Wüstegarten	675.3	**Kellerwald**	List	344	Schwalm-Eder; Waldeck-Frankenberg
Sackpfeife	673.5	Hessian Hinterland (Rothaar Mountains)	--- (List)	333	Waldeck-Frankenberg; Marburg-Biedenkopf
Hirschberg	643.4	Söhre, Fulda-Werra Uplands (part of the **Kaufungen Forest**)	List (List)	357; 357	Werra-Meißner
Höllberg	642.8	**Westerwald**	List	322	Lahn-Dill
Bilstein	641.2	Kaufungen Forest, Fulda-Werra Uplands (except the Söhre)	List (List)	357; 357	Werra-Meißner
Eisenberg	635.5	**Knüll**	List	356	Hersfeld-Rotenburg
Hohes Gras	614.8	**Habichtswald Uplands** (or Hoher Habichtswald)	List; List	342 (342)	Kassel (kreisfreie Stadt); Lkr. Kassel
Angelburg	609.4	**Gladenbach Uplands**	List	320	Lahn-Dill
Neunkircher Höhe	605.0	**Odenwald**	List	145	Darmstadt-Dieburg
Großer Bärenberg	600.7	Hinterhabichtswald Kuppen	List	342	Kassel
Rimberg	591.8	Fulda-Haune Tableland	List	355	Hersfeld-Rotenburg
Eisberg	583.0	Stölzinger Hills	List	357	Werra-Meißner
Hoher Dörnberg	578.7	Dörnberg and Schreckenberge	List	342	Kassel
Hohestein	569.0	Gobert	List	483	Werra-Meißner
Hermannskoppe	567.1	**Spessart**	List	141	Main-Kinzig (Hessen); Main-Spessart (Bayern)
Himmelsberg	563.7	Melsungen Uplands	List	357	Werra-Meißner
Schwengeberg	556.7	Langenberge	List	342	Schwalm-Eder
Monte Kali	530	Seulingswald	List	357	Hersfeld-Rotenburg
Fuldaer Wäldchen	529.2	Landrücken	List	353	Fulda
Isthaberg	523.1	Ostwaldecker Randsenken	List	341	Kassel
Melibokus	517.0	Western (Anterior) Odenwald	List	145	Kreis Bergstraße
Rabenkuppe	514.8	Ringgau	List	483	Werra-Meißner
Burgberg	499.9	Hoofer Pforte	List	342	Kassel
Dünsberg	497.7	Südl. Gladenbach Uplands	List	320	Gießen
Rimberg	497.1	Damshäuser Kuppen	List	320	Marburg-Biedenkopf
Weidelsberg	492.3	Waldecken Forest	List	340	Kassel
Herzberg	478.2	Richelsdorf Hills	List	357	Hersfeld-Rotenburg
Hundsrück	477.5	Schlierbachswald	List	357	Werra-Meißner
Schweinskopf (Hinterland)	473	Damshäuser Kuppen	List	320	Marburg-Biedenkopf
Staufenberg	472.2	**Reinhardswald**	List	370	Kassel
Escheberg	448.9	Malsburg Forest	List	342	Kassel
Knebelsrod	443.1	Burgwald	List	345	Waldeck-Frankenberg
Hammelsberg	415.6	Büdingen	---	143	Main-Kinzig
Mardorfer Kuppe	406.8	Vorderer Vogelsberg	List	349	Marburg-Biedenkopf
Ortenberg	379.4	Lahnberge	List	348	Marburg-Biedenkopf
Vogelheerd	369.8	Marburg Ridge	List	348	Marburg-Biedenkopf
Amöneburg	363.0	Amöneburg Basin	---	347	Marburg-Biedenkopf

== Mountains and hills across the whole of Hesse ==
Name, Height, Location (district/county, landscape/region)

- Wasserkuppe (950.0 m), county of Fulda, Rhön; highest mountain in the Rhön and in Hesse
- Dammersfeldkuppe (927.9 m), Hessian/Bavarian border, Rhön
- Heidelstein (925.7 m), Hessian/Bavarian border, Rhön
- Eierhauckberg (909.9 m), Hessian/Bavarian border, Rhön
- Abtsrodaer Kuppe (904.8 m), county of Fulda, Rhön
- Stirnberg (901.9 m), Hessian/Bavarian border, Rhön
- Hohe Hölle (893.8 m), Hessian/Bavarian border, Rhön
- Steinkopf (888 m), border Hesse/Bavarian, Rhön
- Himmeldunkberg (887.9 m), Hessian/Bavarian border, Rhön
- Großer Feldberg (881.5 m), Hochtaunuskreis, Taunus; highest mountain of South Hesse
- Mittelberg (880 m), Hessian/Bavarian border, Rhön
- Pferdskopf (874.9 m), county of Fulda, Rhön
- Beilstein (864.6 m), Hessian/Bavarian border, Rhön
- Schachen (857.0 m), Hessian/Bavarian border, Rhön
- Reesberg (851.2 m), county of Fulda, Rhön
- Rommerser Berg (850.2 m), county of Fulda, Rhön
- Ottilienstein (846.4 m), county of Fulda, Rhön
- Rabenstein (845.0 m), border Hesse/Bavarian, Rhön
- Langenberg (843.2 m), Hessian/North Rhine-Westphalian border, Rothaar Mountains, Upland; highest mountain in North Hesse and Northwest Germany (outside of the Harz)
- Hegekopf (842.9 m), Waldeck-Frankenberg, Rothaar Mountains, Upland
- Simmelsberg (842.7 m), county of Fulda, Rhön
- Ettelsberg (837.7 m), Waldeck-Frankenberg, Rothaar Mountains, Upland
- Milseburg (835.2 m), county of Fulda, Rhön
- Mathesberg (831.8 m), county of Fulda, Rhön
- Schafstein (831.8 m), county of Fulda, Rhön
- Hopperkopf (832.3 m), Hessian/North Rhine-Westphalian border, Rothaar Mountains, Upland
- Kleiner Feldberg (825.2 m), Hochtaunuskreis, Taunus
- Ottersteine (821.3 m), county of Fulda, Rhön
- Eubeberg (820 m), county of Fulda, Rhön
- Ehrenberg (816.5 m), county of Fulda, Rhön
- Feldberg (815.2 m), county of Fulda, Rhön
- Mühlenkopf (815 m), Waldeck-Frankenberg, Rothaar Mountains, Upland
- Hoher Eimberg (806.1 m), Hessian/North Rhine-Westphalian border, Rothaar Mountains, Upland
- Hoppernkopf (805.0 m), Hessian/North Rhine-Westphalian border, Rothaar Mountains, Upland
- Dalherdakuppe (800.6 m), county of Fulda, Rhön
- Kesselstein (800 m), county of Fulda, Rhön
- Mittelsberg (801 m), Waldeck-Frankenberg, Rothaar Mountains, Upland
- Altkönig (798.2 m, hillfort), Hochtaunuskreis, Taunus
- Hohe Pön (792.7 m), Waldeck-Frankenberg, Rothaar Mountains, Upland
- Weiherberg (786 m), county of Fulda, Rhön
- Kutenberg (785 m), Hessian/North Rhine-Westphalian border, Rothaar Mountains, Upland
- Dreiskopf (781 m), Hessian/North Rhine-Westphalian border, Rothaar Mountains, Upland
- Kahle Pön (775.3 m), Hessian/North Rhine-Westphalian border, Rothaar Mountains, Upland
- Taufstein (773.0 m), Vogelsbergkreis, Vogelsberg; highest mountain in Middle Hesse
- Dungberg (772.7 m), Hessian/Thuringian border, Rhön
- Großer Nallenberg (768.3 m), county of Fulda, Rhön
- Hoherodskopf (764 m), Vogelsbergkreis, Vogelsberg
- Auersberg (757 m), county of Fulda, Rhön
- Kasseler Kuppe (753.6 m), Werra-Meißner-Kreis, Hoher Meißner; highest mountain of Northeast Hesse
- Sieben Ahorn (753 m), Vogelsbergkreis, Vogelsberg
- Kasseler Stein (748 m), Werra-Meißner-Kreis, Hoher Meißner
- Buchschirm (746 m), county of Fulda, Rhön
- Emmet (742.5 m), Waldeck-Frankenberg, Rothaar Mountains, Upland
- Auf’m Knoll (738 m), Waldeck-Frankenberg, Rothaar Mountains, Upland
- Dommel (738.0 m), Waldeck-Frankenberg, Rothaar Mountains, Upland
- Musenberg (738 m), Waldeck-Frankenberg
- Herchenhainer Höhe (733 m), Vogelsbergkreis, Vogelsberg
- Stellberg (727 m), county of Fulda, Rhön
- Schneeberg (726.3 m), Waldeck-Frankenberg, Rothaar Mountains, Upland
- Sähre (726 m), Waldeck-Frankenberg, Rothaar Mountains, Upland
- Iberg (720.5 m), Waldeck-Frankenberg, Rothaar Mountains, Upland
- Geiselstein (720 m), Vogelsbergkreis, Vogelsberg
- Kalbe (720 m), Werra-Meißner-Kreis, Hoher Meißner
- Nesselberg (716 m), Vogelsbergkreis, Vogelsberg
- Koppen (715.1 m), Waldeck-Frankenberg, Rothaar Mountains, Upland
- Osterkopf (708.5 m), Waldeck-Frankenberg, Rothaar Mountains, Upland
- Maulkuppe (706 m), county of Fulda, Rhön
- Wachtküppel (705 m), "Spitzbub", county of Fulda, Rhön
- Kleiner Nallenberg (704.1 m), county of Fulda, Rhön
- Orenberg (702.0 m), Waldeck-Frankenberg, Rothaar Mountains, Upland
- Weilsberg (700.7 m), Hochtaunuskreis, Taunus
- Gebrannter Rücken (698 m), Waldeck-Frankenberg, Rothaar Mountains, near Battenberg
- Ebersberg (689 m), county of Fulda, Rhön
- Glaskopf (686.8 m), Hochtaunuskreis, Taunus
- Kolbenberg (684.0 m), Hochtaunuskreis, Taunus
- Klingenkopf (682.7 m), Hochtaunuskreis, Taunus
- Dillenberg (682.4 m), Hochtaunuskreis, Taunus
- Wüstegarten (675.3 m), Schwalm-Eder-Kreis/Waldeck-Frankenberg, Kellerwald
- Lippestriesch (674.6 m), Waldeck-Frankenberg, near Bromskirchen
- Sackpfeife (673.5 m), Waldeck-Frankenberg/Marburg-Biedenkopf, Rothaar Mountains/Lahn-Dill Uplands
- Tannenfels (669 m), county of Fulda, Rhön
- Bilstein (Vogelsberg) (666 m), Vogelsbergkreis, Vogelsberg
- Sängelberg (665.0 m), Hochtaunuskreis, Taunus
- Gackerstein (663 m), Vogelsbergkreis, Vogelsberg
- Pferdskopf (662.6 m), Hochtaunuskreis, Taunus
- Weißeberg (660.2 m), Hochtaunuskreis, Taunus
- Hohes Lohr (656.7 m), Waldeck-Frankenberg, Kellerwald
- Steinwand (646 m), county of Fulda, Rhön
- Hohe Warte (644.8 m), Waldeck-Frankenberg, Rothaar Mountains
- Hirschberg (Kaufungen Forest) (643.4 m), Werra-Meißner-Kreis, Kaufungen Forest/Söhre
- Buchholz (643 m), Waldeck-Frankenberg, Hatzfeld Forest
- Buchholz (643 m), Waldeck-Frankenberg, Hatzfeld Forest
- Höllberg (642.8 m), Lahn-Dill-Kreis, Westerwald; highest mountain in the Hessian part of the Westerwald
- Bilstein (Kaufungen Forest) (641.2 m), Werra-Meißner-Kreis, Kaufungen Forest
- Roßkopf (max. 640 m), Hochtaunuskreis, Taunus
- Große Aschkoppe (639.8 m), Waldeck-Frankenberg, Kellerwald
- Krimmelberg (639.7 m), Hochtaunuskreis, Taunus
- Hühnerberg (Taunus) (636.0 m), Rheingau-Taunus-Kreis, Taunus
- Junkernberg (636.0 m), Hochtaunuskreis, Taunus
- Hunsrück (635.9 m), Schwalm-Eder-Kreis, Kellerwald
- Eisenberg (Knüll) (635.5 m), Hersfeld-Rotenburg, Knüll
- Knüllköpfchen (634 m), Schwalm-Eder-Kreis, Knüll
- Fauleberg (633.4 m), Hochtaunuskreis, Taunus
- Großer Eichwald (633.2 m), Hochtaunuskreis, Taunus
- Hainpracht (631 m), Waldeck-Frankenberg, Hatzfeld Forest
- Soisberg (630 m), county of Fulda/Hersfeld-Rotenburg, Kuppenrhön, Rhön
- Traddelkopf (626.4 m), Waldeck-Frankenberg, Kellerwald
- Hassenroth (622 m), Marburg-Biedenkopf, Rothaar Mountains
- Eichkopf (Dornholzhausen) (620.2 m), Hochtaunuskreis, Taunus
- Hauberg (619 m), Vogelsbergkreis, Vogelsberg
- Kalte Herberge (619.3 m), Rheingau-Taunus-Kreis, Taunus
- Bremer Berg (618.9 m), Hochtaunuskreis, Taunus
- Auf der Baar (618 m), Lahn-Dill-Kreis, Westerwald
- Hohe Wurzel (617.9 m), Rheingau-Taunus-Kreis, Taunus
- Winterberg (616.6 m), Waldeck-Frankenberg, Kellerwald
- Hollerkopf (615.5 m), Hochtaunuskreis, Taunus
- Hohes Gras (614.8 m), city of Kassel, Habichtswald Uplands
- Bartenstein (614 m), Lahn-Dill-Kreis, Westerwald
- Judenkopf (613.8 m), Hochtaunuskreis, Taunus
- Auenberg (610.7 m), Waldeck-Frankenberg, Kellerwald
- Angelburg (609.4 m), Lahn-Dill-Kreis, Schelderwald/Gladenbach Uplands
- Bubenberg (609 m), Waldeck-Frankenberg, Rothaar Mountains, near Hatzfeld
- Uhlenstein (607.5 m), county of Kassel, Habichtswald Uplands
- Mühlenstein (607.2 m), Werra-Meißner-Kreis, Kaufungen Forest
- Weißer Stein (Vogelsberg) (607 m), near Bermuthshain in Vogelsberg
- Einsiedler (606.6 m), Hochtaunuskreis, Taunus
- Knoten (605.4 m), Lahn-Dill-Kreis, Westerwald
- Neunkircher Höhe (605.0 m), Kreis Bergstraße, Odenwald; highest hill in the Hessian part of the Odenwald
- Hohe Egge (604.9), Waldeck-Frankenberg, Rothaar Mountains
- Dicker Kopf (603.7 m), Waldeck-Frankenberg, Kellerwald
- Großer Bärenberg (600.7 m), county of Kassel, Habichtswald Uplands
- Essigberg (Hoher Habichtswald; 597.5 m), county of Kassel, Habichtswald Uplands
- Klingenberg (597.5 m), Hochtaunuskreis, Taunus
- Großer Steinhaufen (597.0 m), city of Kassel, Habichtswald Uplands
- Pfaffenrod (596.2 m), Hochtaunuskreis, Taunus
- Frauenstein (596 m), county of Fulda, Landrücken
- Feldkopf (596.0 m), Hochtaunuskreis, Taunus
- Hardberg (Odenwald) (593 m), Kreis Bergstraße, Odenwald
- Köpfchen (593 m), Schwalm-Eder-Kreis, Knüll
- Hohe Kanzel (591.8 m), Rheingau-Taunus-Kreis, Taunus
- Rimberg (591.8 m), Hersfeld-Rotenburg, Knüll
- Arennest (591.5)
- Herzberg (591.4 m), Hochtaunuskreis, Taunus
- Giebelrain (590 m), county of Fulda, Rhön
- Schmittgrund (590 m), Lahn-Dill-Kreis, Schelderwald
- Stiefelhöhe (589 m), border Hesse/Baden-Württemberg, Odenwald
- Eschenburg (589 m), Lahn-Dill-Kreis, Lahn-Dill Uplands, western Schelderwald
- Görzberg (588 m), Marburg-Biedenkopf, Rothaar Mountains, westlich Gemeinde Wiesenbach
- Hohlstein (587.8 m), Waldeck-Frankenberg, Kellerwald
- Pfaffenkopf (586.9 m), Hochtaunuskreis, Taunus
- Jeust (585.0 m), Schwalm-Eder-Kreis/Waldeck-Frankenberg, Kellerwald
- Steinberg (585 m), Werra-Meißner-Kreis, Kaufungen Forest
- Sauklippe (584.4 m), Schwalm-Eder-Kreis, Kellerwald
- Eisberg (583.0 m), Werra-Meißner-Kreis, Stölzinger Hills
- Biemerberg (582.2 m), Hochtaunuskreis, Taunus
- Bilsenkopf (582 m), Waldeck-Frankenberg, Kellerwald
- Hallgarter Zange (580.5 m), Rheingau-Taunus-Kreis, Taunus
- Haferberg (580.4 m), Werra-Meißner-Kreis/Göttingen, Kaufungen Forest
- Erbacher Kopf (579.8 m), Rheingau-Taunus-Kreis, Taunus
- Kalteiche (579.3 m), Lahn-Dill-Kreis, Westerwald
- Hoher Dörnberg (578.7 m), county of Kassel, Habichtswald Uplands
- Tromm (577 m), Kreis Bergstraße, Odenwald
- Krehberg (576 m), Kreis Bergstraße, Odenwald
- Ahrensberg (570 m), county of Kassel, Habichtswald Uplands
- Steinkopf (569.8 m), Hochtaunuskreis, Taunus
- Hohestein (569.0 m), Werra-Meißner-Kreis, Gobert
- Hohestein (569 m), Werra-Meißner-Kreis, near Bad-Sooden-Allendorf
- Großer Gudenberg (568.7 m), county of Kassel, Habichtswald Uplands
- Hermannskoppe (567.1 m), border Hesse/Bavarian, Spessart; highest hill in the Hessian part of the Spessart
- Talgang (566.1 m), Waldeck-Frankenberg, Kellerwald
- Langenberg (565.0 m), Werra-Meißner-Kreis, Kaufungen Forest
- Ziegenkopf (564.7 m), city of Kassel, Habichtswald Uplands
- Würgeloh (563.9 m), Marburg-Biedenkopf, Schelderwald, Bottenhorn Plateau
- Himmelsberg (563.7 m), Schwalm-Eder-Kreis, Günsteröder Höhe, Melsung Uplands
- Eichkopf (Ruppertshain) (563.3 m), Hochtaunuskreis, im Taunus
- Pentersrück (562.2 m), Schwalm-Eder-Kreis, Günsteröder Höhe, Melsung Uplands
- Eisenberg (Korbach) (562 m), Waldeck-Frankenberg, Rothaar Mountains
- Rahnsberg (561 m), Rothaar
- Johannisköppe (557 m), Waldeck-Frankenberg, Rothaar Mountains/Lahn-Dill Uplands
- Schwengeberg (556.7 m), Schwalm-Eder-Kreis, Habichtswald Uplands
- Naxburg (553 m), Vogelsbergkreis, Vogelsberg
- Stallberg (Rhön) (553 m), county of Fulda, Kuppenrhön, Rhön
- Daubhaus (552 m), Marburg-Biedenkopf, eastern Bottenhorn Plateau
- Horst (552 m), Vogelsbergkreis, Vogelsberg
- Tiefenrother Höhe (551 m), Lahn-Dill-Kreis, Westerwald
- Alheimer (548.7 m), Hersfeld-Rotenburg, Stölzinger Hills
- Mappershainer Kopf (548.0 m), Rheingau-Taunus-Kreis, Taunus
- Spessartskopf (547 m), Kreis Bergstraße, Odenwald
- Falkenberg (546 m), Odenwaldkreis, Odenwald
- Wolfsküppel (545.1 m), Hochtaunuskreis, Taunus
- Kaulenberg (545 m), county of Kassel, Habichtswald Uplands
- Grauer Kopf (543.4 m), Hesse/Rhineland-Palatinate border, Rheingau-Taunus-Kreis/Rhein-Lahn-Kreis, Taunus
- Ochsenwurzelskopf (542.2 m), Waldeck-Frankenberg, Kellerwald
- Kleiner Steinberg (541.9 m), county of Göttingen, Kaufungen Forest
- Großer Steinberg (541.8 m), county of Göttingen, Kaufungen Forest
- Horst (540 m), Main-Kinzig-Kreis, Spessart
- Hohekopf (539.4 m), Werra-Meißner-Kreis, Rommerode Hill Country
- Rassel (539.4 m), Wiesbaden, Taunus
- Ermerod (539.2 m), Waldeck-Frankenberg, Kellerwald
- Waldskopf (538 m), Kreis Bergstraße, Odenwald
- Alte Höhe (536 m), Vogelsbergkreis, Vogelsberg
- Rohrberg (535.6 m), Werra-Meißner-Kreis, Kaufungen Forest/Söhre
- Elfbuchen (535 m), city of Kassel, Habichtswald Uplands
- Laufskopf (534.8 m), Schwalm-Eder-Kreis, Habichtswald Uplands, Habichtswald Uplands
- Wagenberg (535 m), Kreis Bergstraße, Odenwald
- Breiter Berg (533.2 m), Schwalm-Eder-Kreis, Werra-Meißner-Kreis, Melsung Uplands
- Nimerich (533 m), Kreis Marburg-Biedenkopf, Lahn-Dill Uplands
- Appelsberg (Rhön) (532 m), county of Fulda, Kuppenrhön, Rhön
- Steinbergskopf (532 m), counties of Göttingen and Werra-Meißner-Kreis, Kaufungen Forest
- Monte Kali (530 m), Hersfeld-Rotenburg, Seulingswald
- Flörsbacher Höhe (529 m), Main-Kinzig-Kreis, Spessart
- Bielstein (527.8 m), county of Kassel, Kaufungen Forest/Söhre
- Karlsberg (526.2 m), city of Kassel, Habichtswald Uplands
- Kuhbett (525.6 m), Limburg-Weilburg, Taunus
- Ohrberg (525.4 m), Waldeck-Frankenberg, Kellerwald
- Dreienberg (525 m), Hersfeld-Rotenburg, Kuppenrhön, Rhön
- Rückersberg (525 m), county of Fulda, Kuppenrhön, Rhön
- Stoppelsberg (524 m), Hersfeld-Rotenburg, Kuppenrhön, Rhön
- Isthaberg (523.1 m), county of Kassel, Habichtswald Uplands
- Kleinberg (522 m), county of Fulda, Kuppenrhön, Rhön
- Obere Waldspitze (521 m), border Hesse/Bavarian, Spessart
- Schwarzer Berg (521 m), Main-Kinzig-Kreis, Spessart
- Hesselberg (518 m), Wetteraukreis, Taunus
- Homberg (518.5 m), Waldeck-Frankenberg, Kellerwald
- Steinkopf (518.0 m), Hochtaunuskreis, Taunus
- Wieselsberg (518 m), county of Fulda, Kuppenrhön, Rhön
- Melibokus (Malschen) (517 m), Kreis Bergstraße, Odenwald
- Morsberg (517 m), Odenwaldkreis, Odenwald
- Markberg (516 m), Main-Kinzig-Kreis, Spessart
- Roßkopf (516 m), Hessian-Bavarian border, Spessart
- Rossert (515.9 m), Main-Taunus-Kreis, Taunus
- Großer Goldberg (515 m), Hessian-Bavarian border, Spessart
- Rabenkuppe (514.8 m), Werra-Meißner-Kreis, Ringgau
- Felsberg (514 m), Kreis Bergstraße, Odenwald
- Boyneburg (513.0 m), Werra-Meißner-Kreis, Ringgau
- Saukopf (511.4 m), county of Kassel, Habichtswald Uplands
- Landecker Berg (511 m), Hersfeld-Rotenburg, Kuppenrhön, Rhön
- Helfenstein/e (509.8 m), county of Kassel, Habichtswald Uplands
- Huttener Berg (508 m), Main-Kinzig-Kreis, Landrücken
- Atzelberg (506.7 m), Main-Taunus-Kreis, Taunus
- Peterskopf (506.6 m), Waldeck-Frankenberg, Kellerwald
- Hirschberg (Knüll) (506 m), Hersfeld-Rotenburg, Knüll
- Glasebach (505.8 m), Schwalm-Eder-Kreis, Osthessisches Bergland
- Exberg (505 m), Werra-Meißner-Kreis, Kaufungen Forest
- Hundskopf (Taunus) (503.8 m), Rheingau-Taunus-Kreis, Taunus
- Finstere Höhe (503.2 m), Schwalm-Eder-Kreis, Günsteröder Höhe, Melsung Uplands
- Hellberg (502 m), Vogelsbergkreis, Vogelsberg
- Hirzstein (502.0 m), city of Kassel, Habichtswald Uplands
- Katzenstirn (501 m), Schwalm-Eder-Kreis, Stölzinger Hills
- Schickeberg (500 m), Werra-Meißner-Kreis, Ringgau
- Burgberg (Schauenburg) (499.9 m), county of Kassel, Habichtswald Uplands
- Großer Belgerkopf (499.9 m), county of Kassel, Kaufungen Forest/Söhre
- Beilstein (499.5 m), Main-Kinzig-Kreis, Spessart
- Großer Lindenkopf (498.7 m), Hochtaunuskreis, Taunus
- Dünsberg (497.7 m), county of Gießen, near Biebertal-Fellingshausen and Königsberg
- Rimberg (497.1 m), Marburg-Biedenkopf, Lahn-Dill Uplands
- Hübelsberg (497 m), county of Fulda, Kuppenrhön, Rhön
- Stellberg (495 m), county of Kassel, Söhre
- Almusküppel (494.5 m), county of Fulda, Landrücken
- Salmsbachskopf (493.2 m), Schwalm-Eder-Kreis, Melsung Uplands
- Weidelsberg (492.3 m), county of Kassel, Habichtswald Uplands, Langer Wald
- Buchswaldkopf (492 m), Rheingau-Taunuskreis, Taunus
- Goldgrube (492.0 m), Hochtaunuskreis, Taunus
- Nöll (492 m), Schwalm-Eder-Kreis, Knüll Hills
- Kleiner Belgerkopf (490 m), county of Kassel, Kaufungen Forest
- Schieferstein (488.2 m), Werra-Meißner-Kreis, Ringgau
- Lindenberg (485.9 m), county of Kassel, Habichtswald Uplands
- Hausberg (485.7 m), Wetteraukreis, Taunus
- Rippberg (485 m), county of Fulda, Rhön
- Michelskopf (485 m), county of Kassel, Kaufungen Forest/Söhre
- Winterstein (482.3 m), Hochtaunuskreis, Taunus
- Buchberg (482 m), county of Kassel, Kaufungen Forest
- Maisel (482.2 m), Hochtaunuskreis, Taunus
- Kleiner Dörnberg (481.6 m), county of Kassel, Habichtswald Uplands
- Toter Mann (480.3 m), Hersfeld-Rotenburg, Seulingswald
- Trieschkopf (480.1 m), county of Kassel, Söhre
- Bleibeskopf (480 m), Hochtaunuskreis, Taunus
- Burghasunger Berg (479.7 m), county of Kassel, Habichtswald Uplands
- Herzberg (478 m), Hersfeld-Rotenburg, Richelsdorf Hills
- Hundsrück (477.5 m), Werra-Meißner-Kreis, Schlierbachswald
- Hohlestein (476.6 m), county of Kassel, Habichtswald Uplands
- Niedensteiner Kopf (475.0 m), Schwalm-Eder-Kreis, Habichtswald Uplands
- Stirn (475 m), Waldeck-Frankenberg, Langer Wald
- Mengshäuser Kuppe (473 m), Hersfeld-Rotenburg, Fulda-Haune Tableland
- Staufenberg (472.2 m), county of Kassel, Reinhardswald
- Gahrenberg (472.1 m), county of Kassel, Reinhardswald
- Bechtelsberg (472 m), Schwalm-Eder-Kreis/Vogelsbergkreis,
- Tanzplatz (472 m), Waldeck-Frankenberg, Langer Wald
- Gickelsburg (470.9 m), Hochtaunuskreis, Taunus
- Hundskopf (Hemberg) (470.6 m), Schwalm-Eder-Kreis, Kellerwald/Oberhessische Schwelle
- Essigberg (Elmshagen) (Langenberge; ca. 470 m), county of Kassel/Schwalm-Eder-Kreis, Habichtswald Uplands
- Heitzelberg (467 m), Waldeck-Frankenberg, Langer Wald
- Mühlberg (467 m), Hersfeld-Rotenburg, Richelsdorf Hills
- Wildsberg (466.9 m), Schwalm-Eder-Kreis, Melsung Uplands
- Morsberg (466 m), county of Fulda, Kuppenrhön, Rhön
- Struth (466 m), Hersfeld-Rotenburg, Stölzinger Hills
- Lichtberg (465 m), county of Fulda, Kuppenrhön, Rhön
- Hohlstein (463 m), Hersfeld-Rotenburg, Richelsdorf Hills
- Butznickel (462.2 m), Hochtaunuskreis, Taunus
- Spitzhütte (462 m), Hersfeld-Rotenburg, Richelsdorf Hills
- Suterkopf (461.8 m), Limburg-Weilburg, Taunus
- Hahneberg (460.8 m), county of Kassel, Reinhardswald
- Sommerberg (460.8 m), Limburg-Weilburg, Taunus
- Koberg (460.5 m), Limburg-Weilburg, Taunus
- Bilstein (Langenberge) (460 m; hillfort), Schwalm-Eder-Kreis, Habichtswald Uplands
- Schönauer Küppel (459.0 m), Rheingau-Taunus-Kreis, Taunus
- Ölberg (457.8 m), county of Kassel, Söhre
- Schorn (456.8 m), county of Kassel, Söhre
- Rotestock (456 m), Hersfeld-Rotenburg, Richelsdorf Hills
- Schwalbenkopf (454.7 m), Hersfeld-Rotenburg, Seulingswald
- Schläferskopf (454.2 m), Wiesbaden, Taunus
- Junkernkopf (453 m), county of Kassel, Reinhardswald
- Escheberg (Landrücken) (452.3 m), Main-Kinzig-Kreis, Landrücken
- Hahnskopf (452 m), county of Kassel, Habichtswald Uplands
- Schlossberg (452 m), Werra-Meißner-Kreis, Ringgau
- Siebertsberg (449.1 m), Hersfeld-Rotenburg, Seulingswald
- Sengelsberg (449.0 m), Schwalm-Eder-Kreis, Habichtswald Uplands
- Escheberg (Malsburger Wald) (448.9 m), county of Kassel, Malsburger Wald
- Haukuppe (448 m), Hersfeld-Rotenburg, Knüll Hills
- Ziegenküppel (445.4 m), Werra-Meißner-Kreis, Stölzinger Hills
- Hornungskuppe (444 m), Hersfeld-Rotenburg, Seulingswald
- Knebelsrod (443.1 m), Waldeck-Frankenberg, Burgwald
- Badenstein (441.5 m), border county of Kassel & Schwalm-Eder-Kreis, Söhre
- Petershöhe (441 m), Schwalm-Eder-Kreis/Werra-Meißner-Kreis, Stölzinger Hills
- Erbelberg (440.0 m), Werra-Meißner-Kreis, Ringgau
- Burgberg (Baunatal) (439.6 m; hillfort), county of Kassel, Habichtswald Uplands
- Rabenstein (439.3 m), Waldeck-Frankenberg, Kellerwald
- Warpel (439.4 m), county of Kassel, Söhre
- Heiligenberg (439.0 m), Schwalm-Eder-Kreis, Melsung Uplands
- Ringelberg (436.4 m), Werra-Meißner-Kreis, Ringgau
- Iberg (434.0 m), Werra-Meißner-Kreis, Ringgau
- Brasselsberg (434.2 m), city of Kassel, Habichtswald Uplands
- Roteberg (434 m), Hersfeld-Rotenburg, Seulingswald
- Kalte Hainbuche (432.6 m), Schwalm-Eder-Kreis, Gilserbergen Heights
- Eisenberg (Dalwigksthal) (432.4 m), Waldeck-Frankenberg, Breite Struth
- Keseberg (431.2 m), Waldeck-Frankenberg, Kellerwald
- Langenberg (Reinhardswald) (430 m), county of Kassel, Reinhardswald
- Bromsberg (427.2 m), Schwalm-Eder-Kreis, Osthessisches Bergland
- Großer Staufenberg (427 m), county of Göttingen, Kaufungen Forest
- Kohlhau (425 m), Limburg-Weilburg, Westerwald
- Todtenhöhe (424 m), Waldeck-Frankenberg, Burgwald
- Hoher Buhlkopf (423 m), Schwalm-Eder-Kreis, Stölzinger Hills
- Flötschkopf (421 m), Wartburgkreis, Richelsdorf Hills
- Heukopf (421 m), Waldeck-Frankenberg, Burgwald
- Hangarstein (418.5 m), county of Kassel, Habichtswald Uplands
- Hühnerfeldberg (418.4 m), county of Göttingen, Kaufungen Forest
- ) (418 m), Hersfeld-Rotenburg, Stölzinger Hills
- Alter Turm (418 m), Hersfeld-Rotenburg, Stölzinger Hills
- Gernkopf (417 m), Hersfeld-Rotenburg, Knüll Hills
- Hammelsberg (415.6 m) Main-Kinzig-Kreis, Büdinger Wald
- Mäuseberg (415 m), Werra-Meißner-Kreis,
- Rammelsberg (415 m), county of, Stölzinger Hills
- Baunsberg (413.4 m), county of Kassel, Habichtswald Uplands
- Wasserberg (412 m), Waldeck-Frankenberg, Burgwald
- Ratzbusch (409 m), Hersfeld-Rotenburg, Richelsdorf Hills
- Störner (408 m), Hesse
- Tauschenberg (406.8 m), Marburg-Biedenkopf, Burgwald
- Ziegenküppel (Stolzhäuser Rücken) (405.8 m), Werra-Meißner-Kreis, Stolzhäuser Rücken, Stölzinger Hills
- Uhrenkopf (405 m), Waldeck-Frankenberg, Kellerwald
- Auerhansberg (403 m), Hersfeld-Rotenburg, Richelsdorf Hills
- Hesselkopf (403 m), Hersfeld-Rotenburg, Richelsdorf Hills
- Plessenberg (402 m), Hersfeld-Rotenburg, Seulingswald
- Stoppelberg (401.2 m), Lahn-Dill-Kreis, Taunus
- Schönelsberger Kopf (401 m), Waldeck-Frankenberg, Burgwald
- Pinnköppel (399.6 m), Hochtaunuskreis, Taunus
- Gerhardsberg (399 m), Marburg-Biedenkopf, Burgwald
- Hegeküppel (399 m), Hersfeld-Rotenburg, Richelsdorf Hills
- Heidenhäuschen (398 m), Limburg-Weilburg, Westerwald
- Dornburg (396 m), Limburg-Weilburg, Westerwald
- Eichkopf (Wernborn) (394.8 m), Hochtaunuskreis, Taunus
- Ahlberg (394.6 m), county of Kassel, Reinhardswald
- Heiligenberg (Felsberg) (393 m), Schwalm-Eder-Kreis, near Felsberg
- Heuberg (Hofgeismarer Stadtwald) (392.0 m), county of Kassel, Hofgeismarer Stadtwald
- Hohehardt (391 m), Marburg-Biedenkopf, Burgwald
- Schiefergrundskopf (388.6 m), Werra-Meißner-Kreis, Schlierbachswald
- Christenberg (387 m), Marburg-Biedenkopf, Burgwald
- Finsterkopf (386 m), Waldeck-Frankenberg, Burgwald
- Sattelkopf (384 m), Marburg-Biedenkopf, Burgwald
- Odenberg (381 m), Schwalm-Eder-Kreis, Gudensberger Kuppenschwelle
- Heiligenberg (Naumburg) (380.0 m), county of Kassel, Habichtswald Uplands
- Ortenberg (379.4 m), Marburg-Biedenkopf, Lahnberge
- Rödeser Berg (379.0 m), county of Kassel, Habichtswald Uplands
- Brodberg (376 m), Hersfeld-Rotenburg, Richelsdorf Hills
- Hoheberg (Züschen) (375.7 m), Schwalm-Eder-Kreis, Elberbergen Heights
- Hoher Rain (375.7 m), Werra-Meißner-Kreis, Schlierbachswald
- Großer Steinkopf (375 m), Hersfeld-Rotenburg, Seulingswald
- Hünerberg (375.0 m), Hochtaunuskreis, Taunus
- Igelsbett (373.8 m), county of Kassel, Habichtswald Uplands
- Hagenstein (373.3 m), Waldeck-Frankenberg, Kellerwald
- Ofenberg (372 m), county of Kassel, Habichtswald Uplands
- Vogelheerd (369.8 m), Marburg-Biedenkopf, Marburger Rücken
- Hühnerküppel (369.3 m), Limburg-Weilburg, Taunus
- Otzberg (367 m), county of Darmstadt-Dieburg, Odenwald
- Rauenstein (366.4 m), county of Kassel, Habichtswald Uplands
- Reichenberg (366 m), Hersfeld-Rotenburg, Richelsdorf Hills
- Hardtkopf (363.8 m), county of Kassel, Ostwaldecker Randsenken
- Amöneburg (363 m), Marburg-Biedenkopf, Amöneburg Basin
- Kammerberg (360.8 m), Schwalm-Eder-Kreis, Habichtswald Uplands
- Großer Hirschberg (358 m), Marburg-Biedenkopf, Burgwald
- Hauptkopf (357 m), Marburg-Biedenkopf, Burgwald
- Steinkopf near Hilwartshausen (353.2), county of Kassel, Reinhardswald
- Quillerkopf (Quiller; ca. 345 m), Schwalm-Eder-Kreis, near Körle
- Stöckeberg (344.8 m), county of Kassel, Waldeck Forest, Langer Wald
- Gellenberg (340 m), Hersfeld-Rotenburg, Seulingswald
- Söhler (338 m), Marburg-Biedenkopf, Burgwald
- Hundsburg (334.9 m), Schwalm-Eder-Kreis, Kellerwald
- Hoheberg (Reptich) (333.2 m), Schwalm-Eder-Kreis, Gilserbergen Heights
- Großer Wachenkopf (333.1 m), Schwalm-Eder-Kreis, Habichtswald Uplands
- Kleiner Wachenkopf (327 m), Schwalm-Eder-Kreis, Habichtswald Uplands
- Johanneskirchenkopf (332 m), Schwalm-Eder-Kreis, Alter Wald
- Kainsberg (324 m), Waldeck-Frankenberg, Burgwald
- Lamsberg (322 m), Schwalm-Eder-Kreis, Gudensberger Kuppenschwelle
- Ziegenrück (318.2 m), county of Kassel, Habichtswald Uplands
- Graner Berg (315.0 m), county of Kassel, Wolfhager Hügelland
- Firnskuppe (313.9 m), city of Kassel, Habichtswald Uplands
- Mensfelder Kopf (313.7 m), Limburg-Weilburg, Taunus
- Kopfsteine (310 m), county of Kassel, Habichtswald Uplands
- Nenkel (307.1 m), Schwalm-Eder-Kreis, Gudensberger Kuppenschwelle
- Breuberg (306 m), Odenwaldkreis, Odenwald
- Wartberg (306.0 m), Schwalm-Eder-Kreis, Fritzlar Börde
- Schloßberg (305.8 m), Schwalm-Eder-Kreis, Gudensberger Kuppenschwelle
- Scharfenstein (304 m), Schwalm-Eder-Kreis, Gudensberger Kuppenschwelle
- Junkerskopf (284.2 m), Schwalm-Eder-Kreis, Habichtswald Uplands
- Holzberg (280 m), Hochtaunuskreis, Taunus
- Schützeberg (277.2 m), county of Kassel, Habichtswald Uplands
- Büraberg (275 m), Schwalm-Eder-Kreis, Hessewald
- Steinkopf near Wülmersen (271.1), county of Kassel, Reinhardswald
- Mader Stein (265 m), Schwalm-Eder-Kreis, Gudensberger Kuppenschwelle
- Hahn (255.8 m), Schwalm-Eder-Kreis, Kassel Basin
- Eckerich (254 m), Schwalm-Eder-Kreis, Elberbergen Heights
- Steinkopf in the Fulda Valley (250), county of Kassel, Reinhardswald
- Neroberg (245.0 m), Wiesbaden, Taunus
- Mainzer Berg (227 m), Dieburg
- Moosberg (185.0), county of Kassel, Reinhardswald
- Oberwaldberg (145 m), Hesse

== See also ==
- List of the mountain and hill ranges in Germany
- List of the highest mountains of Germany
- List of the highest mountains of the German states
