= Steinwand =

Steinwand may refer to:

- Steinwand (Rhön), a mountain of Hesse, Germany

== People with the surname ==
- Rudolf Steinwand (1906–1982), German politician
