= Arennest =

Hill in Hesse, Germany

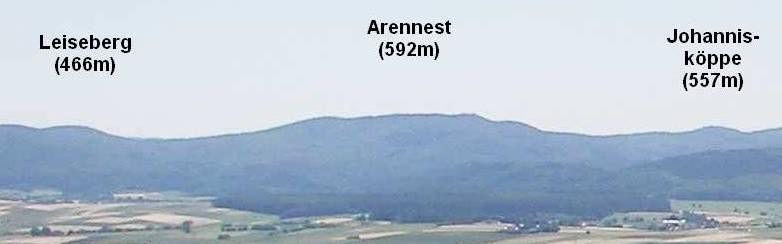

Highest point
- Elevation: 591.5 m (1,941 ft)
- Listing: Mountains and hills of Hesse
- Coordinates: 50°55′N 8°35′E

Geography
- Location within Hesse
- Location: Hesse, Germany

Arennest is a hill in Hesse, Germany. It is located nearby Biedenkopf and is covered with forest. It is also a known point of interest for hikers and is featured in regional hiking routes.

== Hiking ==
Arennest is part of several regional hiking routes and is known for its forested trails and scenic views. It is featured as a recommended trail destination by local hiking platforms.
