= Burghasunger Berg =

Hill in Hesse, Germany

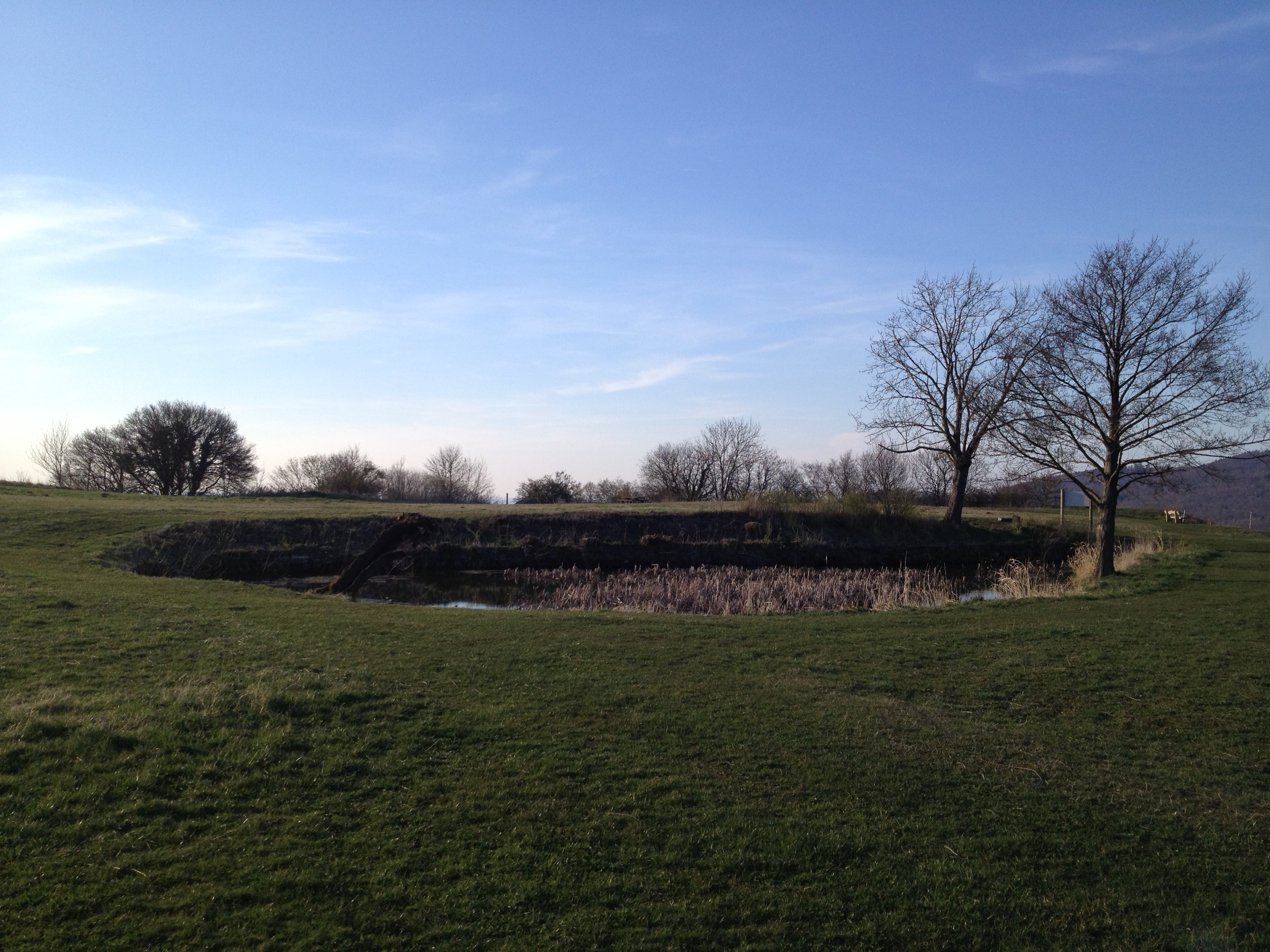
- Burghasunger Berg

Highest point
- Elevation: 479.7 m (1,574 ft)
- Listing: Mountains and hills of Hesse
- Coordinates: 51°19′22″N 9°16′25″E

Geography
- Location within Hesse
- Location: Hesse, Germany

The Burghasunger Berg is a hill in Hesse, Germany.
