= Eckerich (Fritzlar) =

Coordinates: 51°08′N 9°15′E

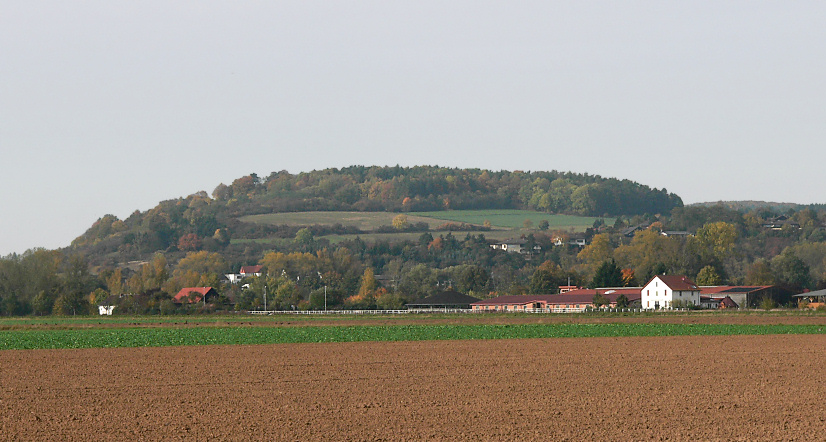
- View of Eckerich mountain

Highest point
- Elevation: 254 m (833 ft)

Geography
- Location: Schwalm-Eder-Kreis, Hesse, Germany

The Eckerich is a hill in the county of Schwalm-Eder-Kreis, Hesse, Germany. Located on top of the hill is the Eckerichswarte watchtower.
