= Igelsbett =

- Location within Hesse

Highest point
- Elevation: 373.8 m (1,226 ft)
- Coordinates: 51°26′10″N 9°15′21″E

Geography
- Location: Hesse, Germany

Igelsbett is a hill of Hesse, Germany.
