= Junkernkopf =

Hill in Hesse, Germany

Coordinates: 51°27′N 9°32′E

Highest point
- Elevation: 453 m (1,486 ft)

Geography
- Location: Hesse, Germany

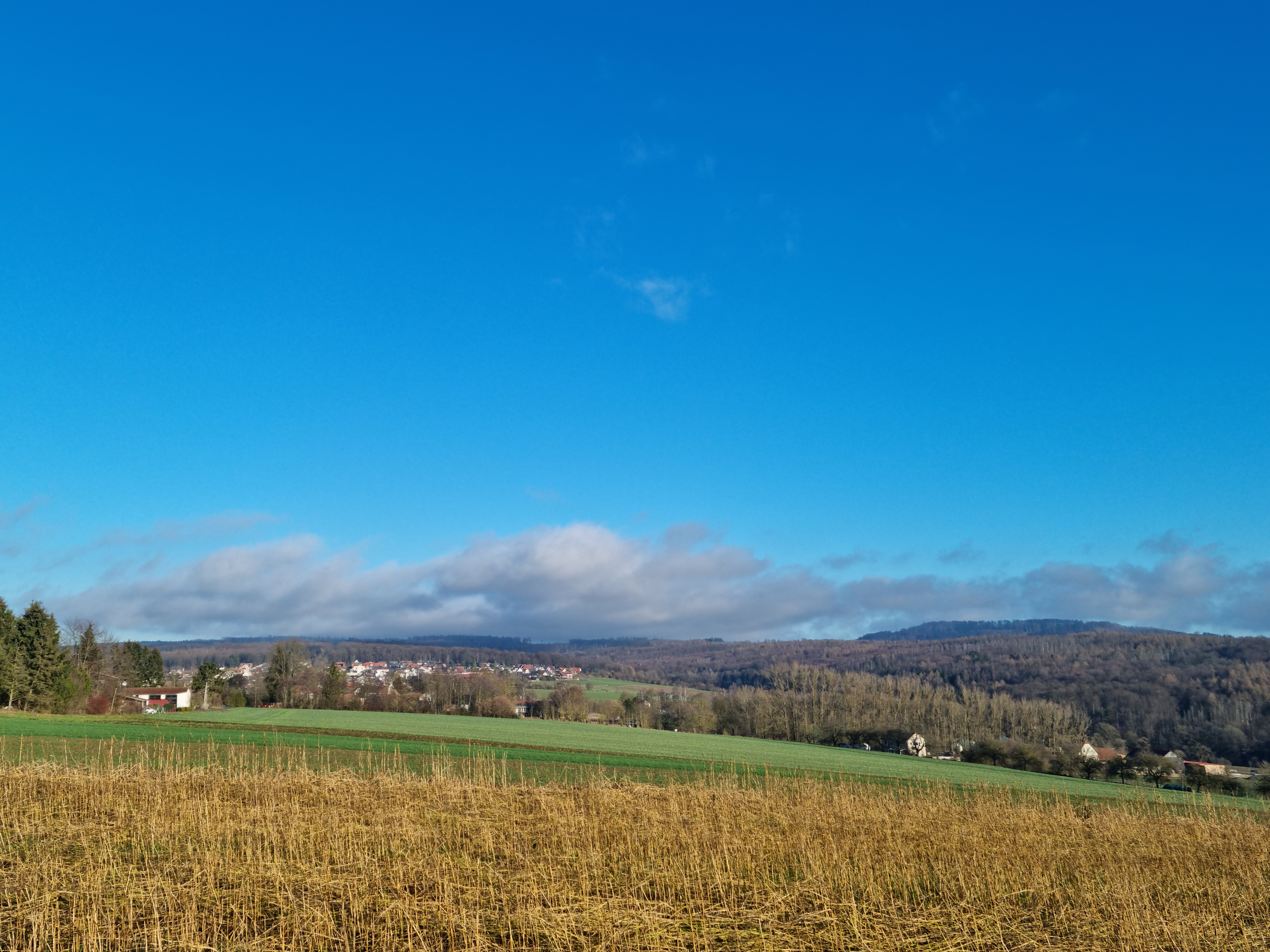
A view of Junkernkopf (background left) from the village of Holzhausen

Junkernkopf is a hill of Hesse, Germany.
