= Großer Bärenberg =

Hill in Hesse, Germany

Coordinates: 51°21′N 9°16′E

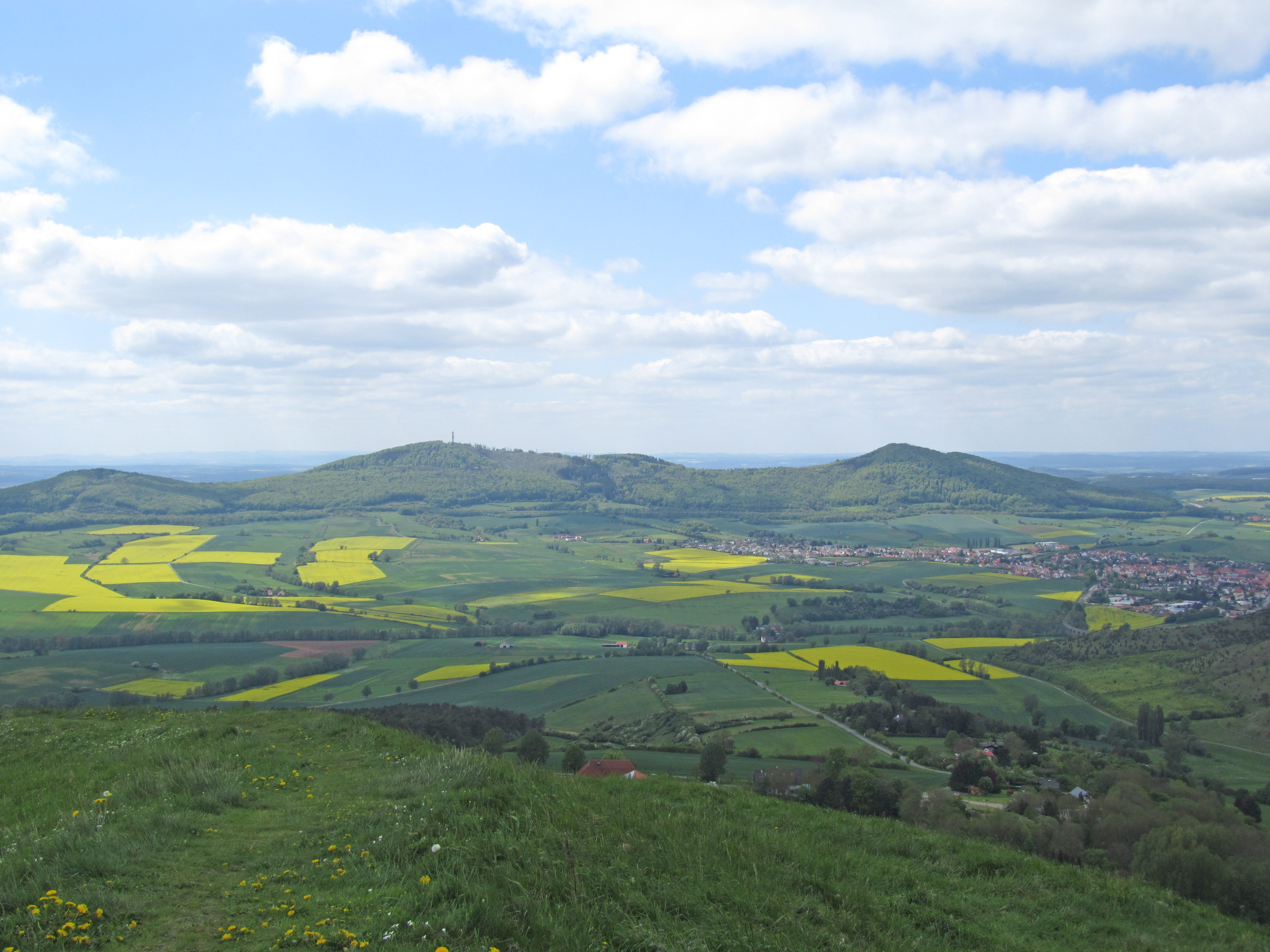
- View of Großer Bärenberg (with the tower) from Hoher Dörnberg to the West

Highest point
- Elevation: 600.7 m (1,971 ft)

Geography
- Location: Hesse, Germany

The Großer Bärenberg is high hill in Hesse, Germany.
