= Ofenberg (Wolfhagen) =

Mountain in Germany

Coordinates: 51°19′39″N 09°11′24″E

Highest point
- Elevation: 372.5 m (1,222 ft)

Geography
- Location: Hesse, Germany

Ofenberg is a mountain of Hesse, Germany.
