= Moosberg (Reinhardswald) =

Mountain in Hesse, Germany

Coordinates: 51°35′46″N 9°26′40″E

Highest point
- Elevation: 185 m (607 ft)

Geography
- Location: Hesse, Germany

Moosberg is a low hill in Hesse, Germany.
