= Spessartskopf =

Mountain in Germany

Coordinates: 49°37′N 8°53′E

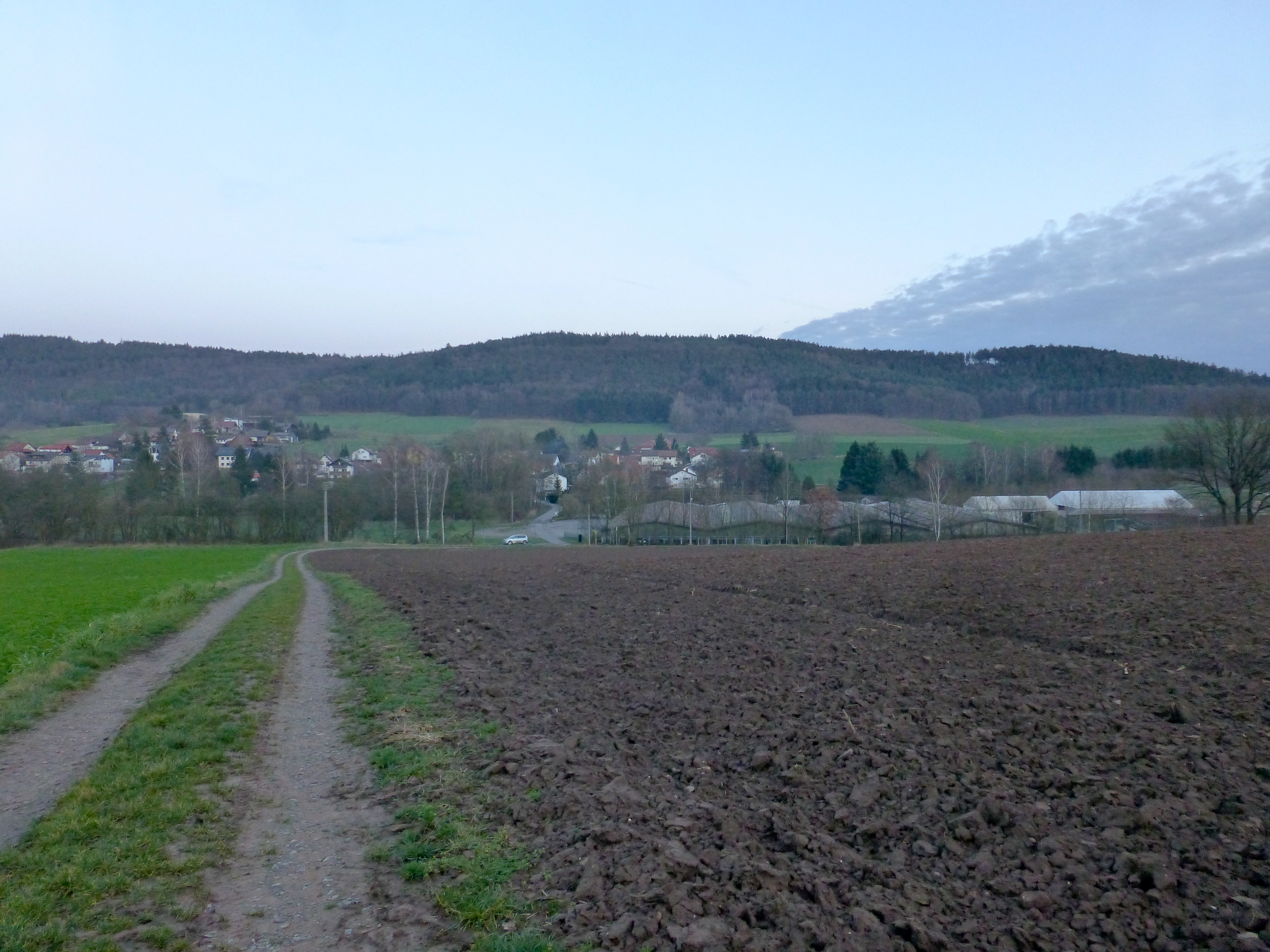
- View from an agricultural road southwest of Wahlen eastwards to the Spessartskopf: Südkuppe (middle), Nordkuppe (left edge of the picture); parts of the village of Wahlen in the center of the picture.

Highest point
- Elevation: 547 m (1,795 ft)

Geography
- Location: Hesse, Germany

Spessartskopf is an Odenwald mountain in Hesse, Germany.
