= Mengshäuser Kuppe =

Mountain in Germany

Coordinates: 50°47′N 9°39′E

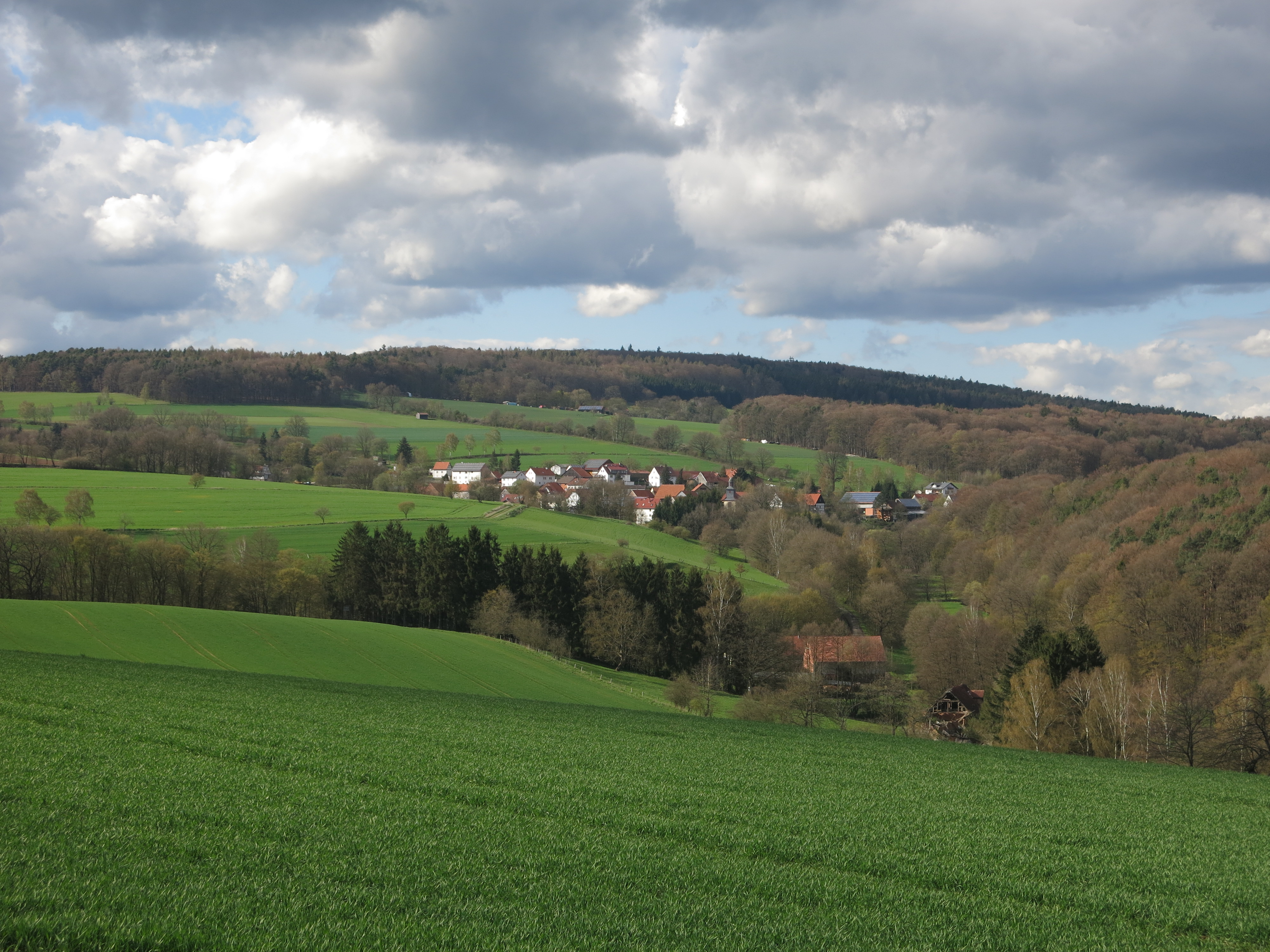
- The village Kruspis and the mountain Mengshäuser Kuppe

Highest point
- Elevation: 473.4 m (1,553 ft)

Geography
- Location: Hesse, Germany

The Mengshäuser Kuppe is a hill in Hesse, Germany.

An old castle "Wallenfels" lies in ruin on the northern side of the hill.
