= Ziegenkopf (Habichtswald) =

Mountain in Germany

Coordinates: 51°18′30″N 9°22′08″E

Highest point
- Elevation: 564.7 m (1,853 ft)

Geography
- Location: Hesse, Germany

The Ziegenkopf is a mountain of Hesse, Germany.
