= Alter Turm (Stölzinger Hills) =

Coordinates: 50°29′N 9°41′E

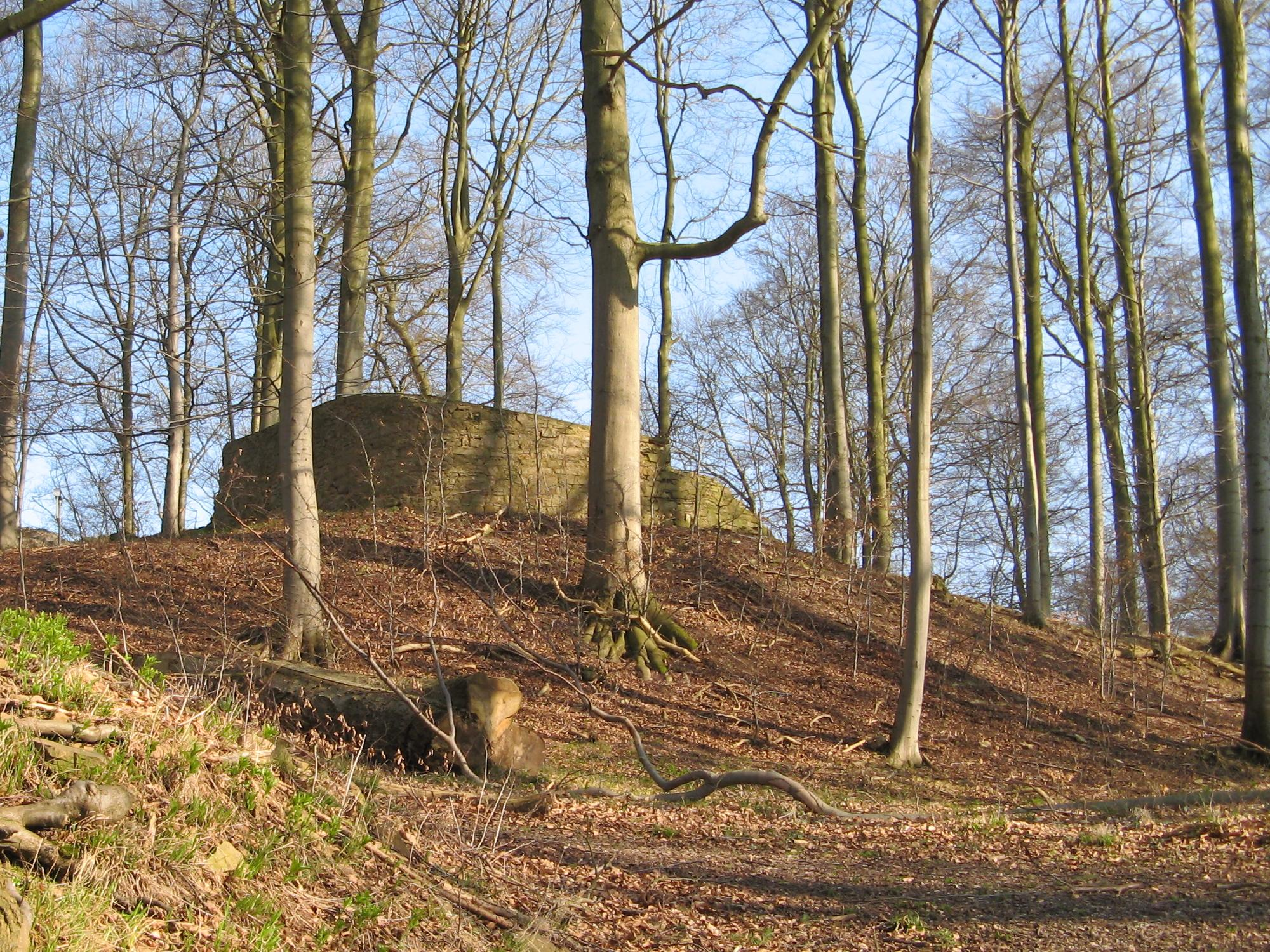
- Ruines of the Rodenberg stronghold on Alter Turm

Highest point
- Elevation: 418.1 m (1,372 ft)

Geography
- Location: Hesse, Germany

The Alter Turm is a hill in Hesse, Germany.
