= Steinkopf (southeast Reinhardswald) =

Mountain in Germany

Coordinates: 51°26′53″N 9°37′01″E

Highest point
- Elevation: 353.2 m (1,159 ft)

Geography
- Location: Hesse, Germany

Steinkopf is a hill of Hesse, Germany.
