= Rahnsberg =

Mountain in Hesse, Germany

Coordinates: 50°55′48″N 8°34′46″E

Highest point
- Elevation: 561 m (1,841 ft)

Geography
- Location: Hesse, Germany

Rahnsberg is a mountain of Hesse, Germany.
