= Nimerich =

Hill in Hesse, Germany

Coordinates: 50°52′N 8°31′E

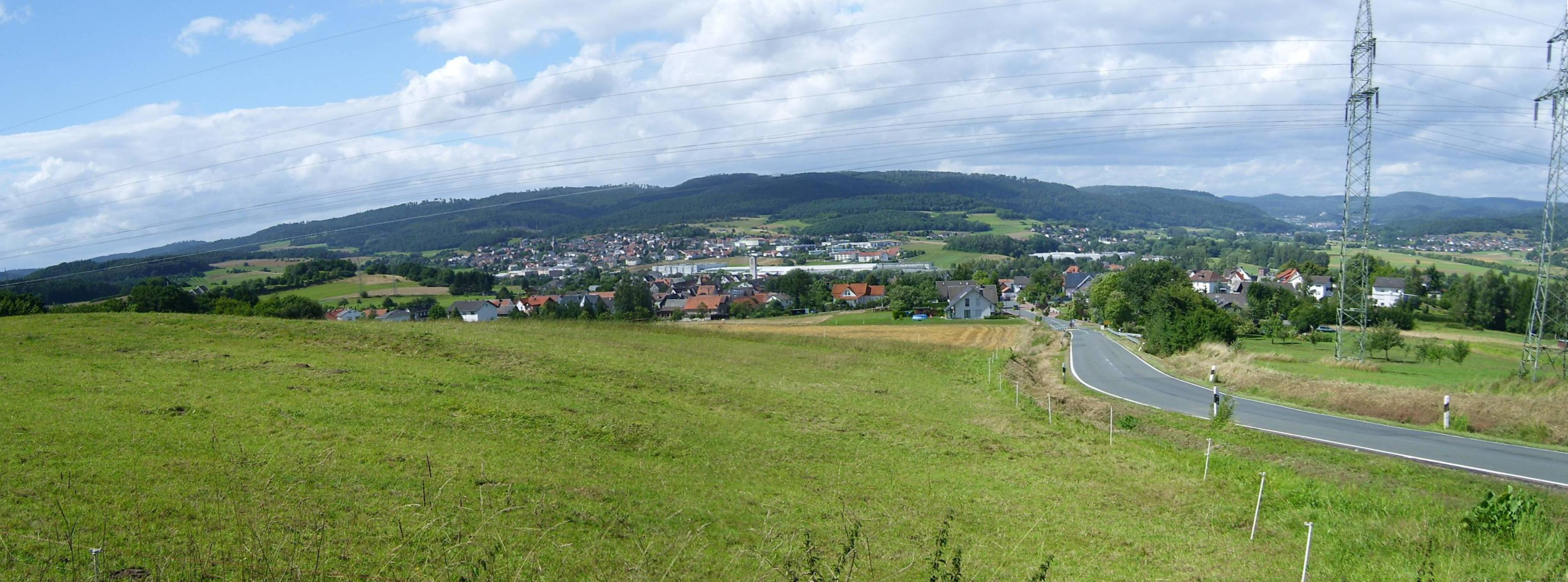
- View of Nimerich

Highest point
- Elevation: 533 m (1,749 ft)

Geography
- Location: Hesse, Germany

Nimerich is a hill of Hesse, Germany.
