= Maulkuppe =

Mountain in Hesse, Germany

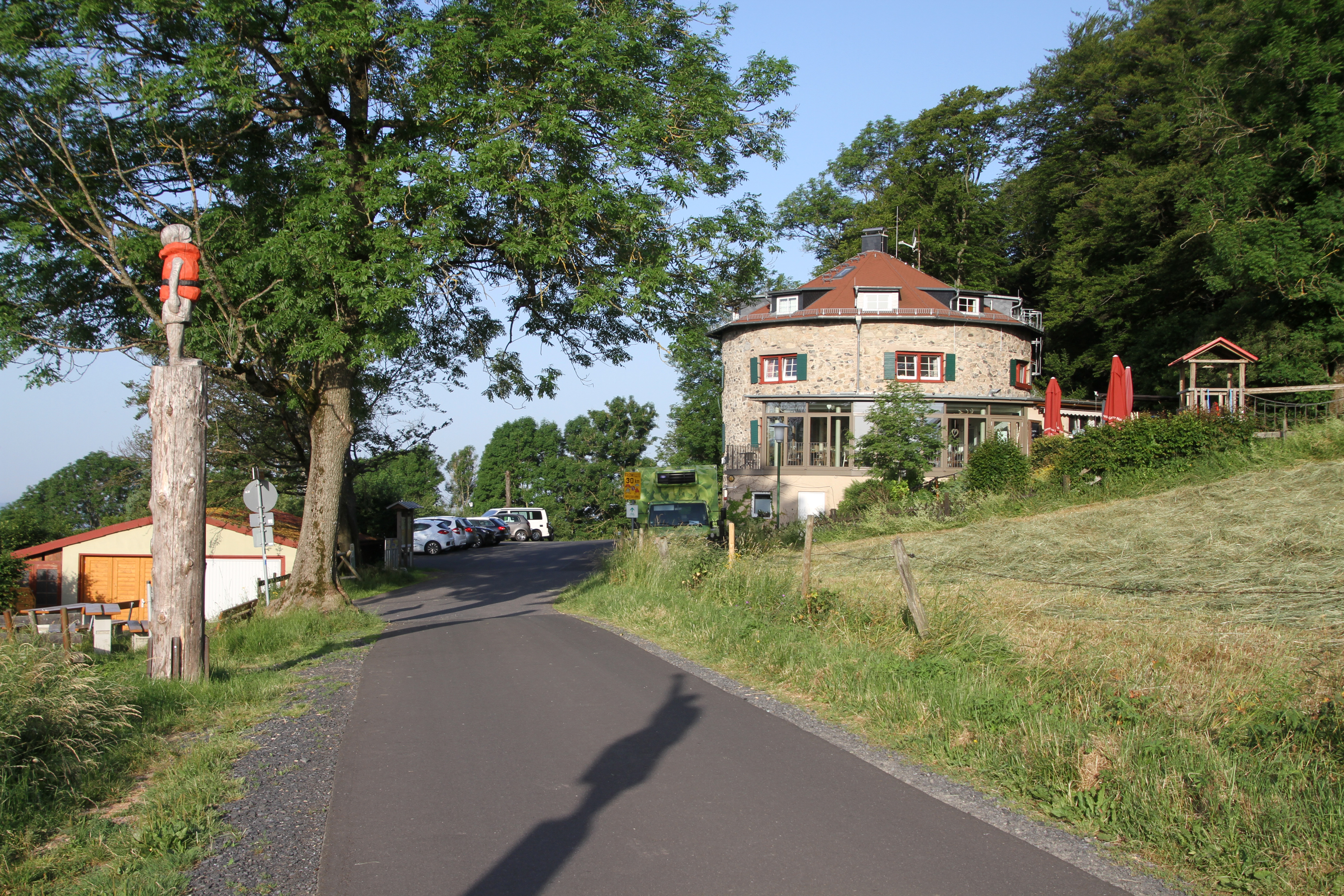
- Fuldaer Haus on Maulkuppe

Highest point
- Elevation: 706 m (2,316 ft)
- Coordinates: 50°31′43″N 9°52′37″E

Geography
- Location within Hesse Location within Germany
- Location: Hesse, Germany

Maulkuppe is a mountain of Hesse, Germany.
