= Kleiner Dörnberg =

Mountain in Germany

Highest point
- Elevation: 482 m (1,581 ft)
- Coordinates: 51°21′55″N 9°19′56″E

Geography
- Location: Hesse, Germany

Kleiner Dörnberg (also known as Zierenberger Kuppe) is a mountain of Hesse, Germany.
