= Weißer Stein (Vogelsberg) =

Mountain ridge in Hesse, Germany

Coordinates: 50°28′05″N 9°17′35″E

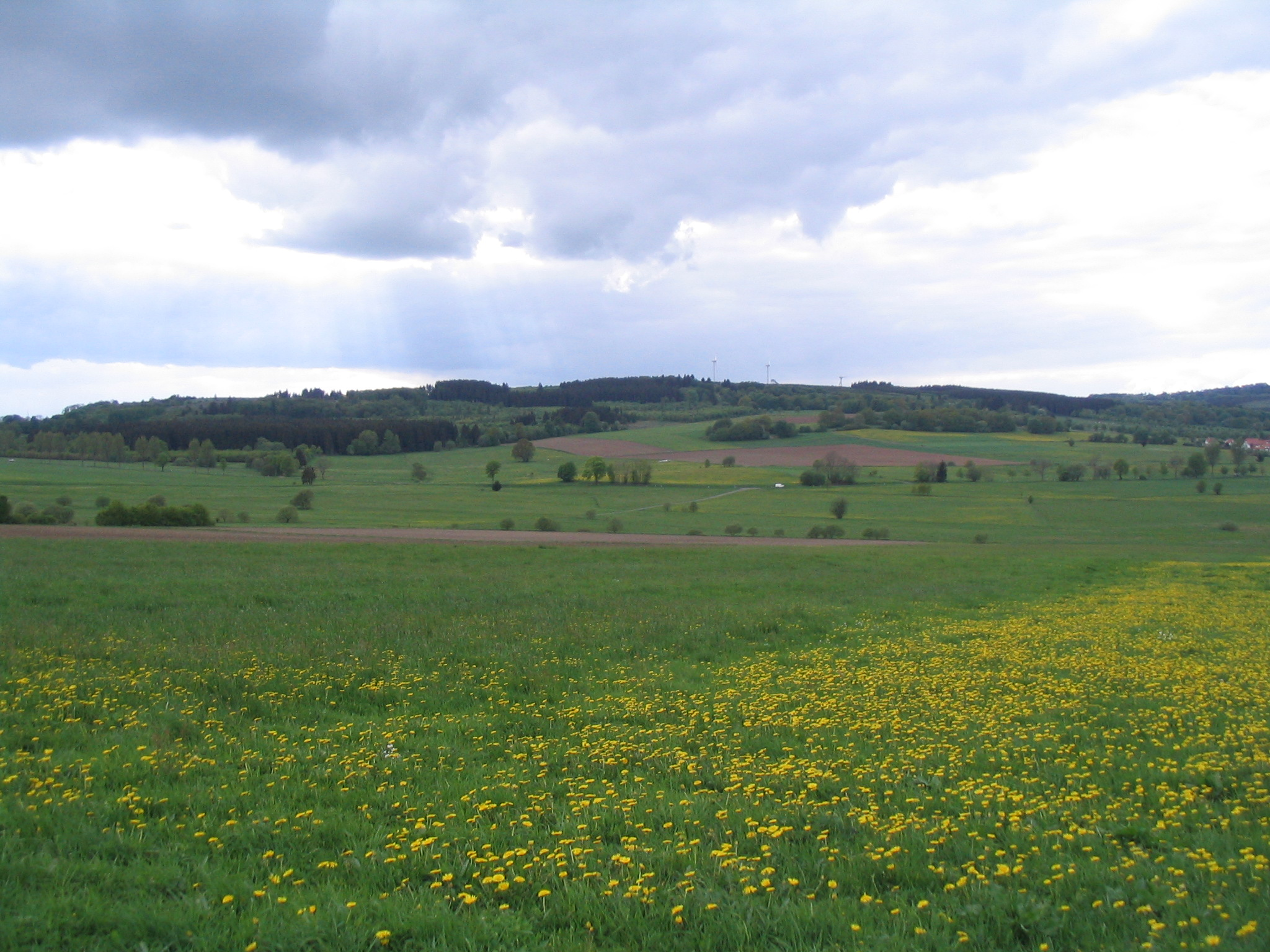
- The Weißer Stein (607 m) near Bermuthshain in Vogelsberg from the east

Highest point
- Elevation: 607 m (1,991 ft)

Geography
- Location: Hesse, Germany

Weißer Stein is a high mountain ridge in the Vogelsberg, a low mountain range in central Hesse, Germany.

== Geography ==
The Weißer Stein lies between Bermuthshain and Hartmannshain, two districts of Grebenhain, 4 km southwest of the core municipality.

The Rhine-Weser watershed runs across the Weißer Stein. The wooded eastern slope drains via the Lüder and Fulda into the Weser.

The Voselberg wind energy park, the oldest German wind farm in the low mountain range and also the oldest wind farm in Hesse, extends from the summit area across the western and southern slopes.

== Tourism ==
The Weißer Stein is accessible via hiking trails and is bordered to the north by the Vulkanradweg and to the west by the Vogelsberg Southern Railway Cycle Route. On the Höllerich, a slightly distinct hill on the eastern slope of the Weißer Stein, is the Bermuthshain ski jump. It was inaugurated in 1970, was in use until the early 1980s, and has been a listed building since 2003. In 2006, the takeoff platform was converted into a viewing platform and made accessible.
