= Dreienberg =

Mountain in Hesse, Germany

Coordinates: 50°52′31″N 9°52′11″E

Highest point
- Elevation: 525 m (1,722 ft)

Geography
- Location: Hesse, Germany

Dreienberg is a mountain of Hesse, Germany.
