= Steinberg (Kaufungen Forest) =

Mountain in Germany

Coordinates: 51°16′26″N 9°46′53″E

Highest point
- Elevation: 585 m (1,919 ft)

Geography
- Location: Hesse, Germany

Steinberg (German pronunciation: [ˈʃtaɪ̯nˌbɛʁk]) is a hill of Hesse, Germany.
