= Flörsbacher Höhe =

Coordinates: 50°08′N 9°26′E

Geography
- Location: Hesse, Germany

The Flörsbacher Höhe is a hill in Hesse, Germany.
