= Firnskuppe =

Coordinates: 51°21′06″N 9°25′29″E

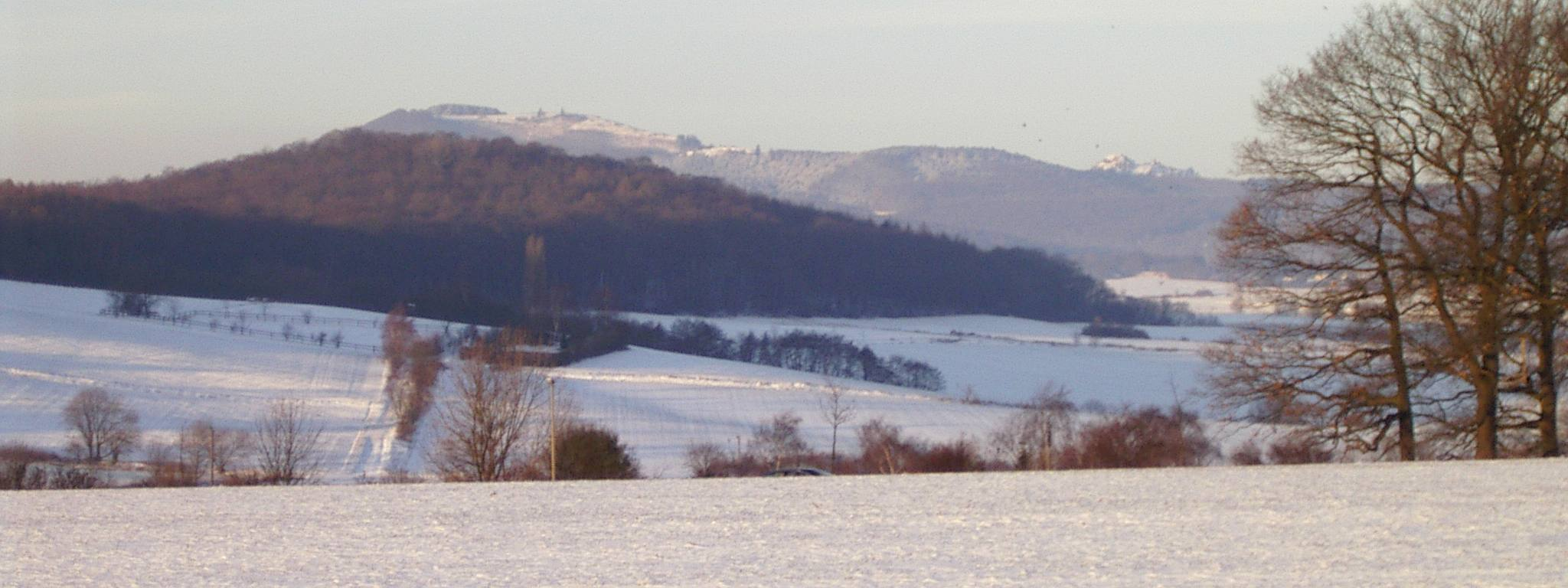

Highest point
- Elevation: 313.9 m (1,030 ft)

Geography
- Location: Hesse, Germany

The Firnskuppe is a hill in Hesse, Germany.
