= Escheberg (hill) =

Hill in Hesse, Germany

Coordinates: 51°24′11″N 9°14′28″E

Highest point
- Elevation: 448.9 m (1,473 ft)

Geography
- Location: Hesse, Germany

Escheberg is a hill of Hesse, Germany.
