= Giebelrain =

Coordinates: 50°30′N 9°49′E

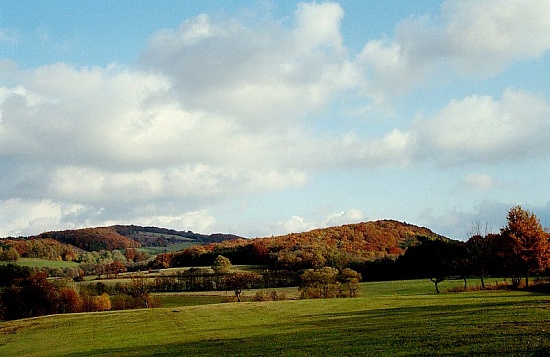

Highest point
- Elevation: 590 m (1,940 ft)

Geography
- Location: Hesse, Germany

The Giebelrain is a hill in Hesse, Germany.
