= Pentersrück =

Mountain in Germany

Coordinates: 51°10′01″N 9°41′21″E

Highest point
- Elevation: 562.1 m (1,844 ft)

Geography
- Location: Schwalm-Eder-Kreis, Hesse, Germany

Pentersrück is a mountain of Schwalm-Eder-Kreis, Hesse, Germany.
