= Elfbuchen =

Hill in Hesse, Germany

Coordinates: 51°19′49″N 9°23′36″E

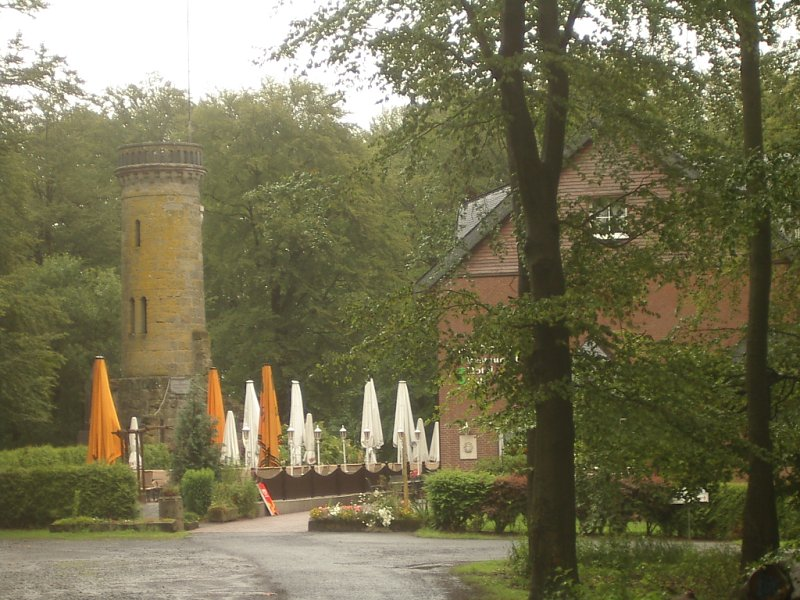

Highest point
- Elevation: 535 m (1,755 ft)

Geography
- Location: Hesse, Germany

The Elfbuchen is a hill in Hesse, Germany.
