= Hohe Pön =

German mountain

Coordinates: 51°16′N 8°38′E

Highest point
- Elevation: 792.7 m (2,601 ft)

Geography
- Location: Landkreis Waldeck-Frankenberg, Hesse, Germany

Hohe Pön viewed from the west

Hohe Pön is a mountain of Landkreis Waldeck-Frankenberg, Hesse, Germany.
