= Steinkopf (northwest Reinhardswald) =

Mountain in Germany

Coordinates: 51°36′15″N 9°28′25″E

Highest point
- Elevation: 271.1 m (889 ft)

Geography
- Location: Hesse, Germany

Steinkopf is a hill of Hesse, Germany.
