= Kaulenberg =

Hill in Hesse, Germany

Coordinates: 51°18′02″N 9°20′41″E

Highest point
- Elevation: 545 m (1,788 ft)

Geography
- Location: Hesse, Germany

Kaulenberg is a hill of Hesse, Germany.
