= Brasselsberg (Habichtswald) =

Mountain in Kassel, Germany

Coordinates: 51°17′24″N 9°24′26″E

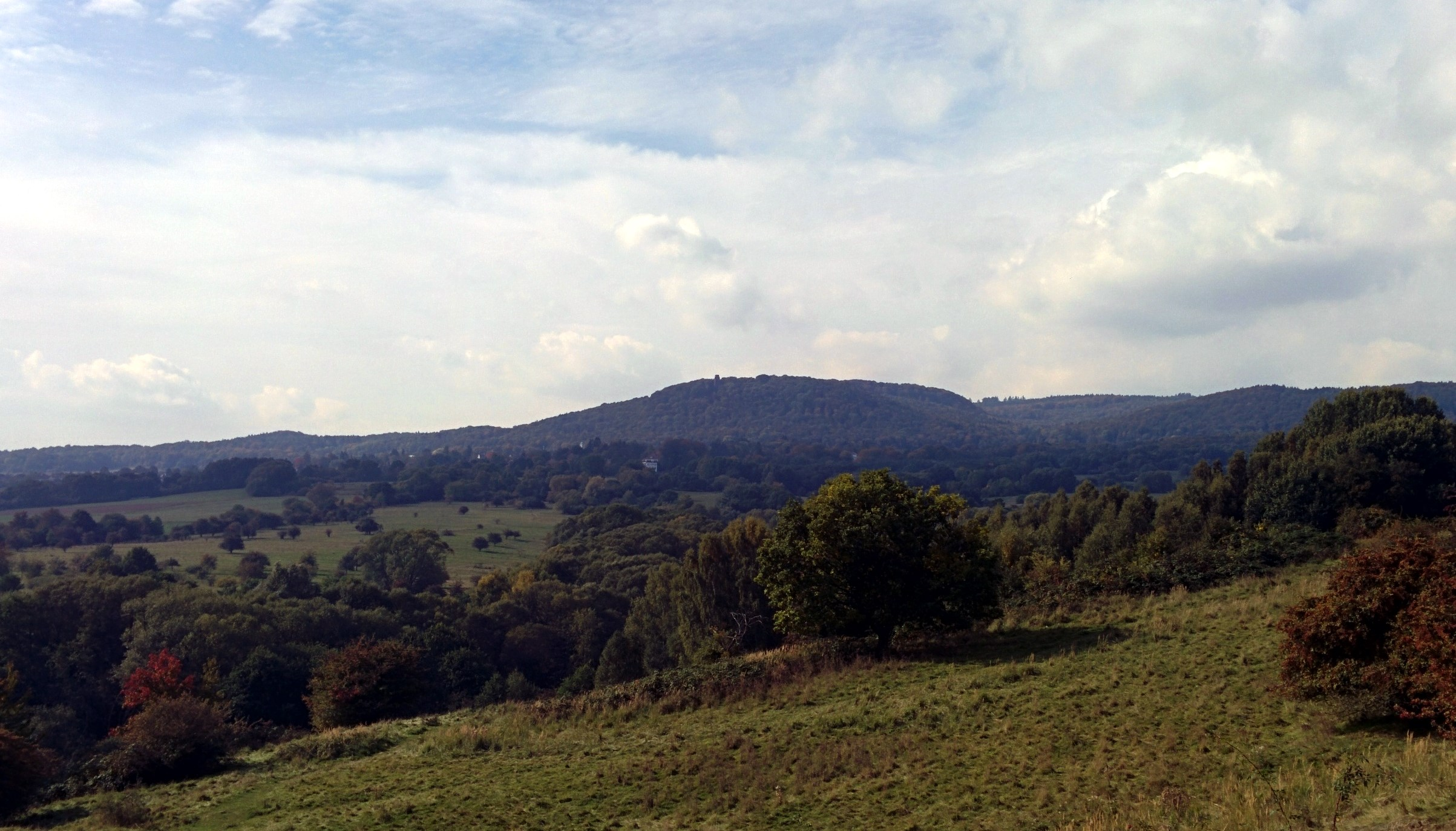
- The Brasselsberg as seen from the Dönche

Highest point
- Elevation: 434.2 m (1,425 ft)

Geography
- Location: Hesse, Germany

The Brasselsberg, located in the Brasselsberg district of Kassel, is a 434.2 m-high wooded spur on the eastern flank of the High Habichtswald in northern Hesse, Germany. It is the site of the Kassel Bismarck Tower.
