= Hangarstein =

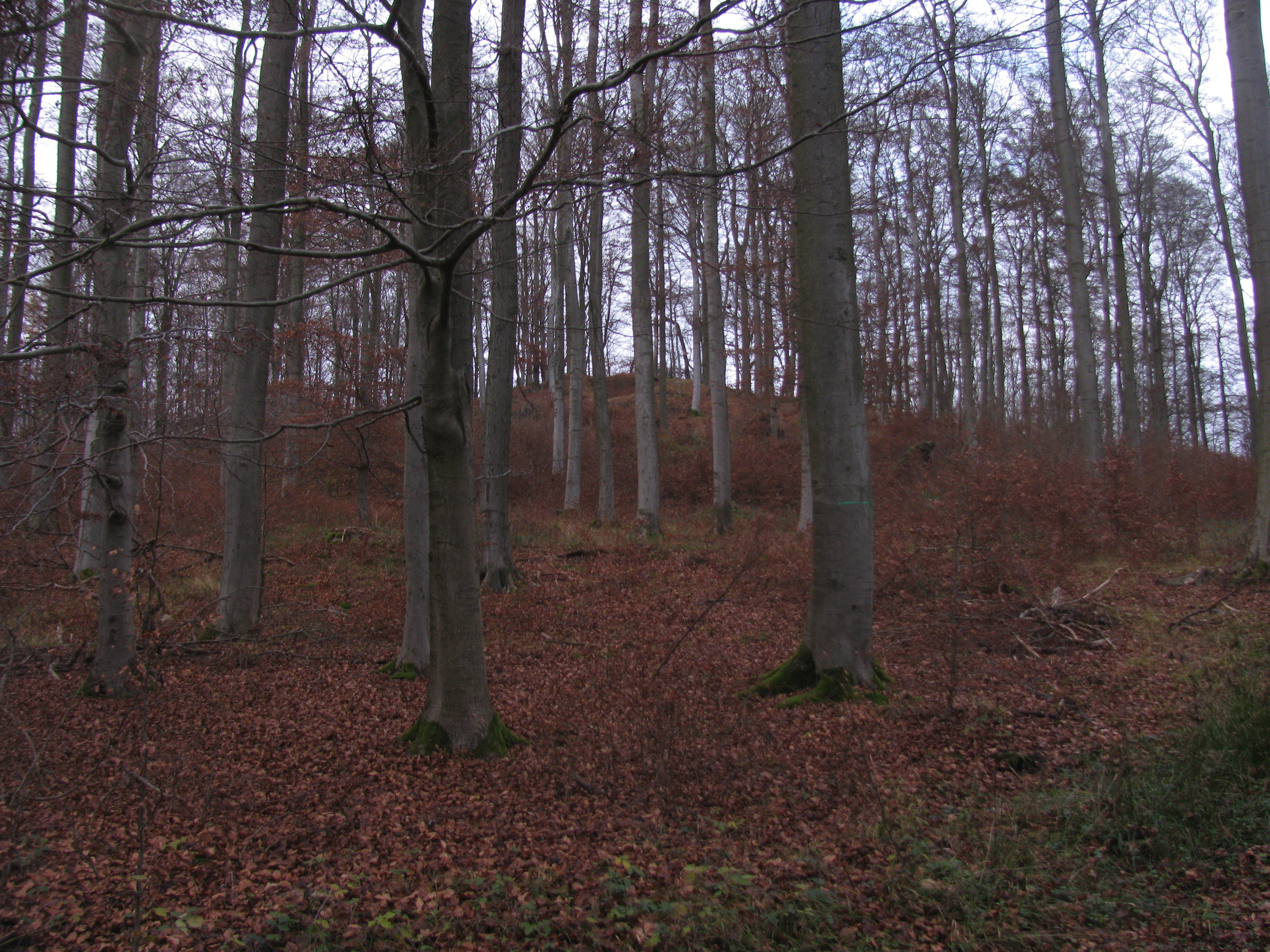
- Hangarstein in Hesse, Germany

Highest point
- Elevation: 418.5 m (1,373 ft)
- Coordinates: 51°22′13″N 9°21′58″E

Geography
- Location: Hesse, Germany

Hangarstein is a hill in Hesse, Germany.
