= Essigberg =

Coordinates: 51°18′54″N 9°20′50″E

Highest point
- Elevation: 597.5 m (1,960 ft)

Geography
- Location: Hesse, Germany

The Essigberg is a hill in Hesse, Germany.
