= Wagenberg (hill) =

Mountain in Germany

Coordinates: 49°38′17″N 8°49′07″E

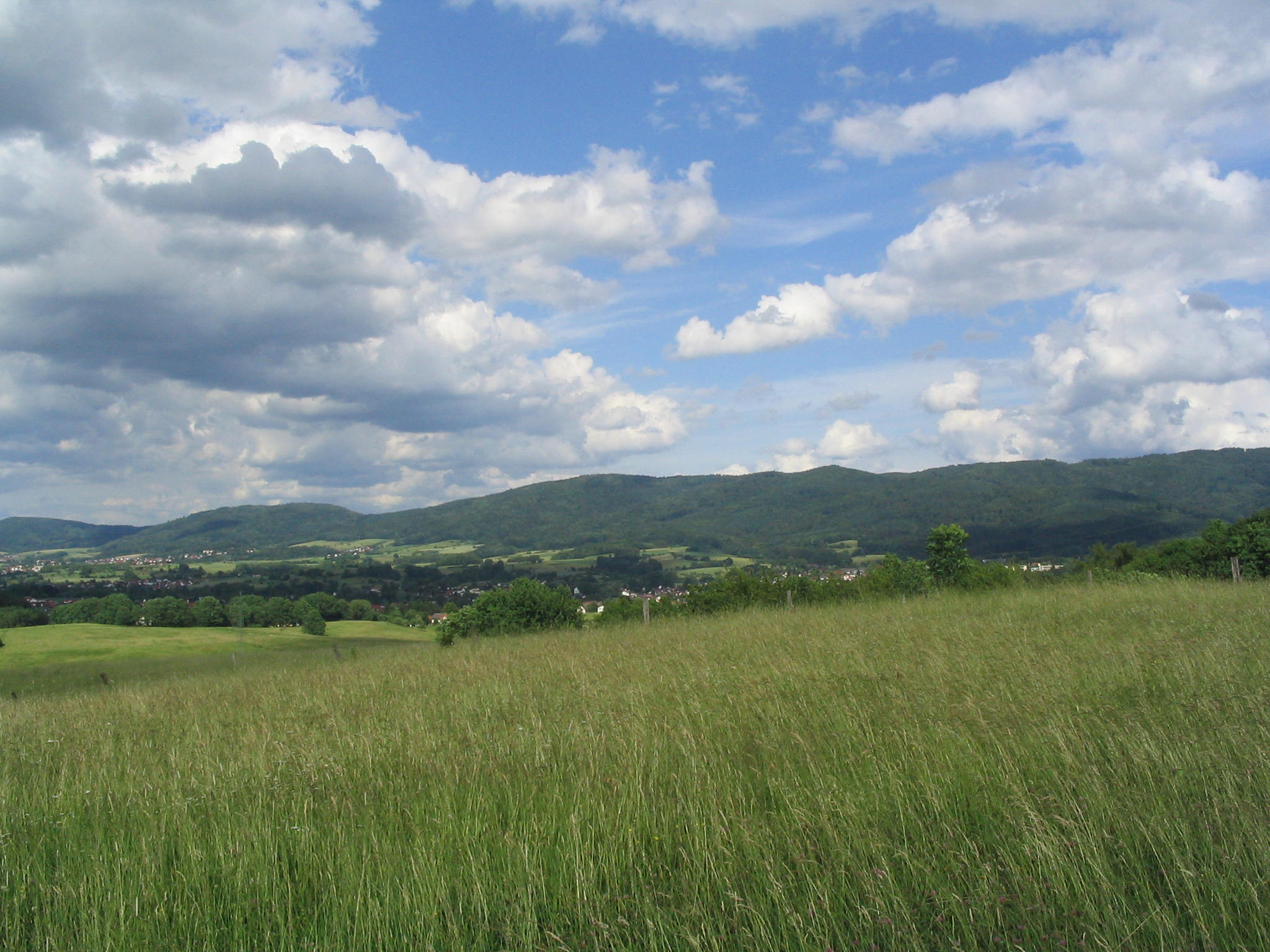
- Weschnitz Valley and northern Tromm mountain range with Krehberg, Erzberg, Wagenberg (center), Fahrenbacher Kopf, transition to the Tromm (from the left).

Highest point
- Elevation: 535.7 m (1,758 ft)

Geography
- Location: Hesse, Germany

Wagenberg is a wooded mountain ridge stretching from north to south in the Bergstraße district in the Odenwald. It is 535.7 m above sea level. The steeply sloping western part lies in the Fürth district and the eastern part in the Hammelbach district.

The Weschnitz and the Ulfenbach, also known as the Hammelbach, have their source on its eastern slope.
