= Steinwand (Rhön) =

Mountain in Germany

Coordinates: 50°31′N 9°52′E

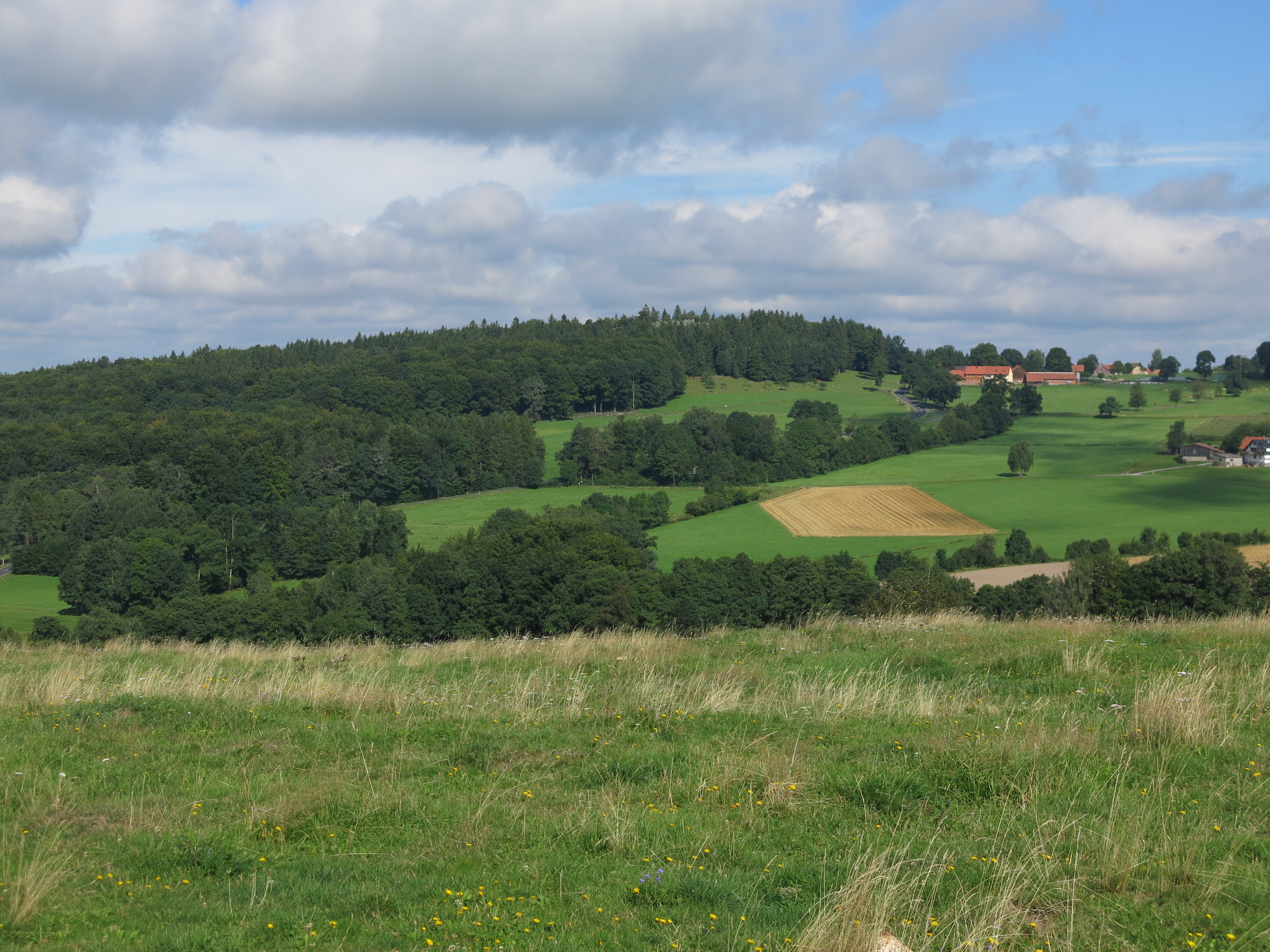
- Steinwand from the southeast.

Highest point
- Elevation: 646 m (2,119 ft)

Geography
- Location: Hesse, Germany

Steinwand is a mountain of Hesse, Germany.

== Geology ==
Steinwand is a phonolite rock formation and an outlier of the Maulkuppe massif in the Rhön Mountains. The cliff is approximately 100 m long and rises up to 25–28 m above the surrounding terrain. Its phonolite originated during the volcanic activity that shaped much of the Rhön region.

== Climbing ==
The Steinwand is one of the best-known climbing sites in the Rhön. Together with the nearby formations Teufelskanzel and Hintere Steinwand, it offers numerous climbing routes of varying difficulty and attracts climbers from across the region.

In 2025, the Steinwand was designated a National Geotope by the Academy for Geosciences and Geotechnologies because of its geological significance within the UNESCO Rhön Biosphere Reserve.
