= Söhre =

Mountain in Germany

- Location within Hesse

Highest point
- Peak: Hirschberg
- Elevation: 643.4 m (2,111 ft); DE-NHN

Geography
- State(s): Kassel, Schwalm-Eder-Kreis, Werra-Meißner-Kreis; Hesse, Germany
- Range coordinates: 51°13′41.3″N 9°36′28.9″E
- Parent range: Fulda-Werra Uplands in the East Hesse Highlands

The Söhre (German pronunciation: [ˈzøːʁə]; also called the Söhrewald) is a forested hill range of the German Central Uplands and a subordinate natural region of the Fulda-Werra Uplands (major unit 357) in North Hesse, Germany.

From a natural region perspective the Söhre, according to the Handbook of Natural Region Divisions of Germany is a sub-region (357.70) of the Kaufungen Forest and Söhre (357.7) and is home to its highest point, the Hirschberg (643.4 m above sea level (NHN)). Colloquially, however, the Söhrewald is often taken to mean just the west and centre of this region as far as the upper reaches of the Losse, an area which reaches its highest point at Bielstein (527.8 m).

The Großalmerode Graben Zone, which separates the Söhre in the north from the Kaufungen Forest Plateau, is counted as part of the Söhre.

== Geography ==
=== Location and natural regions ===
The Söhre is located on the boundary of the two counties of Kassel (west) and Werra-Meißner (east) and runs eastwards from a point roughly southeast of the city of Kassel. The entire west of the Söhre (Stiftswald Kaufungen) is part of the Frau-Holle-Land Nature Park (Werratal.Meißner.Kaufungen Forest), to the southwest the Söhre runs out into the county of Schwalm-Eder-Kreis.

In the eastern north the Söhre transitions into the Southern Kaufungen Forest at the narrow Großalmerode Graben Zone, which follows, in the extreme east the uppermost reaches of the Gelster, in a westerly direction, the Wedemann and, after its confluence, the lower reaches of the Losse.

In the northwest and west the upland descends to the Kassel Basin (343.3), part of the West Hesse Depression and valley of the Fulda.

In the south the Söhre transitions into the Melsungen Upland beyond the valley of the Mülmisch (southwest) and the Landesstraße 3228. This western part of the Söhre, which is bounded to the east by the upper Losse, is part of the aforementioned nature park and is what is colloquially called the Söhrewald – not to be confused with the municipality of Söhrewald.

East of the upper reaches of the Losse and outside the nature park, the natural region of the Söhre up to the Hirschberg reaches even greater heights, before descending relatively abruptly to the Hessian-Lichtenau Basin in the southeast and via the Rommerode Hills in the east to the Velmeder Tal, which separates the Kaufungen Forest from the Hoher Meißner, and along which the Laudenbach which flows northwards to the Gelster. The last three natural regions are parts of the Witzenhausen-Altmorschen valley system.

=== Mountains and hills ===
Among the mountains and hills of the Söhre are the following – with heights in metres (m) above sea level (NHN):

Mountain/hill	Height / m
Hirschberg northwest top: soutyheast top:	643.4; 643,4; 637,8
Hohekopf	539.4
Rohrberg	535.6
Rösberg	528,0
Bielstein	527.8
Gülsberg or Gulsberg	517.0
Exberg	505.5
Großer Belgerkopf east top: west top:	499.9; 499.9; 497.3
Kleiner Belgerkopf	490
Franzosentriesch	487.75
Michelskopf	485
Stellberg	483,75
Buchberg	482
Trieschkopf	480.1
Pfaffenberg	477.5
Sankt Ottilienberg	462.5
Ölberg	457.8
Schorn	456.8
Koppe	456.4
Badenstein	441.5
Mühlberg	441.3
Warpel	439.4
Steinkopf	427
Königsberg	410
Vockenberg	381.25

=== Waterbodies ===
==== Rivers and streams ====
Among the larger rivers in and around the Söhre are the following (each in upstream order, i.e. from north to south; length, catchment and drainage in brackets):

- Fulda (west of the Söhre), right-hand tributaries (from north to south):
  - Losse (28.9 km, 120.6 km^{2}, 1,418 L/s),
    rises outside the Söhre near Hessisch Lichtenau, its upper courses flow through the natural region from south to north and form in its lower courses, together with the right-hand tributary
    - Wedemann (5.1 km, 14.5 km^{2}, 213 L/s),
      the western and central north boundary
    - Setzebach (5.4 km, 8.208 km^{2}),
  - Wahlebach (also called the Fahrenbach or Wahle; 16.6 km, 37.9 km^{2}, 354 L/s),
    rises in the western Söhre; with the Fahrenbachsteichen
  - Schwarzenbach (6.7 km, 12,029 km^{2}),
    rises in the centre of the Söhre
  - Mülmisch (13,8 km, 35,6 km^{2}, 372 L/s),
    southern boundary stream rising in the Melsungen Upland
- (Werra – northeast outside the Söhre)
  - Gelster (18.2 km, 60.6 km^{2}, 771 L/s),
    rises north of the Hirschberg and forms the eastern north boundary in its upper reaches
    - Laudenbach (5.4 km, 16.0 km^{2}, 262 L/s),
      passes the Söhre to the east
  - Wehre (36,8 km, 451,7 km^{2}, 4.147 L/s),
    rises southeast of the Hirschberg (Exbergseen) and leaves the Söhre in a southerly direction

==== Lakes ====
The following lakes and reservoirs lie in or on the edge of the Söhre:

- Christteich
- Exbergseen (Wehre), north of the Exberg (in the Rommerode Hills)
- Fahrenbachsteiche on the Fahrenbach, the upper course of the Wahle
- Hirschhagener Teiche, south of the Rohrberg, east of Hirschhagen
- Michelskopfseen, east of the Michelskopf
- Stellbergsee (west; below the Stellberg near Wollrode)

=== Towns and villages ===
Among the towns and villages in the Söhre region and its fringes (excluding the Rommerode Hills) are the following − in clockwise order beginning in the centre and then roughly in the north):

- Söhrewald – in the centre
  (with Eiterhagen, Wattenbach, Wellerode)
- Kaufungen – in the north to north-northwest
  (with Oberkaufungen, Niederkaufungen, Papierfabrik)
- Helsa – in the northeast
  (with Eschenstruth, Helsa, St. Ottilien, Waldhof, Wickenrode)
- Großalmerode – in the east-northeast
  (with Großalmerode, Rommerode)
- Hessisch Lichtenau – in the southeast
  (with Fürstenhagen, Hirschhagen, Quentel)
- Körle – in the south to south-southwest
  (with Empfershausen, Körle)
- Guxhagen – in the southwest
  (with Albshausen, Guxhagen, Wollrode)
- Fuldabrück – in the west
  (with Bergshausen, Dennhausen, Dörnhagen)
- Lohfelden – in the northwest
  (with Vollmarshausen)

== Geology ==
The forested upland landscape of the Söhre consists mainly of bunter sandstone, from which individual basalt kuppen like the Hirschberg and the Bielstein (q. v.) project. The Großalmerode Graben Zone in the north lies on a narrow muschelkalk nappe.

== Hiking ==
The trails in the Söhre include the: Eder-Gelster Way, Kassel-Steig, Märchenlandweg and Wildbahn.

== General sources ==
- BfN
  - Map service
  - Landscape fact file: Fulda-Werra Uplands (including the Söhre, but excluding the rest of the Kaufungen Forest)
