= Fulda-Werra Uplands =

Regional unit in Hesse

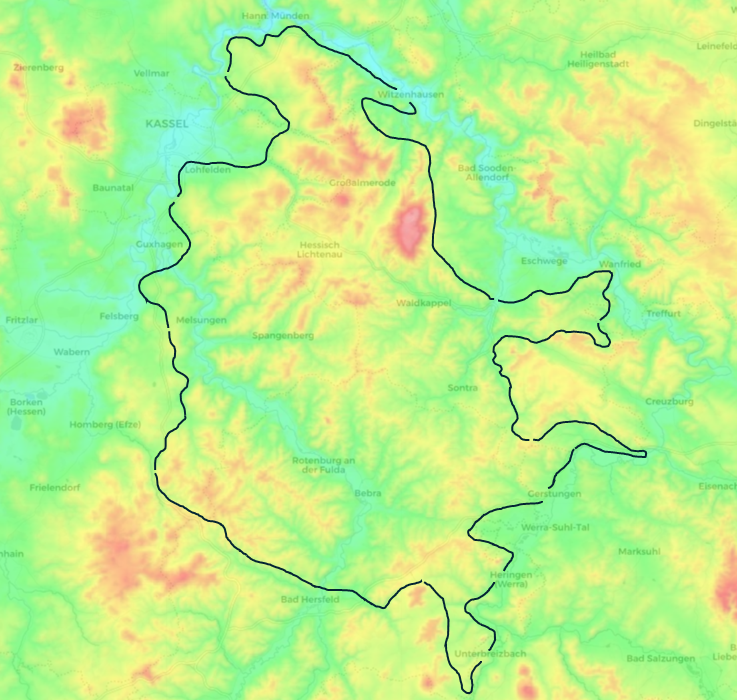
Fulda Werra-Bergland

The Fulda-Werra Uplands (German: Fulda-Werra-Bergland) are a major natural regional unit (no. 357) in the East Hesse Highlands (major unit group 35) in East and North Hesse and, with small elements in the southeast, in the German state of Thuringia. Most of the range lies right of the River Fulda and left of the Werra. The uplands extend from the Rhön mountains northwards, to the River Weser near Hann. Münden.

The best known and highest mountain and sub-range is the Hoher Meißner in the northeast which reaches a height of 753.6 m above sea level (NN). Other well known upland areas are the Kaufungen Forest in the extreme north, the Stölzinger Hills in the centre and the Seulingswald in the south.

== Hills ==
The hills of the Fulda-Werra Uplands include the following – sorted by height in metres (m) above Normalnull (NN):

- Hoher Meißner (753.6 m); Hoher Meißner in the Meißner region
- Hirschberg (643.4 m); Söhre
- Bilstein (641.2 m); Anterior Kaufungen Forest
- Eisberg (583.0 m); northern Stolzhausen Ridge in the Stölzinger Hills
- Haferberg (580.4 m); Hinterer Kaufungen Forest
- Himmelsberg (563.7 m); Günsterode Heights in the Melsungen Upland
- Alheimer (548.7 m); southern Stolzhausen Ridge in the Stölzinger Hills
- Dammskopf (520.9 m); Rotenburg-Ludwigseck Forest in the Neuenstein-Ludwigseck Ridge (near Schloss Ludwigseck by Atzelstein)
- Bielstein (527.8 m); Söhre
- Katzenstirn (500.7 m); southern Vockerode Upland in the Stölzinger Hills
- Toter Mann (480.3 m); Seulingswald
- Eichelsberg (480.1 m); Eichelsberg in the Neuenstein-Ludwigseck Ridge
- Herzberg (478.2 m); Richelsdorf Hills (Solztrottenwald)
- Kessel (368.1 m); Melgershausen Heights in the Neuenstein-Ludwigseck Ridge

== Rivers ==
The most important tributaries of the Fulda and Werra in the upland region named after them are (in upstream order, i.e. from north to south, rivers outside the boundary in brackets, lengths also in brackets):

- left-hand Fulda tributaries
  - Beise (20.9 km)
  - Wichte (9.7 km)
  - Rohrbach (18.0 km)
  - (Geisbach (22,1 km))
- right-hand Fulda tributaries
  - Nieste (21.8 km)
  - Losse (28.9 km)
  - Pfieffe (21.5 km)
  - Kehrenbach (12 km)
  - Ulfe (10.6 km)
  - (Solz (21.4 km))
- left-hand Werra tributaries
  - Gelster (17.5 km)
  - Berka (9.8 km)
  - Wehre (36.4 km)
  - (Ulster (57.2 km))

== General sources ==
- BfN landscape fact files:
  - Fulda-Werra Uplands (except the Kaufungen Forest, Meißner region and Bebra-Melsungen Fulda valley)
  - Meißner region
  - Kaufungen Forest (except the Söhre)
  - Bebra-Melsunger Fulda valley
- "Geologische Übersichtskarte von Hessen". Geschichtlicher Atlas von Hessen. In: Landesgeschichtliches Informationssystem Hessen (LAGIS).
