= Hirschberg (Kaufungen Forest) =

Mountain in Germany

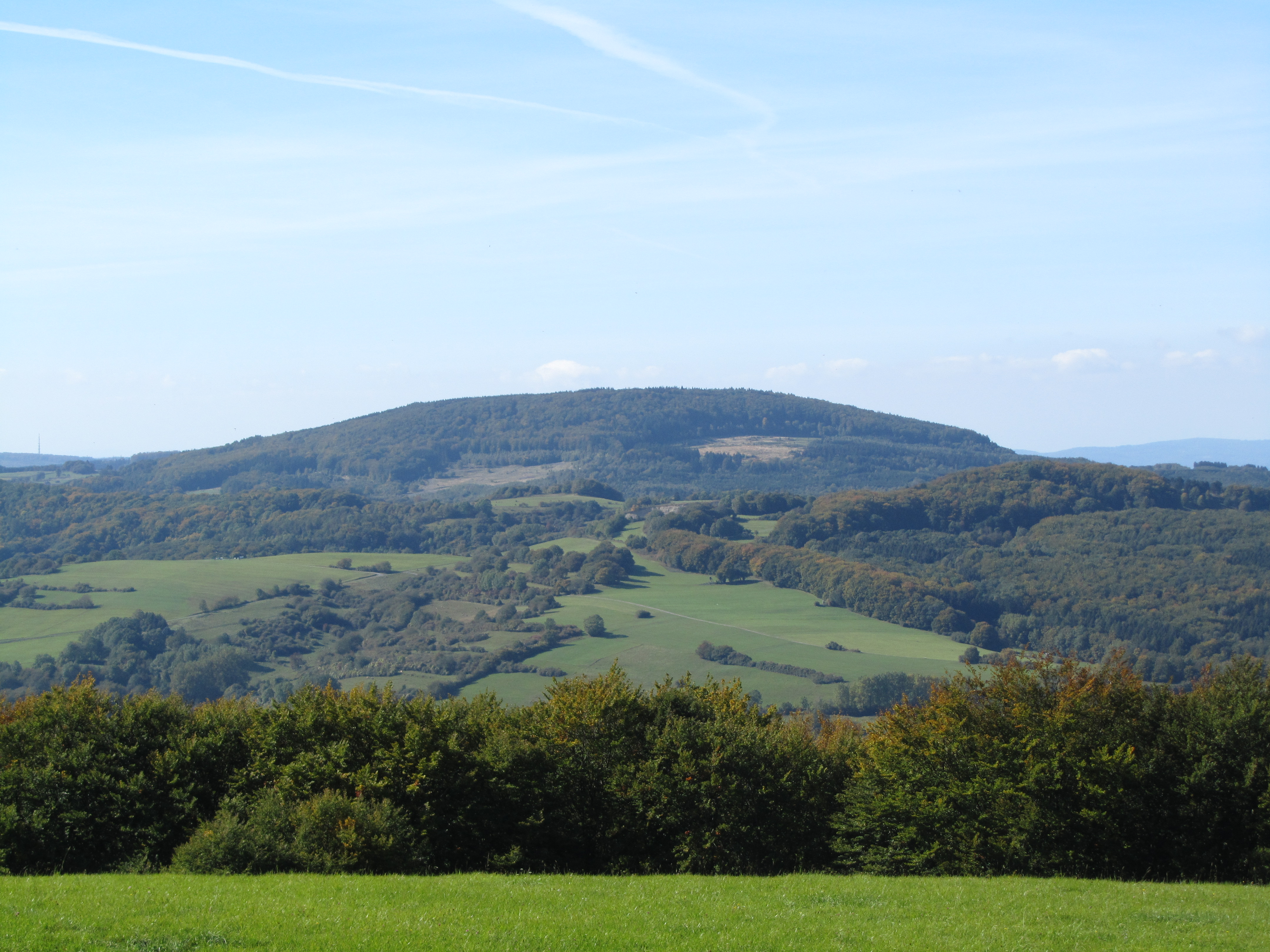
- View of Hirschberg in the Kaufungen Forest from Heiligenberg

Highest point
- Elevation: 643.4 m (2,111 ft)

Geography
- Location: Hesse, Germany

The Hirschberg is a mountain in Germany rising to an elevation of 2,111 feet (643.4 meters) above sea level, is the highest peak in the Kaufunger Forest, located in the state of Hesse. It lies near the town of Großalmerode, primarily within the Werra-Meißner district, with parts of its slopes extending into the neighboring Kassel district. The mountain forms part of the Fulda-Werra Highlands, specifically in the eastern section of the Söhre range, which borders the southern edge of the Kaufunger Forest’s main plateau.

== Geography ==
The mountain is located within the Frau-Holle-Land Geopark, roughly 1.5 miles southwest of Großalmerode’s town center, roughly 1.2 miles northwest of Rommerode, and around 1.2 kilometers southeast of Wickenrode. The nearest major city is Kassel, located approximately 12.4 miles to the northwest.

Several streams originate on or near the Hirschberg. The Wedemann rises on its northwestern slope and flows into the Losse, while the Wehre begins just southeast of the mountain. The Gelster originates on the Pfaffenberg, a northern side of the Hirschberg. All three streams are tributaries of the Werra River.

The upper elevations of the Hirschberg are mostly covered with dense forest. However, there are several clearings. One of the largest is on the southwestern plateau, where open-pit mining for brown coal resulted in a clearing 140 to 165 meters wide.

At the base of the mountain, on the northern and southwestern sides, are two areas that are part of the Hirschberg and Tiefenbach Meadows, which are protected under the European Union’s Habitats Directive as a Special Area of Conservation.
