= Laudenbach (Gelster) =

River in Germany

Location
- Country: Germany
- States: Hesse

Physical characteristics
- Mouth
  - location: Gelster
  - coordinates: 51.2601°N 9.8313°E

Basin features
- Progression: Gelster→ Werra→ Weser→ North Sea

Laudenbach (German pronunciation: [ˈlaʊdn̩bax]) is a river of Hesse, Germany. It runs predominantly in northerly direction entirely by rural districts and agricultural areas of Großalmerode. It is a right tributary of the Gelster.

== See also ==
- List of rivers of Hesse
