= Platzer MA 12 P/Nissan =

German aircraft engine

- Type: Aircraft engine
- National origin: Germany
- Manufacturer: Michael Platzer

The Platzer MA 12 P/Nissan is a German aircraft engine, produced by Michael Platzer of Guxhagen for use in ultralight aircraft.

== Design and development ==
The engine is a four-cylinder four-stroke, in-line, 1,235 cc (75.4 cu in) displacement, liquid-cooled, automotive conversion gasoline engine design. It has a poly V belt reduction drive with a reduction ratio of 2.6:1. It employs a magneto ignition system and produces 33 hp (25 kW) at 5600 rpm. The engine has a compression ratio of 10.3:1.

== Specifications (Platzer MA 12 P/Nissan) ==
Data from Tacke

=== General characteristics ===
- Type: Four-cylinder, four-stroke aircraft engine
- Bore: 71 mm (2.8 in)
- Stroke: 78 mm (3.1 in)
- Displacement: 1,235 cc (75.4 cu in)
- Length: 650 mm (25.6 in)
- Width: 550 mm (21.7 in)
- Height: 400 mm (15.7 in)
- Dry weight: 54 kg (119.0 lb)

=== Components ===
- Fuel type: gasoline
- Cooling system: liquid
- Reduction gear: poly V belt

=== Performance ===
- Power output: 33 hp (25 kW)

== See also ==
Related lists

- List of aircraft engines
