= Fürstenhagen (Hessisch Lichtenau) =

Village and district of Hessisch Lichtenau, Hesse, Germany

- District of Hessisch Lichtenau
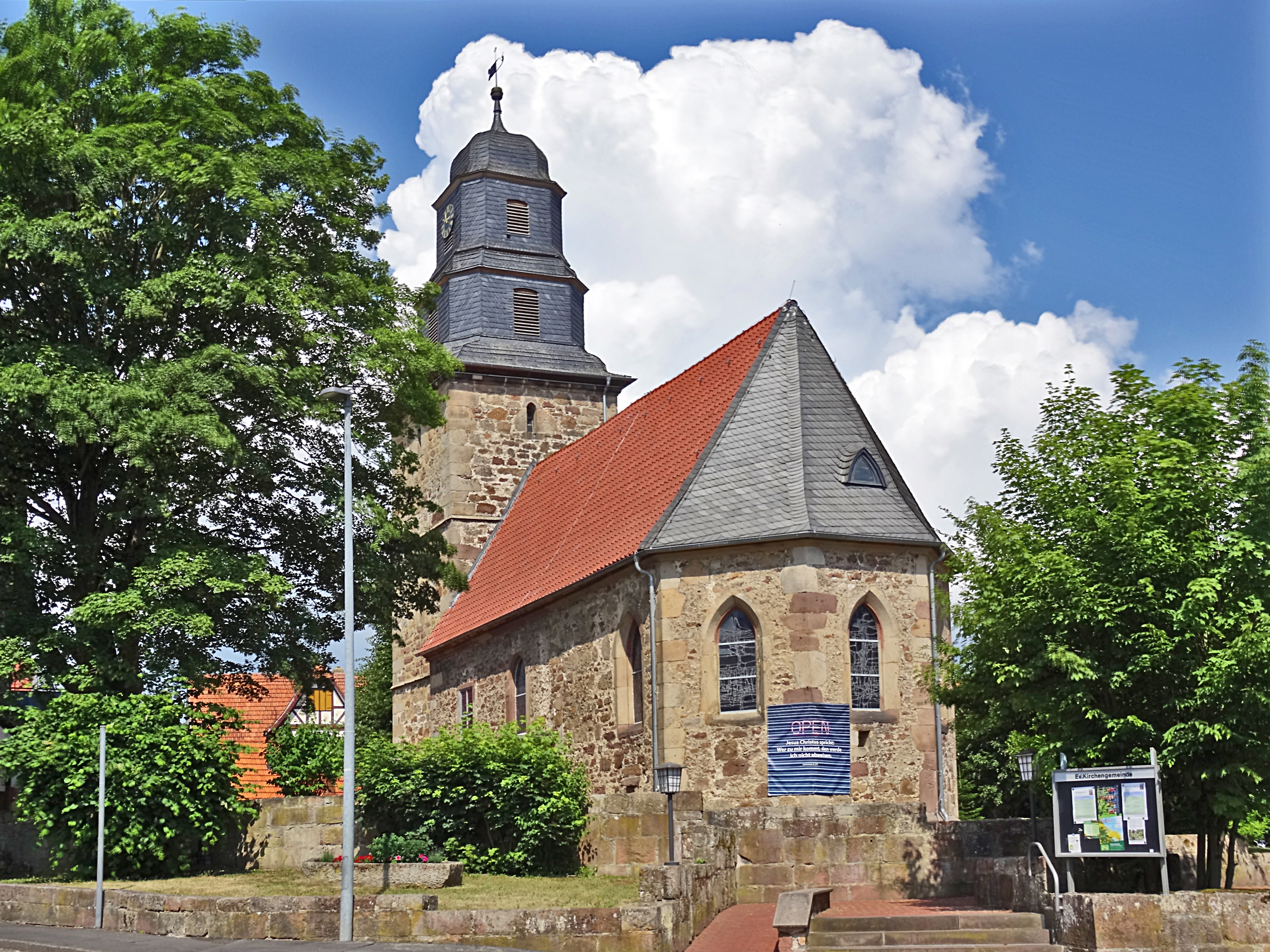
- Evangelical church of Fürstenhagen

- Location in Germany
- Coordinates: 51.21125°N 9.69014°E
- Country: Germany
- State: Hesse
- District: Werra-Meißner-Kreis
- Town: Hessisch Lichtenau

Population (2011)
  - Total: 1,905
- Time zone: UTC+1 (CET)
  - Summer (DST): UTC+2 (CEST)
- Postal code: 37235
- Area code: 05602

Fürstenhagen is the largest district (Ortsteil) of the town of Hessisch Lichtenau in the Werra-Meißner-Kreis of northern Hesse, Germany. The village lies in the Losse valley, between the Kaufunger Wald and the Söhre hills, and is part of the Geo-Naturpark Frau-Holle-Land.

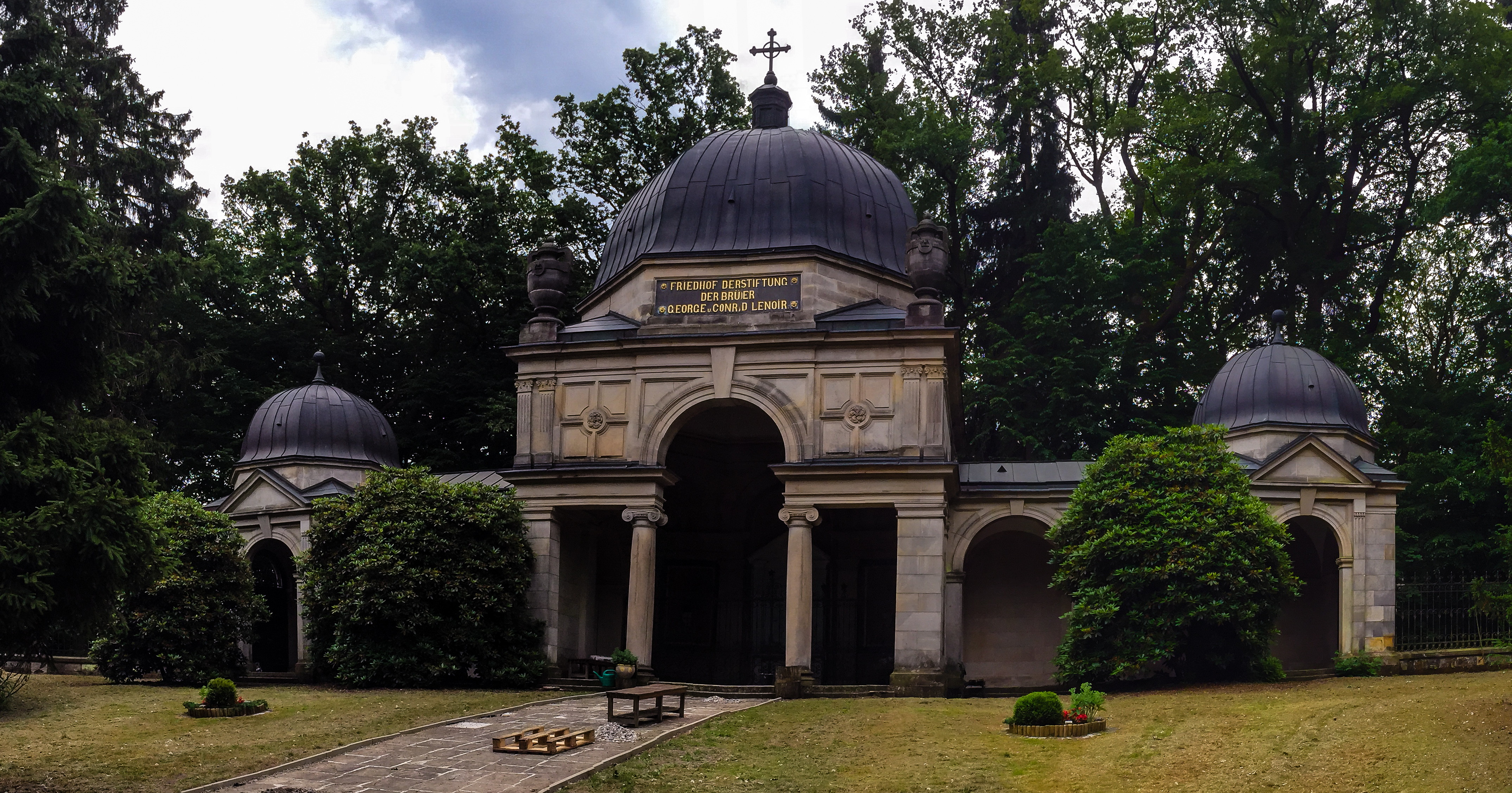
Mausoleum of the Lenoir brothers in Fürstenhagen

== Geography ==
Fürstenhagen lies along the Losse, a right-bank tributary of the Fulda, north-west of the Hessisch Lichtenau town center. The river enters the district downstream of its confluence with the Saubach stream and continues through the Losse valley towards Helsa and Kassel.

== History ==
The locality was first documented on 13 March 1312 with a mention of the knight Konrad von Vorstenhagen (later spellings include Fustinhain, Fürstenhain and Fürstenhayn). In the Middle Ages Fürstenhagen belonged to the court district of Reichenbach and from 1454 to 1821 to the Amt (government office) of Lichtenau; during the Napoleonic period it lay in the Canton of Lichtenau within the Kingdom of Westphalia.

As part of Hesse's territorial reform, the previously independent municipality of Fürstenhagen was incorporated into Hessisch Lichtenau with effect from 1 January 1974 by the Gesetz zur Neugliederung der Landkreise Eschwege und Witzenhausen [Law on the reorganization of the districts of Eschwege and Witzenhausen], which also created the Werra-Meißner district.

Hessisch Lichtenau hosted the state festival Hessentag in 2006, which brought major infrastructure attention to the area that includes Fürstenhagen.

In June 2012 Fürstenhagen marked the 700th anniversary of its first recorded mention; local history groups published a commemorative booklet and events were covered by the regional press.

=== Lenoir Foundation ===
At the turn of the 20th century the brothers George André and Conrad Lenoir endowed an orphanage complex in Fürstenhagen (often referred to as the Lenoir-Stiftung), with several principal buildings and a Pestalozzi memorial; the family mausoleum (1903–1904) stands nearby. The foundation is legally independent and administered by the City of Kassel.

== Demographics ==
At the 2011 Census reference date (9 May 2011) Fürstenhagen had 1,905 inhabitants; 261 were under 18 years old and 444 were aged 65 or over. There were 858 private households in the district.

== Transport ==
Fürstenhagen lies on the federal highway B 7 (Kassel–Eisenach). Passenger services on the Kassel–Waldkappel railway (Lossetalbahn) between Hessisch Lichtenau and Kassel were reintroduced in 2006 as part of the Kassel tram/RegioTram system, after regular passenger traffic on the line had been discontinued in 1985. The A44's 4.2-km Tunnel Hirschhagen between Helsa and Hessisch Lichtenau opened to traffic in October 2022, improving regional connectivity.

== Culture and sights ==
- The Evangelical parish church, with late-medieval origins, stands above the village; a village bakehouse is nearby. The church fabric is documented from the late 15th century; its west tower and later Gothic choir are noted in local reporting. A pre-Reformation winged altar sold in 1886/87 is now in the Hessisches Landesmuseum Kassel; a baptismal font dated 1568 was transferred to the Religionskundliche Sammlung of the University of Marburg.
- The historic bakehouse and the lime-lined former court site under the church are part of the village ensemble and feature in the annual "Tag des offenen Denkmals" programme.
- In the street called Siedlung several timber-framed houses were built at the beginning of the Second World War in connection with the explosives factory in the Hirschhagen district; families from the plant management lived there.
- The local chapter of the Naturfreunde established an open-air stage in a former quarry; it continues to host events and walking-day gatherings.

== Notable people ==
- Johannes Kregelius (1826–1913), known locally as "der Krawaller" (the troublemaker), ran the guest-house Zum Krawaller; his grave is in the village cemetery.
- Richard Assmann (1887–1965), painter and graphic artist, lived and died in Fürstenhagen.

== Gallery ==
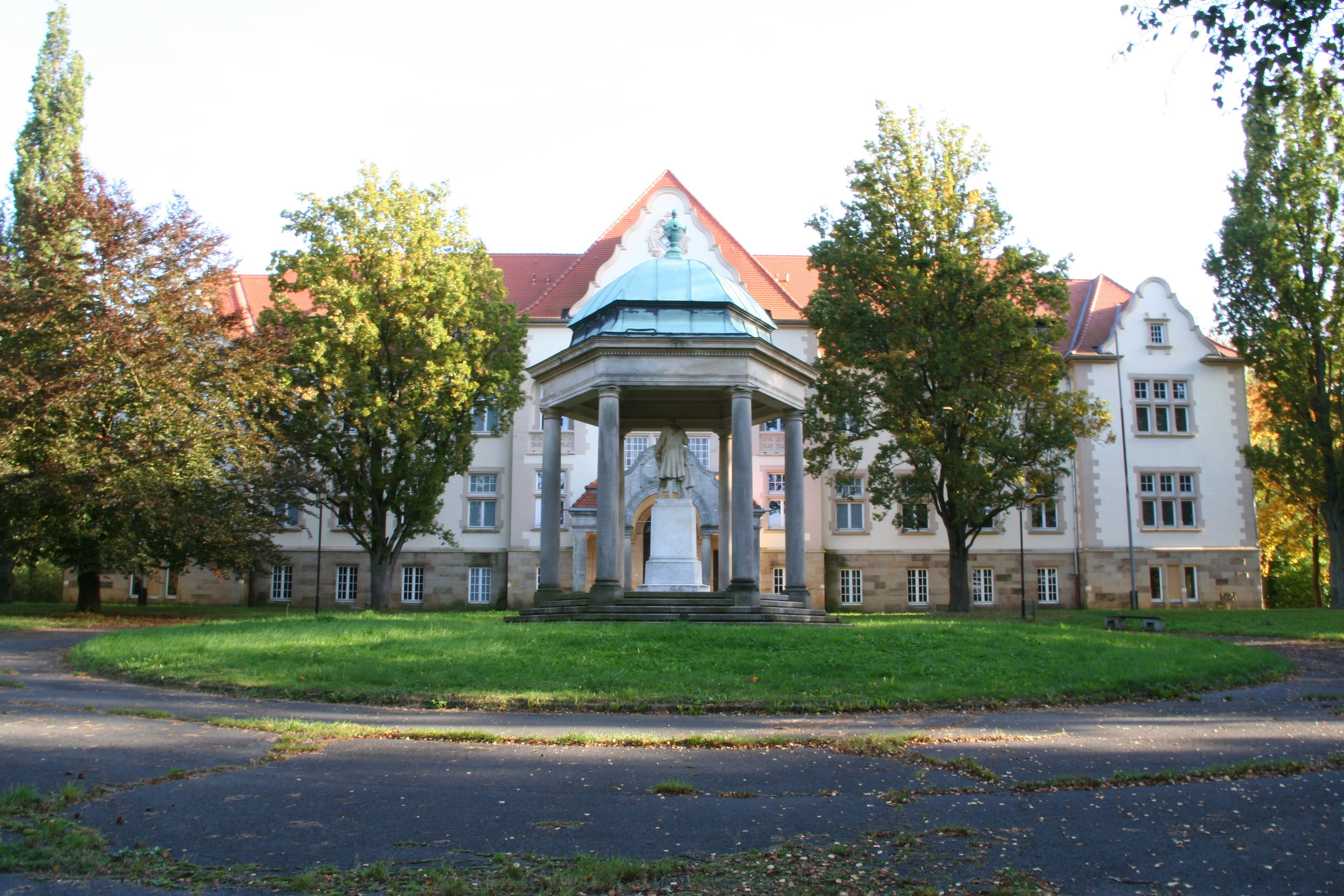
Lenoir-Stiftung main building.

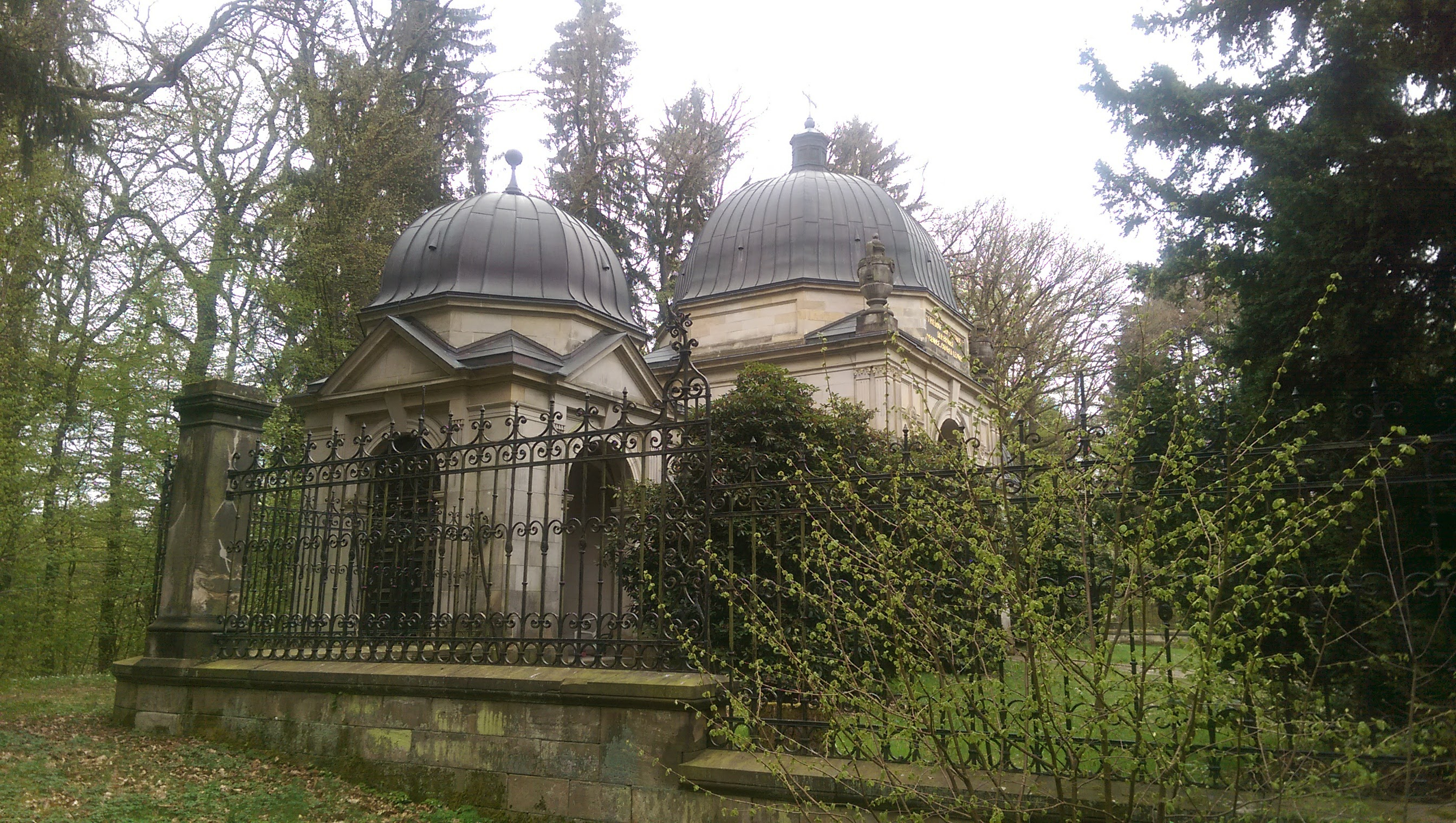
Mausoleum of the Lenoir family in Fürstenhagen.

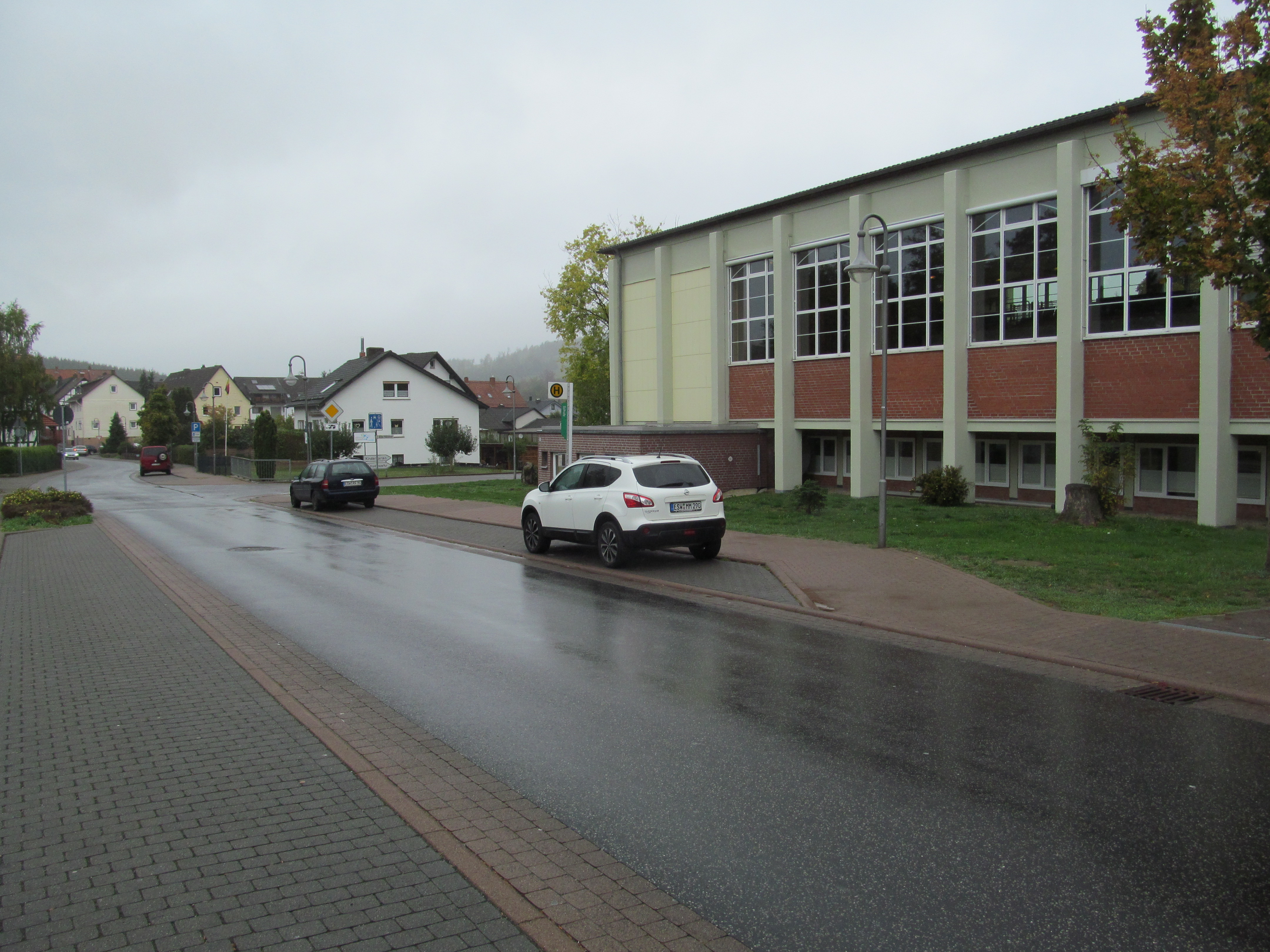
Bus stop near the school in Fürstenhagen.

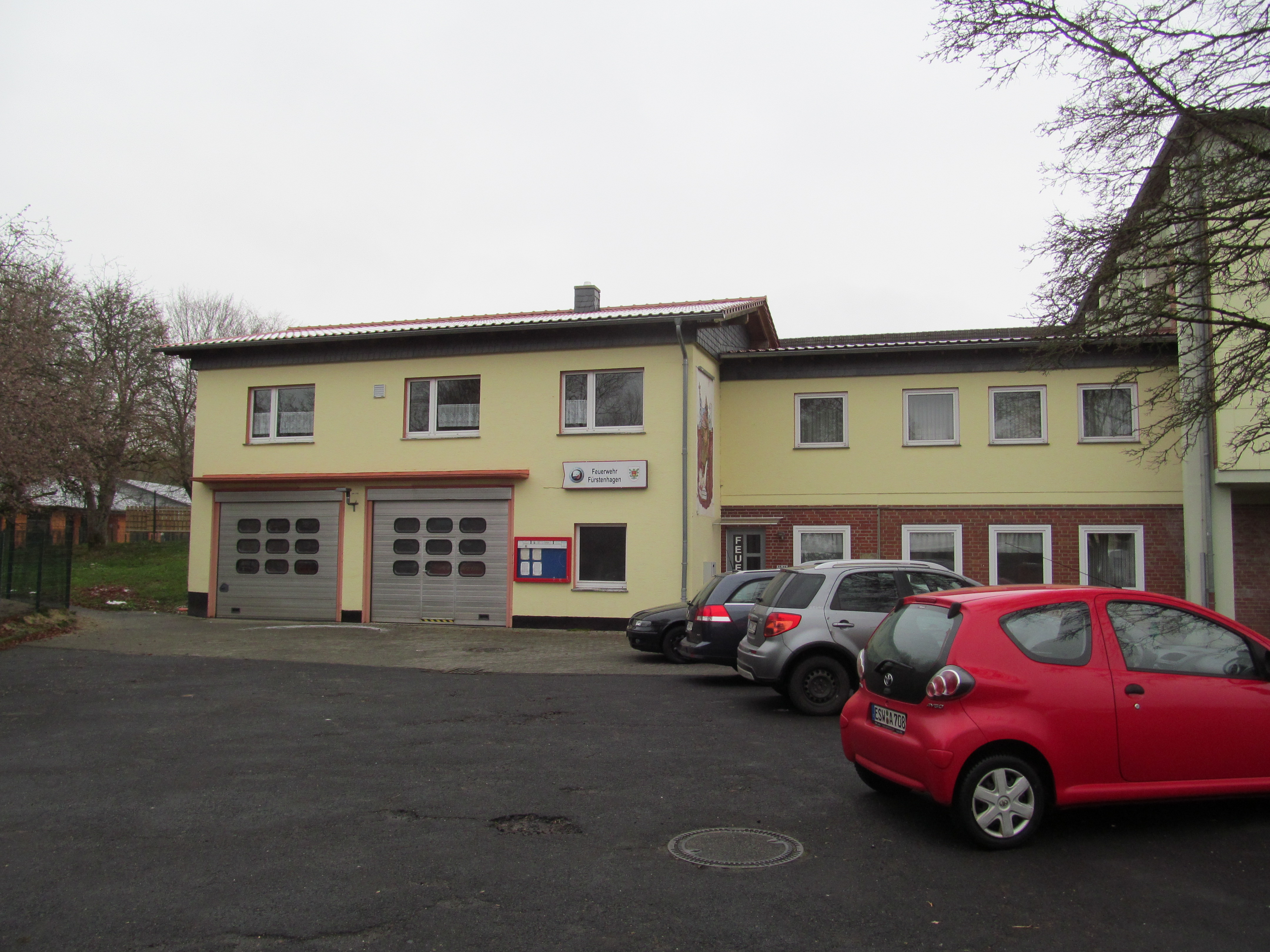
Volunteer fire brigade station (Freiwillige Feuerwehr Fürstenhagen).
