= Dennhausen =

- Village of Fuldabrück
- Interactive map of Dennhausen
- Location within Germany Location within Hesse
- Coordinates: 51°15′4.94″N 9°29′18.77″E
- Country: Germany
- State: Hesse
- District: Kassel
- Municipality: Fuldabrück
- Elevation: 150 m (490 ft)
- Time zone: UTC+01:00 (CET)
  - Summer (DST): UTC+02:00 (CEST)
- Postal codes: 34277

Dennhausen is a village in Fuldabrück in the Kassel district of Hessen. The village, combined with Dittershausen, has 2834 citizens.

== Location ==
The village lies in a loop of the Fulda at the Söhre. To the west is the Kassel West Autobahnkreuz, where the Bundesautobahn 44 and Bundesautobahn 49 cross. The Landesstraße 3124 runs through the village.

The economies of Dennhausen and Dittershausen are intertwined. The village center is called "Dalles", the place in the intersection of the Haupt and Dörnhagener Straße.

== History ==
Dennhausen was mentioned for the first time in 1253 as Tenhusen. The current name of the village has been in use since 1744. The village owned Kloster Breitenau (today Guxhagen) since 1253 and a third of the fishing. This parish was mentioned for the first time in 1289.
