= Floh-Seligenthal =

- Municipality
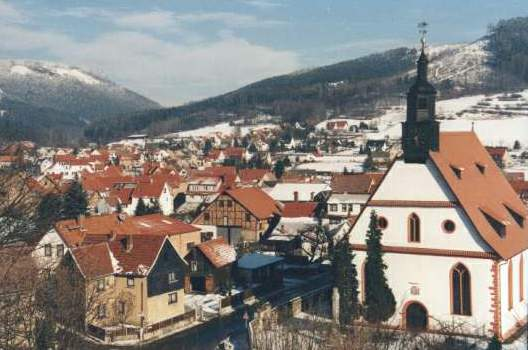
- Seligenthal in winter

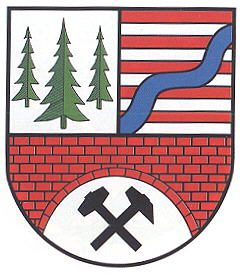
- Coat of arms

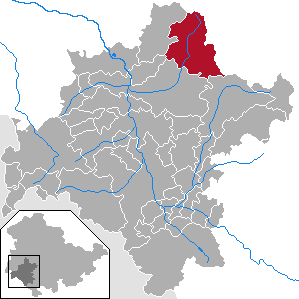
- Location of Floh-Seligenthal within Schmalkalden-Meiningen district
- Interactive map of Floh-Seligenthal
- Location within Germany Location within Thuringia
- Coordinates: 50°45′N 10°29′E
- Country: Germany
- State: Thuringia
- District: Schmalkalden-Meiningen
- Subdivisions: 6

Government
  - Mayor (2024–30): Ralf Holland-Nell (CDU)

Area
  - Total: 68.78 km^{2} (26.56 sq mi)
- Elevation: 340–480 m (1,120–1,570 ft)

Population (2025-12-31)
  - Total: 5,566
  - Density: 80.92/km^{2} (209.6/sq mi)
- Time zone: UTC+01:00 (CET)
  - Summer (DST): UTC+02:00 (CEST)
- Postal codes: 98593
- Dialling codes: 03683, 036849
- Vehicle registration: SM
- Website: www.floh-seligenthal.de

Floh-Seligenthal is a municipality in the district Schmalkalden-Meiningen, in Thuringia, Germany.

== Notable people ==
=== Born in Floh-Seligenthal ===
- Johann Michael Bach III, (1745 - 1820) German composer, lawyer and music theorist
- Carola Anding, (* 1960) East German cross-country skier

=== Notable residents ===
- Gerhard Grimmer, (1943-2023) East German cross-country skier
- Matthias Jacob, (* 1960) East German biathlete
- Frank Luck, (* 1967)German and before 1990 East German biathlete
- René Hoppe, (* 1976) German bobsledder
- Sven Fischer, (* 1971) German biathlete

== Town twinning ==
Floh-Seligenthal is twinned with:

- Châteauneuf-en-Thymerais, France
- Körle, Germany
