= Karl Glinzer =

German painter (1802–1878)

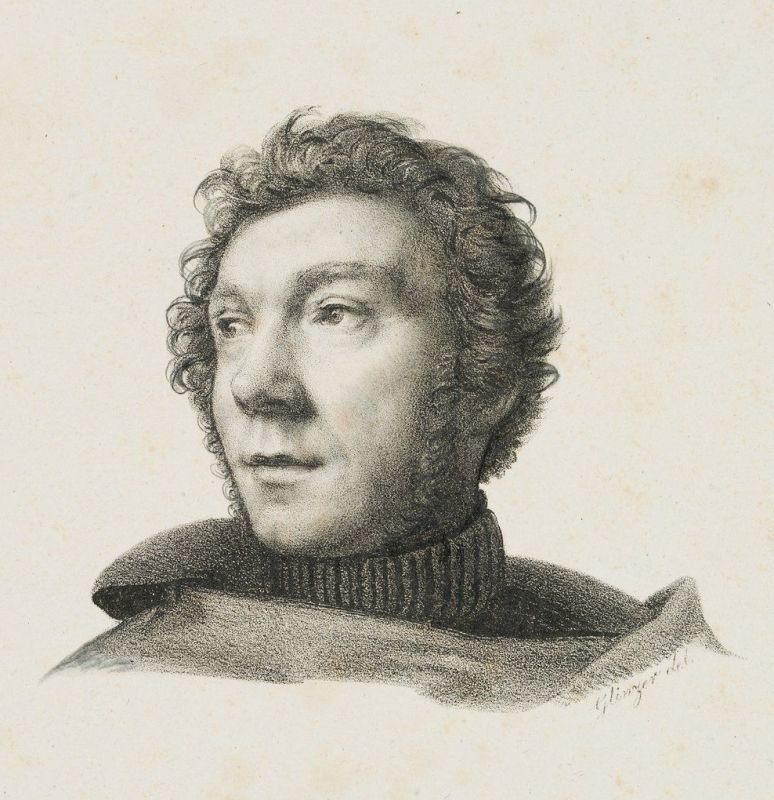
Self-portrait (date unknown)

Justus Wilhelm Karl Glinzer (2 February 1802 – 28 April 1878) was a German painter and lithographer, in the Biedermeier style. He worked in several genres, although he is primarily remembered for portraits.

== Biography ==
He was born in Guxhagen to Sebastian Glinzer, a mill owner who had served as a Lieutenant with the Hessians. A few years after his father's death in 1808, his mother sold their property and moved the family to Kassel. The money derived from this would provide decades of financial security.

His first drawing lessons were in the public schools of Kassel. Later, he attended a formal drawing school, followed by studies with Justus Krauskopf, who would become a lifelong mentor. In 1820, he went to Munich, where he attended the Academy of Fine Arts. He returned to Kassel in 1822.

In 1825, he made his way to Paris and took private lessons in "drawing from life" with Antoine-Jean Gros. He also spent time at the Louvre, copying the Old Masters. During most of his time there, he focused on producing nudes.

By 1826, he was back in Kassel, where he initially worked as a freelance painter. From 1833 to 1834, he accompanied Krauskopf on a trip to Rome and Naples, where he created works in imitation of the Nazarenes. After many years of making a living from commissioned portraits, the economic situation in Kassel forced him to take up teaching. By the 1850s, he had his own private drawing school, but held classes at the municipal Realschule and a private girls' school as well.

He also published writings on teaching art; Der Zeichenunterricht in der Volksschule. Nothwendigkeit einer Reform desselben ("Drawing lessons in elementary school. Necessity of a reform of the same") and Der Elementar-Zeichenunterricht nach Dictaten, allein mögliche Unterrichts-Methode im eng zugemessenen Raum der Volksschule ("Elementary drawing lessons according to dictates, the only possible teaching method in the tightly allocated space of the elementary school"), both from 1868. He advertised himself as a strict adherent of the methods used by Jacques-Louis David.

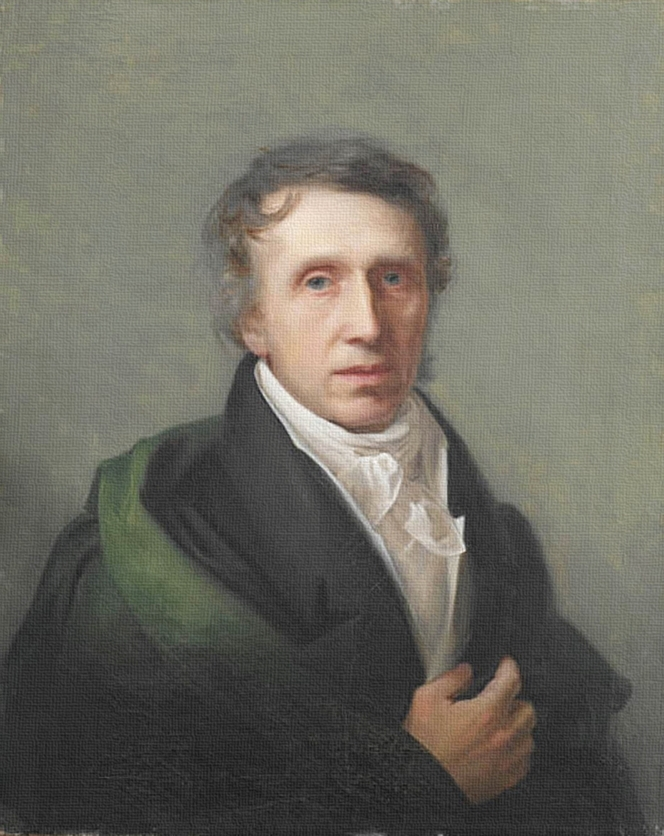
Portrait of Ludwig Hummel

In addition to his portraits, he produced lithographic nature studies, some scenes from mythology, and a few religious works; notably "On the Road to Emmaus" for a church in the Wehlheiden district of Kassel.

He died in 1878 in Kassel.
