= Stellbergsee =

Lake in Hesse, Germany

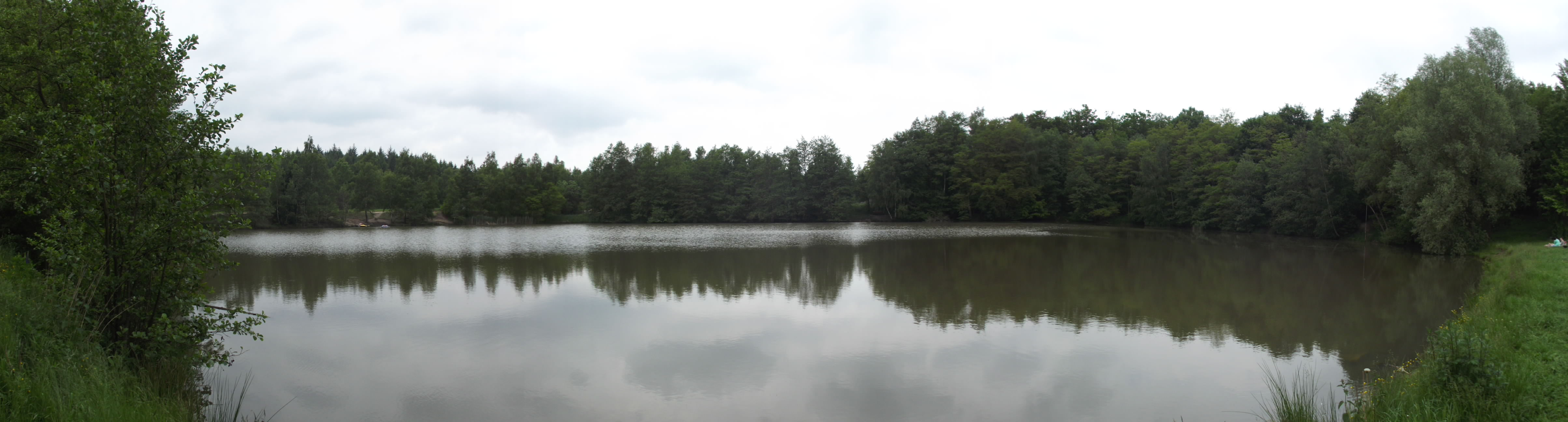

- Location within Hesse
- Location: Söhre, Landkreis Kassel and Schwalm-Eder-Kreis, Hesse
- Coordinates: 51°12′48″N 9°33′8″E
- Basin countries: Germany
- Surface area: 0.014 km^{2} (0.0054 sq mi)
- Max. depth: ca. 30 m (98 ft)
- Surface elevation: 356 m (1,168 ft)

Stellbergsee is a lake in Söhre, Landkreis Kassel and Schwalm-Eder-Kreis, Hesse, Germany. At an elevation of 356 m, its surface area is 0.014 km^{2}.
