= Mülmisch =

River in Germany

Location
- Country: Germany
- State: Hesse

Physical characteristics
- Mouth
  - location: Fulda
  - coordinates: 51.1631°N 9.5325°E
- Length: 13.8 km (8.6 mi)

Basin features
- Progression: Fulda→ Weser→ North Sea

Mülmisch is a river of Hesse, Germany. It flows into the Fulda in Körle.

== See also ==
- List of rivers of Hesse
