= Mühlenstein =

Mountain in Germany

Coordinates: 51°18′18″N 9°46′04″E

Highest point
- Elevation: 607.2 m (1,992 ft)

Geography
- Location: Hesse, Germany

Mühlenstein is the third highest mountain in the Kaufungen Forest of northern Hesse, Germany.
