= Wahlebach =

River in Germany

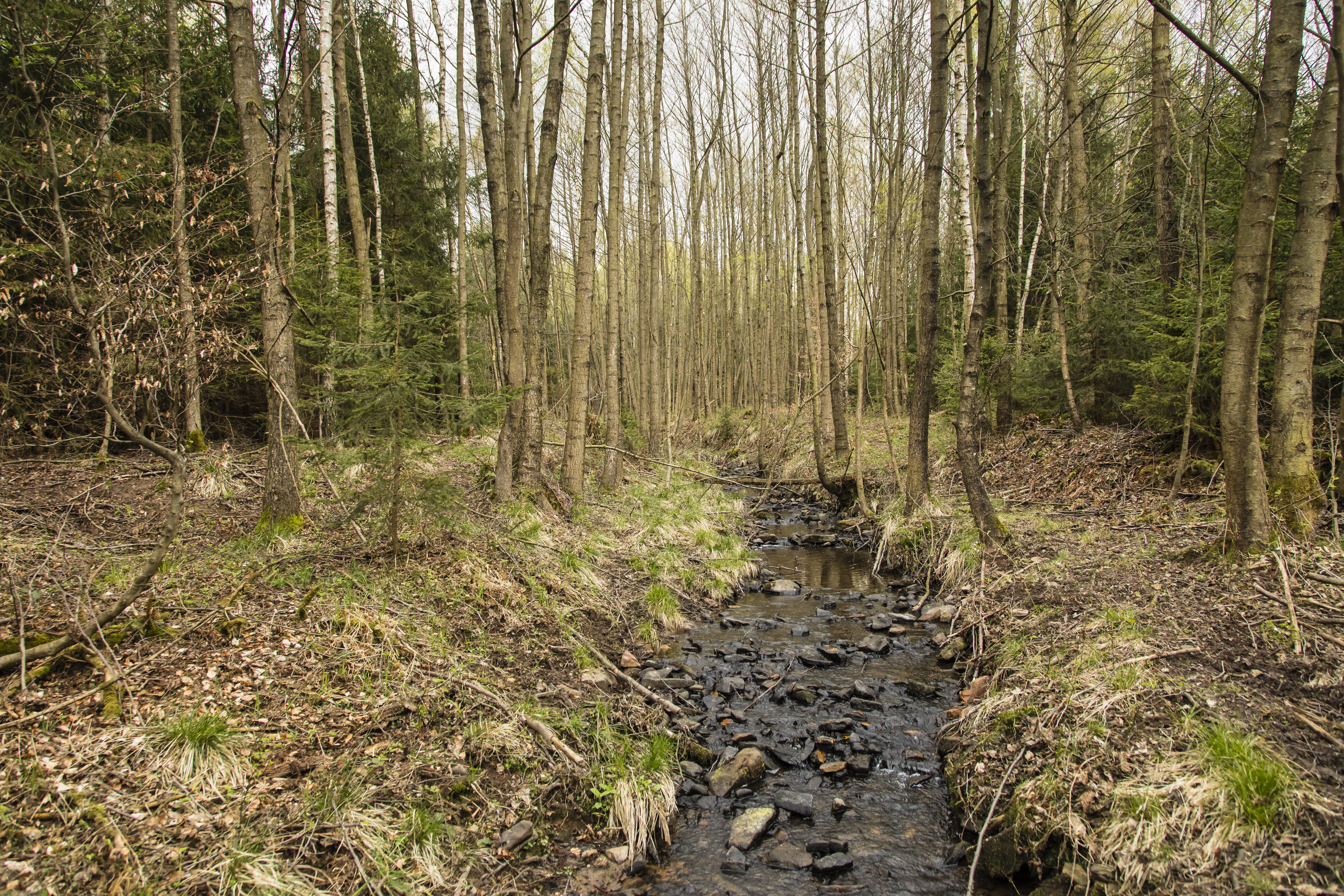

Location
- Country: Germany
- State: Hesse

Physical characteristics
- Mouth
  - location: Fulda
  - coordinates: 51.3172°N 9.5171°E
- Length: 16.6 km (10.3 mi)

Basin features
- Progression: Fulda→ Weser→ North Sea

Wahlebach (in its upper course: Fahrenbach) is a river of Hesse, Germany. It flows into the Fulda in Kassel.

== See also ==
- List of rivers of Hesse
