= Herzberg (Richelsdorf Hills) =

Coordinates: 51°00′03″N 9°57′17″E

Highest point
- Elevation: 478.2 m (1,569 ft)

Geography
- Location: Hesse, Germany

Herzberg is a hill of Hesse, Germany.
