= Fuldabrück =

- Municipality
- Coat of arms

- Location of Fuldabrück within Kassel district
- Interactive map of Fuldabrück
- Location within Germany Location within Hesse
- Coordinates: 51°24′N 09°28′E
- Country: Germany
- State: Hesse
- Admin. region: Kassel
- District: Kassel

Government
  - Mayor (2017–23): Dieter Lengemann (SPD)

Area
  - Total: 17.85 km^{2} (6.89 sq mi)
- Elevation: 266 m (873 ft)

Population (2025-12-31)
  - Total: 5,053
  - Density: 283.1/km^{2} (733.2/sq mi)
- Time zone: UTC+01:00 (CET)
  - Summer (DST): UTC+02:00 (CEST)
- Postal codes: 34277
- Dialling codes: 0561
- Vehicle registration: KS
- Website: www.fuldabrueck.de

Fuldabrück is a municipality in the district of Kassel, in Hesse, Germany. It is situated along the Fulda river, 8 kilometers south of Kassel. The municipality of Fuldabrück consists of the former independent villages Bergshausen, Dittershausen, Dennhausen and Dörnhagen.

The total area is 17.85 square kilometers, with a population of 8682 people, including 4250 males and 4432 females (as of December 31, 2011), and a population density of 486 people per square kilometer.

== Geography ==
Fuldabrück borders with 5 communities:

- Kassel in the northwest,
- Lohfelden in the northeast,
- Söhrewald in the east,
- Guxhagen in the south,
- Baunatal in the west
