= Wehre =

River in Germany

Location
- Country: Germany
- State: Hesse

Physical characteristics
- Mouth
  - location: Werra
  - coordinates: 51.2°N 10.01°E
- Length: 36.4 km (22.6 mi)
- Basin size: 451 km^{2} (174 sq mi)

Basin features
- Progression: Werra→ Weser→ North Sea

Wehre (German pronunciation: [ˈveːʁə]) is a river in Hesse, Germany. Its source is in the Kaufungen Forest, near the village Rommerode. It flows into the Werra near Eschwege.

== See also ==
- List of rivers of Hesse
