= Söhrewald =

- Municipality
- Coat of arms

- Location of Söhrewald within Kassel district
- Interactive map of Söhrewald
- Location within Germany Location within Hesse
- Coordinates: 51°13′N 09°37′E
- Country: Germany
- State: Hesse
- Admin. region: Kassel
- District: Kassel

Government
  - Mayor (2022–28): Ralf Eberwein (SPD)

Area
  - Total: 58.9 km^{2} (22.7 sq mi)
- Elevation: 350 m (1,150 ft)

Population (2025-12-31)
  - Total: 4,451
  - Density: 75.6/km^{2} (196/sq mi)
- Time zone: UTC+01:00 (CET)
  - Summer (DST): UTC+02:00 (CEST)
- Postal codes: 34320
- Dialling codes: 05608
- Vehicle registration: KS
- Website: www.soehrewald.de

Söhrewald is a municipality in the district of Kassel, in Hesse, Germany. It is located 13 kilometers southeast of Kassel. The municipality was formed by the former independent municipalities Eiterhagen, Wattenbach and Wellerode in 1970.

== Geography ==
Söhrewald borders in the north to the municipality Lohfelden, in the northeast to the municipality Kaufungen and Helsa all three in the district of Kassel), in the east to the city of Hessisch Lichtenau (Werra-Meißner-Kreis), in the south with the city of Melsungen, in the southeast to the municipality Körle and in the west to the municipality Guxhagen (all the three in the district of Schwalm-Eder)
