= Michelskopf =

Hill in Hesse, Germany

Coordinates: 51°15′08″N 9°39′01″E

Highest point
- Elevation: 485 m (1,591 ft)

Geography
- Location: Hesse, Germany

The Michelskoph is a mountain peak near Oberkaufungen in Kaufungen. It rises to an elevation of 485 meters (1,591 feet) and is part of the Geo-Naturpark Frau-Holle-Land.
