= Lohfelden =

- Municipality
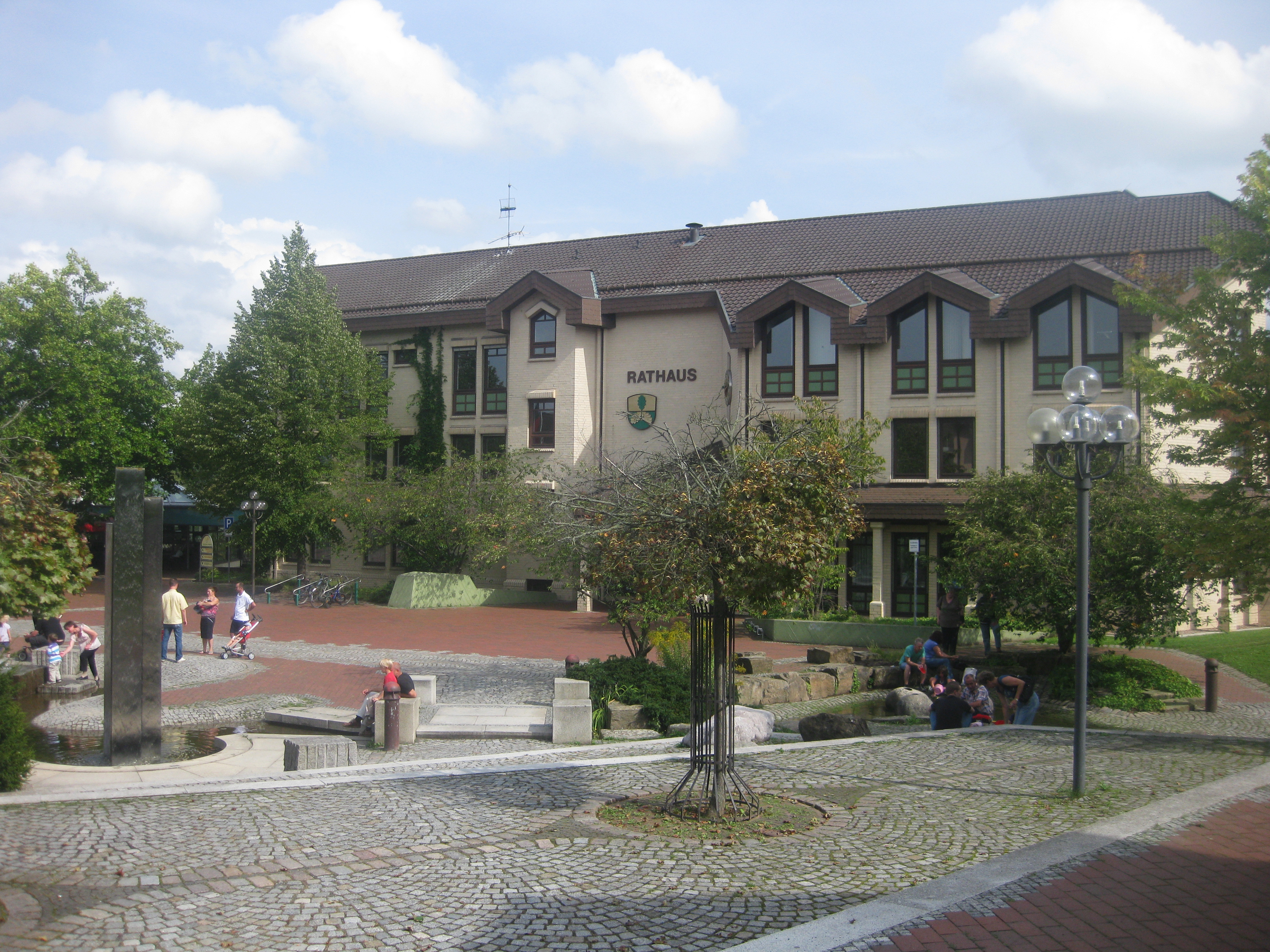
- Town hall

- Coat of arms

- Location of Lohfelden within Kassel district
- Interactive map of Lohfelden
- Location within Germany Location within Hesse
- Coordinates: 51°16′N 09°32′E
- Country: Germany
- State: Hesse
- Admin. region: Kassel
- District: Kassel

Government
  - Mayor (2022–28): Uwe Jäger (SPD)

Area
  - Total: 16.57 km^{2} (6.40 sq mi)
- Elevation: 210 m (690 ft)

Population (2025-12-31)
  - Total: 13,887
  - Density: 838.1/km^{2} (2,171/sq mi)
- Time zone: UTC+01:00 (CET)
  - Summer (DST): UTC+02:00 (CEST)
- Postal codes: 34253
- Dialling codes: 0561, 05608
- Vehicle registration: KS
- Website: www.lohfelden.de

Lohfelden is a municipality in the district of Kassel, in Hesse, Germany. It is situated 6 km southeast of Kassel. It has three parts Crumbach, Ochshausen and the former independent Vollmarshausen.

== Geography ==
Lohfelden / Vollmarshausen borders in the northwest to the independent city of Kassel, in the northeast and east to the municipality Kaufungen, in the south with the municipality Söhrewald, in the west with the municipality Fuldabrück (all three in the district of Kassel).

== History ==
The monastery of St. Alban in Mainz received rights in Crumbach in the 14th and 15th century.

The farmers in the three villages were mostly part-time farmers and since the beginning of the 19th century they had workshops in which they produced parts for the new industries of Kassel. The Brothers Grimm visited the three villages in the 1820s, a drawing by Ludwig Emil Grimm from 1821 shows the late summer in Crumbach, another drawing the church of Vollmarshausen. Around 1850 many people were employed regularly in the industries of Kassel, in 1912 the Söhrebahn-rail as a connection to the town was built.

A new settlement (called "Die Siedlung") between the villages Crumbach and Ochsenhausen was planned in 1919 and realized partially in the late 1930s by the architect Hannsgeorg Oechler. The architecture combines elements of a garden town with some neoclassic citations. On 1 June 1941, merged the two communities Crumbach and Ochsenhausen to the new community of Lohfelden. In the area of the municipality, at the former airfield Kassel-Waldau stood the aircraft industry Fieseler, known for the construction of the Fieseler Storch. The factory was badly damaged in World War II and never rebuilt, while the village of Vollmarshausen remained completely undamaged.

The complete population was traditionally Protestant. This changed after 1945 with refugees and workers from other parts of Germany and Europe, today there exists also a large catholic community. Individual motor car traffic made the Söhrebahn-rail obsolete, the operation ended in 1966. The track was converted later into a walking and cycle path.

On 1 December 1970 with the local government reform the former independent Vollmarshausen was added. The new Town Hall was built between the previous Lohfelden and Vollmarshausen. Kassel tried to incorporate the rich suburb and contacted the ministry of interior of the state of Hesse. In 1975 the incorporation failed after the resistance of the citizens of Lohfelden, but the community had to cede some boundaries to Kassel. Both cities made a treaty of cooperation they built together industrial areas, and for 30 years Lohfelden get the mayority of local taxes (today they are shared).

== Main sights ==
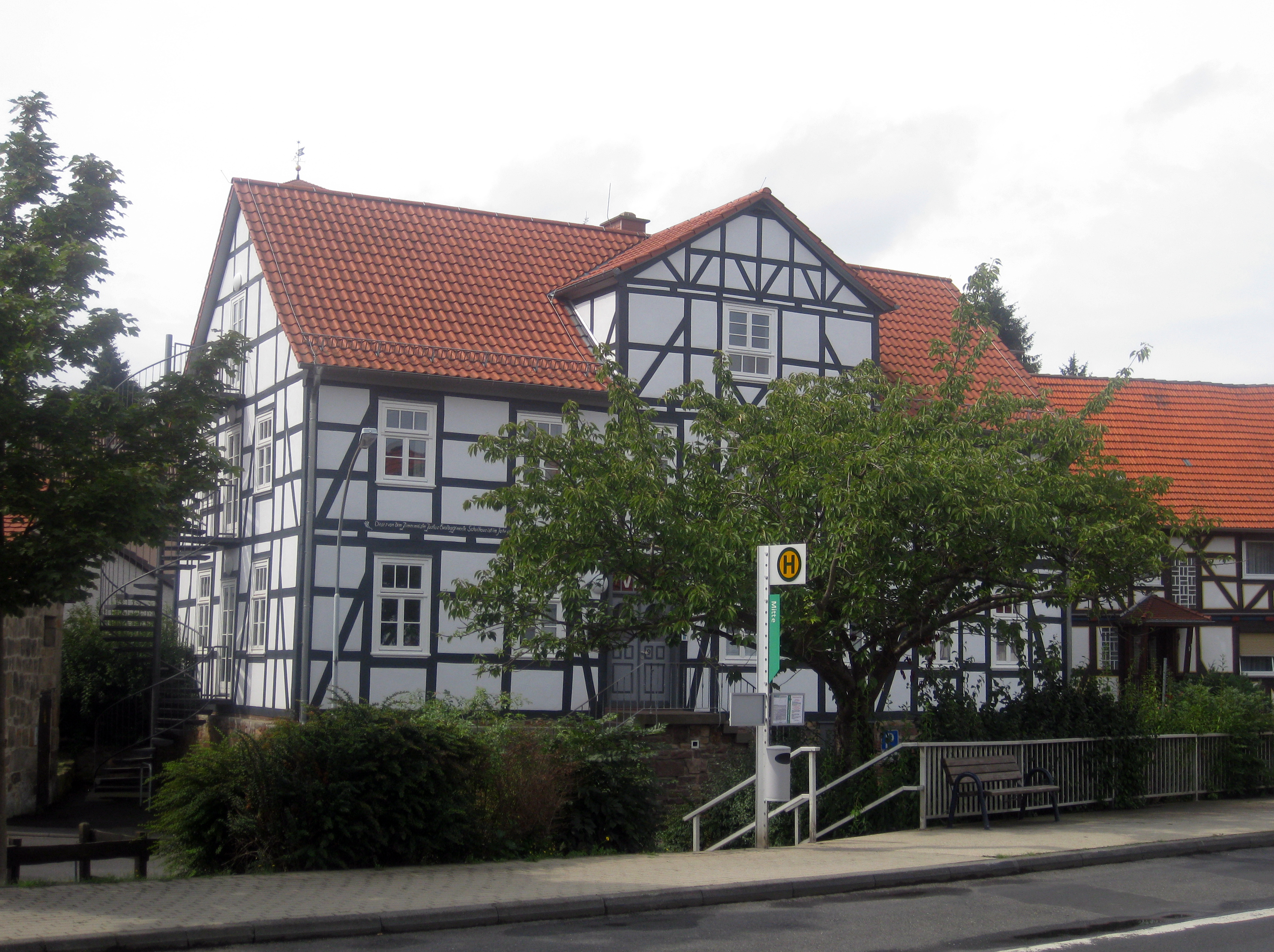
Especially Vollmarshausen is dominated by timber-framed buildings of the late 18th and early 19th century

- Carriages and Coaches Museum of Hessen (Museum Hessisches Kutschen- und Wagenmuseum) - closed
- Protestant church in Crumbach (with a round tower from the 12th century)
- Protestant church in Ochshausen (gothic style)
- Protestant church in Vollmarshausen (early sample of neoclassicism)
- basswood tree at the old square (and former court place) of Vollmarshausen
- Bronze Age tombs near Vollmarshausen
- Old mill Obermühle
- Garden town Siedlung

Source: Eco Pfad Kulturgeschichte Lohfelden

== Infrastructure ==
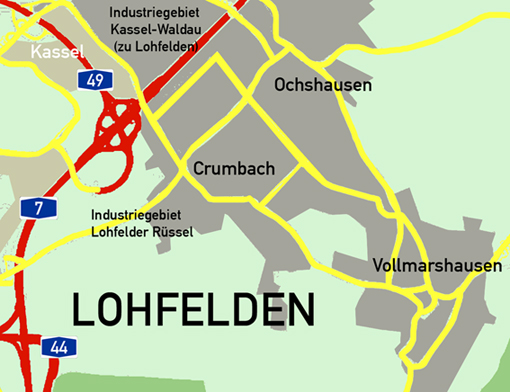
Location of the communal divisions

=== Schools and sports ===
Lohfelden has two primary schools, five kindergartens, two nurseries and a nursing home; also four gyms and two football stadiums.

The soccer division of the FSC Lohfelden once played in the Hessenliga. The local stadium is called Nordhessenstadion.

=== Business parks ===
In 1971, Lohfelden developed the business park Kassel-Waldau together with Kassel. A second business park with the name Lohfeldener Rüssel followed in 2009 also together with Kassel. It is well known for the service area with the same name on the autobahn.

== Twin towns – sister cities ==
Lohfelden twinned with, or has sister city relationships with:

- Berg im Drautal, Austria, since 1988
- Trutnov, Czech Republic, since 2007
- Alcalá la Real, Spain
