= Bielstein (Kaufungen Forest) =

Coordinates: 51°15′01″N 9°39′35″E

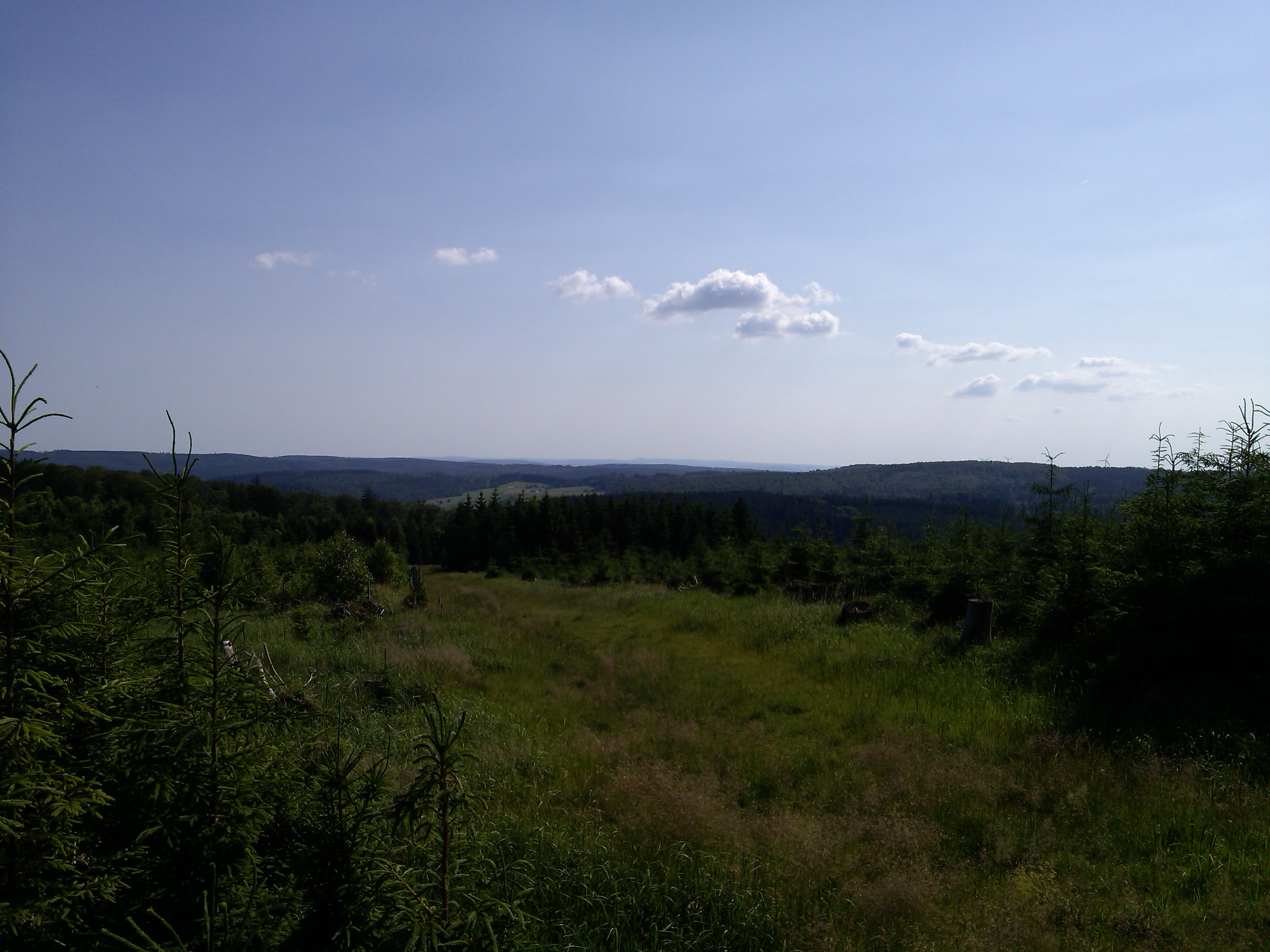

Highest point
- Elevation: 527.8 m (1,732 ft)

Geography
- Location: Hesse, Germany

The Bielstein is a hill in Hesse, Germany.
