= Guxhagen =

- Municipality
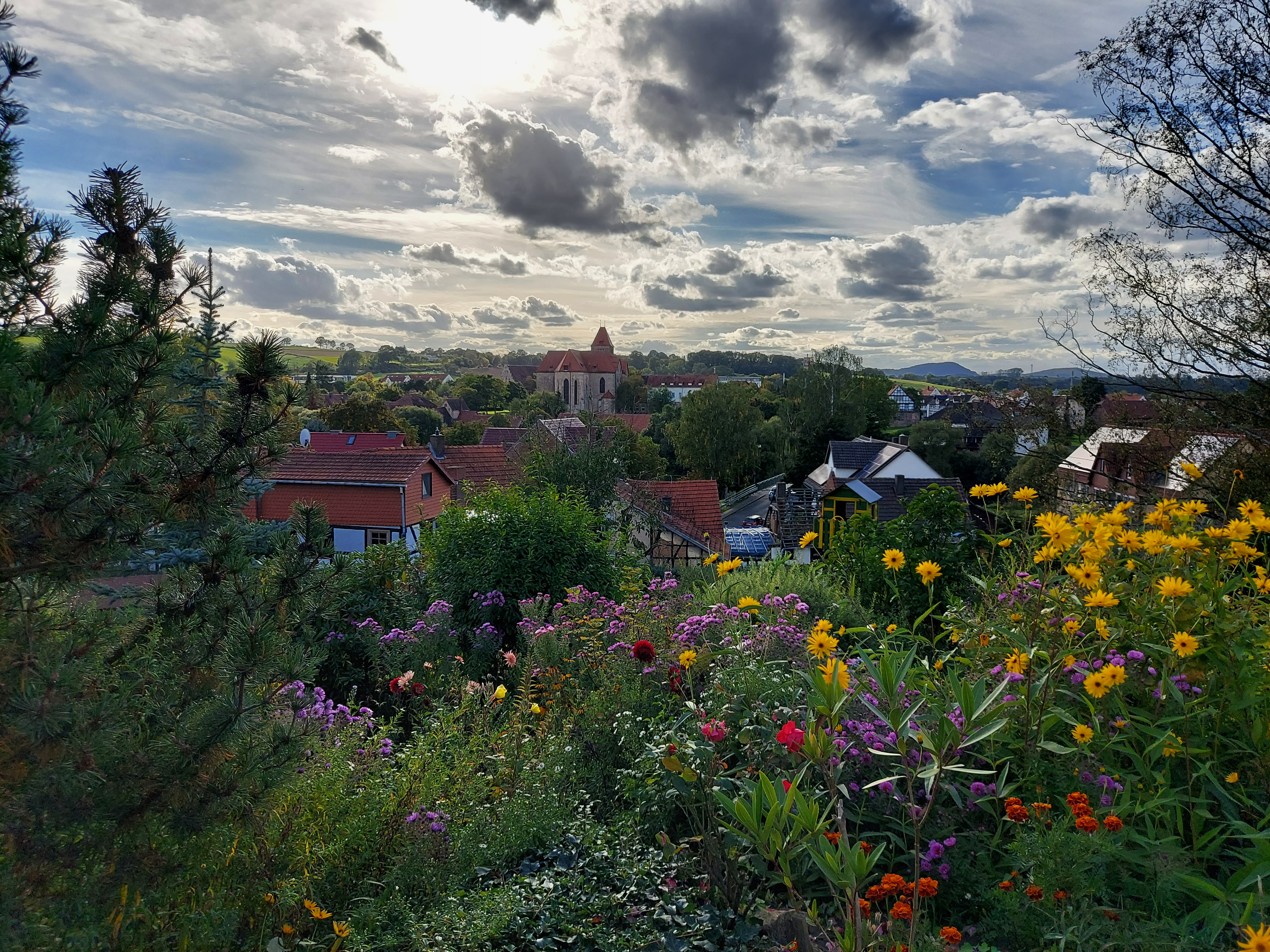

- Coat of arms

- Location of Guxhagen within Schwalm-Eder-Kreis district
- Interactive map of Guxhagen
- Location within Germany Location within Hesse
- Coordinates: 51°12′N 09°29′E
- Country: Germany
- State: Hesse
- Admin. region: Kassel
- District: Schwalm-Eder-Kreis

Government
  - Mayor (2020–26): Susanne Schneider (Ind.)

Area
  - Total: 26.25 km^{2} (10.14 sq mi)
- Elevation: 225 m (738 ft)

Population (2025-12-31)
  - Total: 5,279
  - Density: 201.1/km^{2} (520.9/sq mi)
- Time zone: UTC+01:00 (CET)
  - Summer (DST): UTC+02:00 (CEST)
- Postal codes: 34302
- Dialling codes: 05665
- Vehicle registration: HR, FZ, MEG, ZIG
- Website: www.guxhagen.de

Guxhagen is a municipality in Schwalm-Eder district in northern Hesse, Germany.

== Geography ==
Guxhagen lies about 15 km south of Kassel between the Habichtswald Nature Park and the Meißner-Kaufunger Wald Nature Park on the river Fulda. It neighbors Edermünde, Felsberg, Fuldabrück and Körle. The community consists of the six centers of Albshausen, Büchenwerra, Ellenberg, Grebenau, Guxhagen and Wollrode.

== History ==
The earliest archaeological finds for the area are two menhirs from 1180 BC.

A settlement developed around the monastery in Breitenau, which was founded in 1119 and dissolved in 1527. The church is still in use as a church, other buildings were repurposed through the centuries. Changing uses and repeated damages by war and conflicts led to alterations and rebuilding of the area through the centuries.

The village of Guxhagen itself was first documented in 1352 under the name Kukushayn. Upon the closing of the monastery in 1527, the village was recognised as independent.

The village suffered damages from the 30 Years War in 1626, and again in the 7 Years war between 1756 and 1763.

From 1845 till 1848, the first railway from Kassel to Bebra was built, bringing a direct connection from Guxhagen to the wider area. This allowed for economic growth, and led to an increase of population in Guxhagen.

Between 1933 and 1945, the old monastery was used as a Concentration Camp. Upon the arrival of American troops in 1945, 28 prisoners were killed by the Gestapo. A memorial and a museum exhibit serve as reminders.

After the 2nd World War, bridges and streets were rebuilt. The new school was opened in 1964.

In the mid of the 20th century, an Autobahn connection was built.

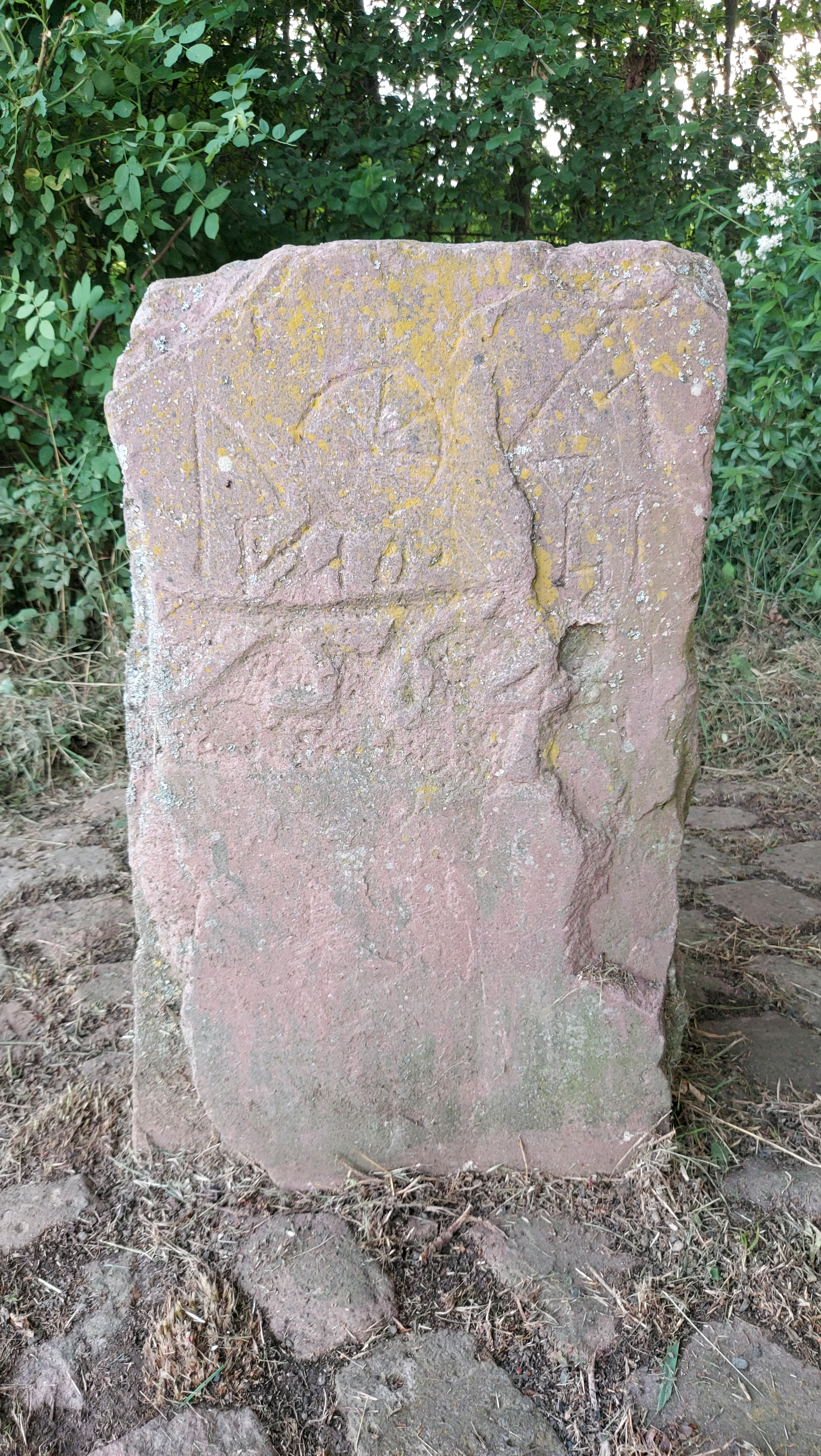
Märkerstein from 1564, depicting agricultural items

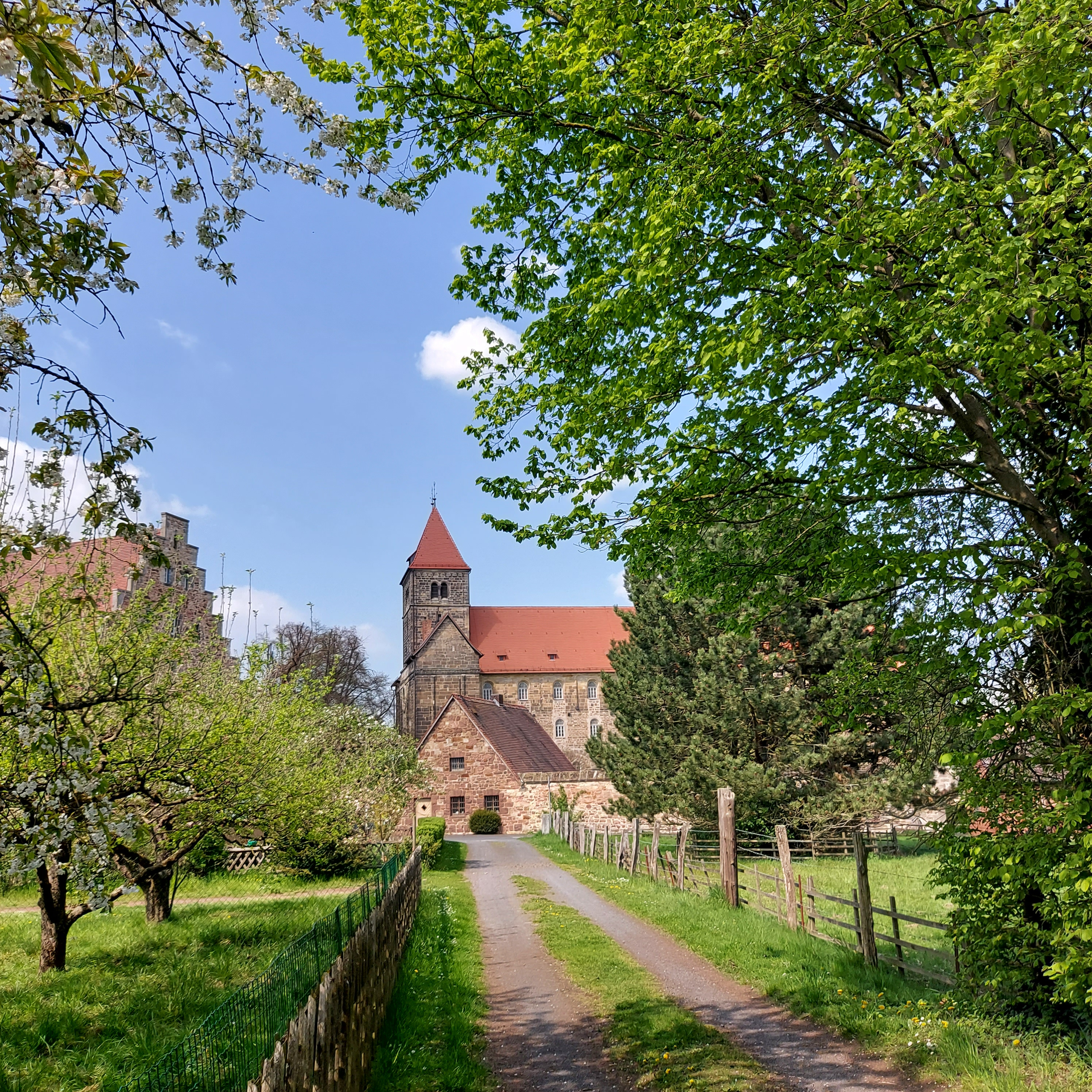
Breitenau Monastery and museum

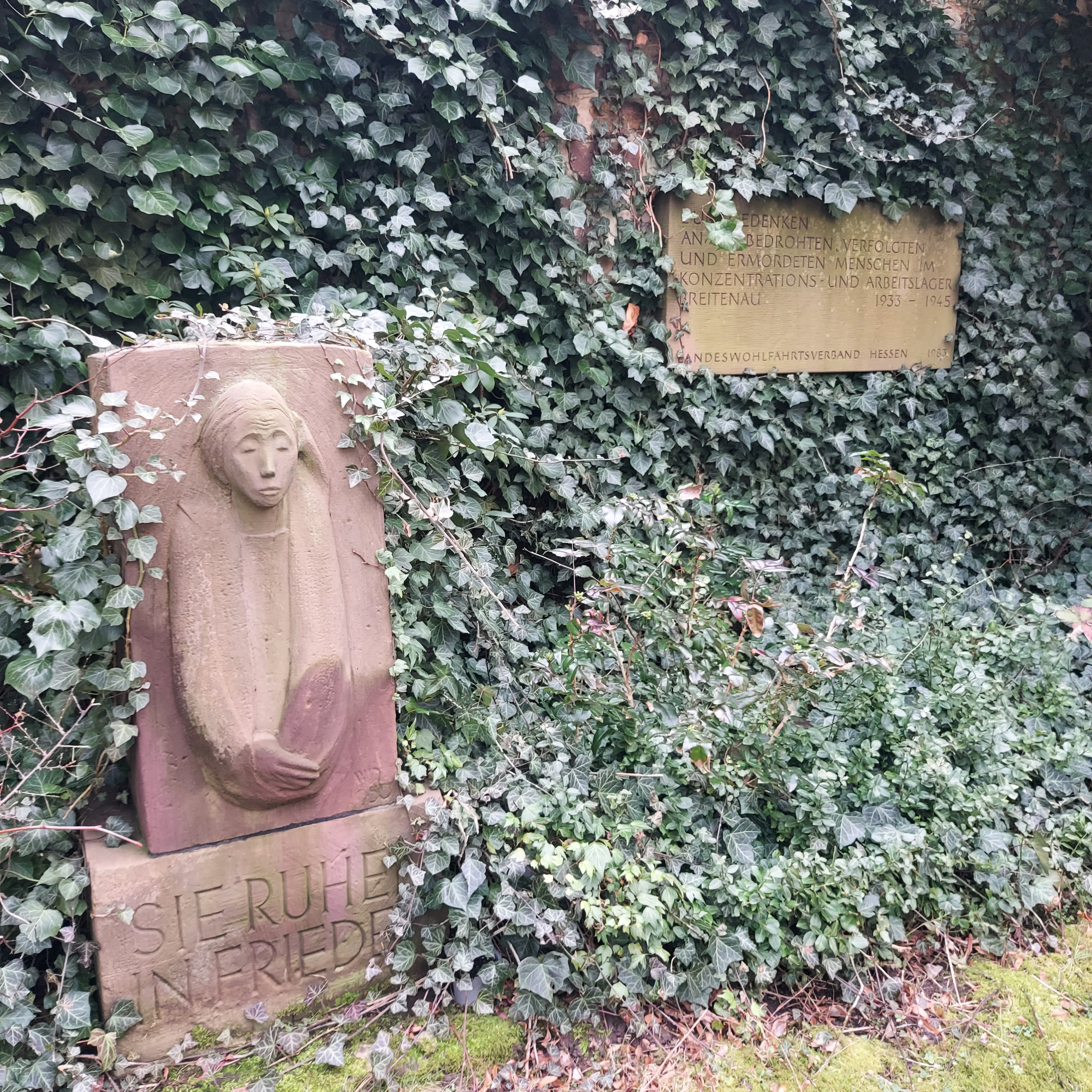
memorial for the KZ

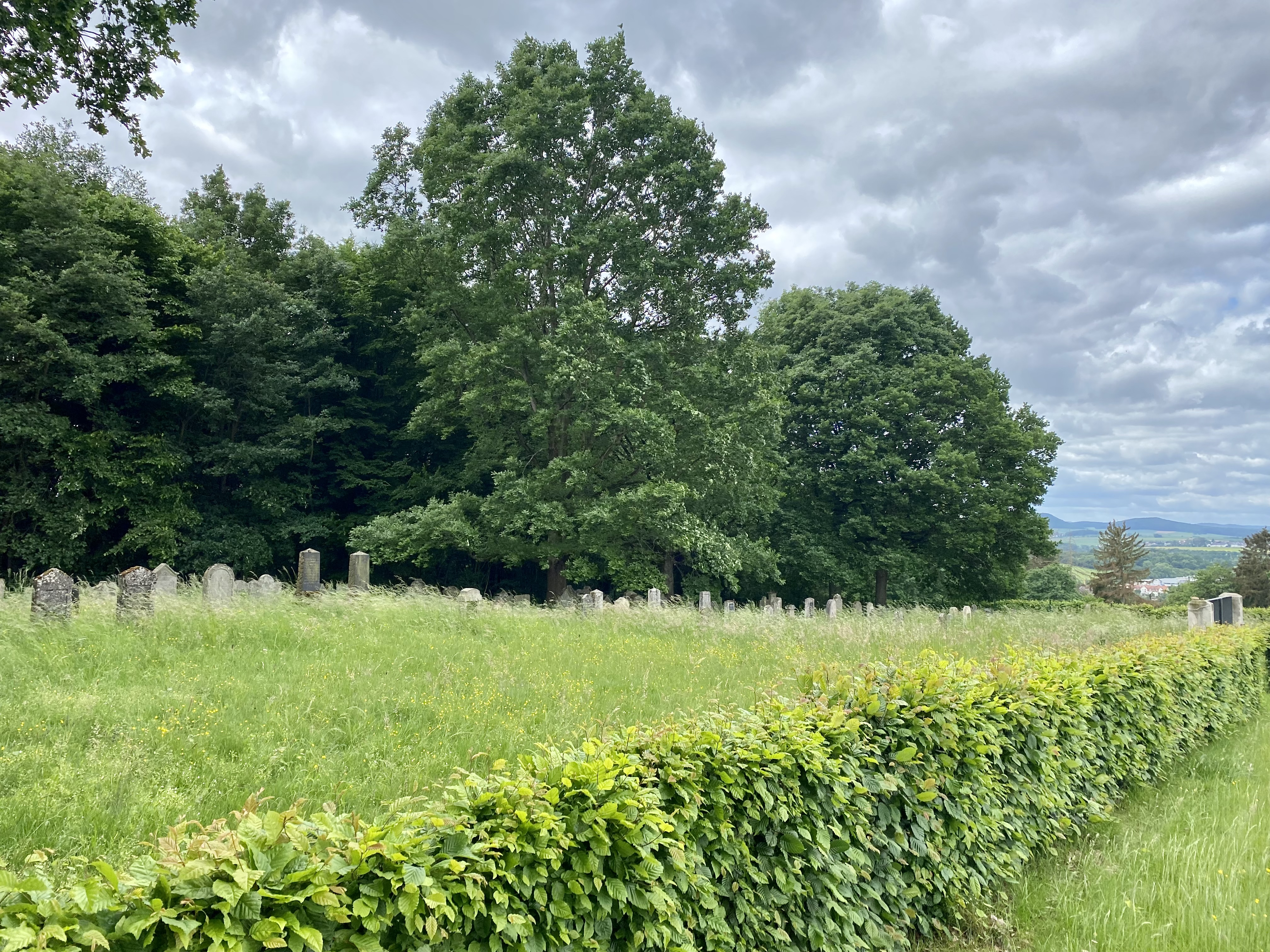
Jewish graveyard

=== Jewish life in Guxhagen ===
From 1664-1941, there were Jewish families living in Guxhagen who formed their own community and built a synagogue and school. After the events at the Kristallnacht pogrom of 1938, the number of community members decreased to 64 in 1939 (3.3% of 1,919). In connection with the November pogrom, eleven Jewish men and a boy were arrested and brought to Breitenau concentration camp. After this event, many Jews left. During The Holocaust the rest of Jews were deported to concentration camps and most of them died. Today, the old synagogue is used for cultural and memorial events.

== Politics ==
=== Municipal council ===
Municipal council is made up of 31 members, led by the mayor Susanne Schneider.

- SPD 14 seats
- Gemeinschaftsliste Guxhagen ("community list") 9 seats
- CDU 4 seats
- Greens 4 seats

(as of municipal elections held in 2021)

== Economy and infrastructure ==
=== Transport ===
Guxhagen lies on Federal Highway (Bundesstraße) B 83 and Autobahn A 7 (Kassel – Bad Hersfeld).

The community belongs to the North Hesse Transport Network, which among other things runs a hailed shared taxi within the greater community and offers local train connections.

Guxhagen is part of the German Cycling Network (Route 9).

=== Economy ===
Main employers are the schools, a Sartorius AG site, and tourism-related business.

==== Parts of the Municipality ====
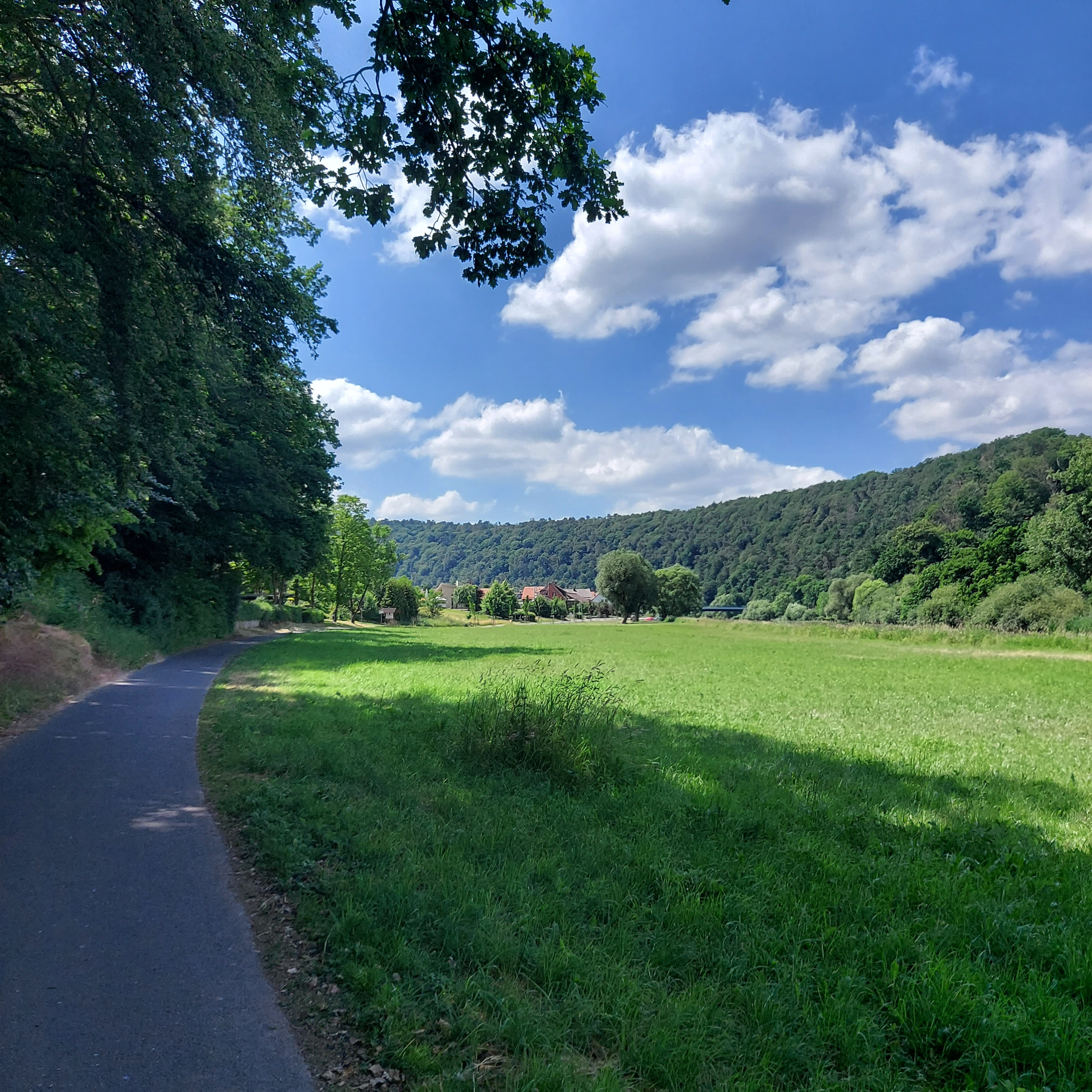
Büchenwerra

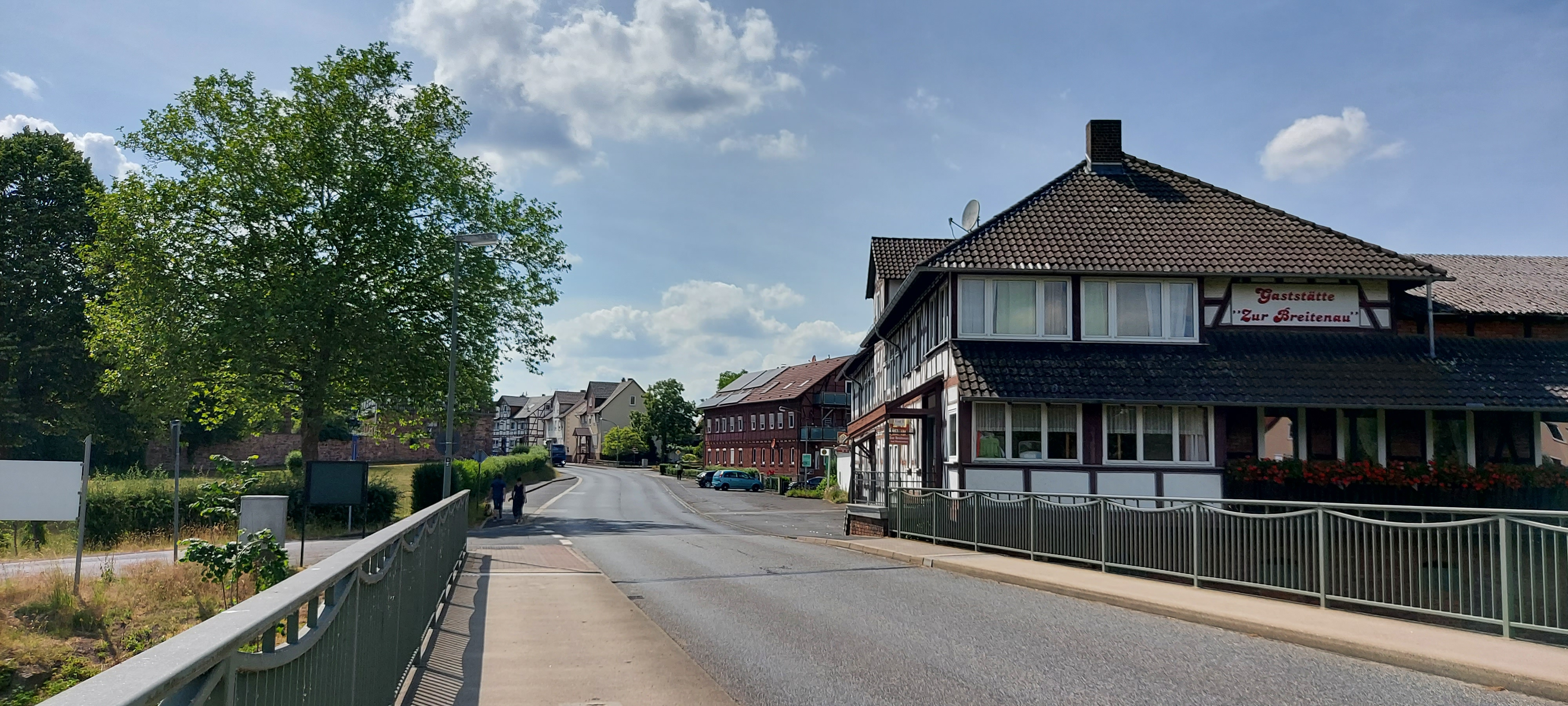
Breitenau

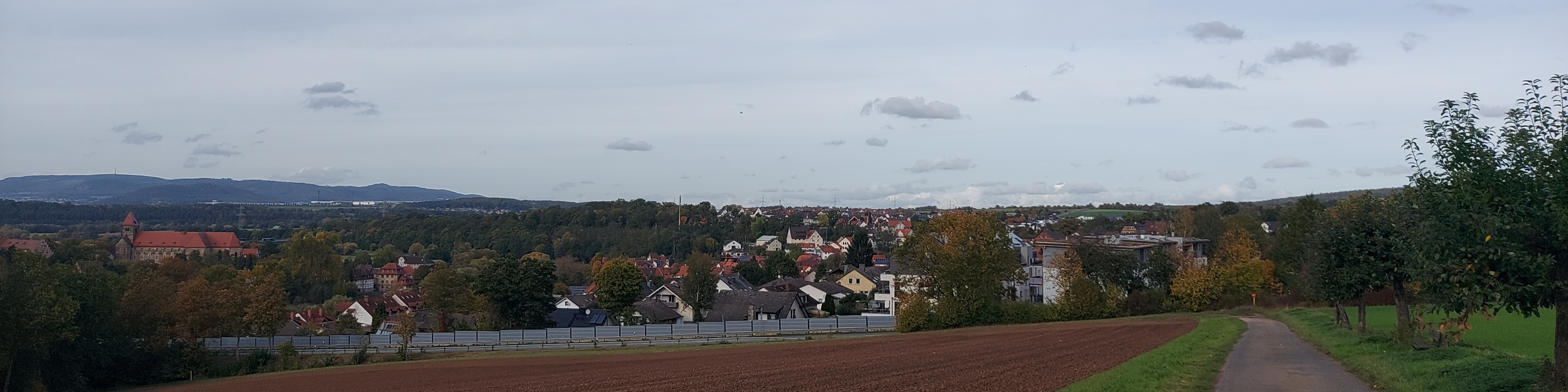
Guxhagen

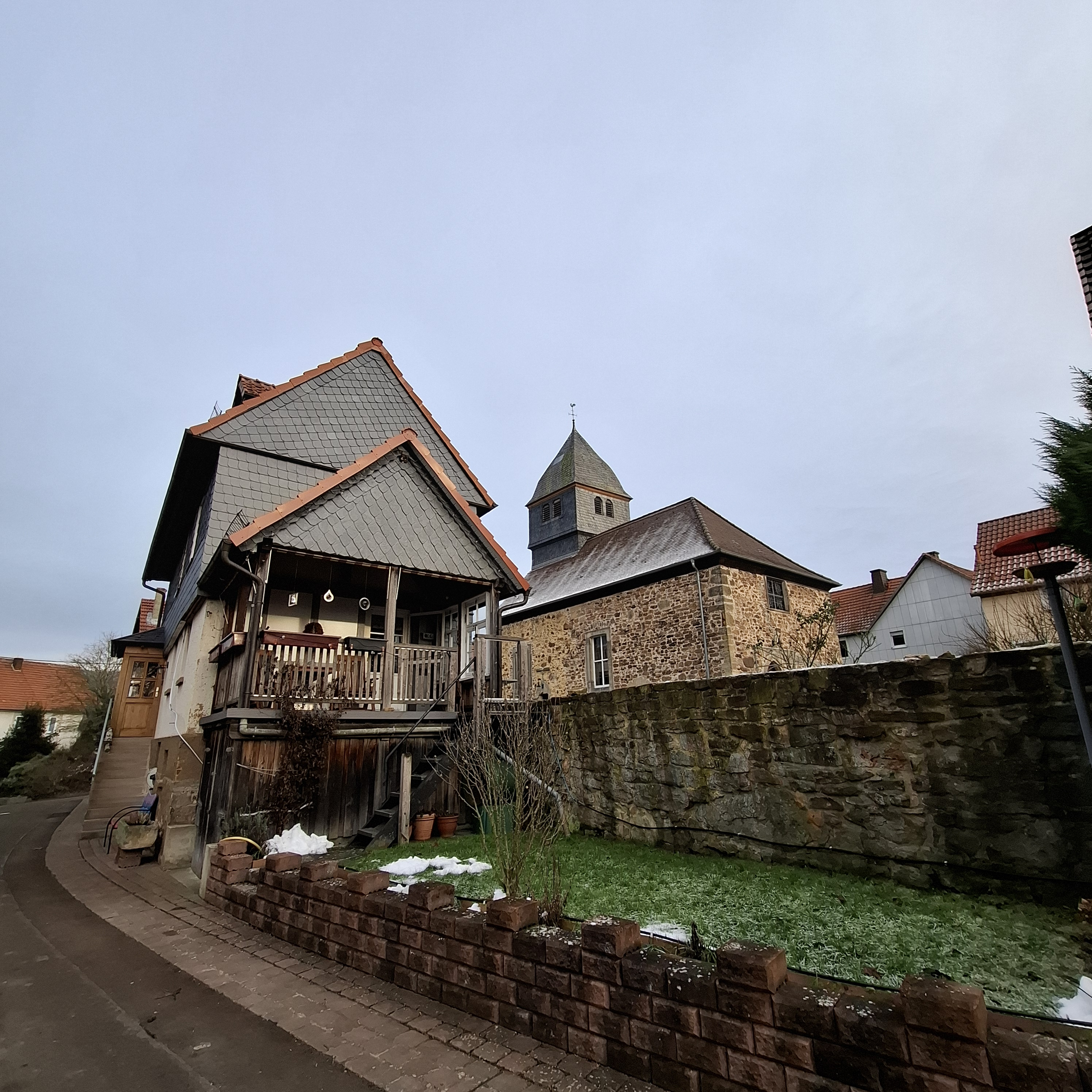
Wollrode

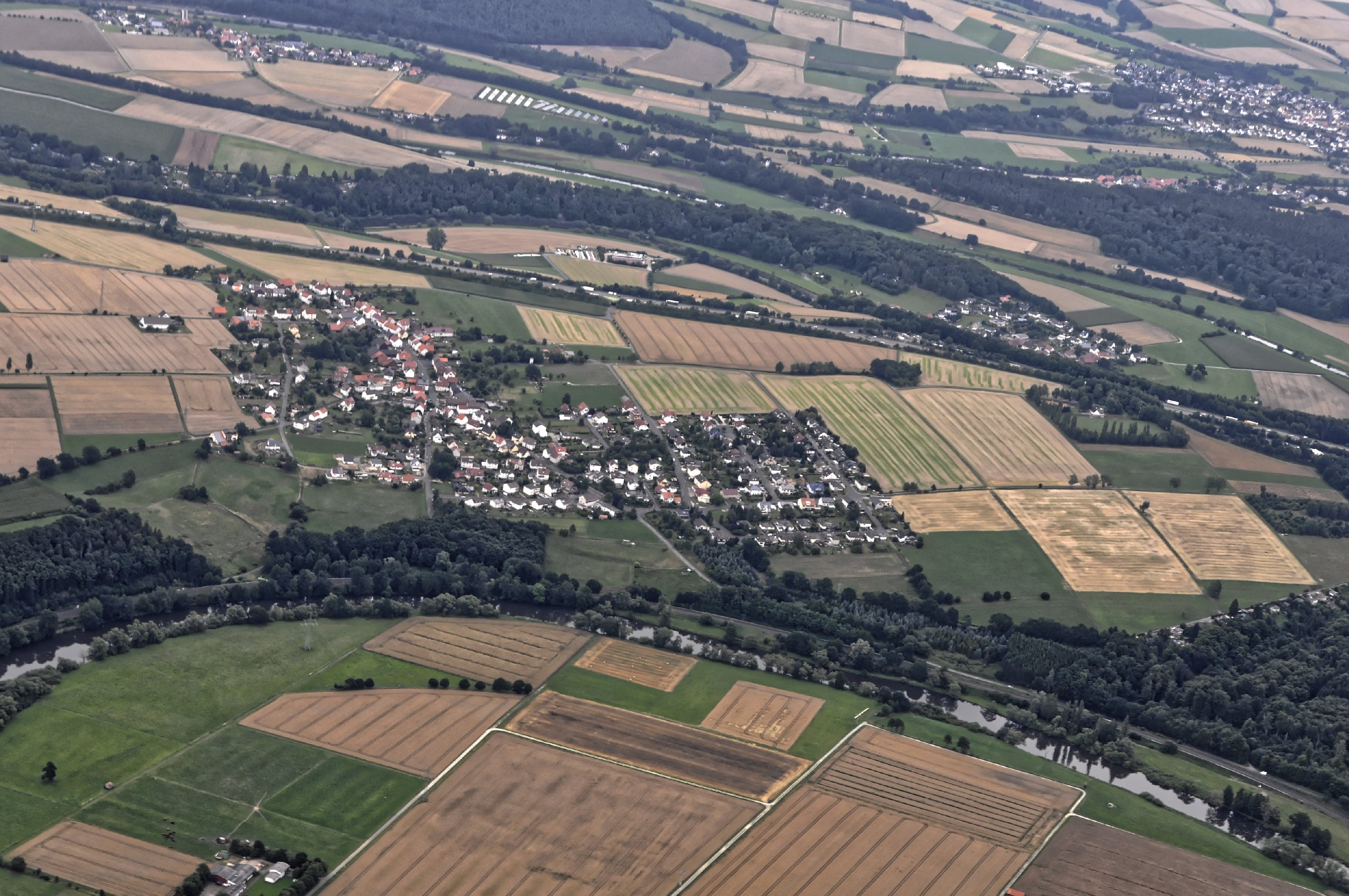
Ellenberg

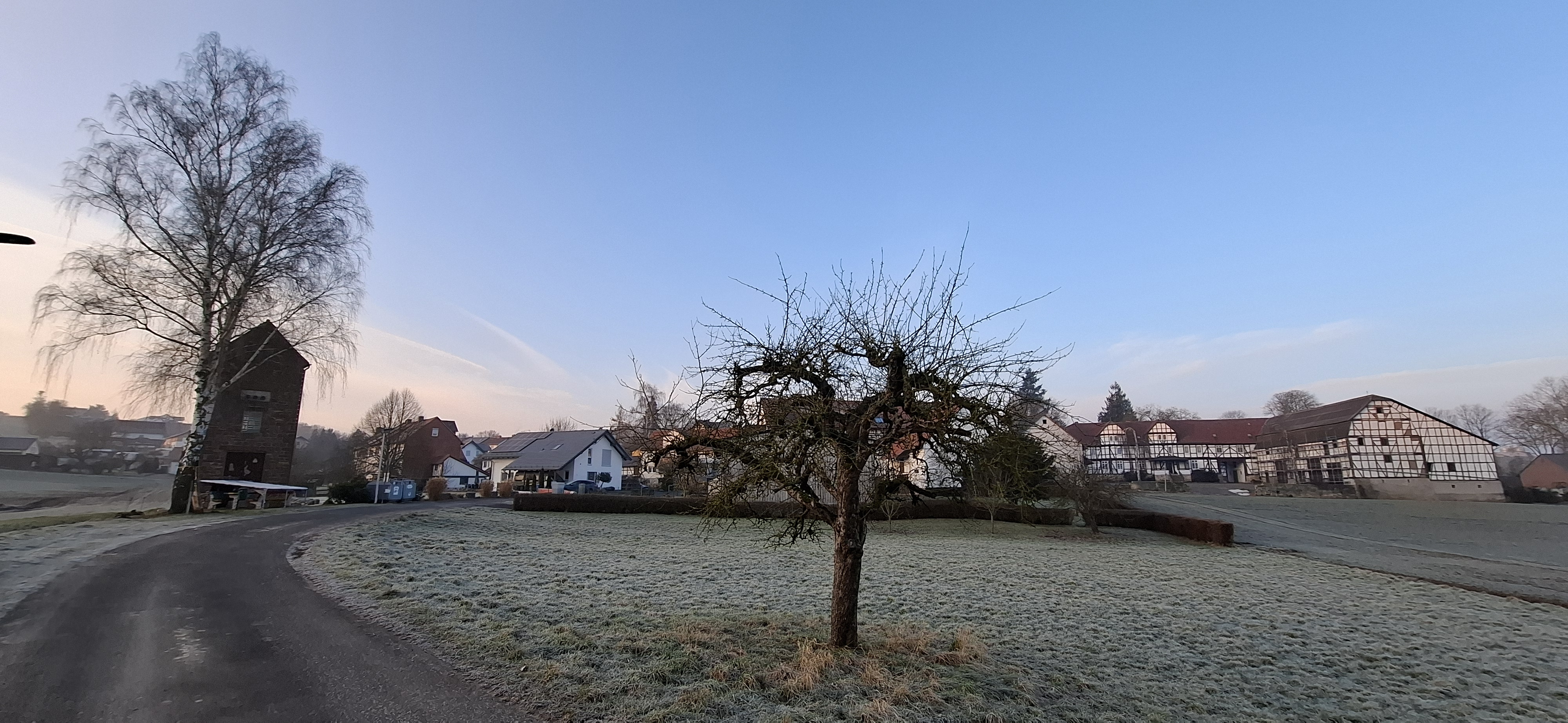
Albshausen

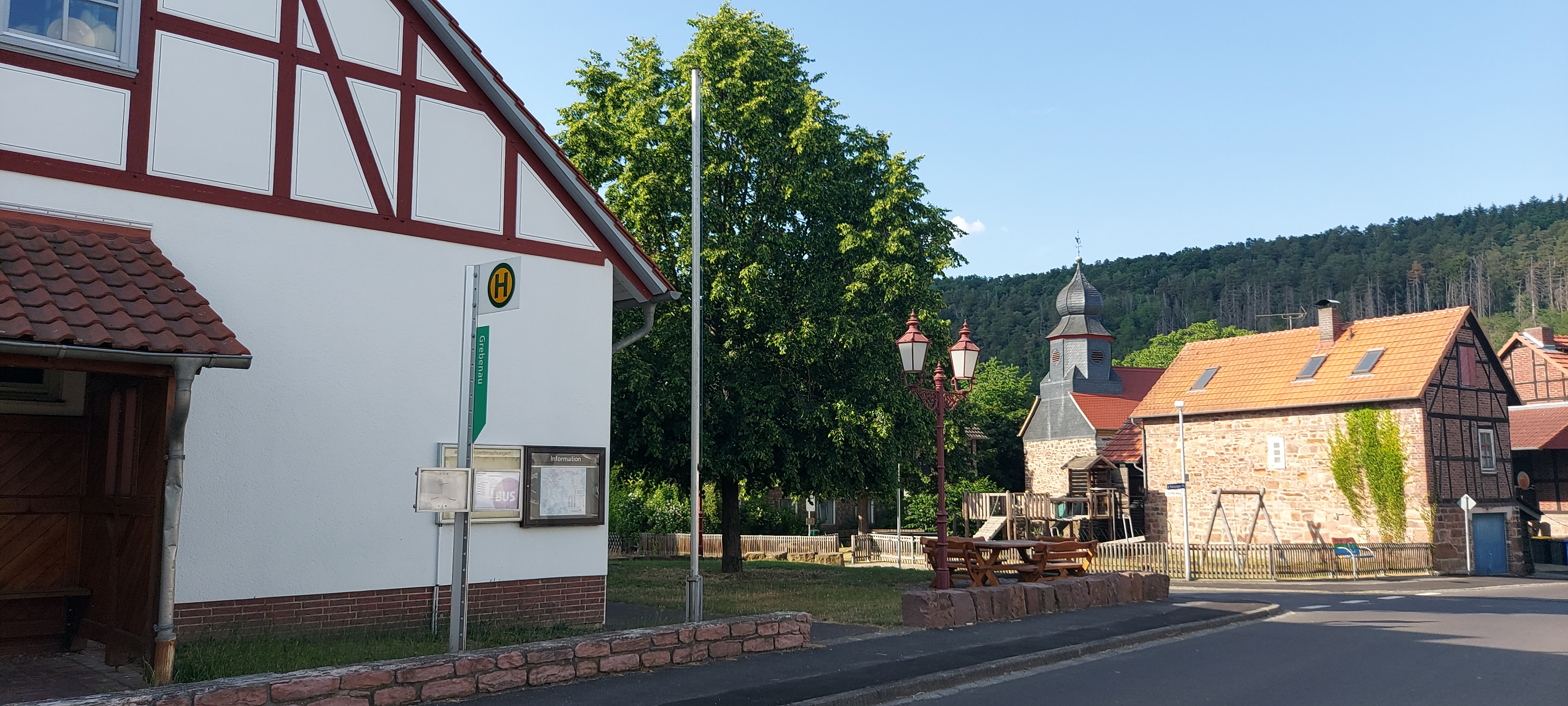
Grebenau

== Personalities ==
- Karl Glinzer (painter)
- Friedrich Paulus (general)
- Christoph Weber (librarian)
