= Körle =

- Municipality
- Coat of arms

- Location of Körle within Schwalm-Eder-Kreis district
- Interactive map of Körle
- Location within Germany Location within Hesse
- Coordinates: 51°10′N 09°31′E
- Country: Germany
- State: Hesse
- Admin. region: Kassel
- District: Schwalm-Eder-Kreis

Government
  - Mayor (2023–29): Mario Gerhold (SPD)

Area
  - Total: 17.51 km^{2} (6.76 sq mi)
- Elevation: 188 m (617 ft)

Population (2025-12-31)
  - Total: 3,093
  - Density: 176.6/km^{2} (457.5/sq mi)
- Time zone: UTC+01:00 (CET)
  - Summer (DST): UTC+02:00 (CEST)
- Postal codes: 34327
- Dialling codes: 05665
- Vehicle registration: HR
- Website: www.koerle.de

Körle is a municipality in the Schwalm-Eder district in Hesse, Germany. It lies about 20 km south of Kassel near the turn-off for Guxhagen on Autobahn A 7.

== History ==
Körle was first mentioned in 1074 in a donation document from the Fulda monastery.

The community, as it is now, came into being as part of Hesse's municipal reforms, when the communities of Empfershausen, Lobenhausen and Wagenfurth were amalgamated with Körle on 1 February 1971.

== Partnership ==
The community of Körle has maintained since 1991 a partnership with Floh-Seligenthal in Thuringia.
