= Kaufungen Forest =

Hill range in Germany

Coordinates: 51°14′44″N 9°45′19″E

The Kaufungen Forest (German: Kaufunger Wald) is a range of steep, wooded hills straddling the border between the states of Hesse and Lower Saxony in central Germany. It takes its name from the town Kaufungen.

The hills lie in the fork of the Rivers Fulda and Werra, which meet at Hannoversch Münden just to the north. They are bounded to the west and north-west by the Fulda valley, and to the east and north-east by the Werra valley. The southern boundary is less clearly defined, as the range merges into the gentler hills of the Söhrewald to the south-west, and climbs towards the high plateau of the Hoher Meißner to the south-east.

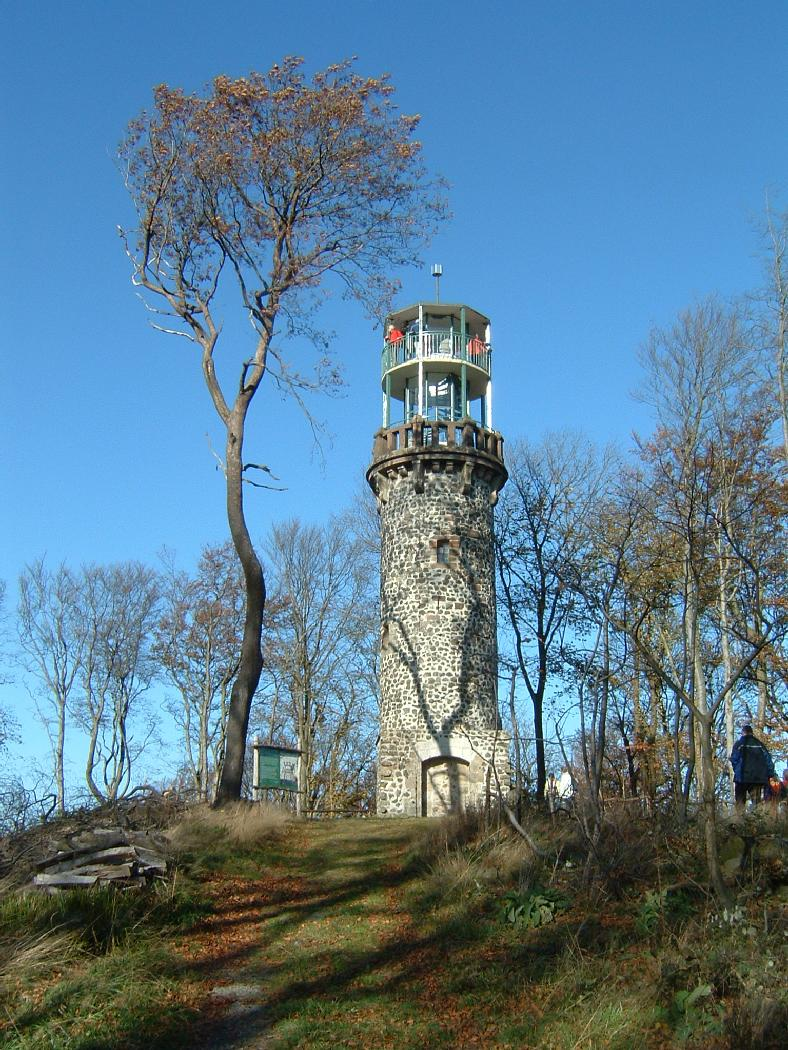
Bilstein Tower

The highest natural point is 643 m (2,110 ft) Hirschberg; however the 641 m (2,103 ft) summit of Bilstein forms a much better natural viewpoint, and since 1869 has been crowned with an observation tower. The present tower was erected in 1889 and extended to its present height of 20 m (66 ft) in 1960; it offers panoramic views across the region. Other peaks include Mühlenstein (607 m (1,991 ft)), Haferberg (581 m (1,906 ft)), Langenberg (565 m (1,854 ft)), Großer Steinberg (542 m (1,778 ft)) and Kleiner Steinberg (542 m (1,778 ft)).

The area is popular for walking and especially for cycling; an extensive network of waymarked forestry and agricultural tracks provide excellent traffic-free routes. The annual Bilstein Bike Marathon attracts hundreds of mountain bikers to compete in races of varying length and difficulty. In winter, the same trails are used for cross-country skiing. The main tourist centre for the area is the small town of Großalmerode. Other settlements include Kaufungen (which lends its name to the range), Helsa and Nieste. The larger towns of Kassel, Witzenhausen and Hessisch Lichtenau lie on the western, eastern and southern fringes respectively.

The entire of the area enjoys protected status; the hills in Hesse form part of the Meißner-Kaufungen Forest Nature Park, while those in Lower Saxony belong to the Münden Nature Park. However, the southern part of the range may be affected by the planned extension of the A 44 autobahn from its present end in Kassel to Eisenach. The controversial extension, which has been delayed and rerouted several times on environmental grounds, is part of a national strategy to improve communications between the east and west of Germany, in the wake of reunification.
