= Großalmerode =

- Town
- Coat of arms

- Location of Großalmerode within Werra-Meißner-Kreis district
- Interactive map of Großalmerode
- Location within Germany Location within Hesse
- Coordinates: 51°15′27″N 9°47′04″E
- Country: Germany
- State: Hesse
- Admin. region: Kassel
- District: Werra-Meißner-Kreis

Government
  - Mayor (2023–29): Finn Thomsen

Area
  - Total: 37.59 km^{2} (14.51 sq mi)
- Elevation: 421–643 m (1,381–2,110 ft)

Population (2025-12-31)
  - Total: 6,049
  - Density: 160.9/km^{2} (416.8/sq mi)
- Time zone: UTC+01:00 (CET)
  - Summer (DST): UTC+02:00 (CEST)
- Postal codes: 37247
- Dialling codes: 05604
- Vehicle registration: ESW
- Website: www.grossalmerode.de

Großalmerode (German pronunciation: [ˌɡʁoːsʔalməˈʁoːdə]; or Grossalmerode) is a town in the Werra-Meißner-Kreis in Hesse, Germany.

== Geography ==
=== Location ===
The small town, which has had town rights since 1775, lies 21 km east of Kassel in the Meißner-Kaufunger Wald Nature Park on the river Gelster. Here the constituent community of Laudenbach can also be found, in the Kaufunger Wald (range) between the Steinberg or Bilstein in the northwest and the Hirschberg in the southwest. Not far to the southeast stands the highest mountain in northeast Hesse, the Hoher Meißner.

=== Neighbouring communities ===
These are Witzenhausen, Hessisch Lichtenau, Helsa, Bad Sooden-Allendorf and Berkatal.

=== Constituent communities ===
Großalmerode’s Ortsteile are Weißenbach, Trubenhausen, Uengsterode, Rommerode, Laudenbach and Epterode. Also within town limits are Bransrode, Gut Giesenhagen and Faulbach, although these are not outlying centres, but rather officially parts of the main town.

== History ==
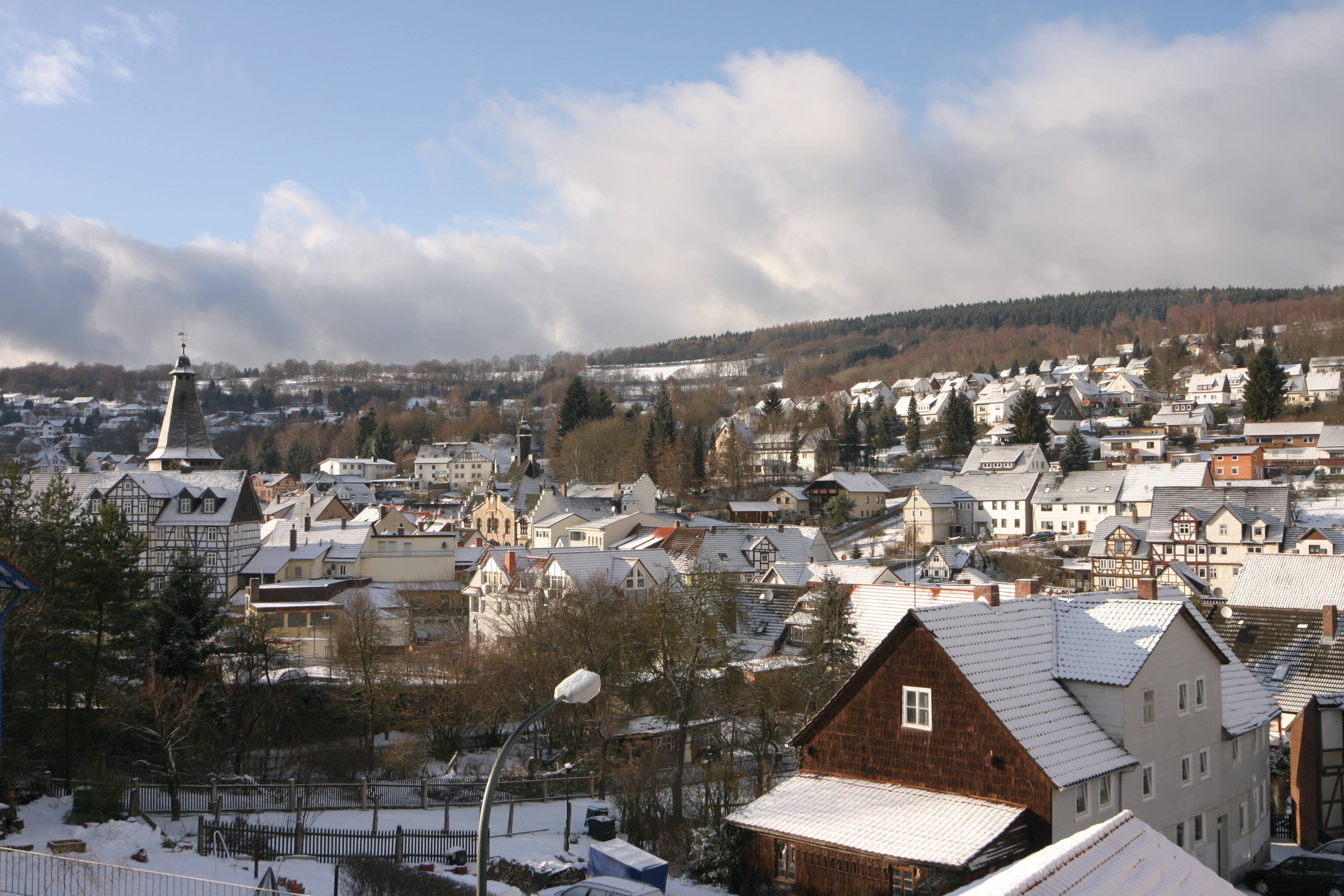
View of Großalmerode towards the northwest

In 1386, today’s Großalmerode had its first documentary mention as Almerode. Town rights, though, only came in 1775.

Ceramics manufacture in mediaeval Großalmerode was very advanced. The products (Hessian crucible) were exported worldwide for their high resistance to heat (1 100 to 1 200 °C).

At a gathering of the Christian Gemeinschaftsbewegung (“Fellowship Movement”) in 1907 there were ecstatic phenomena, the condemnation of which led to a rift between the Gemeinschaftsbewegung and the Pentecostal movement in 1909, through the so-called Berlin Declaration.

== Politics ==
=== Town council ===
The 31-seat Stadtverordnetenversammlung was constituted after the municipal election held on 14 March 2021, in which the Wählergemeinschaft Großalmerode (WG) held 15 seats, the SPD 12 seats, and the CDU 4 seats. The most recent municipal election, held on 15 March 2026, produced an identical seat distribution.

| Parties and voter communities | | % 2026 | Seats 2026 | % 2021 | Seats 2021 |
| CDU | Christian Democratic Union of Germany | 11.2 | 4 | — | 4 |
| SPD | Social Democratic Party of Germany | 39.8 | 12 | — | 12 |
| WG | Wählergemeinschaft Großalmerode | 49.0 | 15 | 49.2 | 15 |
| Total | | 100.0 | 31 | 100.0 | 31 |
| Voter turnout in % | | 55.63 | | 51.04 | |

=== Mayor ===
From 2000 to 2017, Andreas Nickel (SPD) has been the town’s mayor.Finn Thomsen (parteilos) was elected mayor in September 2017 in the first round of voting. He was re-elected in October 2023 and inaugurated into his second term in March 2024.

=== Coat of arms ===
The town’s arms might be described thus: Argent a mound vert, thereon three crucibles gules, one on top of the others, between two piles of Üller azure.

Üller which are made of Almerode clay, like the crucibles, are somewhat like marbles, but often much bigger.

=== Town partnerships ===
- Royston, Hertfordshire, England, United Kingdom

== Culture and sightseeing ==
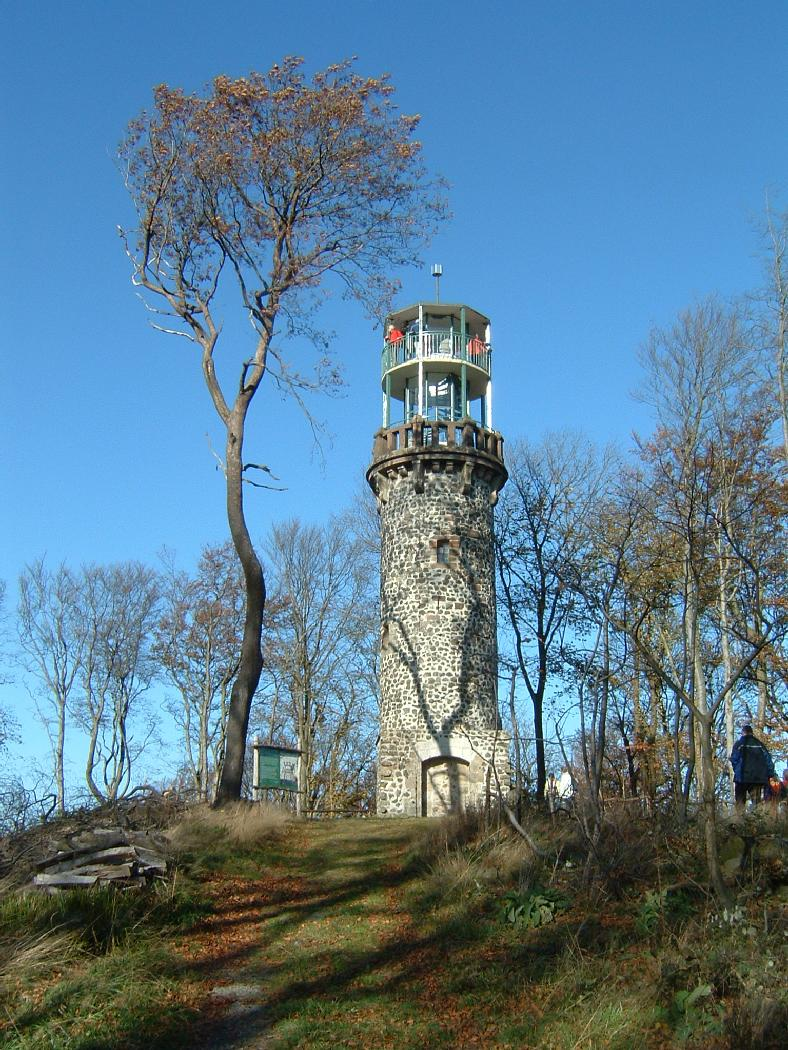
Bilsteinturm

=== Museums ===
- Glass and Ceramics Museum

=== Buildings ===
- Bilsteinturm (tower) on the Bilstein
- The Evangelical parish church represents an architectural mixture of Baroque Revival, Gothic Revival and later style elements. The nave was added in 1913 and 1914 to a Late Gothic quire.

=== Sport ===
With regard to sport, Großalmerode is well known for the 58 km-long mountain bike trail running across the Kaufunger Wald. Each year, with a few variations on the course, the so-called Bilstein Bike Marathon is held here, which draws mountain bikers from all over Germany and the Benelux countries to town. On the Schwarzenberg lies the TC Großalmerode tennis complex, with four courts.

Furthermore, the active members of the Turngemeinde 1863 Großalmerode e.V. (gymnastics club) and the FC Großalmerode 1920 Bezirksoberliga footballers have made names for themselves in past years. Between the main town and the outlying centre of Epterode lies the Männerspielplatz (“men’s playground”), where unusual sporting activities are on offer, such as digger driving, jeep driving and quad driving.

== Economy and infrastructure ==
=== Transport ===
Through the main town runs Bundesstraße 451, which leads to Bundesstraße 7 near Helsa and Bundesstraße 27 near Witzenhausen.

The railway line from Walburg to the Großalmerode Ost end-of-line station was opened on 15 December 1915. Passenger service was ended on 2 June 1973. After conversion, the trains ran farther along the Gelstertalbahn to Witzenhausen Süd and Eichenberg.

There was one other railway line that branched off at Velmeden from this line; it led to the Großalmerode West end-of-line station.

== Famous people ==
- Wilhelm Grimm, one of the Brothers Grimm, was confirmed on 13 April 1800 in Großalmerode.
- Heinrich Pforr was a painter. He was born on 26 October 1880 in Laudenbach. A street in Laudenbach has been named after him, on which his house still stands today.
- The poet Wilhelm Speck is an honorary citizen of the town and Wilhelm-Speck-Platz was named after him.
