= Gelster =

River in Germany

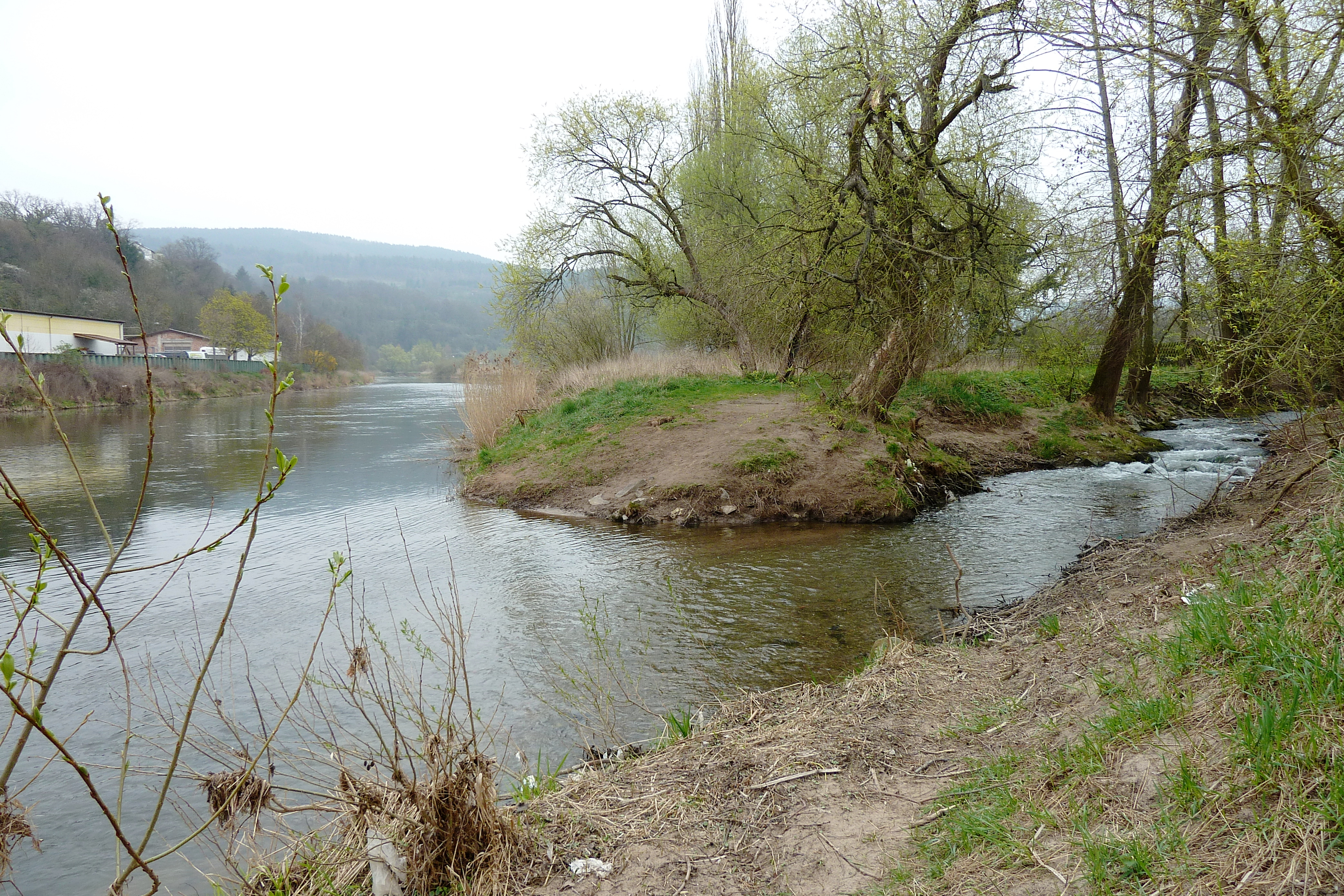
- Mouth of the Gelster (right) flowing into the Werra

Location
- Country: Germany
- State: Hesse

Physical characteristics
- Mouth
  - location: Werra
  - coordinates: 51.3460°N 9.8602°E
- Length: 17.4 km (10.8 mi)

Basin features
- Progression: Werra→ Weser→ North Sea

Gelster (German pronunciation: [ˈɡɛlstɐ]) is a river of Hesse, Germany. It flows into the Werra in Witzenhausen.

== See also ==
- List of rivers of Hesse
