= Langenberg (Habichtswald) =

Hill range in Germany

Langenberg / Langenberge
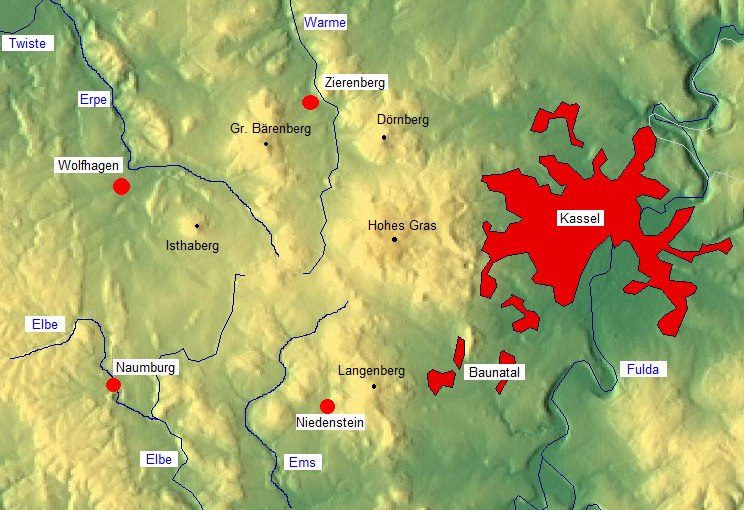
- Habichtswald Highlands with the Langenberg in the south

Highest point
- Peak: Schwengeberg
- Elevation: 556.7 m above NHN

Dimensions
- Area: 22 km^{2} (8.5 mi^{2})

Geography
- State(s): Kassel and Schwalm-Eder-Kreis; North Hesse (Germany)
- Range coordinates: 51°14′57″N 9°20′33″E
- Parent range: Habichtswald Highlands

Geology
- Orogeny: Central Uplands (Variscan)

The Langenberg (German pronunciation: [ˈlaŋənbɛʁk]), also colloquially called the Langenberge (plural) due to its several and widely spaced hilltops, is a hill range of the German Central Uplands which covers an area of over 22 km² and reaches a height of 556.7 m above sea level (NHN) at the Schwengeberg. It is a natural region in the Habichtswald Highlands in the counties of Kassel and Schwalm-Eder-Kreis in North Hesse.

The actual Langenberg itself is the hill chain that runs from the Saukopf south-southeast via the Schwengeberg, Laufskopf, Bensberg and Bilstein to the Kammerberg and forms the eastern watershed of the Eder tributary, the Ems at Bauna and the stream of Pilgerbach. In the eponymous natural region this crest line is flanked by woodland to the west and east, and in the southeast by the adjacent higher ground west of the Kassel Basin.

== Geography ==
=== Location ===
The Langenberg lies in the south of the Habichtswald Highlands. Its northern part is located in the county of Kassel and its southern part, the Gudensberg Forest (Gudensberger Wald), in the county of Schwalm-Eder-Kreis. In the Habichtswald Nature Park both parts extend west to southwest into the borough of Baunatal.

Northeast of the Langenberge, on the far side of the Hoofer Pforte and Schauenburg castle ruins (499.9 m) and the adjoining valley of the Bauna to the east, is the High Habichtswald (Hoher Habichtswald). Towards the east the land descends over the borough of Baunatal and along the lower courses of the Bauna to the River Fulda. To the southeast and south the terrain of the Langenberge descends via Gudensberg and Edermünde to the valley of the Eder; towards the southwest to the valley of the Eder tributary, the Ems, while in a northwesterly direction they flow seamlessly into the hilltops of the Hinterhabichtswald Kuppen. Immediately east of them and running further to the northwest is the Habichtswald Depression, clearly separated by the kuppen of the High Habichtswald.

=== Natural regions ===
The Langenberg forms a natural region of the same name (no. 342.02) within the major unit group, the West Hesse Highlands (No. 34), the major unit of the Habichtswald Highlands (342) and the sub-unit of the Habichtswald (including Langenberg) (342.0).

=== Hills ===
The highest point of the Langenberge is the Schwengeberg at 556.7 m.

The following list shows the kuppen (rounded hilltops) of the Langenberg and the Hoofer Pforte to the north along the main watershed, in order from north to south, with their heights in metres (m) above Normalhöhennull (NHN; according to) unless otherwise stated; branches to the east (E) and west (W) are indented; hills outside the Habichtswald Nature Park are asterisked (*):

- Hoofer Pforte
  - Lindenberg (485.9 m)
  - Großer Schönberg (482.8 m)
  - Kleiner Schönberg (ca. 442 m)
  - Burgberg (Schauenburg) (499.9 m), near Schauenburg-Hoof, county of Kassel, with remains of Schauenburg castle
- Langenberg/e
  - Saukopf (511.4 m), between Schauenburg-Breitenbach, -Elmshagen and -Hoof, Kassel
  - Essigberg (ca. 470 m), near Schauenburg-Elmshagen, Kassel
  - Schwengeberg (556.7 m), Schwalm-Eder-Kreis, near Niedenstein-Ermetheis
    - (O) Burgberg (Baunatal) (439.6 m), near Baunatal-Großenritte, Kassel; with ringwall
  - Laufskopf (534.8 m), Schwalm-Eder-Kreis, near Niedenstein-Ermetheis
  - Bensberg (464.8 m), bei Edermünde-Besse, Schwalm-Eder-Kreis
  - Bilstein (ca. 460 m), near Edermünde-Besse, Schwalm-Eder-Kreis, with Ringwall
  - Kammerberg (360.8 m), near Niedenstein-Metze, Schwalm-Eder-Kreis
    - (W) Junkerskopf * (284.2 m), bei Niedenstein-Metze, Schwalm-Eder-Kreis
  - Großer Wachenkopf * (333.1 m), near Niedenstein-Metze, Schwalm-Eder-Kreis
  - Kleiner Wachenkopf * (ca. 327 m), near Niedenstein-Metze, Schwalm-Eder-Kreis

=== Rivers and streams ===
Among the rivers and streams of the Langenberge are the:

- Bauna, tributary of the Fulda
- Ems (touches the Langenberge in the northwest), tributary of the Eder
- Goldbach, tributary of the Ems
- Leisel, tributary of the Bauna
- Lützel, tributary of the Bauna
- Matzoff, tributary of the Ems
- Pilgerbach, tributary of the Eder
- Wiehoff, tributary of the Ems

=== Settlements ===
Villages in the area of the Langenberge are:

- Schauenburg, Kassel
- Niedenstein, Schwalm-Eder-Kreis
- Baunatal, Kassel
- Edermünde, Schwalm-Eder-Kreis
- Gudensberg, Schwalm-Eder-Kreis
