= Niedenstein =

- Town
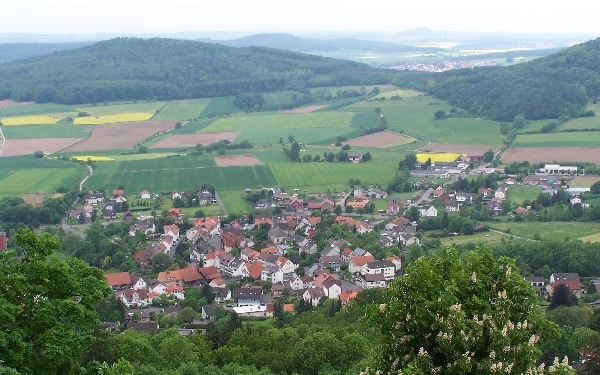

- Coat of arms

- Location of Niedenstein within Schwalm-Eder-Kreis district
- Interactive map of Niedenstein
- Location within Germany Location within Hesse
- Coordinates: 51°14′N 09°19′E
- Country: Germany
- State: Hesse
- Admin. region: Kassel
- District: Schwalm-Eder-Kreis
- Subdivisions: 5 Ortsteile

Government
  - Mayor (2021–27): Frank Grunewald

Area
  - Total: 30.61 km^{2} (11.82 sq mi)
- Elevation: 337 m (1,106 ft)

Population (2025-12-31)
  - Total: 5,587
  - Density: 182.5/km^{2} (472.7/sq mi)
- Time zone: UTC+01:00 (CET)
  - Summer (DST): UTC+02:00 (CEST)
- Postal codes: 34305
- Dialling codes: 05624 / 05603
- Vehicle registration: HR
- Website: www.niedenstein.de

Niedenstein (German: [ˈniːdnˌʃtaɪn]) is a small town and an officially recognized climatic spa in the Schwalm-Eder district in northern Hesse, Germany.

== Geography ==
=== Location ===
Niedenstein's main settlement lies to the southeast of the Habichtswald Nature Park, right on the western slope of the Langenberge, a low mountain range reaching 557 m. The nearest city is Kassel, about 15 km to the northeast. Niedenstein ist circled by several mountains. Schwengeberg (55m) and the Niedensteiner Kopf (475 m) with the Hessenturm, the Sengelsberg (448 m) and the Wartberg (306 m).

=== Neighbouring communities ===
In the north, Niedenstein abuts Schauenburg, in the east beyond the Langenberge it adjoins Baunatal and Edermünde, and in the southeast its constituent community of Metze on Gudensberg. In the south, the constituent community of Kirchberg, through which flows the river Ems, borders on Fritzlar, whose main town lies about 11 km away from Niedenstein. In the west, Niedenstein borders on Bad Emstal.

=== Constituent communities ===
The town has five centres. Besides the main town, also called Niedenstein, there are Ermetheis, Metze (about 1000 inhabitants), Kirchberg (about 900 inhabitants) and Wichdorf.

== History ==
The area around Niedenstein has been settled in early years. Therefore, archeological excavations have found relics from the Neolithic area. Niedenstein Castle had its first documentary mentioned in 1254 as Konrad II. von Elben held the castle for Duchess Sophie von Brabant against the troops of archbishop Gerhard von Dhaun from Mainz. The castle had been pillaged and destroyed in 1387 by the troops of archbishop Adolf I. from Mainz. The castle had been rebuilt only partially and been given up and destroyed completely in 1631. There are no remains of the original castle left to be seen.

It was Konrad von Elben, ordered by Duchess Sophie, who had built the new city in 1259 on his own land in the area of Wichdorf. This newly founded settlement was called Niedenstein ("Nydensteyne").

In 1584, the city counted 87 households with approx. 400 inhabitants. In 1578 Duke Wilhelm IV. gave the right to hold market twice a year to Niedenstein.

The thirty-year war nearly brought total destruction to Niedenstein. In 1631, Croatian riding troops under general Tilly conquered the city, pillaged it and burned it down. More than a third of all buildings burned down and the castle was completely destroyed. At the end of the war in 1648, only four people were left, living in Niedenstein. 14 of the buildings were still standing.

In the short living Napoleonic kingdom of Westphalen (1807 - 1813), Niedenstein was the smallest city. The city experienced a very late growth in population. Until 1939, there were only 630 people living there, by the end of 2020 there were 5392 people living in Niedenestein.

== Politics ==
=== Town council ===

Niedenstein's town council is made up of 23 members.

- SPD 6 seats
- Greens 4 seats
- CDU 4 seats
- FWG (citizens' coalition) 9 seats

(as of municipal elections held on 14 March 2021)

=== Town partnership ===
Niedenstein maintains a partnership with one place:

- Saint-Germer-de-Fly, France

It lies about 80 km northwest of Paris in Picardy.

== Culture and sightseeing ==
=== Museums ===
Niedenstein is home to the Heimatmuseum Kirchberg ("Kirchberg Homeland Museum")

=== Buildings ===
- Evangelical Village Church
- Altenburg; a settlement built up on a basalt crag, once a pre-Germanic castle village that was forsaken even before the Christian Era, making its earlier identification with the Chatti's capital Mattium unfounded. There are many archaeological finds on show from the Altenburg at the Hessian State Museum in Kassel.

=== Natural monuments ===
- Niedensteiner Kopf (475 m above sea level)
- Tanz- und Gerichtslinde ("Dance and Court Linden", on the way out of town to the west)

== Personalities ==
- Jürgen Schweinebraden, Freiherr von Wichmann-Eichhorn, gallery owner and publisher
