= Goldbach (Ems) =

River of Hesse, Germany

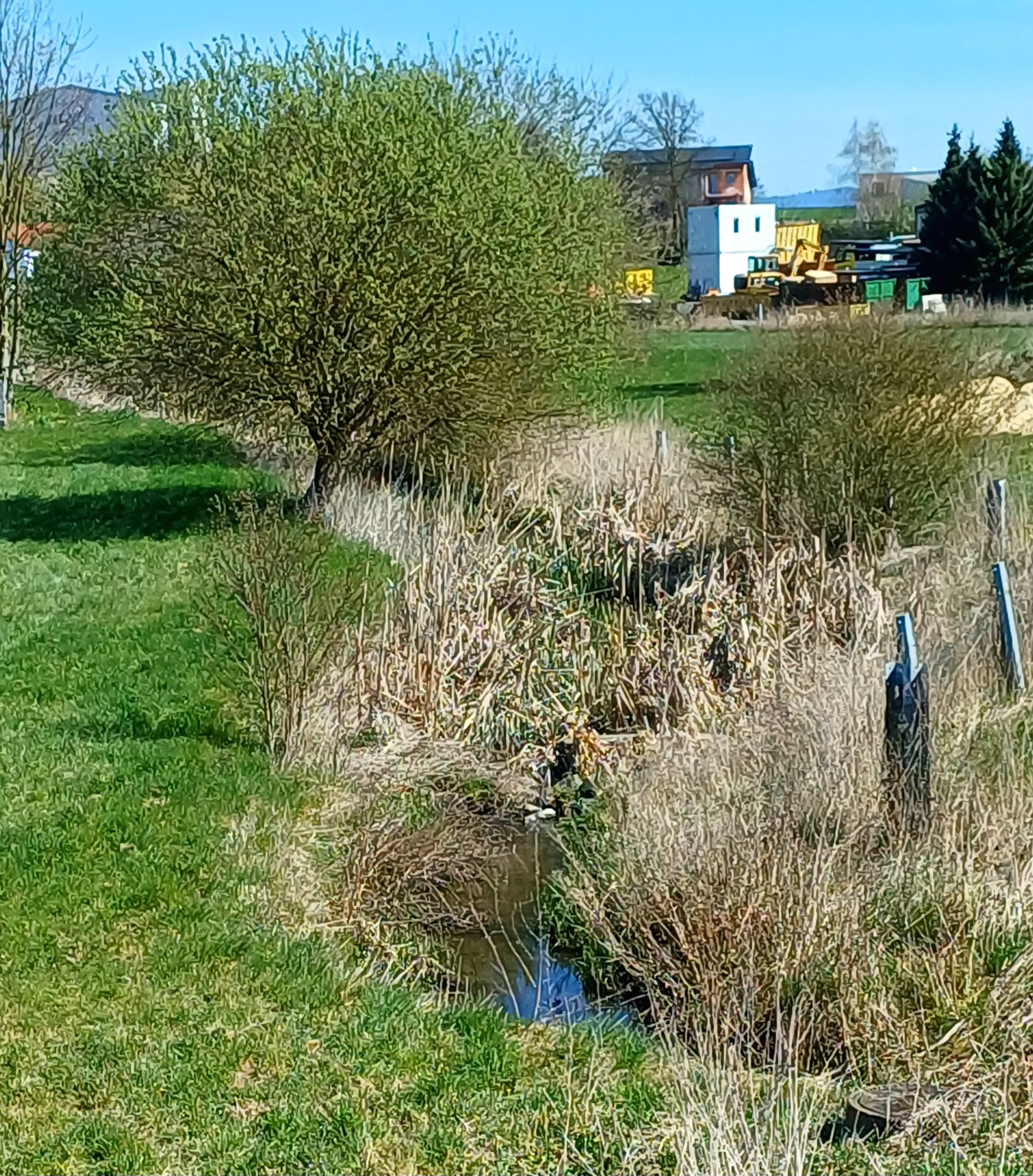

Location
- Country: Germany
- States: Hesse

Physical characteristics
- Mouth
  - location: Ems
  - coordinates: 51.1530°N 9.3859°E

Basin features
- Progression: Ems→ Eder→ Fulda→ Weser→ North Sea

The Goldbach (German pronunciation: [ˈɡɔltbax]) is a river of Hesse, Germany. It is a tributary of the Ems near Gudensberg.

The Goldbach rises in the extreme southeast of the Habichtswald Nature Park, south of the Langenberge.

== See also ==
- List of rivers of Hesse
