= Matzoff =

River in Germany

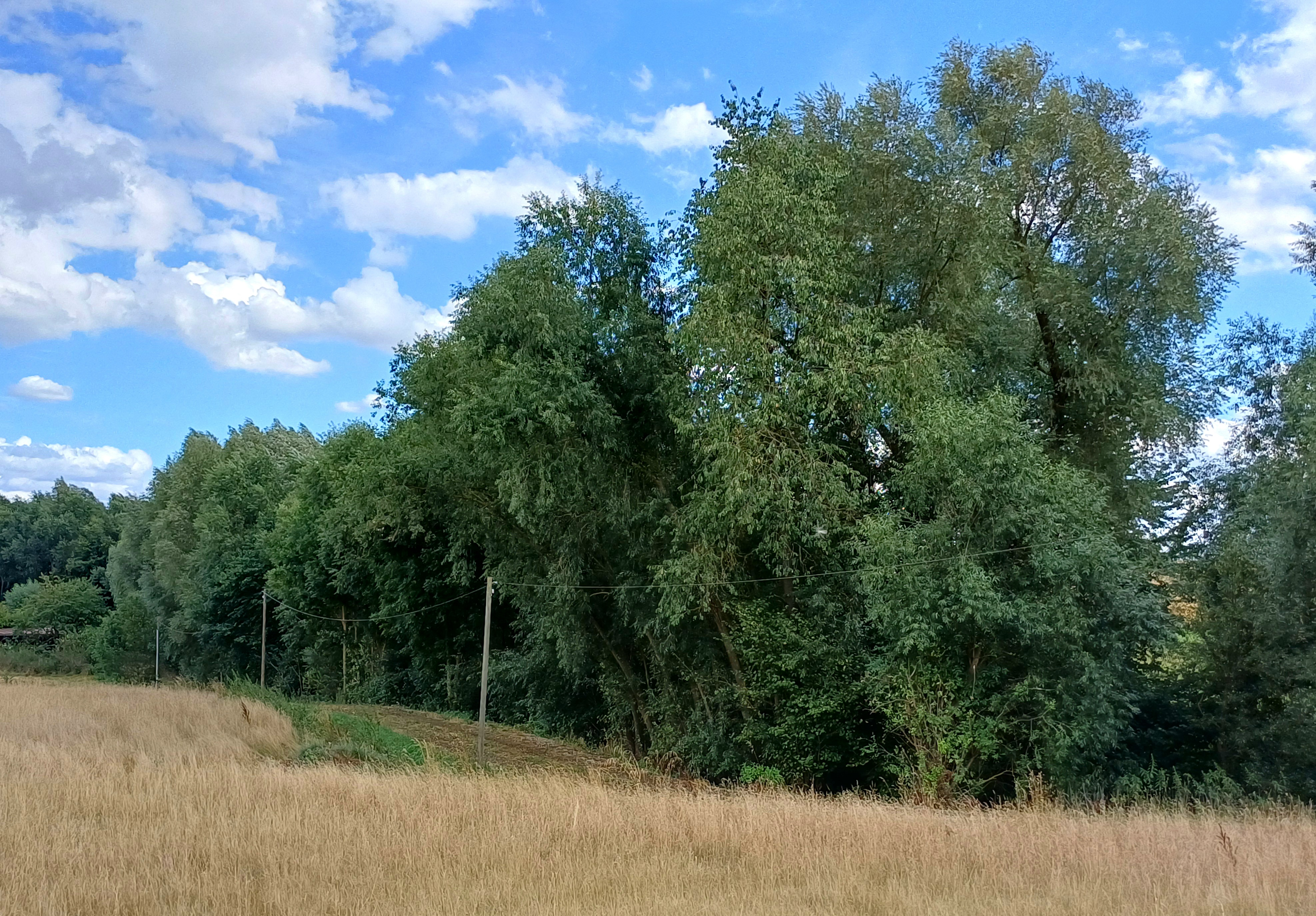

Location
- Country: Germany
- States: Hesse

Physical characteristics
- Mouth
  - location: Ems
  - coordinates: 51.1964°N 9.2959°E

Basin features
- Progression: Ems→ Eder→ Fulda→ Weser→ North Sea

Matzoff is a river of Hesse, Germany. It flows into the Ems in Niedenstein-Kirchberg.

== See also ==
- List of rivers of Hesse
