= River Ems =

River Ems may refer to:

- Ems (river), a river in northwestern Germany and northeastern Netherlands, discharges in the Dollart Bay
- Ems (Eder), a river of Hesse, Germany, tributary of the Eder
- River Ems (Chichester Harbour), a river in the English counties of West Sussex and Hampshire
