= Bilstein (Langenberge) =

Coordinates: 51°13′37″N 9°21′16″E

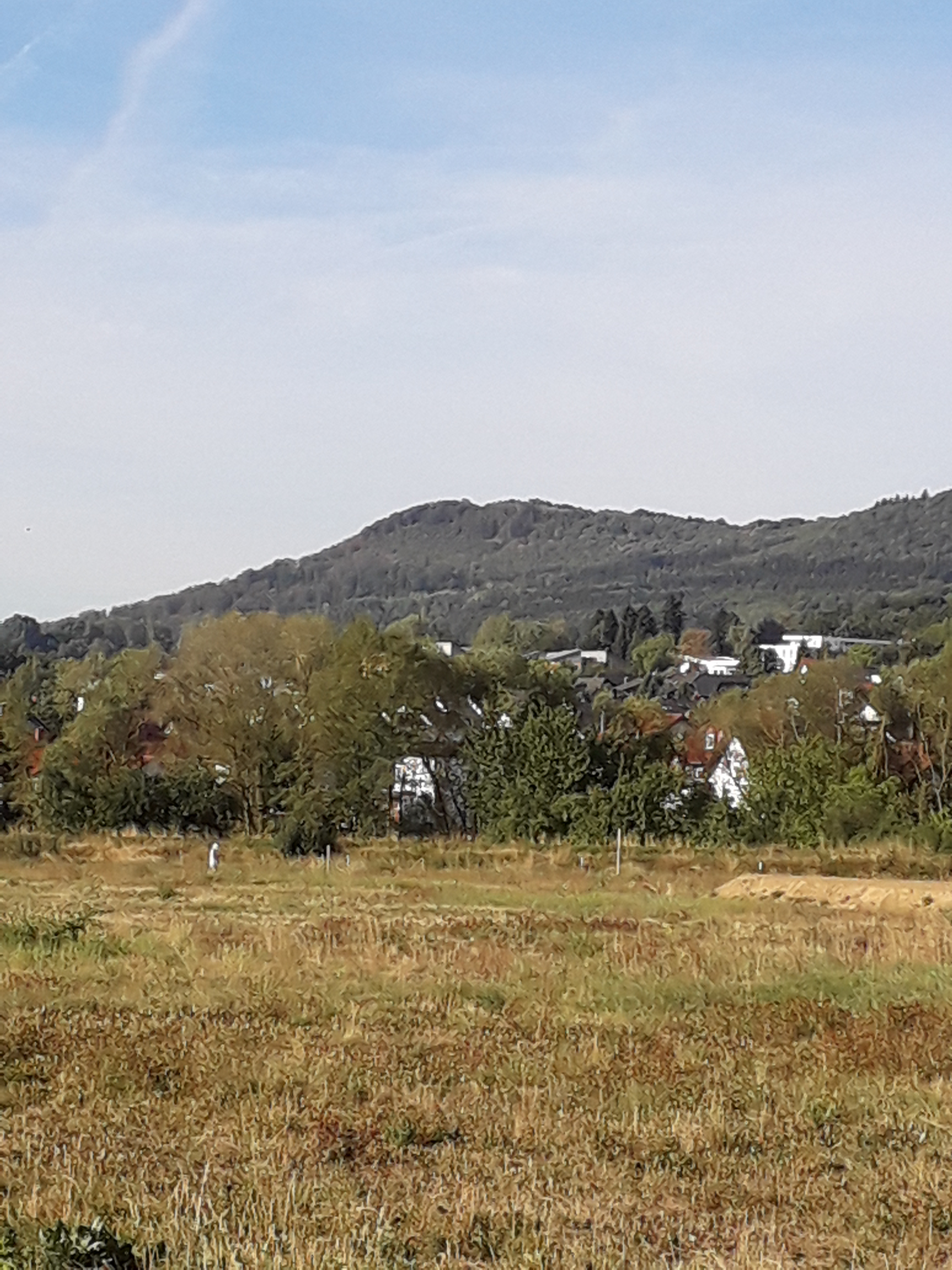

Highest point
- Elevation: 460 m (1,510 ft)

Geography
- Location: Schwalm-Eder-Kreis, Hesse, Germany

The Bilstein is a hill in the county of Schwalm-Eder-Kreis, Hesse, Germany. It lies within the Langenberge range.

In 1882, Dr Brunner found a previously unknown ring wall on the hill.
