= Baunatal =

- Town
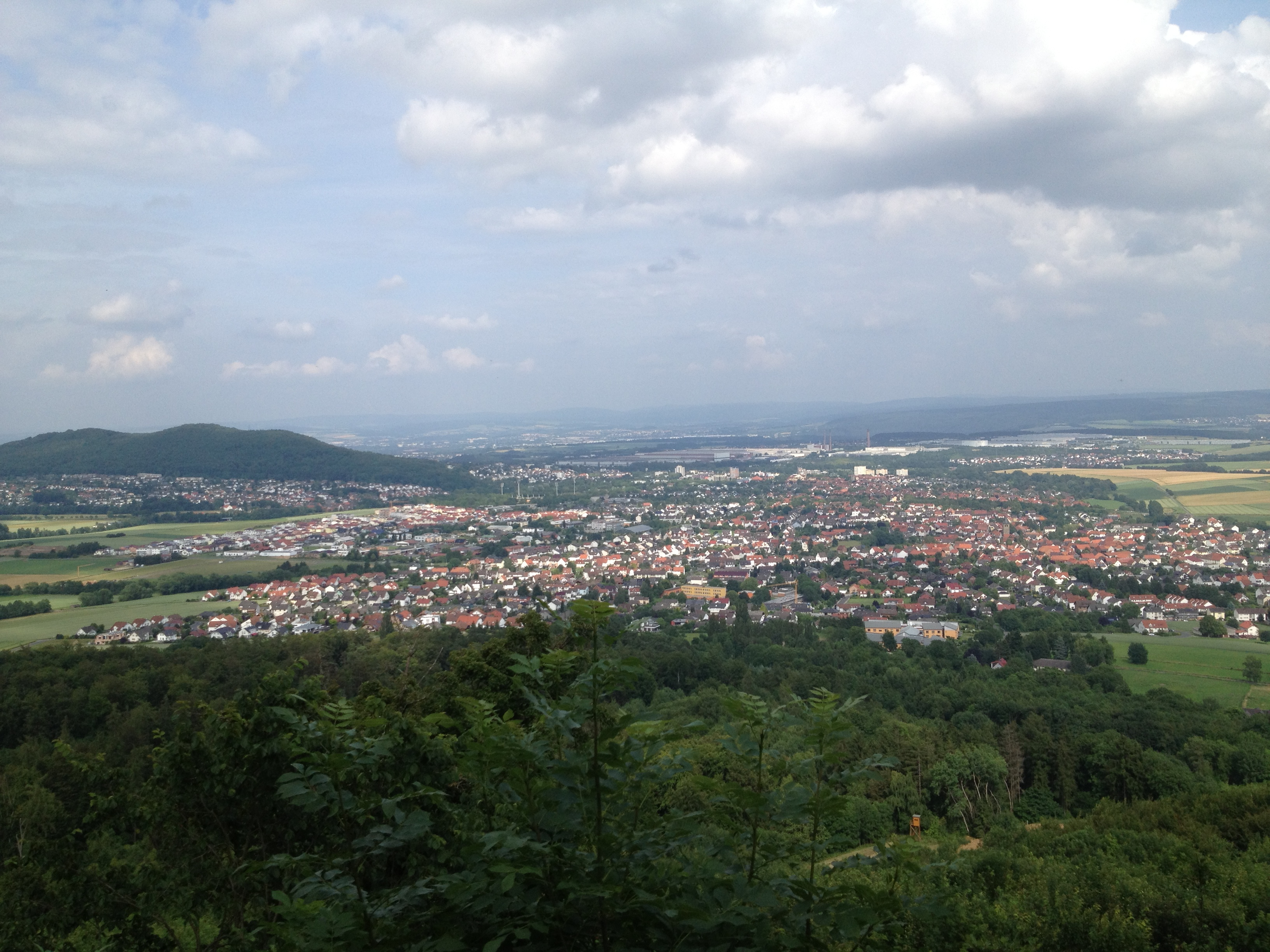
- Baunatal seen from Burgberg

- Coat of arms

- Location of Baunatal within Kassel district
- Interactive map of Baunatal
- Location within Germany Location within Hesse
- Coordinates: 51°15′32″N 09°25′06″E
- Country: Germany
- State: Hesse
- Admin. region: Kassel
- District: Kassel

Government
  - Mayor: Henry Richter (Ind.)

Area
  - Total: 38.27 km^{2} (14.78 sq mi)
- Elevation: 210 m (690 ft)

Population (2025-12-31)
  - Total: 27,768
  - Density: 725.6/km^{2} (1,879/sq mi)
- Time zone: UTC+01:00 (CET)
  - Summer (DST): UTC+02:00 (CEST)
- Postal codes: 34225
- Dialling codes: 0561, 05601, 05665
- Vehicle registration: KS
- Website: www.baunatal.de

Baunatal (German pronunciation: [ˈbaʊnataːl], lit. 'Bauna Valley') is a town in the district of Kassel, in Hesse, Germany. It is a comparatively young town which arose from fusion of the formerly independent municipalities Altenbauna, Altenritte, Großenritte, Guntershausen, Hertingshausen, Kirchbauna and Rengershausen in 1966.

In 1999, the town hosted the 39th Hessentag state festival.

== Geography ==
Boroughs of Baunatal

=== Geographic location ===
Baunatal directly borders on the south of Kassel and is located to the west of the valley of the Fulda river. West and northwest the town borders on the Habichtswald with the Baunsberg (413,4 m above sea level) in the north. Baunatal got its name from the Bauna river, which traverses the town from the northwest to the southeast until it flows into the Fulda near Guntershausen.

=== Neighbouring communities ===
Baunatal borders in the north on the municipality of Schauenburg and the urban district of Kassel, in the east on the municipality of Fuldabrück, in the southeast on the municipality of Guxhagen, in the south on the municipality of Edermünde and in the west on the town of Niedenstein.

== History ==
The Volkswagenwerk Kassel was built in 1957 on the former premises of the Henschel & Son company in Altenbauna. In 1960, just one year after start of production, the number of employees exceeded 6,000. Due to this rapid development the residential area and housing demands were rising. As a consequence of this the three municipalities Altenbauna, Altenritte and Kirchbauna fused into Baunatal on 1 January 1964.

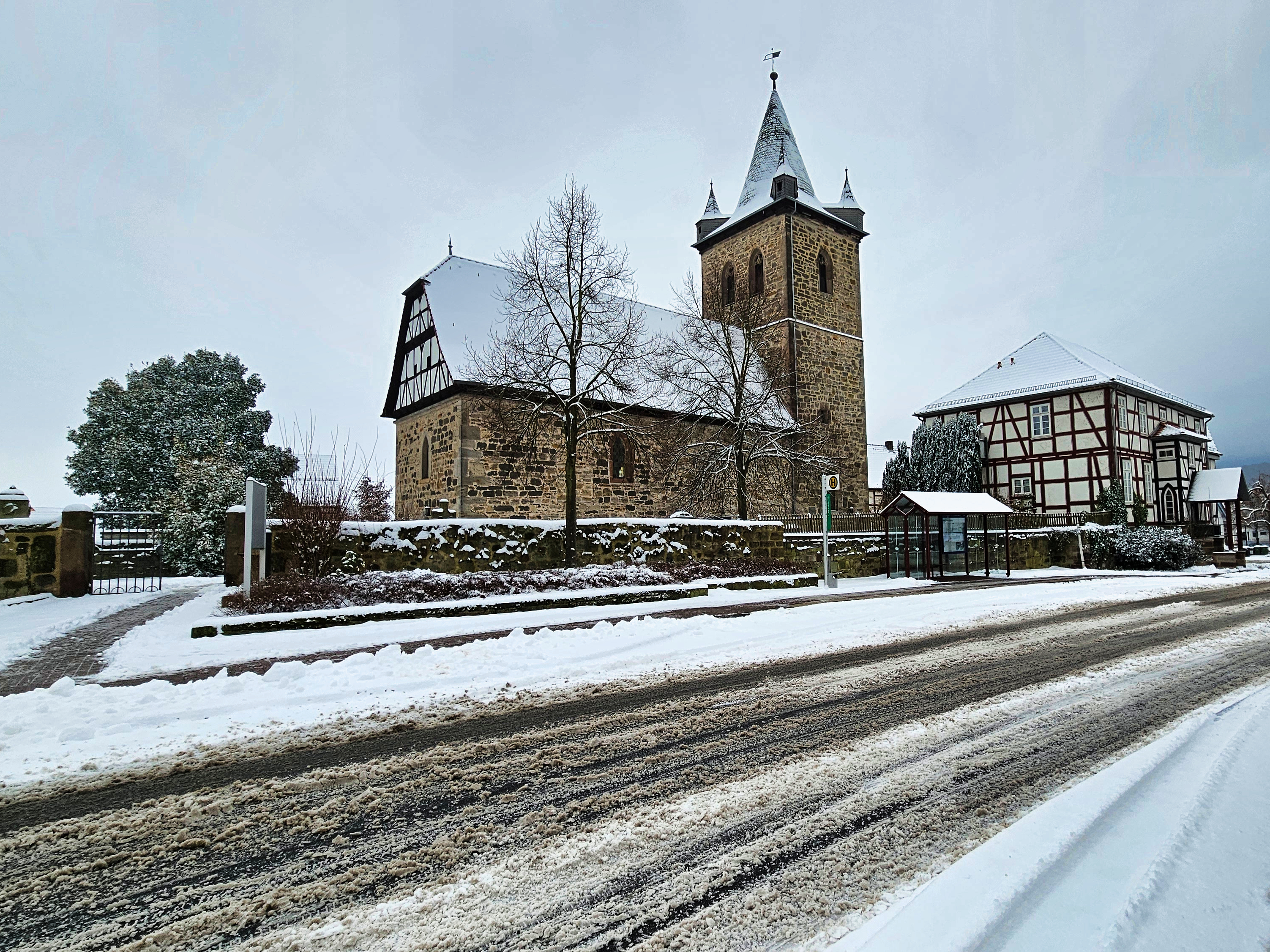
Half-timber buildings are typical for the region.

On 1 July 1966 with incorporation of Großenritte, Baunatal received town privileges by the Government of Hesse. First mayor of the new founded town was Horst Werner. At this time the number of inhabitants was 11,705 and the number of employees of the Volkswagen factory was about 13,400.

On 1 October 1971 the municipality of Hertingshausen joined Baunatal. On 1 August 1972 finally the municipality of Buchenhagen, which was a fusion of Guntershausen and Rengershausen, joined Baunatal. The population of Baunatal was about 19,300 in 1972. Currently (31 December 2025) the number of inhabitants is 27,768.

== Transport ==
Baunatal is connected to the city of Kassel by trams and buses. The town also has its own bus network called StadtBus Baunatal which is operated by the Regionalverkehr Kurhessen GmbH (RKH). In addition the quarters Rengershausen and Gunterhausen are connected to the national rail network and provide connection to the Main–Weser Railway and the Frederick William Northern Railway by means of the RegioTram Kassel.

Baunatal is connected to the motorways A 7, A 44 and A 49.

== Politics ==
=== Town council ===
The local election held on 14 March 2021 yielded the following results:

| Parties and voter communities | | % 2021 | Seats; 2021 | % 2016 | Seats; 2016 |
| SPD | Social Democratic Party of Germany | 50.9 | 23 | 61.4 | 27 |
| CDU | Christian Democratic Union of Germany | 21.7 | 10 | 19.6 | 9 |
| GREENS | Alliance '90/The Greens | 19.5 | 9 | 10.5 | 5 |
| FDP | Free Democratic Party | 8.0 | 3 | 8.5 | 4 |
| Total | | 100 | 45 | 100 | 45 |
| Voter turnout in % | | 42.8 | | 46.2 | |

=== Mayors ===
Mayors of Baunatal since 1 July 1966:

- Horst Werner
- Martin Hesse
- Hans Joachim Pioch
- Heinz Grenacher
- Manfred Schaub
- Silke Engler
- Manuela Strube
- Henry Richter

== Culture ==
=== Stadtmuseum ===
The Stadtmuseum is a museum of local history located in Baunatal-Altenritte. The main focus of the museum is the history of the 20th century particularly with regard to the following topics: first railway construction, history of the Henschel & Son arms factory, everyday life during nazism, history of the Volkswagen factory since 1957, urban development of Baunatal since 1966.

=== Heimatmuseum Hessenstube ===
The Heimatmusesum is a museum of local history located in Baunatal-Altenritte. The museum delivers insight into living and working environment of people in the ancient villages of Baunatal from the late 19th century to the early 20th century. The museum presents rural housing conditions, a historical smithy and historical workshops of joiners, shoemakers and woodturners.

=== Dorothea Viehmann ===
Baunatal is the birthplace of the famous storyteller Dorothea Viehmann. She was one of the most important sources of the fairy tale collection of the Brothers Grimm. Dorothea Viehmann was born as Katharina Dorothea Pierson on 8 November 1755 in Rengershausen.

=== Hünstein ===
The Hünstein is a cultural monument located in Baunatal-Großenritte. The menhir consisting of quartzite was a site of ritual meetings during the 4th and 3rd century BC. A legend says that a giant threw the menhir from the nearby Hirzstein with intent to destroy the steeple of Kirchbauna.

== Industry ==
Baunatal is known for the Volkswagen factory, which is the second largest of the brand with 13,500 employees. The factory does not construct vehicles but rather delivers components and assemblies to other plants of the company. The sphere of business is mainly divided into the following parts: gear manufacturing, foundry, exhaust systems, car body pressing, Original Teile Center (original parts center), Volkswagen coaching. The premises have a total area of 2,404,737 m^{2} (25,884,374 sq ft) and are directly connected to the rail network and the motorway A 49. In June 2015, a robot killed a man at the Volkswagen facility, in what is believed to be a case of human error.

== Sport ==
Baunatal hosts the following sports clubs and teams:

- KSV Baunatal (e.g. football, handball)
- GSV Eintracht Baunatal (e.g. football, handball)
- Pinguine Baunatal (Inline hockey)

== Twin towns – sister cities ==
Baunatal is twinned with:

- Vire-Normandie, France (1983)
- Sangerhausen, Germany (1990)
- San Sebastián de los Reyes, Spain (1990)
- Vrchlabí, Czech Republic (1991)
- Caterham, United Kingdom (2016)

In honour of the twinning to Baunatal there is an Avenida de Baunatal (English: Baunatal Avenue) in San Sebastián de los Reyes. Additionally, one station of Line 10 of the Madrid Metro is named after this Avenida. As the addition "Avenida" is typically omitted, the station is simply called Baunatal.
