= Bergpark Wilhelmshöhe =

UNESCO World Heritage Site
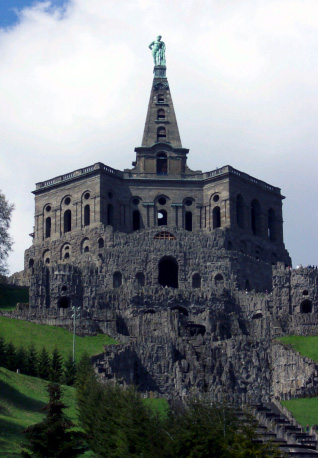
- Hercules monument at the Bergpark, landmark of Kassel

- Location within Hesse Location within Germany
- Location: Kassel, Hesse, Germany
- Criteria: Cultural: (iii), (iv)
- Reference: 1413
- Inscription: 2013 (37th Session)
- Area: 558.7 ha (1,381 acres)
- Buffer zone: 2,665.7 ha (6,587 acres)
- Coordinates: 51°18′57″N 09°23′35″E

Bergpark Wilhelmshöhe is a landscape park in Kassel, Germany. The area of the park is 2.4 square kilometres (590 acres), making it the largest European hillside park, and second largest park on a hill slope in the world. Construction of the Bergpark, or "mountain park", began in 1689 at the behest of the Landgraves of Hesse-Kassel and took about 150 years. The park is open to the public today. Since 2013, it has been a UNESCO World Heritage Site because of its monumental Baroque architecture and its unique fountains and water features.

== Geography ==
=== Location ===
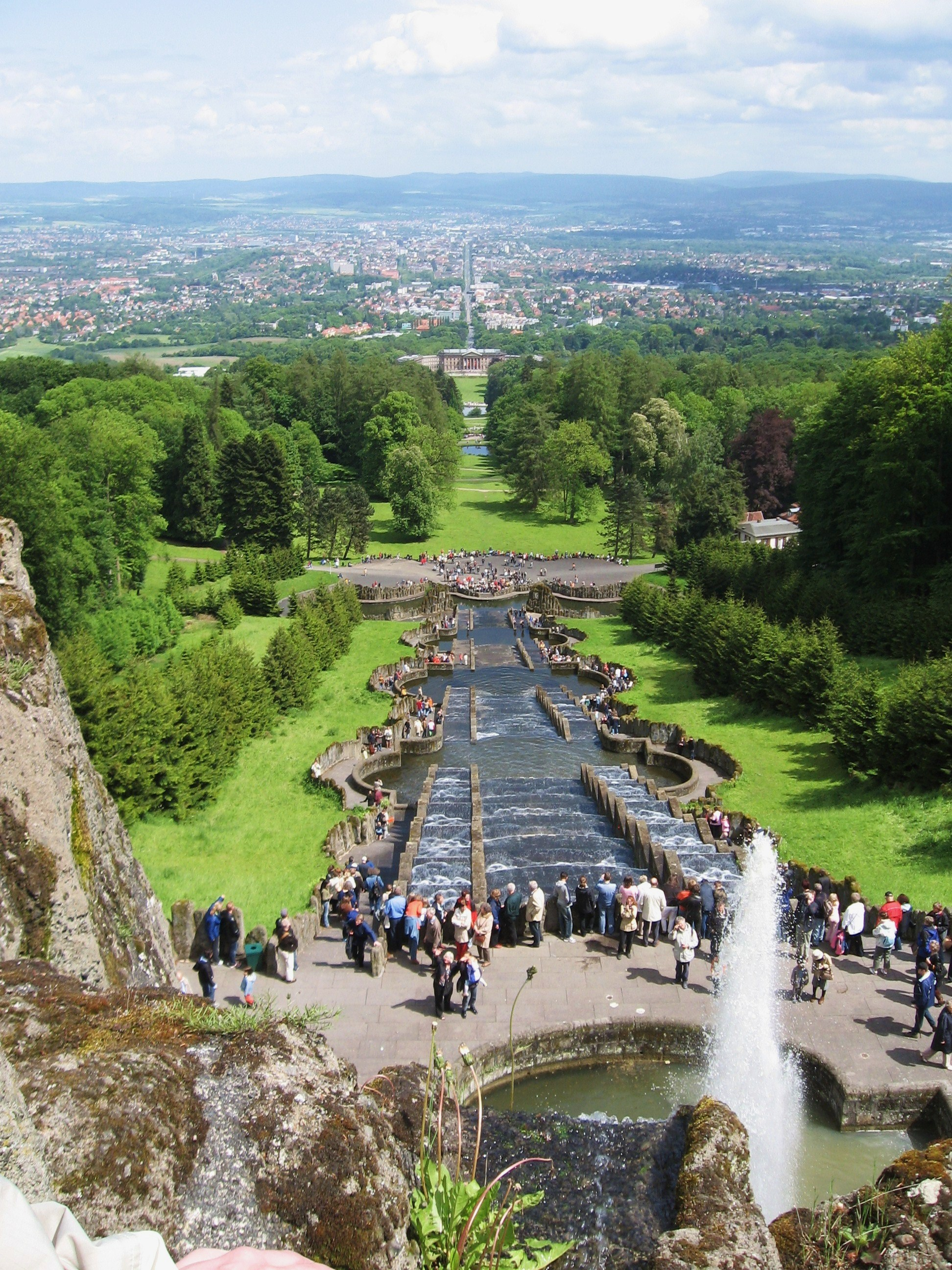
View towards Kassel

Bad Wilhelmshöhe, a Stadtteil of Kassel in northern Hesse, is situated west of the city centre at the foot of the Habichtswald hill range. It is also known for Kassel-Wilhelmshöhe station on the Hanover–Würzburg high-speed railway line.

== Description ==
The park comprises an area of about 2.4 square kilometres (0.93 mi^{2}), stretching from Kassel up to the Karlsberg mountain at 526.2 metres (1,726 ft). At the summit of the park stands the Hercules monument, a 40-meter high pyramid with a 8.5-meter bronze statue of Hercules. Behind the monument, a series of reservoirs gather water, which passes through a complex series of channels, valves, aqueducts, and water-wheels as it flows from the monument down through the park. The water tumbles through a Baroque water theatre, grotto, fountains, two hydraulic organs, and several waterfalls (including a Great Cascade that is 350 meters long) before arriving at the pond, with the Great Fountain. At about 50 meters (160 ft) high, the Great Fountain was the largest fountain in Europe at the time of its creation in 1767. Below the pond and Great Fountain, the water runs in to ponds and pools at the Wilhelmshöhe Palace, built for the Elector of Hesse William I in the late 18th century.

=== Hercules ===
The Kassel Hercules is a copper statue depicting the ancient Greek demigod Heracles (Gr. Ηρακλής, German Herkules). It is a copy of the third century Farnese Hercules statue, created by Johann Jacob Anthoni, a goldsmith from Augsburg. Beneath the stature of Hercules are basins and figures such as centaurs and fauns who hold horns. When this water display is turned on, the pressure change produces a sound through the horns.

== History ==
Originally laid out in the Baroque style of the giardino all'italiana and the French formal garden, with water features running downhill in cascades to Schloss Wilhelmshöhe, it was later re-arranged into an English landscape garden.

In 1143, Canons Regular from Mainz established the Weißenstein monastery at the site of present-day Schloss Wilhelmshöhe, which was dissolved in the course of the Protestant Reformation. Landgrave Philip I of Hesse used the remaining buildings as a hunting lodge, largely rebuilt by his descendant Maurice of Hesse-Kassel from 1606 to 1610.

=== 1696–1806 ===
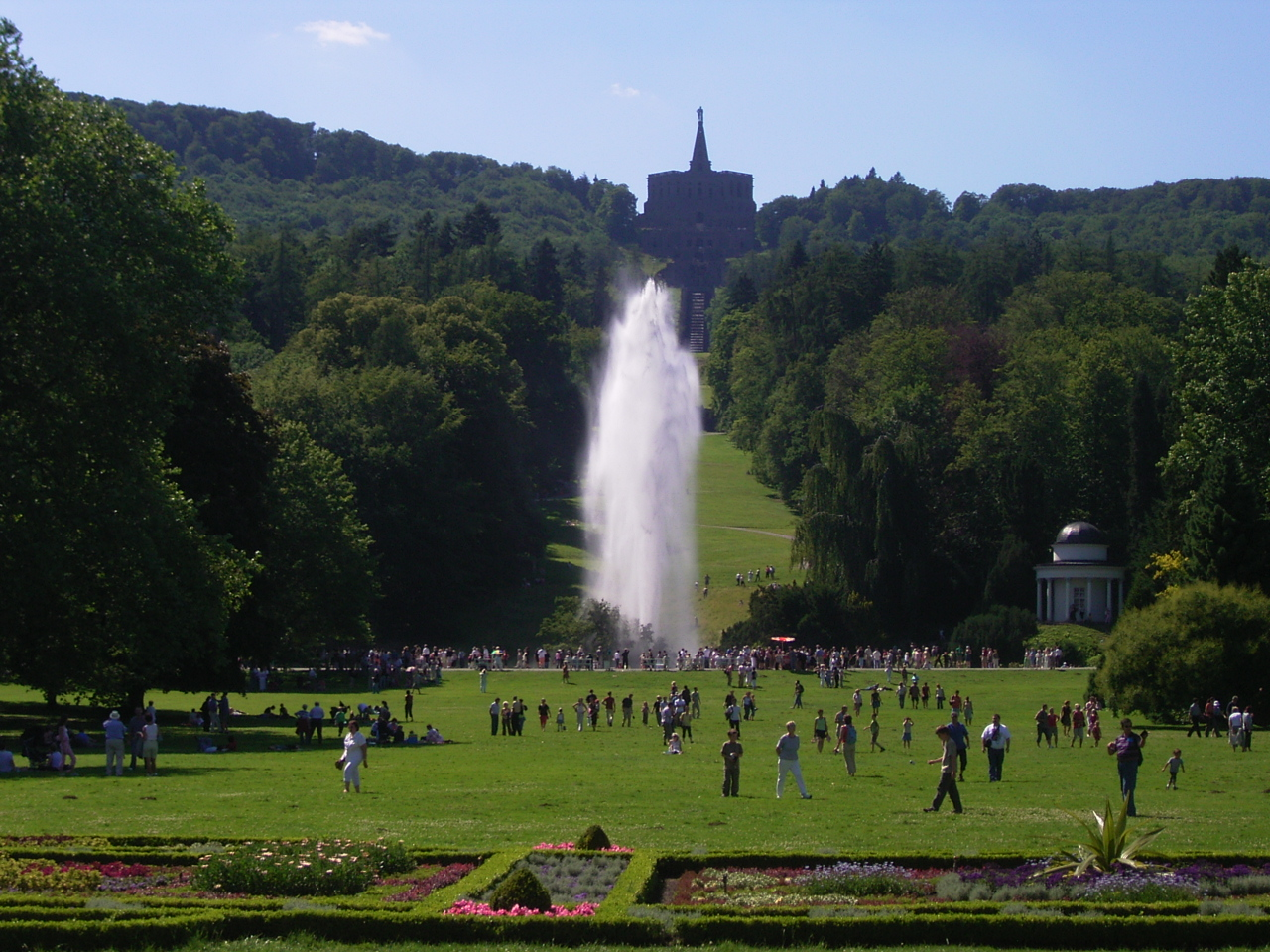
The large fountain

The Bergpark came into being as a Baroque park under Landgrave Charles I of Hesse-Kassel. In 1701, the Italian architect Giovanni Francesco Guerniero started the construction of the Hercules monument and the giant cascades. In 1785, Wilhelm (William) IX, Landgrave of Hesse started a large extension of the park, and the following year his architect, Simon Louis du Ry, designed the Neoclassical palace Schloss Wilhelmshöhe.

Meanwhile, the ideals of the landscaping changed from the French Baroque to the English garden. In the course of the extension and modifications, Heinrich Christoph Jussow, apart from contributing to the design of the palace, created constructions still characterizing the park today: artificial ruins like the Löwenburg (Lion's Castle) and the Roman aqueduct, as well as extensions of the water garden like the Lac, the fountain pond, and the Teufelsbrücke (Devil's Bridge) with the Höllenteich (Hell's Pond). In 1793, Karl Steinhöfer added the Steinhöfer Waterfall to the water garden.

=== 1806–1866 ===
Kassel became the capital of the newly created Kingdom of Westphalia, a vassal state of France, ruled by Napoleon's brother Jérôme Bonaparte. He kept court at the palace of Wilhelmshöhe (which was renamed Napoleonshöhe) until 1813, after Napoleon's defeat and the restoration of the electorate. The king's Head Chamberlain and governor of Napoleonshöhe was Count Heinrich von Blumenthal. In 1826, William II, Elector of Hesse ordered the last large construction of the Bergpark Wilhelmshöhe, the grosser Wasserfall (Great Waterfall).

=== 1866–1918 ===
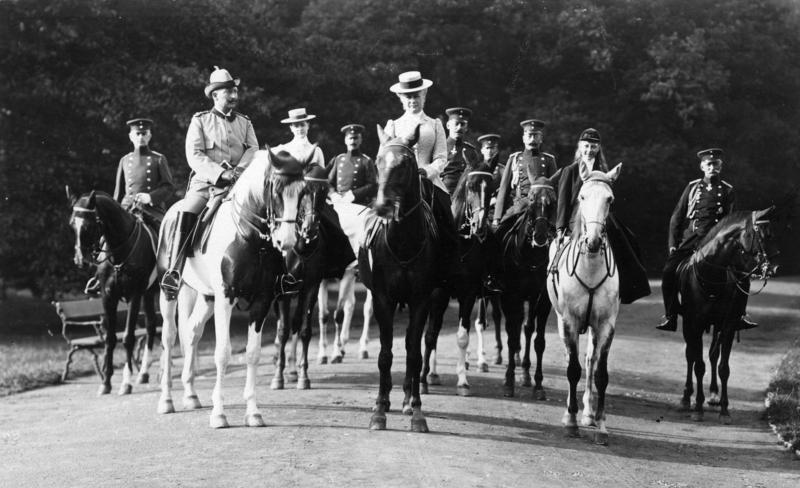
Emperor Wilhelm II in the Bergpark in 1906

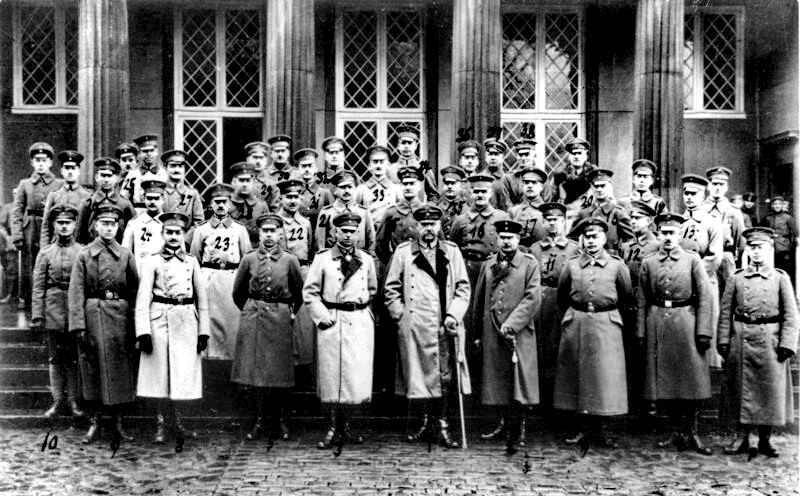
Members of the Oberste Heeresleitung, High Command of the German Army, November 1918

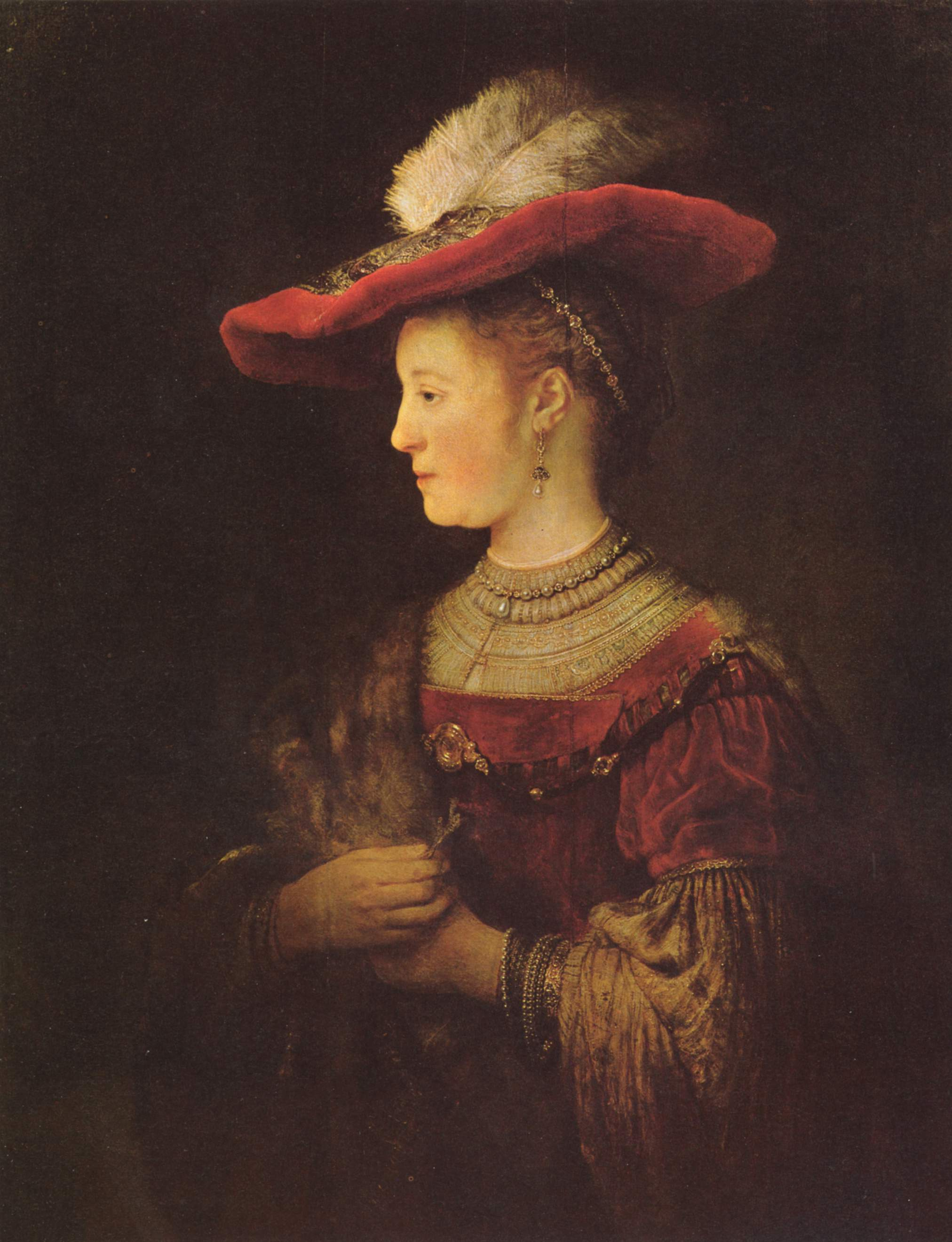
Rembrandt's "Saskia"

Having sided with Austria in the Austro-Prussian War for supremacy in Germany, the principality was annexed by the Kingdom of Prussia in 1866. The Prussian administration united Nassau, Frankfurt, and Hesse-Kassel into the new Prussian province of Hesse-Nassau. Kassel ceased to be a princely residence, the dynasty of the creators of the park ended.

In 1870, after the Battle of Sedan, French Emperor Napoleon III was sent as a prisoner to Schloss Wilhelmshöhe before going into exile in Britain. From 1899, German Emperor Wilhelm II, who went to school in Kassel, chose Wilhelmshöhe as his summer residence, which turned the castle and the park into a centre of European politics for the next two decades. After the armistice which ended World War I, the Oberste Heeresleitung led by Paul von Hindenburg organized and led the withdrawal and demobilization of the German troops from here from November 1918 to February 1919.

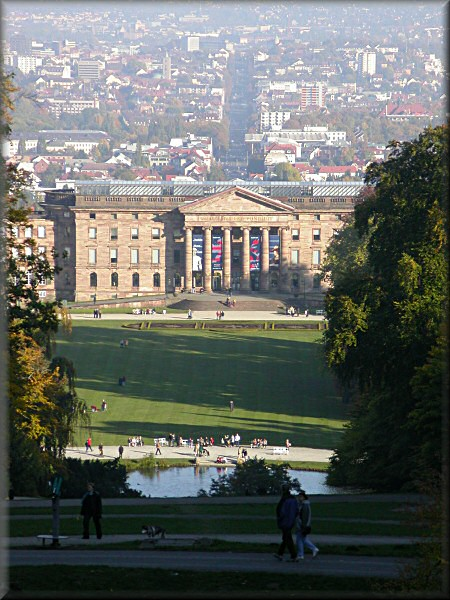
Schloss Wilhelmshöhe

=== 20th and 21st century ===
Schloss Wilhelmshöhe was damaged by Allied bombs in World War II. From 1968 to 1974, it was rebuilt as an art museum. It houses a wallpaper collection, a collection of Graeco-Roman antiques, and a gallery of Old Masters paintings. The collection focuses on the 16th and 17th century, containing masterpieces by German, Italian, French and Spanish painters. It comprises the second-largest collection of Rembrandts in Germany. Rembrandt's famous "Saskia" and "The Man with the Slouch Hat" by Frans Hals are among them.

In 1972, the Chancellor of West Germany Willy Brandt and the Prime Minister of the German Democratic Republic Willi Stoph met in Schloss Wilhelmshöhe for negotiations between the two German states.

No extensions were made to the Park in the 20th century. Extensive renovations to the Hercules monument and cascades have been ongoing in the 21st century, and are still in progress; much of the monument continues to be shrouded in scaffolding.

== Today ==
Bergpark Wilhelmshöhe is administered by the State of Hesse and affiliated with the European Garden Heritage Network since 2009. On 23 June 2013 it was proclaimed as a World Heritage Site during the UNESCO meeting in Phnom Penh. It is part of the Museumslandschaft Hessen Kassel.

== Evaluation ==
Art historian Georg Dehio (1850–1932), inspirator of the modern discipline of historic preservation, described the park as "possibly the most grandiose combination of landscape and architecture that the Baroque dared anywhere" ("vielleicht das Grandioseste, was irgendwo der Barock in Verbindung von Architektur und Landschaft gewagt hat.").

== Literature ==
- Giovanni Francesco Guerniero, Delineatio Montis, Cassel 1706
- Paul Heidelbach, Die Geschichte der Wilhelmshöhe. Klinkhardt & Biermann, Leipzig, 1909
- Horst Becker und Michael Karkosch, Park Wilhelmshöhe, Parkpflegewerk, Bad Homburg und Regensburg 2007, ISBN 978-3-7954-1901-1.
- Verwaltung der Staatlichen Schlösser und Gärten Hessen, ComputerWorks AG und Michael Karkosch, Kassel-Wilhelmshöhe, Gartendenkmalpflegerische Zielplanung mit VectorWorks Landschaft, Lörrach 2007.
- Bernd Modrow und Claudia Gröschel, Fürstliches Vergnügen, 400 Jahre Gartenkultur in Hessen, Verlag Schnell und Steiner, Bad Homburg und Regensburg 2002, ISBN 3-7954-1487-3.
- Michael Karkosch, Zeitreise in die Jahrhundertwende, Der Kaiserpark Wilhelmshöhe in Kassel, in: SehensWerte, Heft 4, Besuchermagazin der Verwaltung der Staatlichen Schlösser und Gärten Hessen, Bad Homburg 2008, S. 28f.
- Dunja Richter, Der Duft der großen weiten Welt, Wilhelminische Pflanzenhausarchitektur in Kassel, in: SehensWerte, Heft 4, Besuchermagazin der Verwaltung der Staatlichen Schlösser und Gärten Hessen, Bad Homburg 2008, S. 30.
- Michael Karkosch, Zurückgelassen in der Heimat, Erdmann – Lieblingsteckel Seiner Majestät, in: SehensWerte, Heft 4, Besuchermagazin der Verwaltung der Staatlichen Schlösser und Gärten Hessen, Bad Homburg 2008, S. 35.
- Siegfried Hoß, Kaiserliche Farbenpracht – neu entfacht!, in: SehensWerte, Heft 4, Besuchermagazin der Verwaltung der Staatlichen Schlösser und Gärten Hessen, Bad Homburg 2008, S. 42.
- Marianne Bolbach, Geschichte und soziale Bedeutung des Bergparks Wilhelmshöhe, Kassel 1988.
- Paul Heidelbach, Die Geschichte der Wilhelmshöhe, Leipzig 1909, Nachdruck, hrsg. v. Dieter Carl, Vellmar 2005.
- Alfred Hoffmann und Herrmann Mielke. Kassel – Schlosspark Wilhelmshöhe – Bäume und Sträucher, hrsg. v. d. Verwaltung der Staatlichen Schlösser und Gärten Hessen, Bad Homburg 1994 (3. überarbeitete Aufl.).
- Jutta Korsmeier, Wasserkünste im Schlosspark Wilhelmshöhe, hrsg. v. d. Verwaltung der Staatlichen Schlösser und Gärten Hessen, Bad Homburg und Regensburg 2000, ISBN 3-7954-1287-0.
- Helmut Sander, Das Herkules-Bauwerk in Kassel-Wilhelmshöhe, Kassel 1981.

== Gallery ==
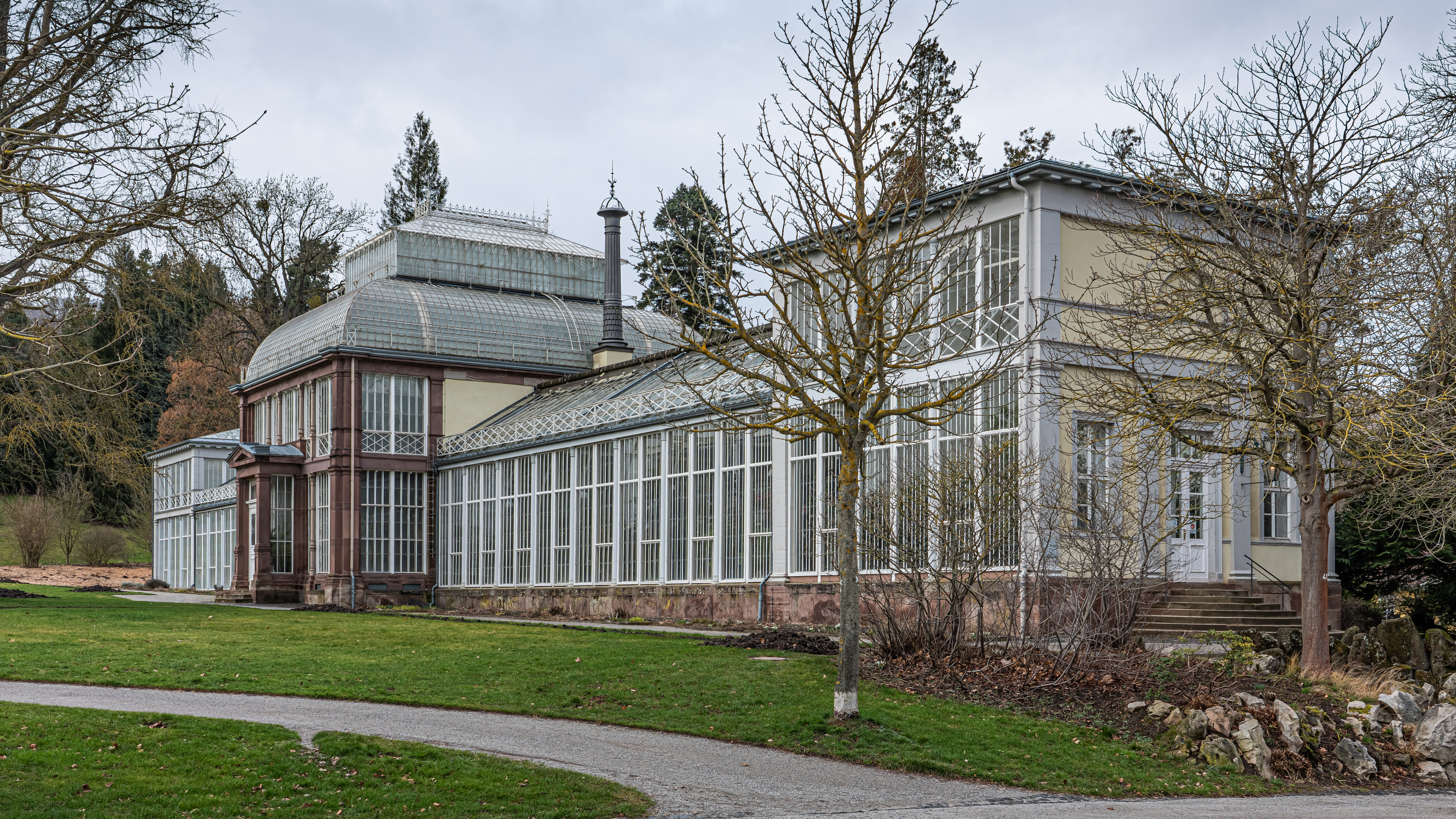
The orangery

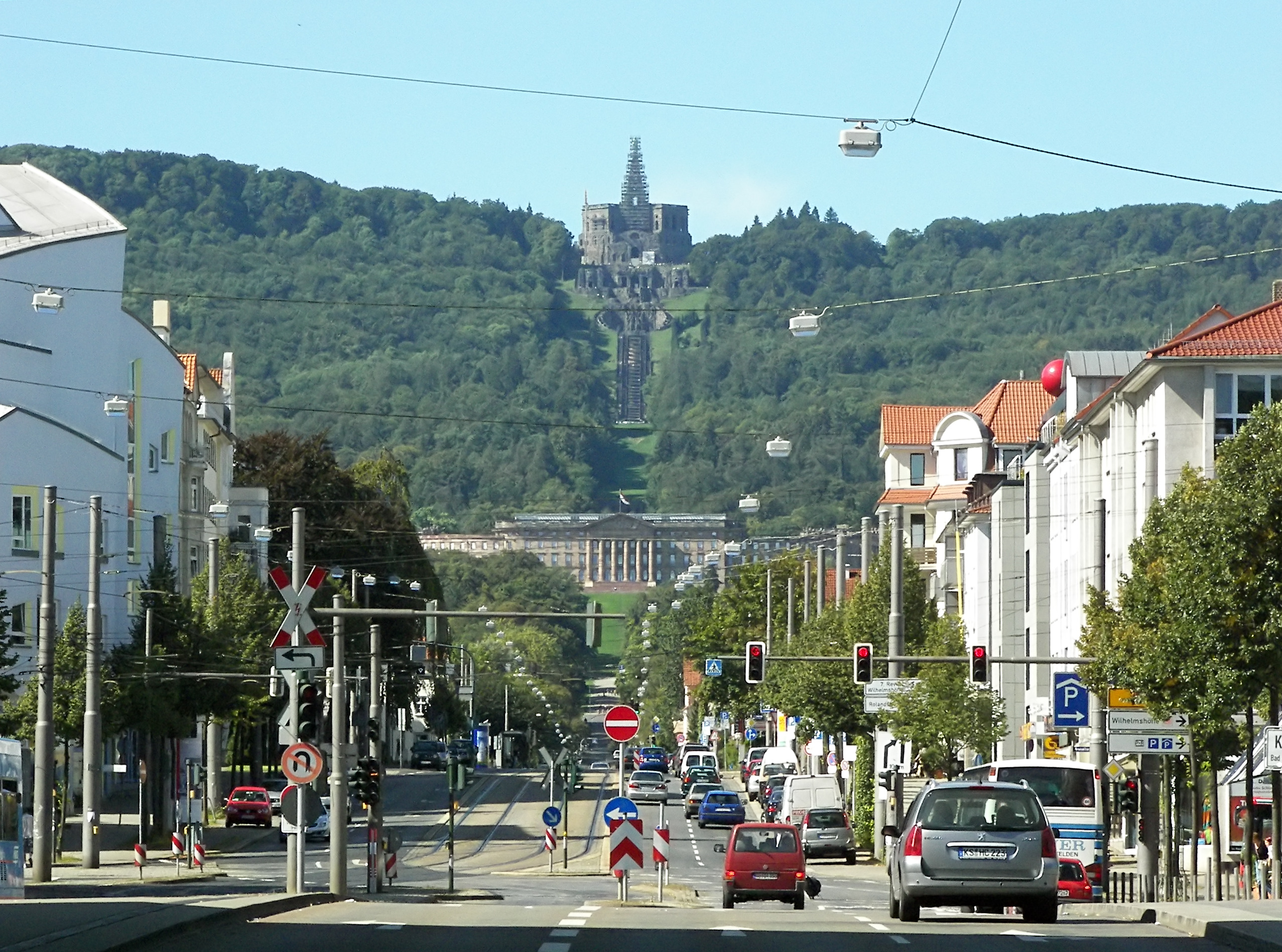
Bergpark Wilhelmshöhe, as seen from downtown Kassel

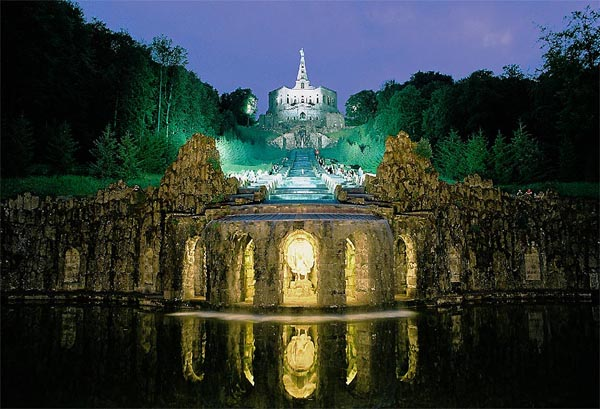
Water arts, lit at nighttime

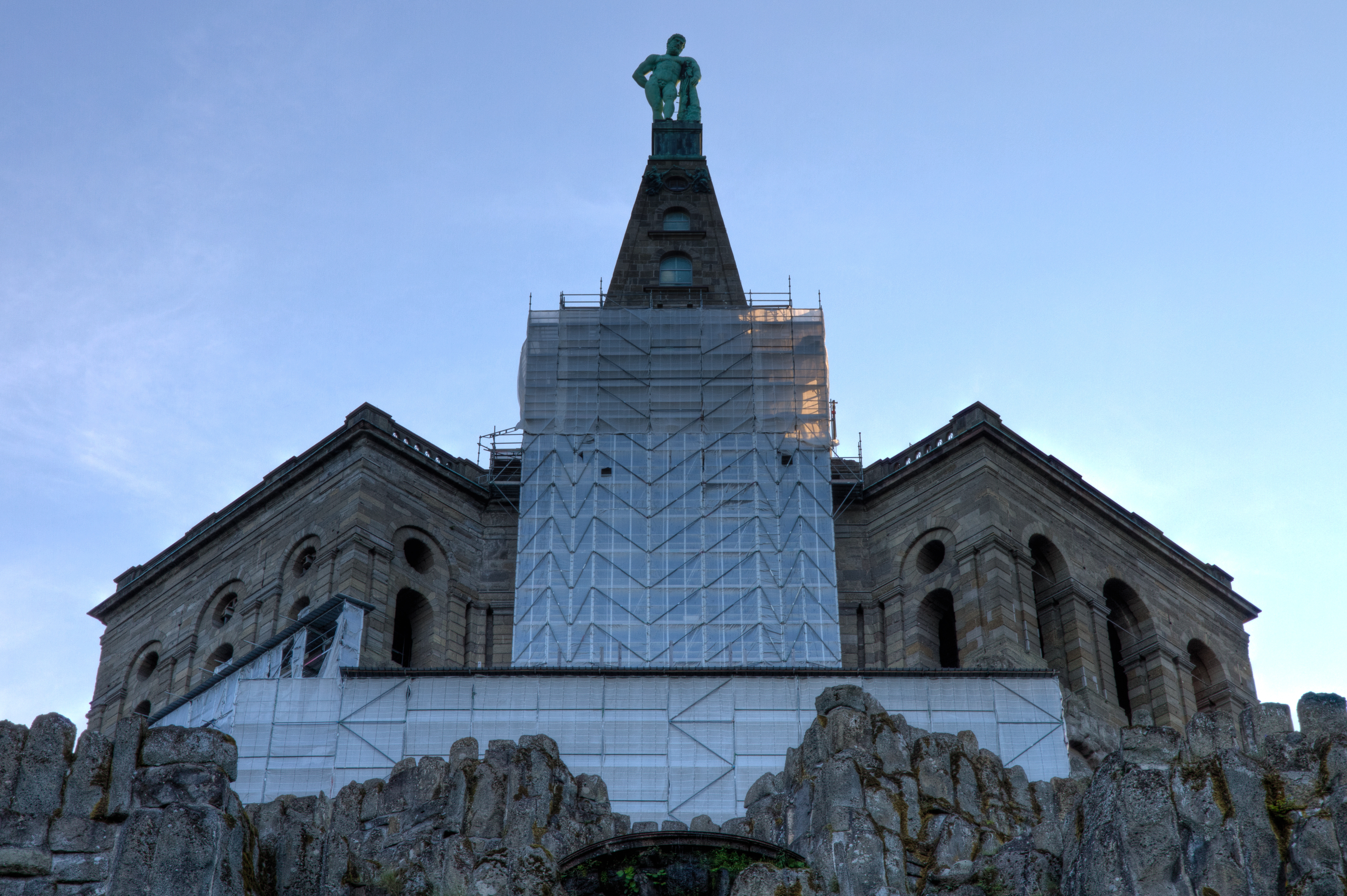
Hercules statue atop the octagon, as seen during renovation in 2011

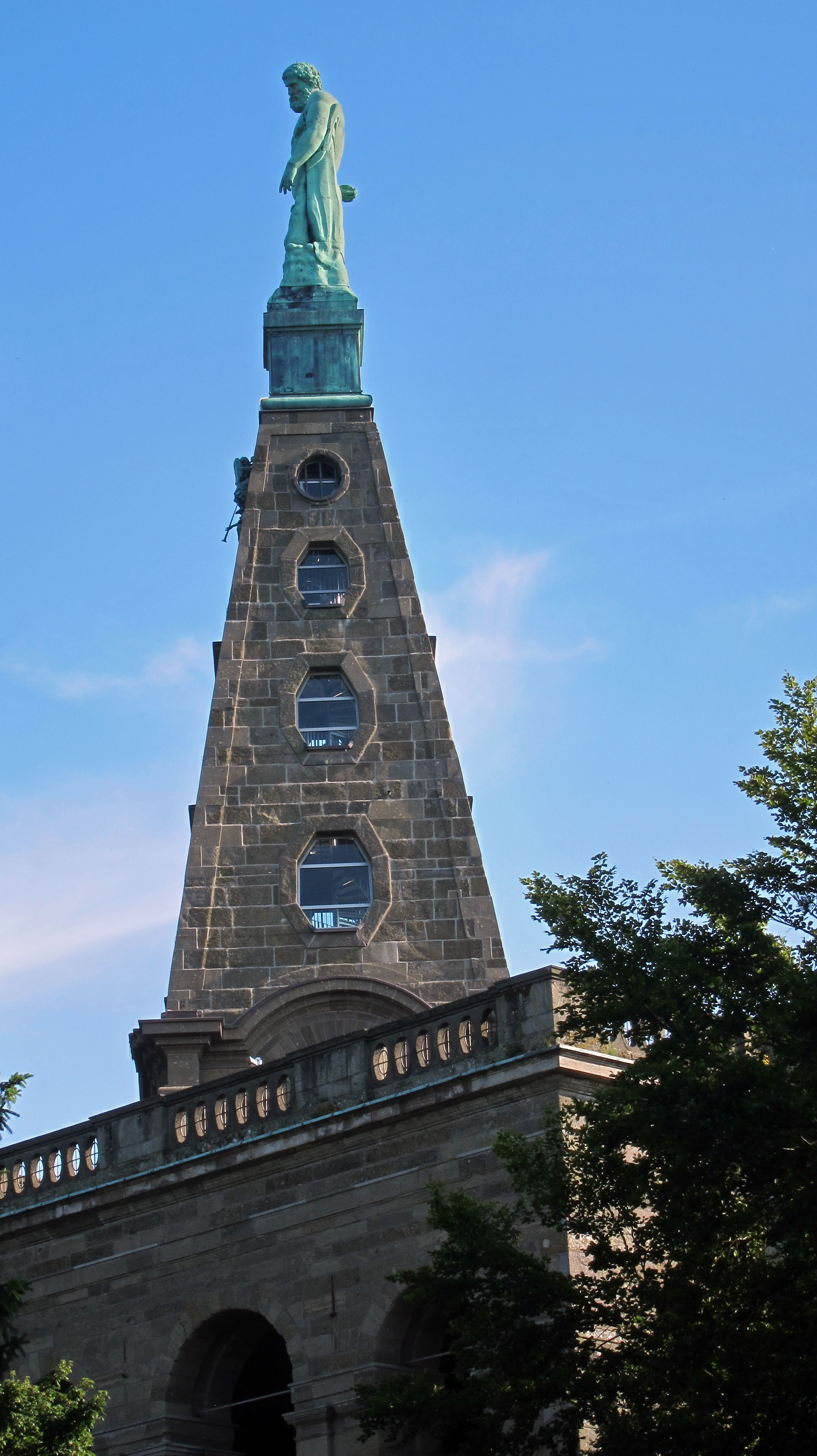
Bergpark Wilhelmshöhe, side view of the Hercules statue

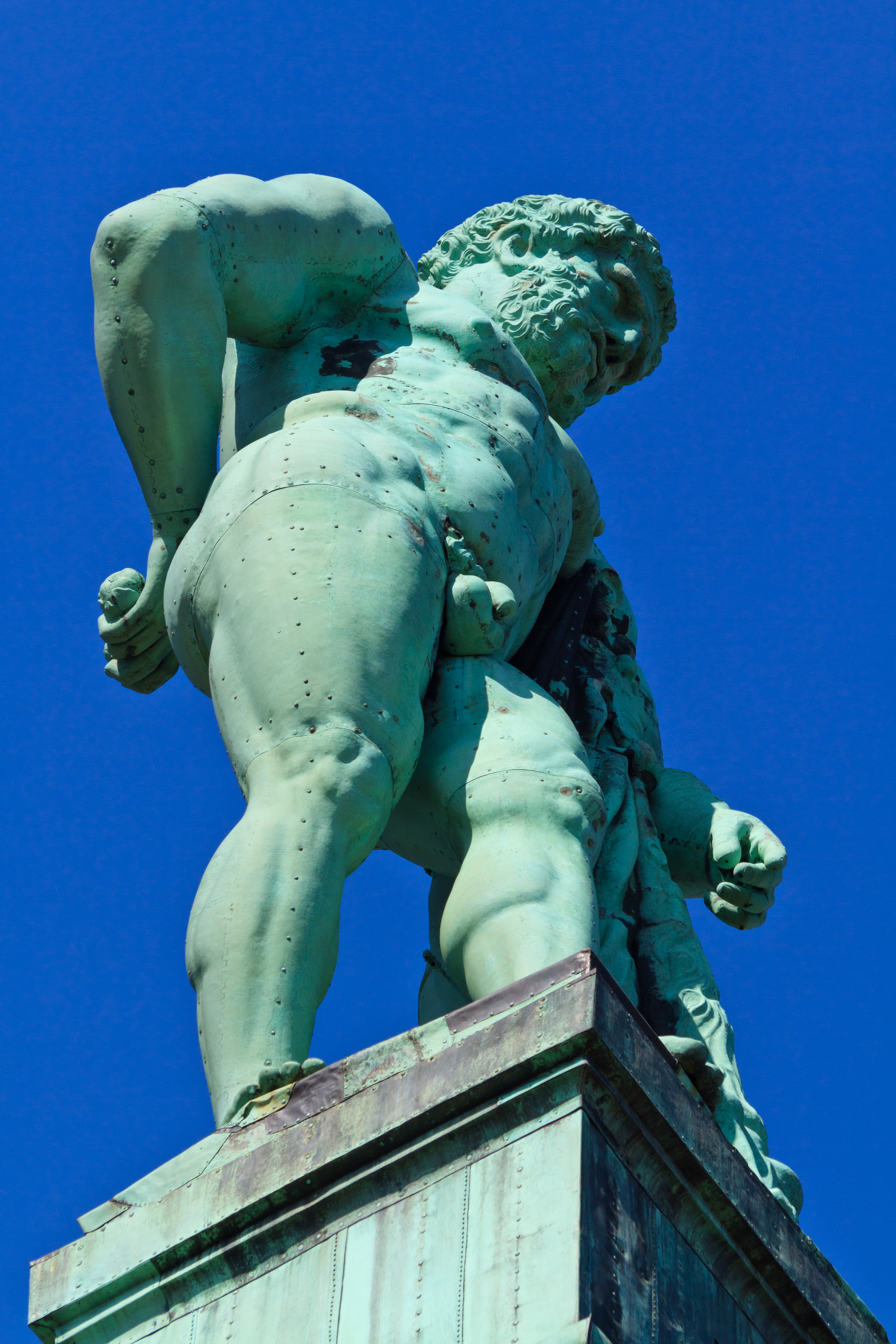
Closeup of Hercules statue

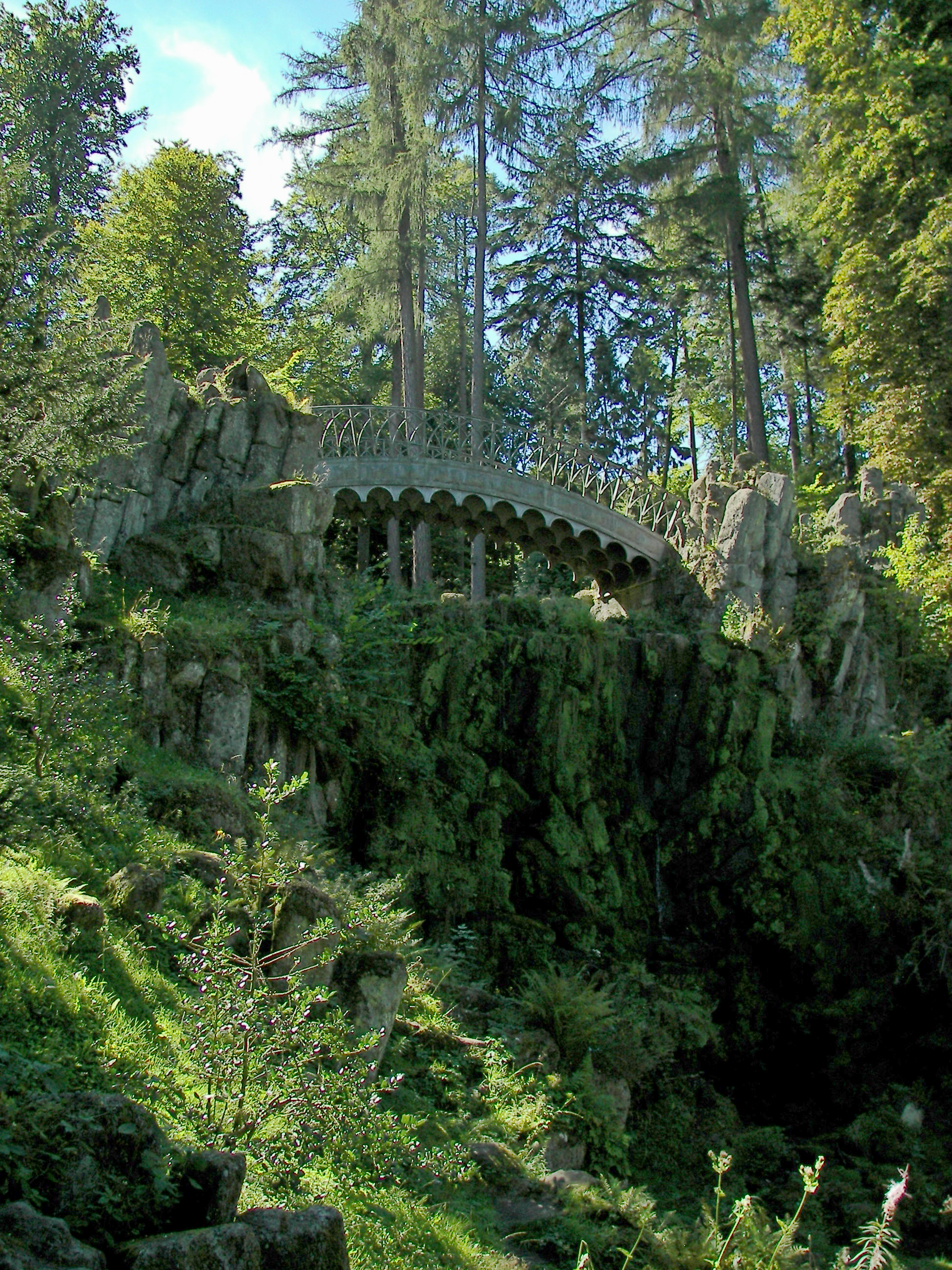
The Teufelsbrücke (Devil's Bridge)

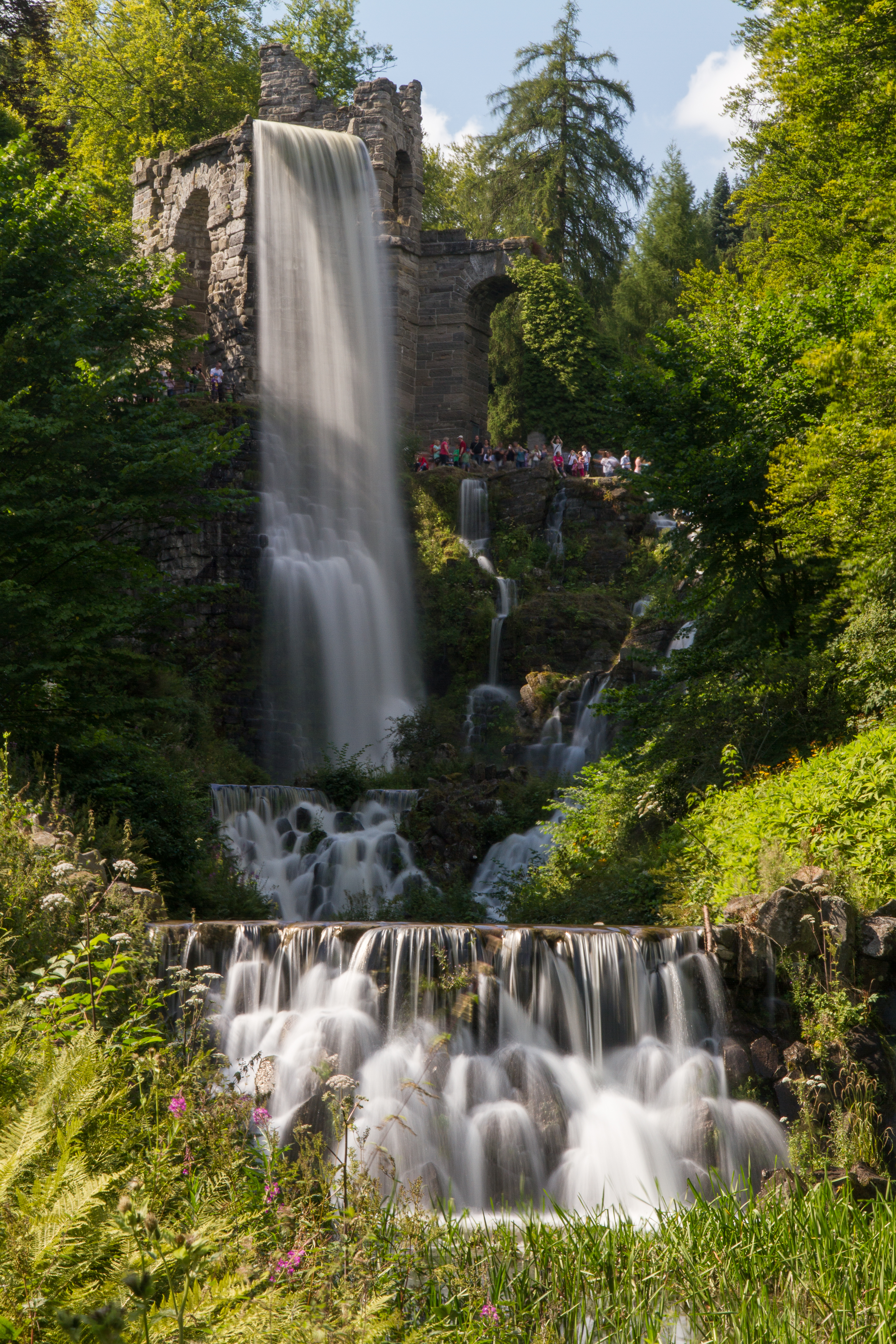
Artificial waterfall

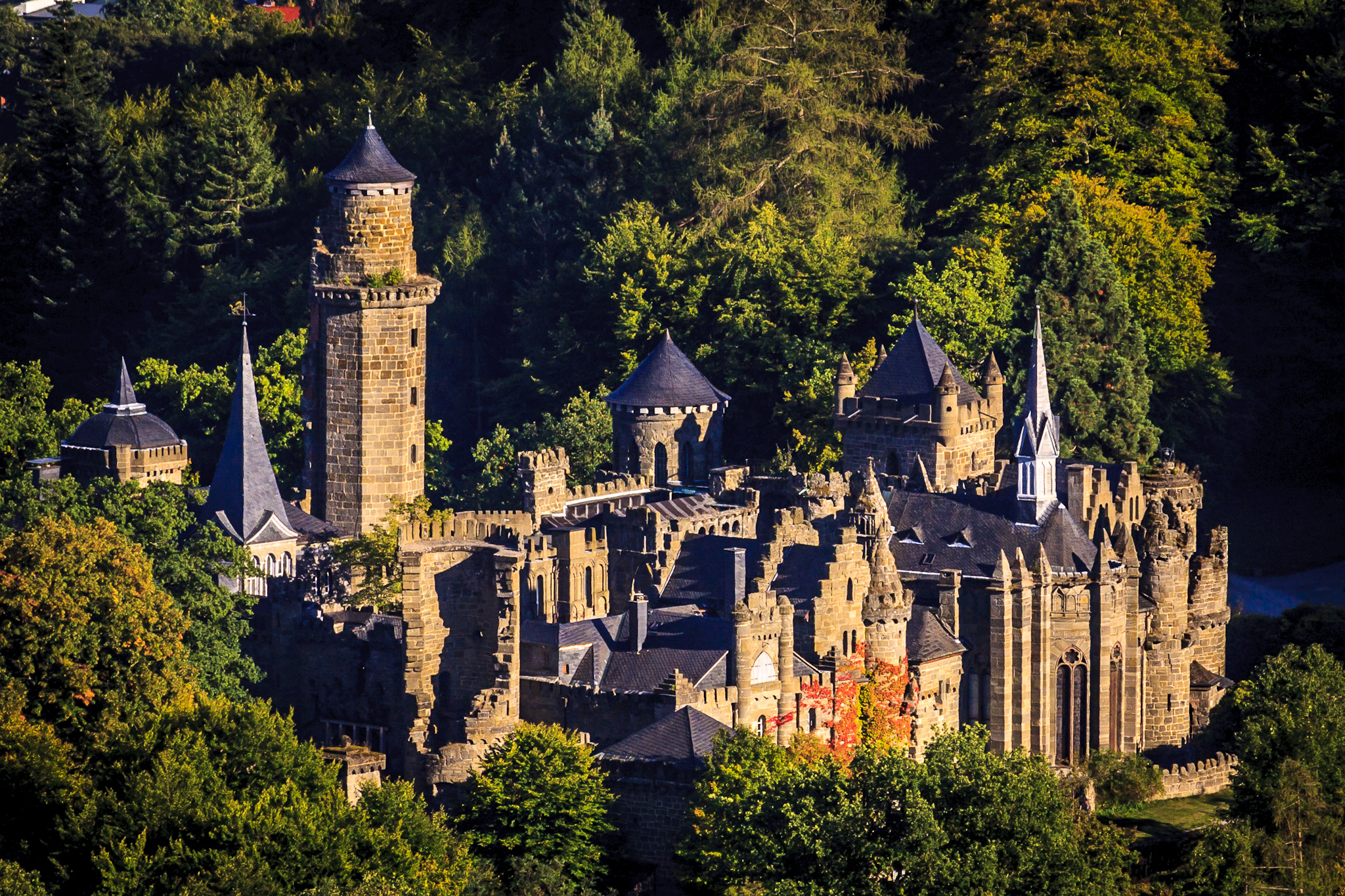
The Löwenburg (Lion's Castle)

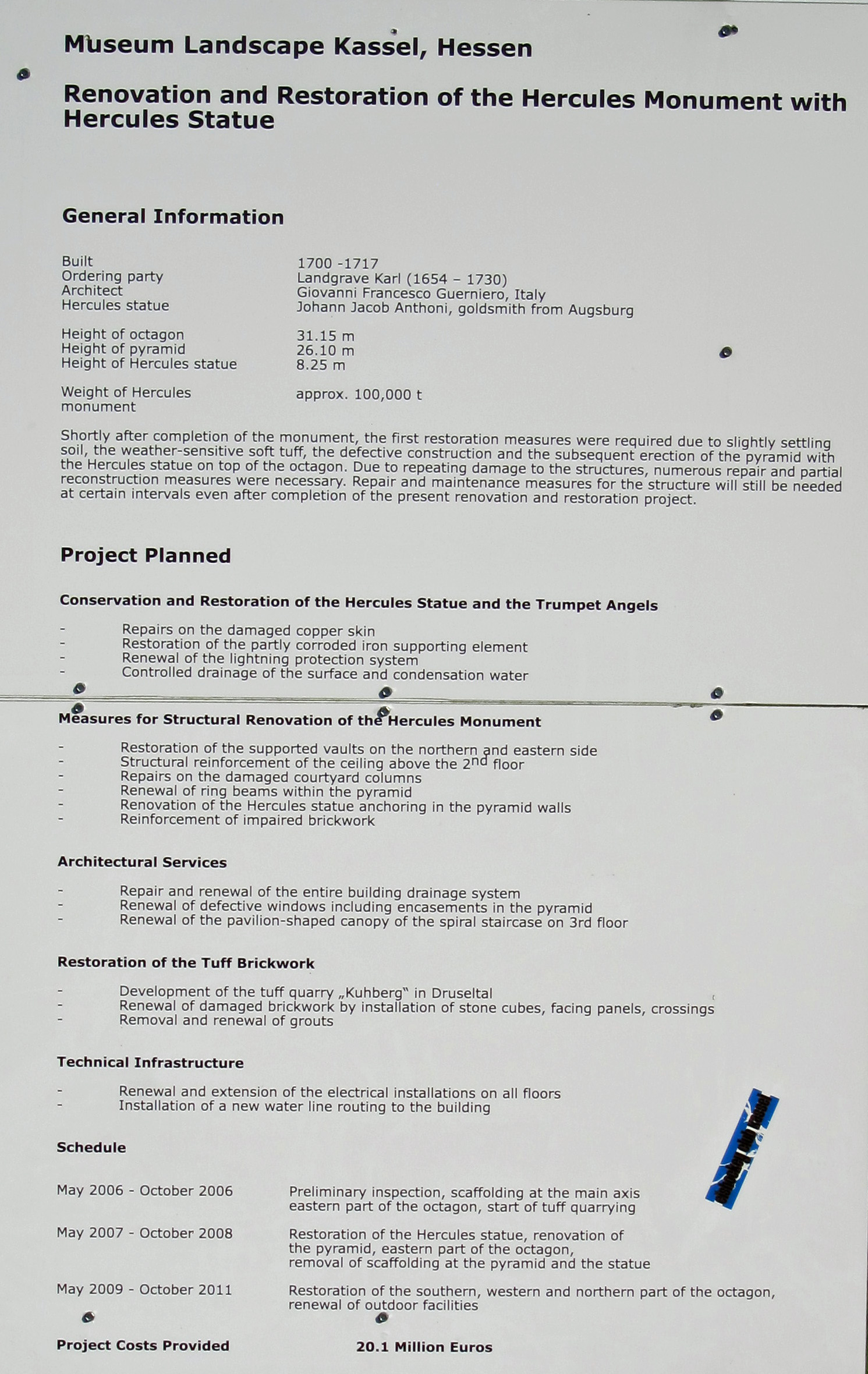
Bergpark Wilhelmshöhe, sign describing the renovation still in progress in 2013

"Wasserkunst" experienced by tourists, 2016

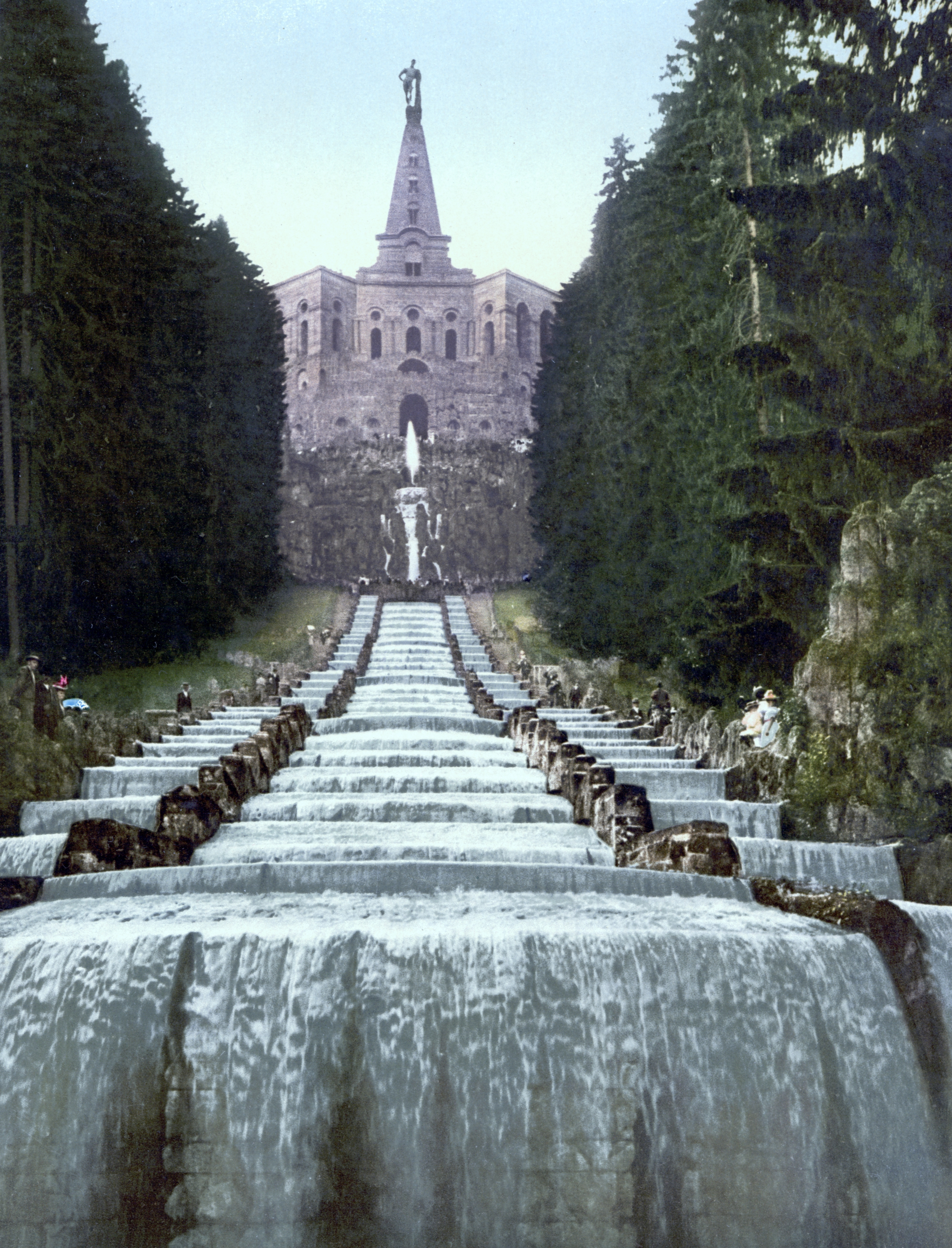
Water running down the cascades, a coloured picture before 1903
