= Wiehoff =

River in Germany

Location
- Country: Germany
- State: Hesse

Physical characteristics
- Mouth
  - location: Ems
  - coordinates: 51.2143°N 9.2775°E

Basin features
- Progression: Ems→ Eder→ Fulda→ Weser→ North Sea

Wiehoff is a river of Hesse, Germany. It flows into the Ems near Bad Emstal-Merxhausen.

== See also ==
- List of rivers of Hesse
