= Burgberg (Baunatal) =

- Location within Hesse

Highest point
- Elevation: 439.6 m (1,442 ft)
- Coordinates: 51°14′56″N 9°21′36″E

Geography
- Location: Hesse, Germany

The Burgberg (German pronunciation: [ˈbʊʁkˌbɛʁk]) is a hill in Hesse, Germany. It is situated in the municipality of Baunatal.
