= Laufskopf =

Hill in Germany

Coordinates: 51°14′N 9°20′E

Highest point
- Elevation: 556.7 m (1,826 ft)

Geography
- Location: Schwalm-Eder-Kreis, Hesse, Germany

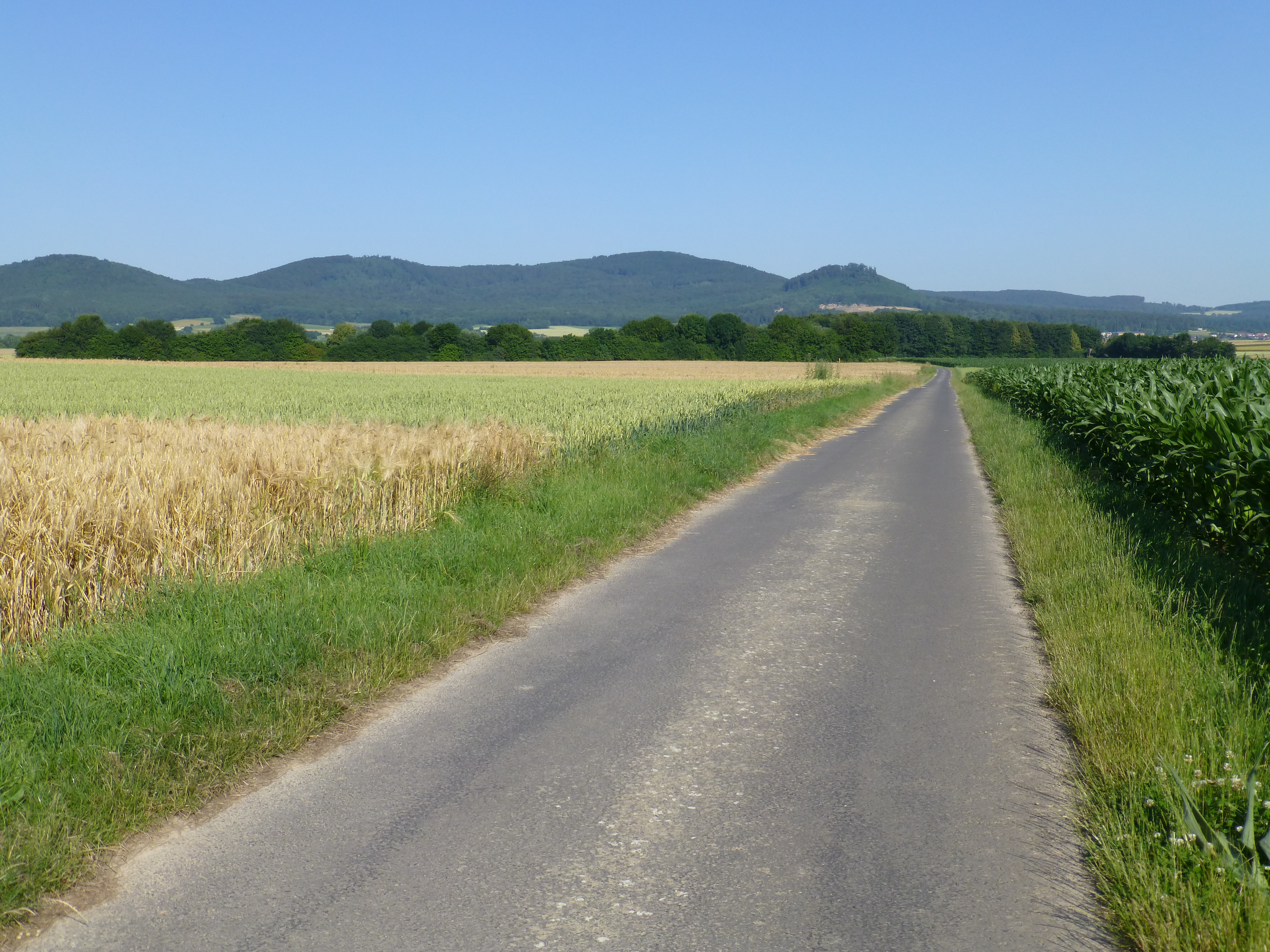
View from a roadway at the Grillhütte Hertingshausen (on the Hertingshausener Bach, near Kreisstraße 22) west-northwest to the Langenbergen: Bensberg (left), Laufskopf (midle left), Schwengeberg (mid right) and Burgberg (right)

Laufskopf is a hill in the county of Schwalm-Eder-Kreis, Hesse, Germany.
