= Sengelsberg (Böhne) =

Mountain in Germany

Coordinates: 51°12′04″N 9°07′01″E

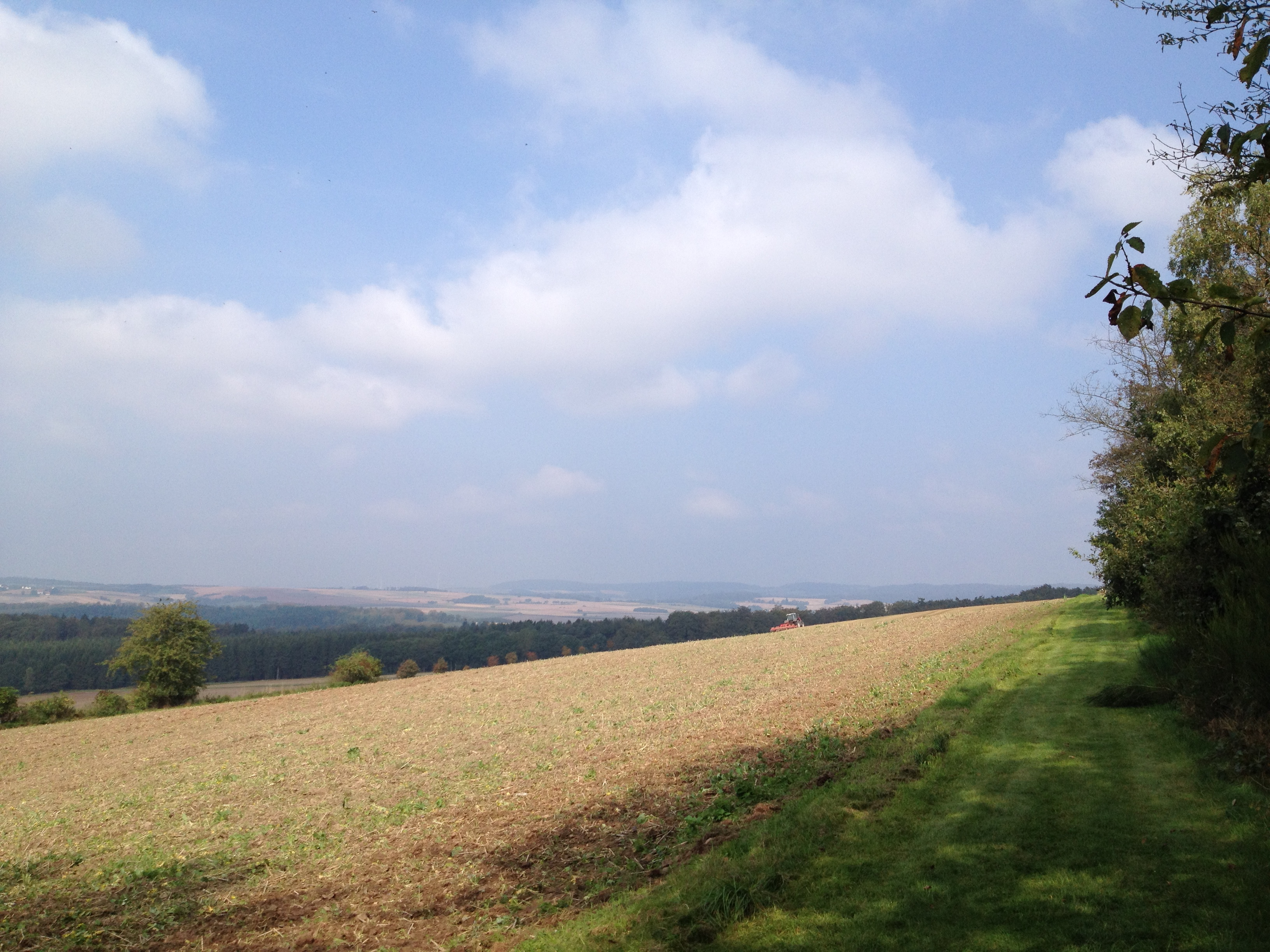
- View from Sengelsberg northwest to Netze

Highest point
- Elevation: 400 m (1,300 ft)

Geography
- Location: Landkreis Waldeck-Frankenberg, Hesse, Germany

Sengelsberg is a mountain of Landkreis Waldeck-Frankenberg, Hesse, Germany.
