= Baunsberg =

Coordinates: 51°16′N 9°25′E

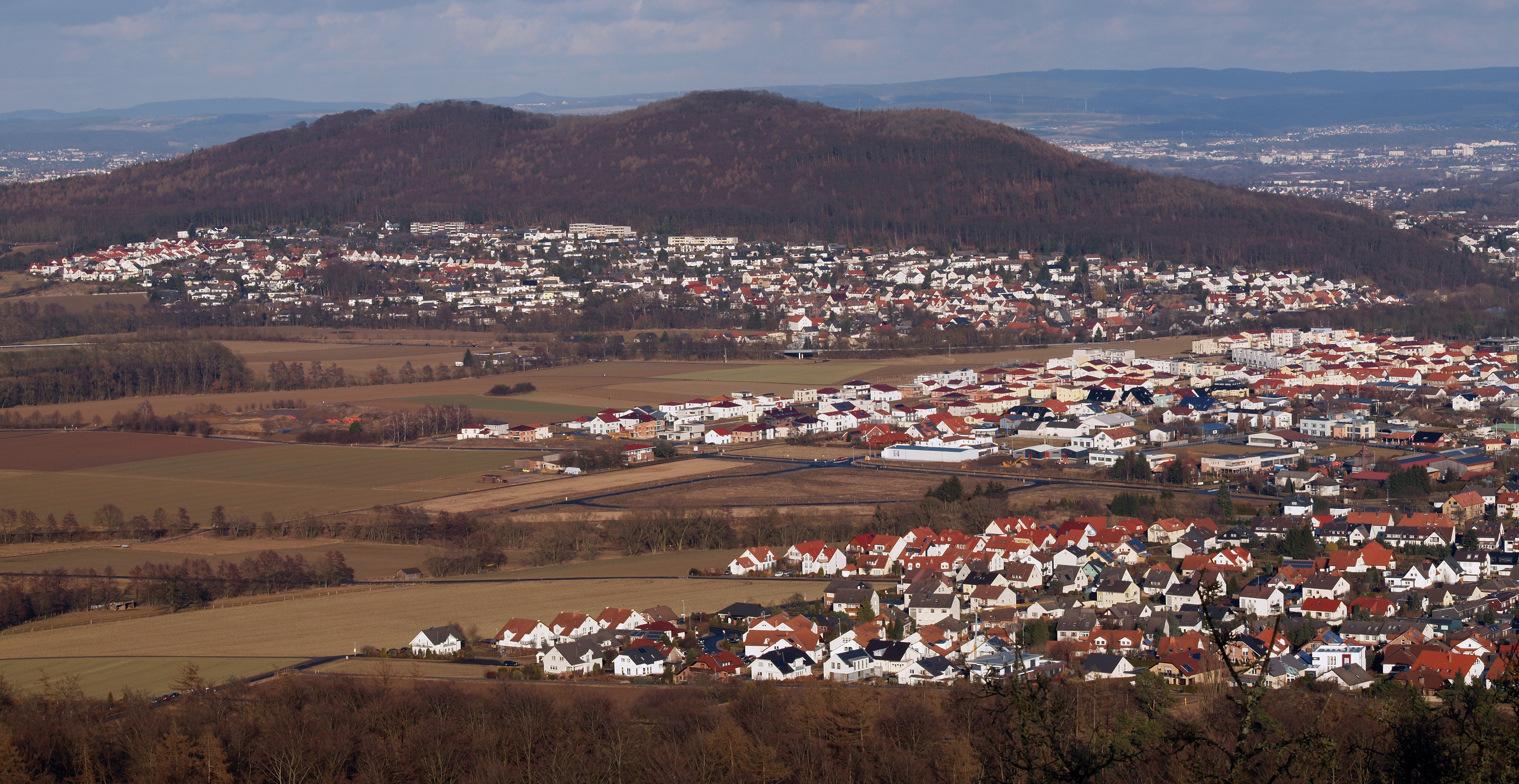
- Baunsberg.

Highest point
- Elevation: 413.4 m (1,356 ft)

Geography
- Location: Hesse, Germany

The Baunsberg is a hill in Hesse, Germany. The Baunsberg has an elevation of roughly 417 metres (1,371 feet). The coordinates for The Baunsberg are 51.268715N 9.408885E.
