= Wartberg (Niedenstein) =

Mountain in Germany

Coordinates: 51°11′32″N 9°18′15″E

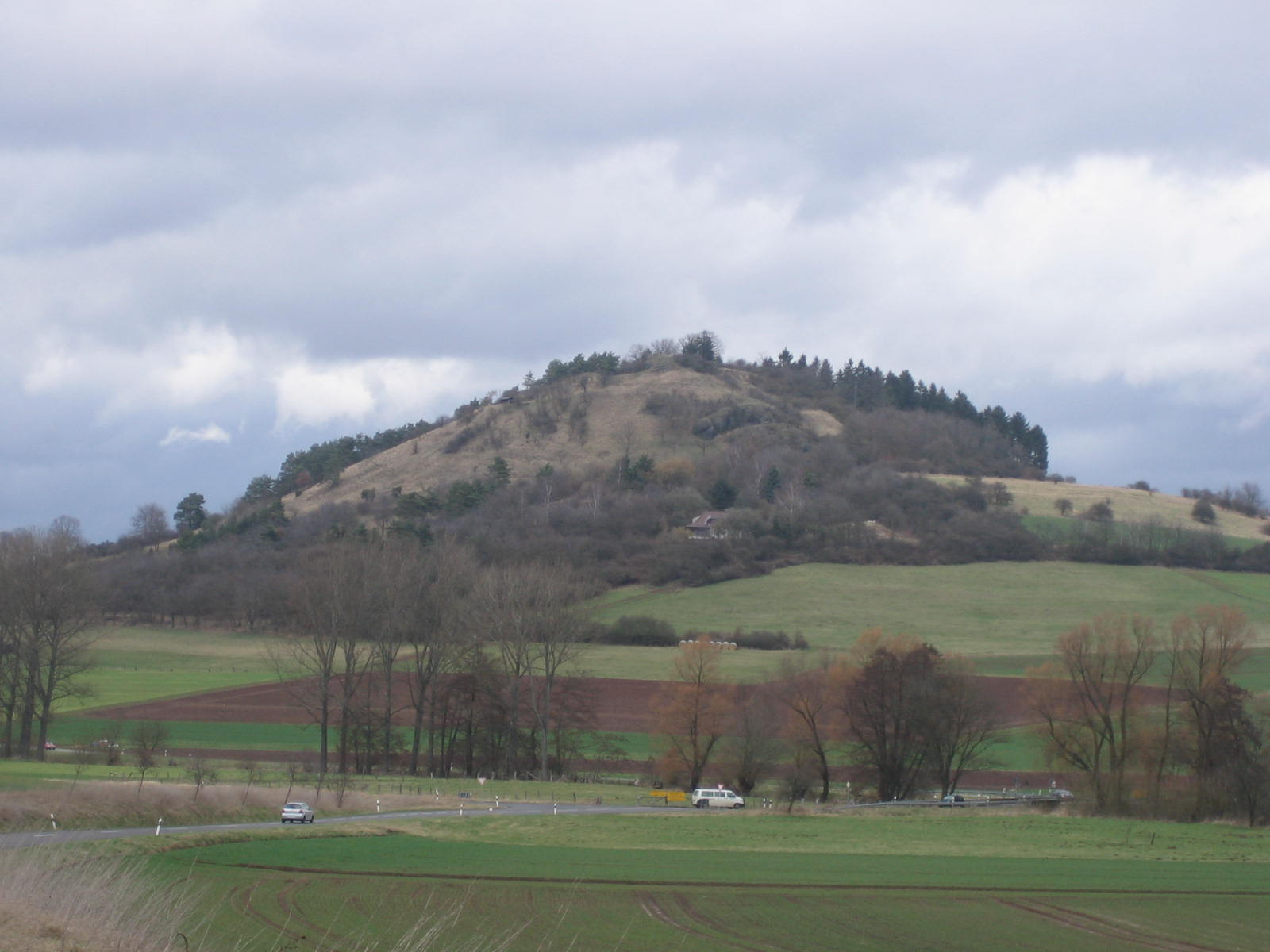
- Wartberg, with valley of the Ems in the foreground (from the south).

Highest point
- Elevation: 306 m (1,004 ft)

Geography
- Location: Schwalm-Eder-Kreis, Hesse, Germany

Wartberg is a mountain of Schwalm-Eder-Kreis, Hesse, Germany.
