= Bensberg (Langenberge) =

Hill in Germany

Coordinates: 51.2323°N 9.3525°E

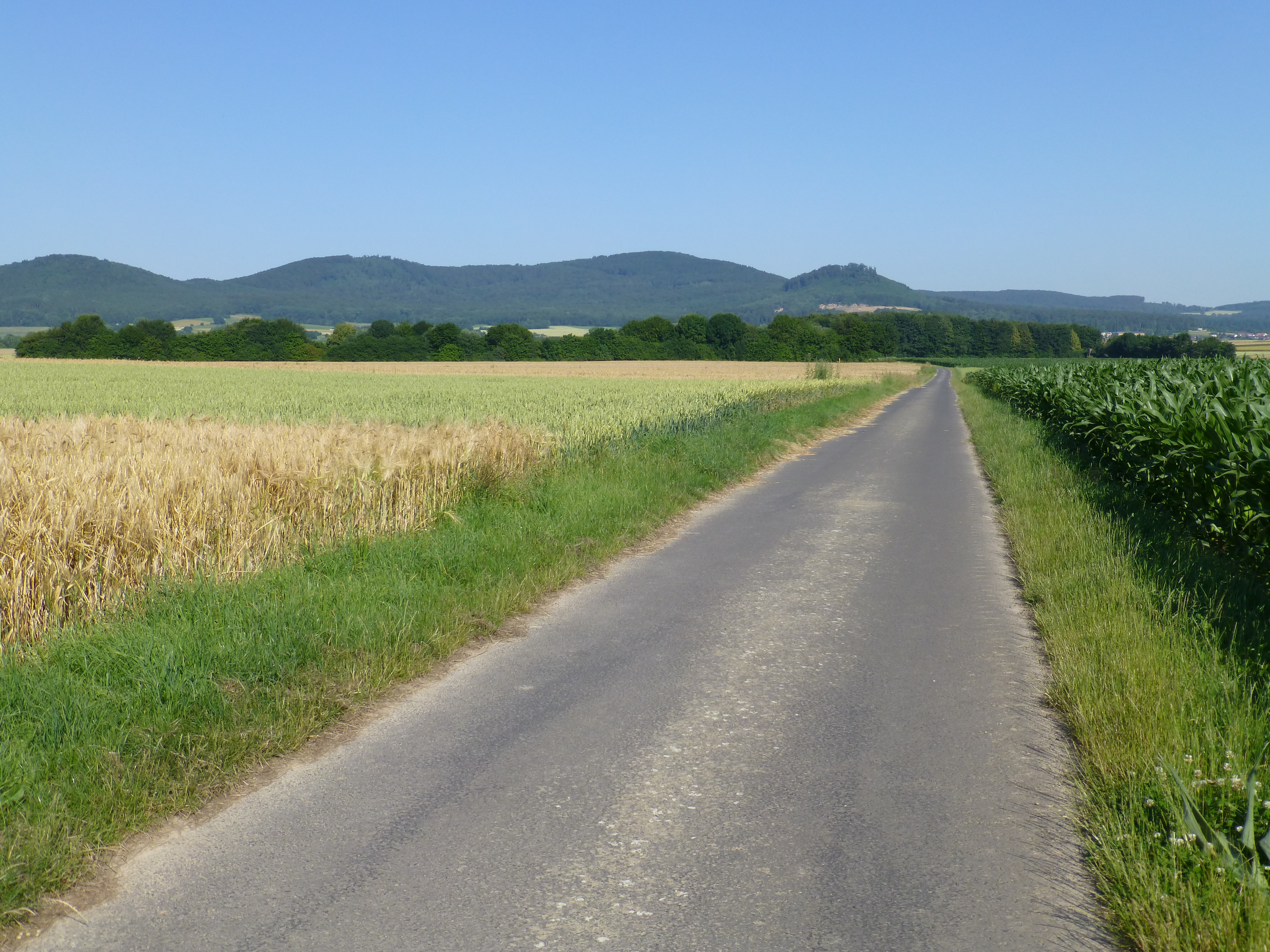
- View of Bensberg at the left of the image

Highest point
- Elevation: 460 m (1,510 ft)

Geography
- Location: Schwalm-Eder-Kreis, Hesse, Germany

The Bensberg is a hill in the county of Schwalm-Eder-Kreis, Hesse, Germany.
