= Lindenberg (Habichtswald) =

Hill in Hesse, Germany

Coordinates: 51°17′54″N 9°18′54″E

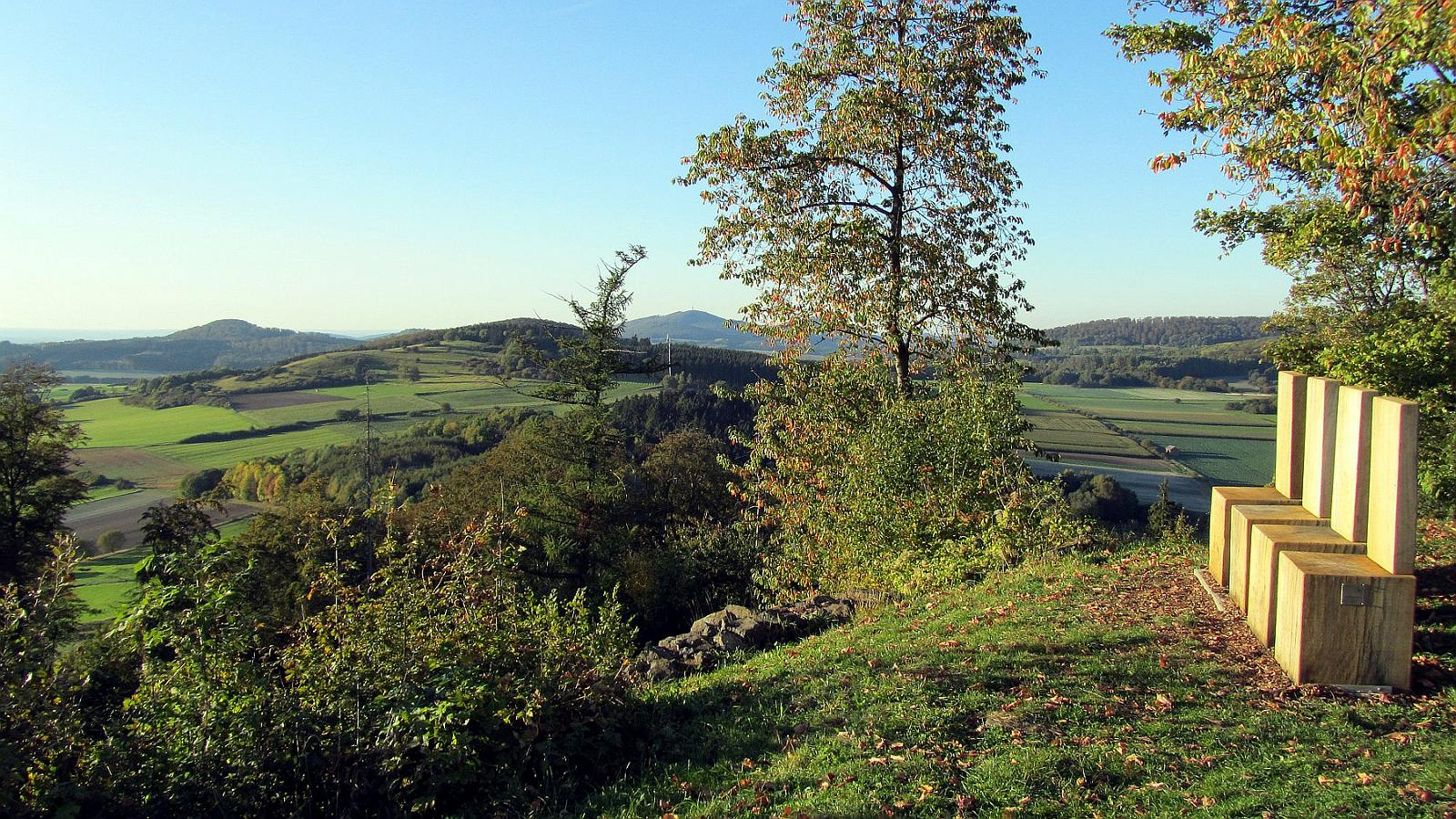

Highest point
- Elevation: 485.9 m (1,594 ft)

Geography
- Location: Hesse, Germany

Lindenberg (German pronunciation: [ˈlɪndn̩ˌbɛʁk]) is a hill of Hesse, Germany.
