= Edermünde =

- Municipality
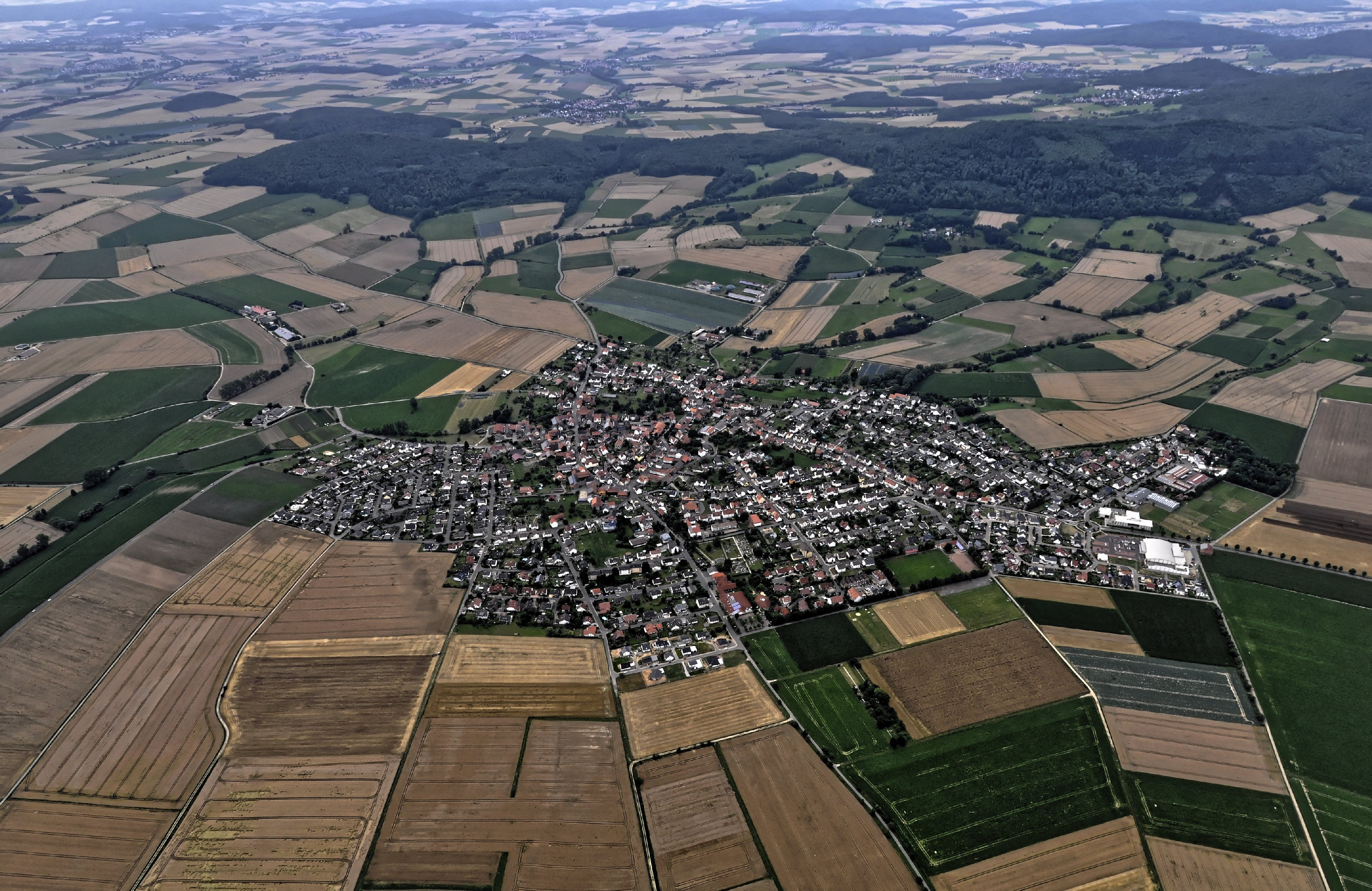
- Aerial view of Besse

- Coat of arms

- Location of Edermünde within Schwalm-Eder-Kreis district
- Interactive map of Edermünde
- Location within Germany Location within Hesse
- Coordinates: 51°12′N 09°25′E
- Country: Germany
- State: Hesse
- Admin. region: Kassel
- District: Schwalm-Eder-Kreis
- Subdivisions: 4 Ortsteile

Government
  - Mayor (2020–26): Thomas Petrich

Area
  - Total: 25.85 km^{2} (9.98 sq mi)
- Elevation: 197 m (646 ft)

Population (2025-12-31)
  - Total: 7,384
  - Density: 285.6/km^{2} (739.8/sq mi)
- Time zone: UTC+01:00 (CET)
  - Summer (DST): UTC+02:00 (CEST)
- Postal codes: 34295, 34225 (Kahler Berg)
- Dialling codes: 05665 / 05603
- Vehicle registration: HR, FZ, MEG, ZIG
- Website: edermuende.de

Edermünde (German pronunciation: [eːdɐˈmʏndə], lit. 'Eder Mouth') is a municipality in northern Hesse, Germany.

== Geography ==
=== Location ===
Edermünde lies in the north of the Schwalm-Eder district not far southwest of Kassel. This is where the river Eder empties into the river Fulda. The constituent community of Besse is nestled in the Langenberge range that rises to the west.

=== Constituent communities ===
The community consists of the centres of Besse, Grifte, Haldorf and Holzhausen am Hahn.

=== Neighbouring communities ===
Edermünde is surrounded by four neighbouring communities:

- Baunatal in the north (borders directly)
- Guxhagen in the east (across the Fulda)
- Gudensberg in the south (borders directly)
- Niedenstein in the west (across the Langenberge)

== Politics ==
=== Municipal partnerships ===
- Terenten (Terento), South Tyrol, Italy, since 1989.

== Culture and sightseeing ==
=== Museums ===
- Heimatmuseum ("Homeland Museum") in Haldorf (in former herdsman's house)
- Dorfmuseum Holzhausen ("Holzhausen Village Museum") in the DGH (Holzhausen Culture and History Club)

=== Buildings ===
- "Fortress church" in Besse

=== Natural monuments ===
- River Hahn in Holzhausen

The basalt knoll offers an outstanding view of the surrounding area. The path up to the plateau was built anew by Holzhausen citizens in the years 1999 and 2000 and is in good hiking condition.

=== Sons and daughters of the community ===
- Eckebrecht von Grifte (mediaeval military man)
