= Bauna =

River in Germany

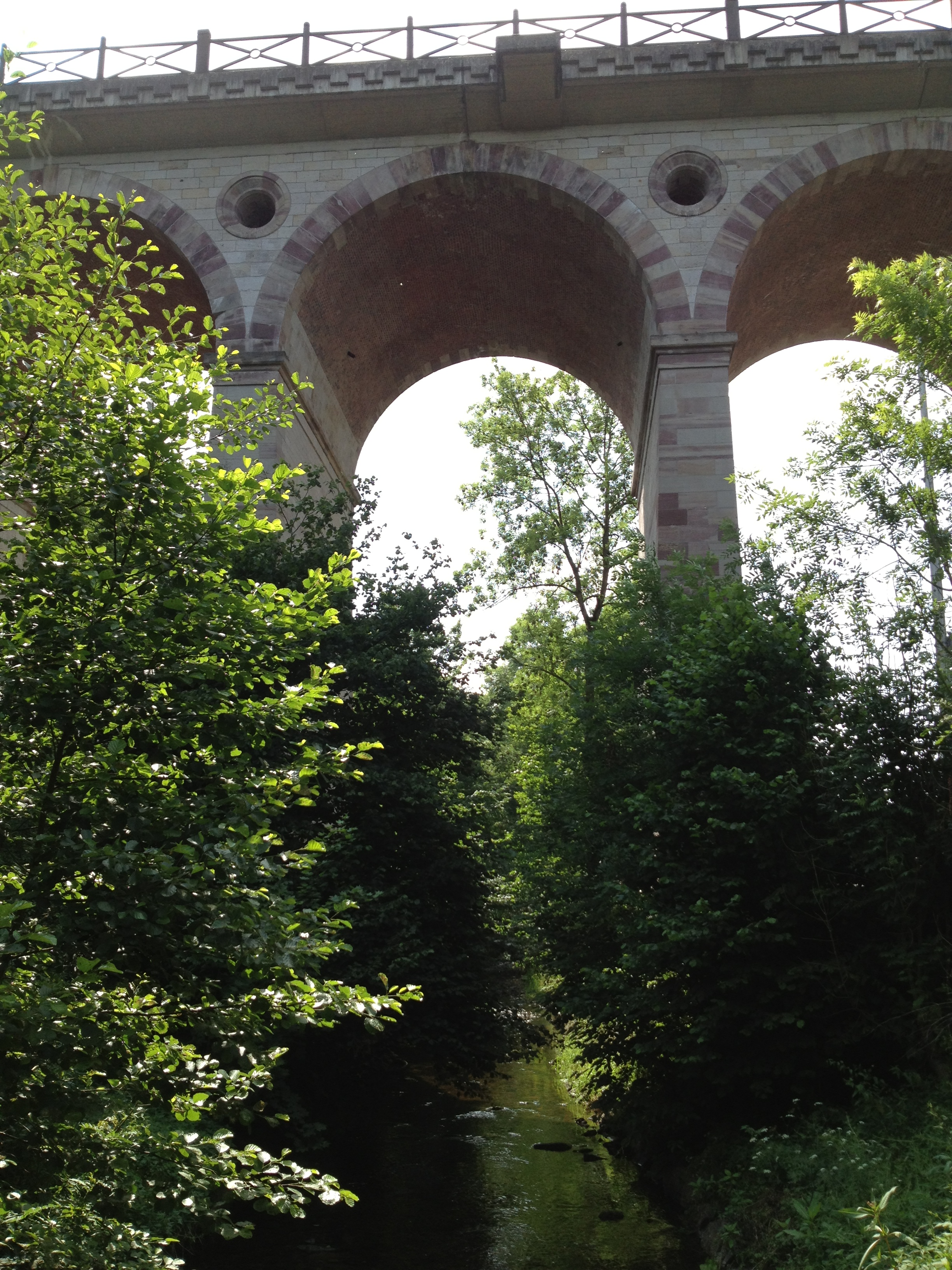
- Bauna Viaduct over the Bauna near Guntershausen

Location
- Country: Germany
- State: Hesse

Physical characteristics
- Mouth
  - location: Fulda
  - coordinates: 51.2360°N 9.4698°E
- Length: 17.2 km (10.7 mi)

Basin features
- Progression: Fulda→ Weser→ North Sea

Bauna (German pronunciation: [ˈbaʊna]) is a river of Hesse, Germany. It is a western tributary of the Fulda whose left bank it joins in Baunatal, south of Kassel.

== See also ==
- List of rivers of Hesse
