= Schwengeberg =

Mountain in Germany

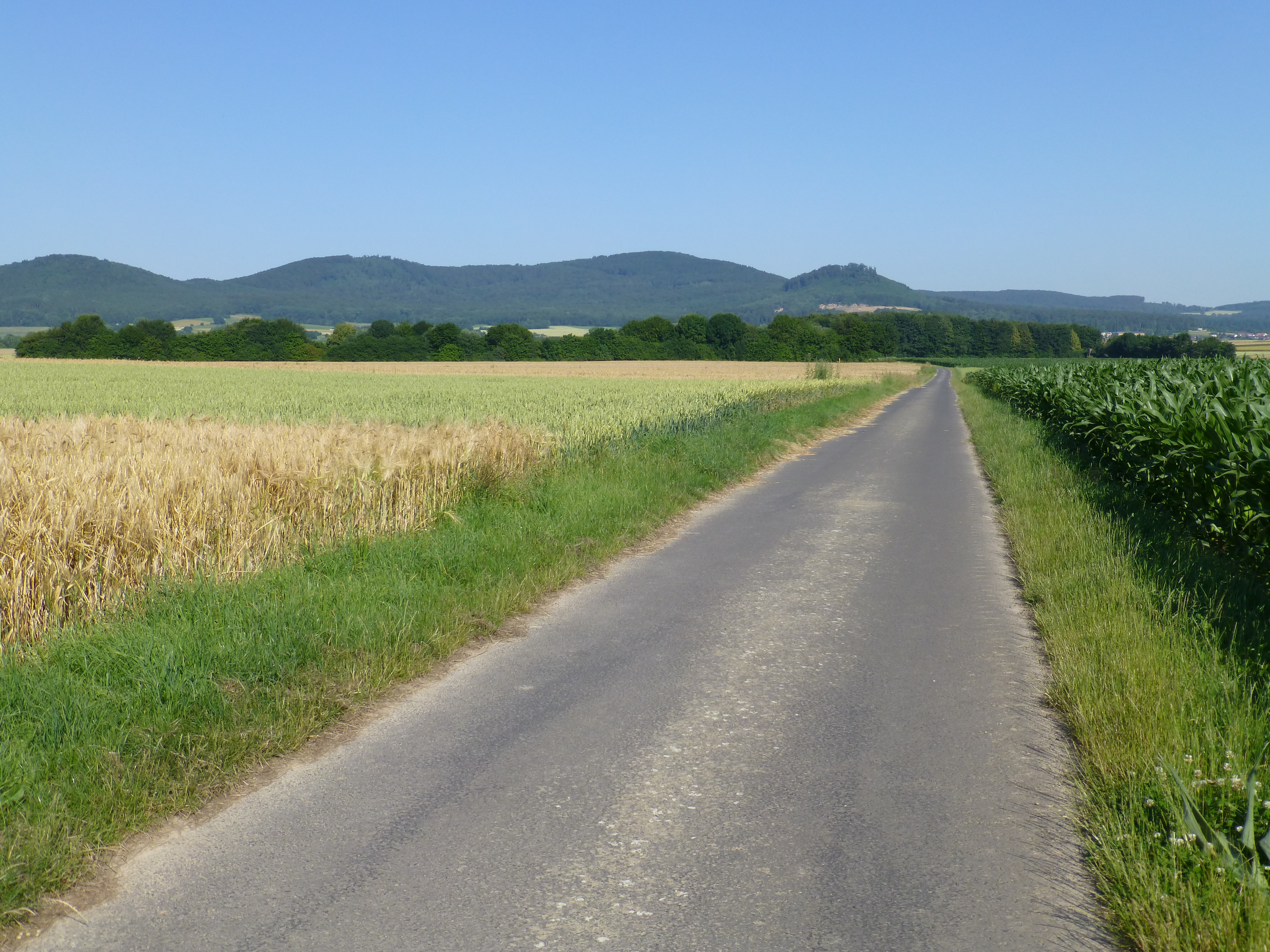
- View from a driveway at the Hertingshausen grill hut (at the Hertingshausen brook, near K 22) west-northwest to the Langenberge: Bensberg (left), Laufskopf (center left), Schwengeberg (center right) and Burgberg (right).

Highest point
- Elevation: 556.7 m (1,826 ft)
- Coordinates: 51°14′59″N 9°20′34″E

Geography
- Location: Schwalm-Eder-Kreis, Hesse, Germany

Schwengeberg is a mountain of Schwalm-Eder-Kreis, Hesse, Germany.
