= Habichtswald =

Mountain range in Germany

Coordinates: 51°18′50″N 9°22′54″E

For the town in Germany, see Habichtswald, Hesse.

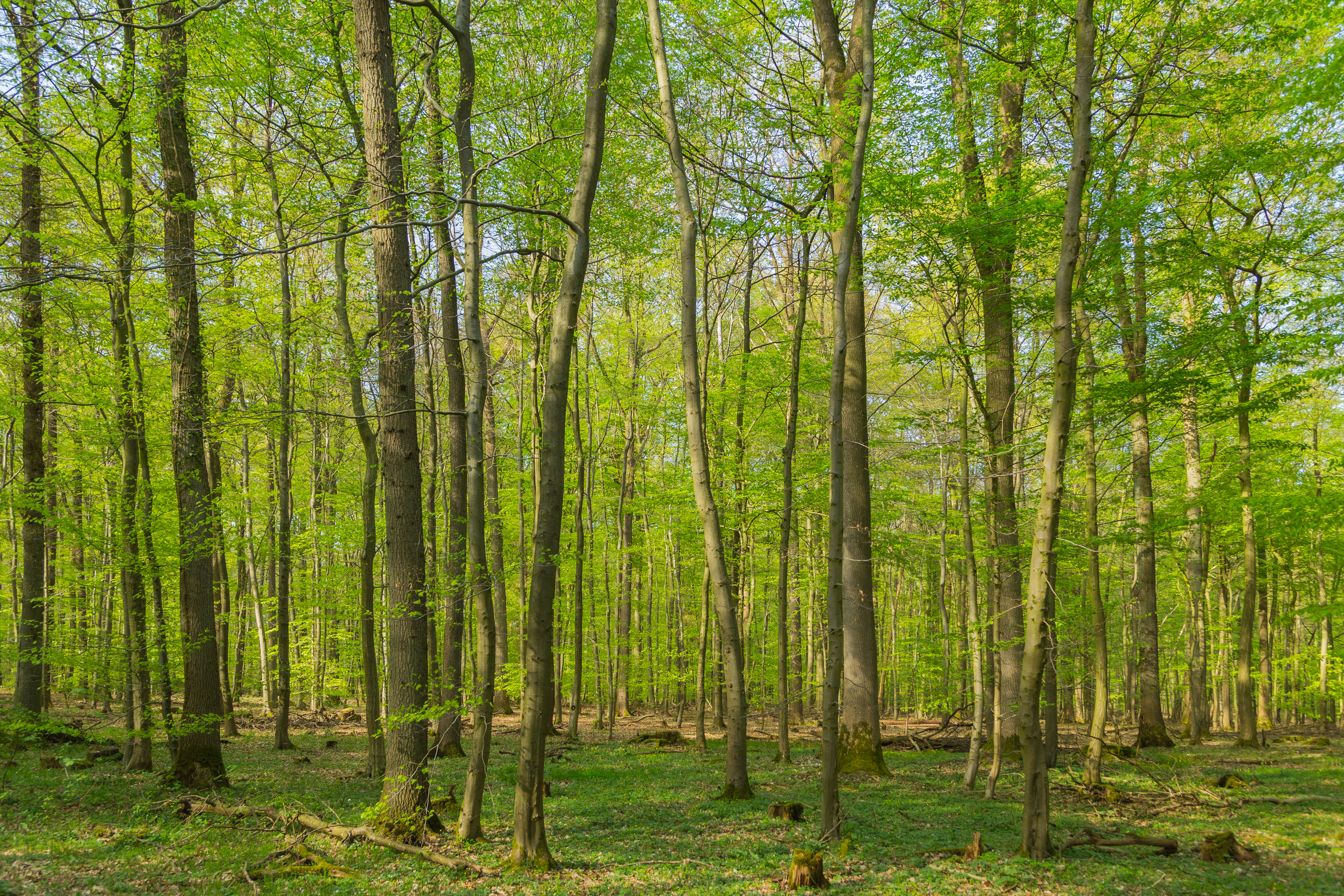
A photo taken in Habichtswald, 2018

The Habichtswald is a small mountain range, covering some 35 km^{2} and rising to a height of 615 m, immediately west of the city of Kassel in northern Hesse in Germany.

It is part of a central European volcanic arc. Tuffs from Habichtswald have been used as building-stone material in local churches.

The bulk of the range is a nature reserve. The remainder lies within the city limits of Kassel and is partly settled. The castle and park of Wilhelmshöhe are located within the Habichtswald.
