= Ems (Eder) =

River in Germany

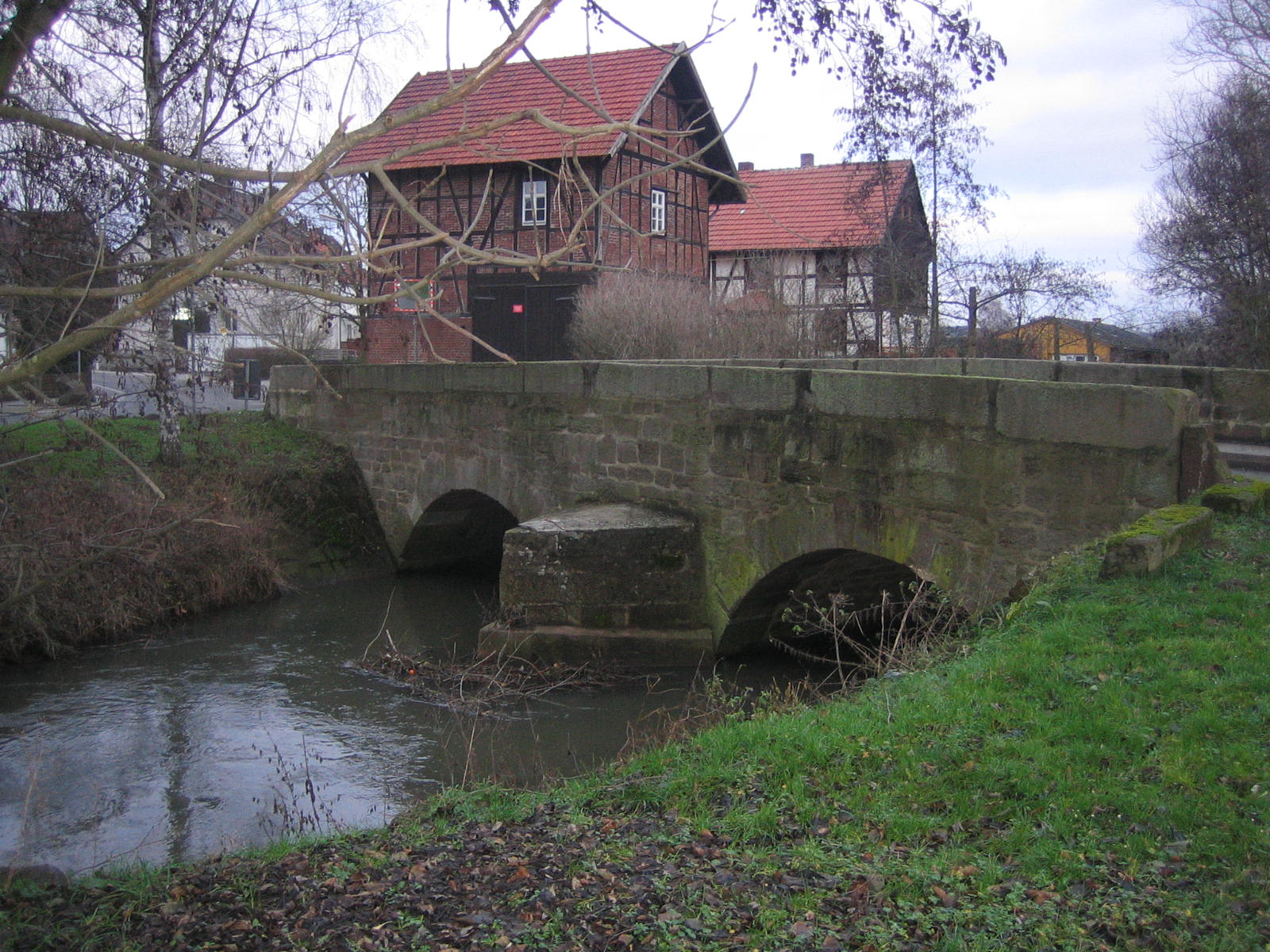

Location
- Country: Germany
- State: Hesse

Physical characteristics
- Mouth
  - location: Eder
  - coordinates: 51.1557°N 9.4389°E
- Length: 34.1 km (21.2 mi)
- Basin size: 146 km^{2} (56 sq mi)

Basin features
- Progression: Eder→ Fulda→ Weser→ North Sea

Ems is a river of Hesse, Germany. It flows into the Eder near Brunslar.

== See also ==
- List of rivers of Hesse
