= List of mountains and hills of the Rhenish Massif =

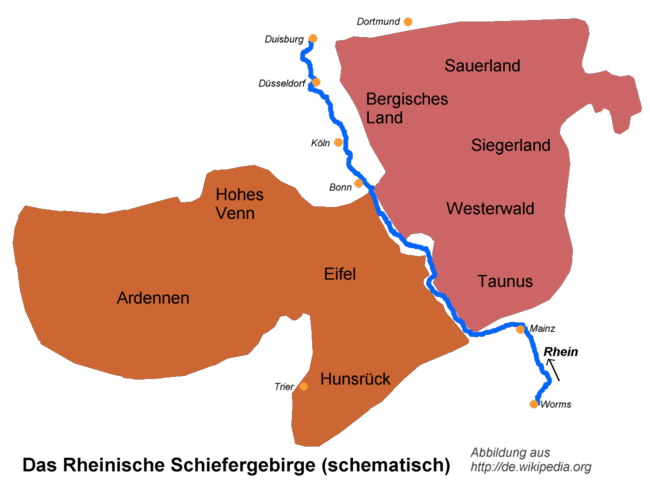

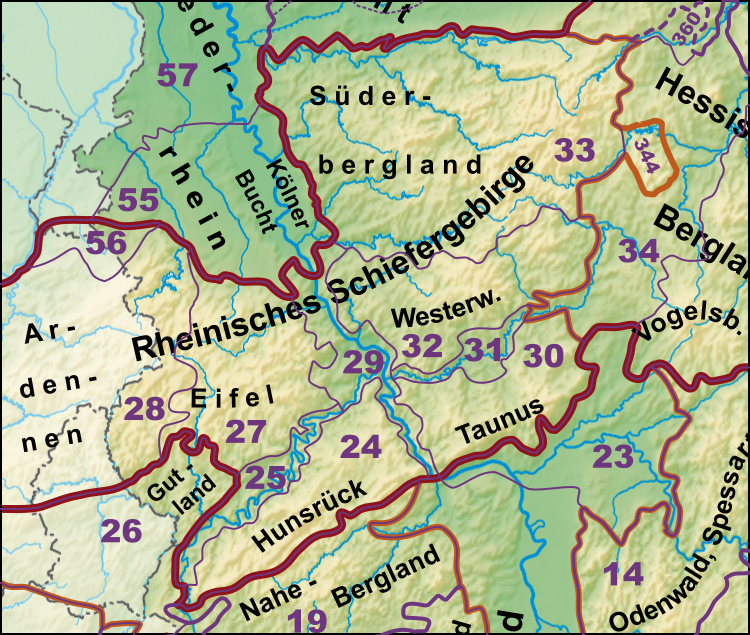
Rhenish Massif (with elements of neighbouring landscapes):
– Highest points in the sub-ranges and several neighbouring landscapes
– several river/-mouth elevations
– Four largest reservoirs
– Most important cities
heights in metres (m) above sea level (NHN)

This list of mountains and hills of the Rhenish Massif (German: Rheinisches Schiefergebirge: "Rhenish Slate Mountains") is a selection of the mountains, hills and foothills of the ranges and landscapes that form the Rhenish Massif − sorted by natural regional main unit groups and heights in metres (m) above sea level (NHN).

See also these lists:
– Mountains of Hesse
– Mountains and hills of North Rhine-Westphalia
– Mountains and hills of Rhineland-Palatinate
– Mountains and hills of the Saarland

An explanation of the abbreviations used is given below.

== Ardennes ==
The Ardennes lie in Belgium, with foothills in France and Luxembourg.

- Baraque de Fraiture (652 m), Province of Luxembourg (B)
- Cairn Roy Albert (589 m), Province of Luxembourg (B)
- Hochtumsknopf (Hüttensknipp; 510 m), Province of Liege (B)
- Croix Scaille (505 m), Province of Namur (B)

== Eifel ==
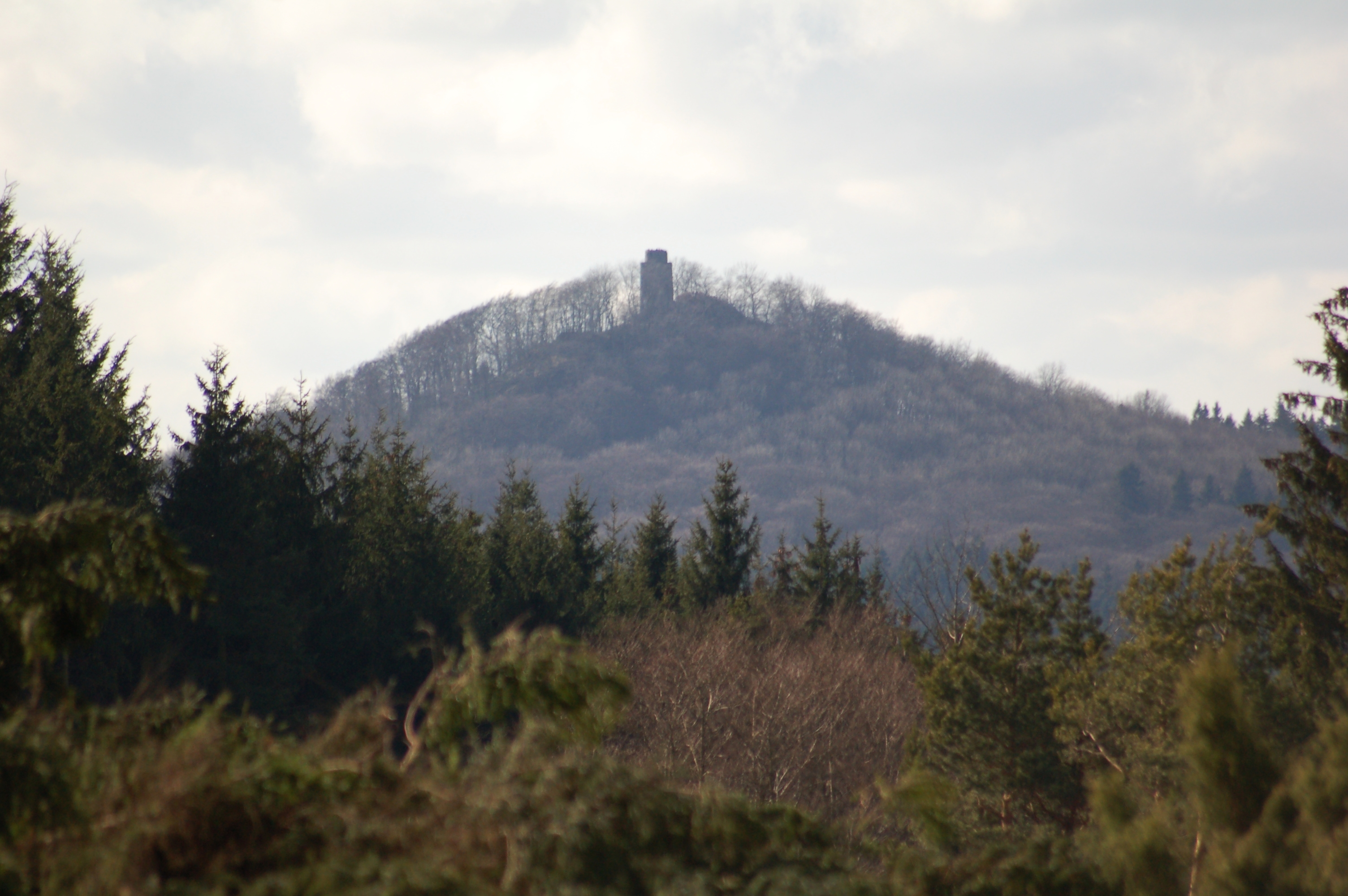
The Hohe Acht

The Eifel lies in Germany with foothills in Belgium and Luxembourg.

→ main article: List of mountains and hills of the Eifel

- Hohe Acht (746.9 m), High Eifel (RP)
- Ernstberg (699.8 m), Vulkan Eifel (RP)
- unnamed peak (near Schwarzer Mann; 699.1 m), Schnee Eifel (RP)
- Schwarzer Mann (697.8 m), Schnee Eifel (RP)
- Botrange (694.24 m), High Fens (B)
- Weißer Stein (693 m), North Eifel (NW / B)
- Scharteberg (691.4 m), Vulkan Eifel (RP)
- Nürburg (ca. 678 m), High Eifel (RP)
- Hochkelberg (674.9 m), High Eifel (RP)
- Raßberg (663.8 m), High Eifel (RP)
- Steling (658.3 m), High Fens (NW / B)
- Giescheid (652 m), North Eifel (NW)
- Nerother Kopf (651.7 m), Vulkan Eifel (RP)
- Aremberg (623.8 m), Ahr Hills (RP)
- Hardtkopf (601.5 m), South Eifel (RP)
- Michelsberg (586.1 m), Ahr Hills (NW)
- Eigart (565.5 m), North Eifel (NW)
- Rockeskyller Kopf (554.6 m), Vulkan Eifel (RP)
- Hoher List (549.1 m), Vulkan Eifel (RP)
- Wildbretshügel (525.3 m), North Eifel/Rur Eifel (NW)
- Herkelstein (434.5 m), North Eifel (NW)
- Veitskopf (428.1), Vulkan Eifel (RP)
- Burgberg (400.8), Rur Eifel, North Eifel (NW)
- Sonnenberg (393.3 m), Rur Eifel (NW)
- Calmont (378.4 m), Anterior Eifel (RP)
- Bausenberg (339.8 m), North Eifel (RP)
- Landskrone (271.7 m), Ahr Hills (RP)

== High Fens ==
The High Fens lie in Belgium with foothills in Germany.

- Botrange (694.24 m), Province of Liege (B)
- Pannensterzkopf (Bovel; ca. 662 m), Province of Liege (B)
- Hühnerhöhe (659.9 m), county of Euskirchen (North Rhine-Westphalia)
- Steling (658.3 m), county of Aachen (North Rhine-Westphalia) / Province of Liege (B)
- Hahnheister (636.3 m), county of Aachen (North Rhine-Westphalia) / Province of Liege (B)
- Hohe Mark (ca. 609 m), Province of Liege (B)

== Hunsrück ==
The Hunsrück lies in Rhineland-Palatinate with foothills in the Saarland.

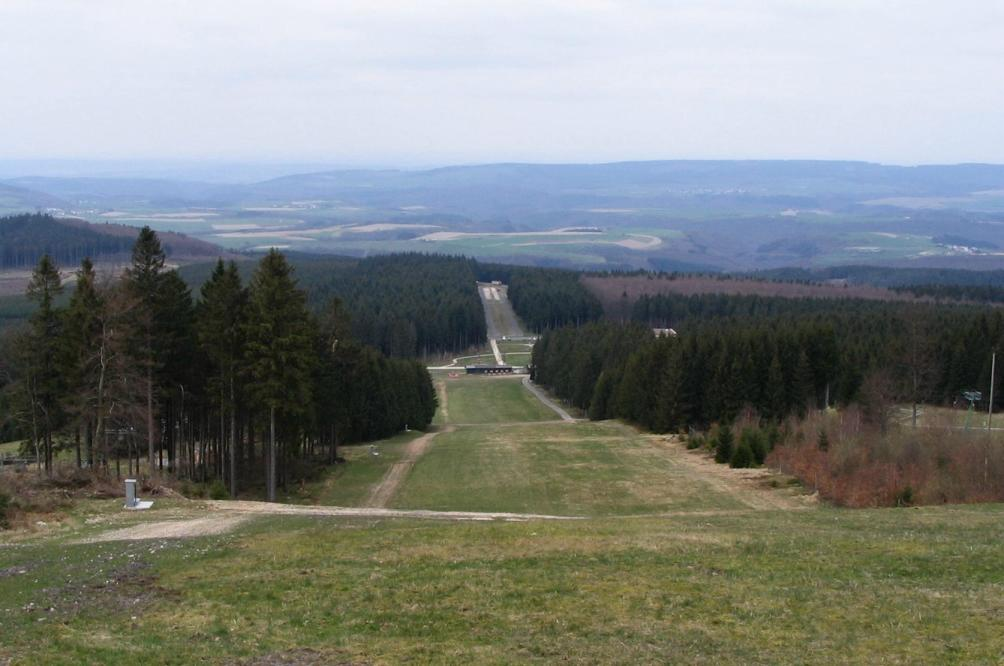
View from the Erbeskopf

- Erbeskopf (816.32 m), Schwarzwälder Hochwald (RP)
- An den zwei Steinen (766.2 m), Idar Forest
- Kahlheid (766.0 m), Idar Forest(RP)
- Ruppelstein (762.7 m), Schwarzwälder Hochwald (RP)
- Sandkopf (757.4 m), Schwarzwälder Hochwald (RP)
- Steingerüttelkopf (756.6 m), Idarwald (RP)
- Idarkopf (745.7 m), Idar Forest(RP)
- Usarkopf (725.4 m), Idar Forest(RP)
- Rösterkopf (708.1 m), Osburger Hochwald (RP)
- Friedrichskopf (707.4 m), Schwarzwälder Hochwald (RP)
- Dollberg (695.4 m), Schwarzwälder Hochwald (RP, SL)
- Teufelskopf (695.0 m), Schwarzwälder Hochwald (RP)
- Schimmelkopf (694.8 m), Schwarzwälder Hochwald (RP, SL)
- Mückenbornberg (692.6), Schwarzwälder Hochwald (RP)
- Hohe Wurzel (668.9 m), Osburger Hochwald (RP)
- Ellerspring (656.8 m), Soonwald – source of the Ellerbach (RP)
- Simmerkopf (653.0 m), Soonwald (RP)
- Ringkopf (650.1 m), Idar Forest(RP)
- Hochsteinchen (648.3 m), Soonwald (RP)
- Schanzerkopf (643.5 m), Soonwald (RP)
- Kandrich (638.6 m), Bingen Forest (RP)
- Wildburghöhe (633.5 m), Soonwald (RP)
- Alteburg (620.5 m), Soonwald (RP)
- Womrather Höhe (599.1 m), Lützelsoon (RP)
- Koppensteiner Höhe (554.9 m), Soonwald (RP)

== Kellerwald ==
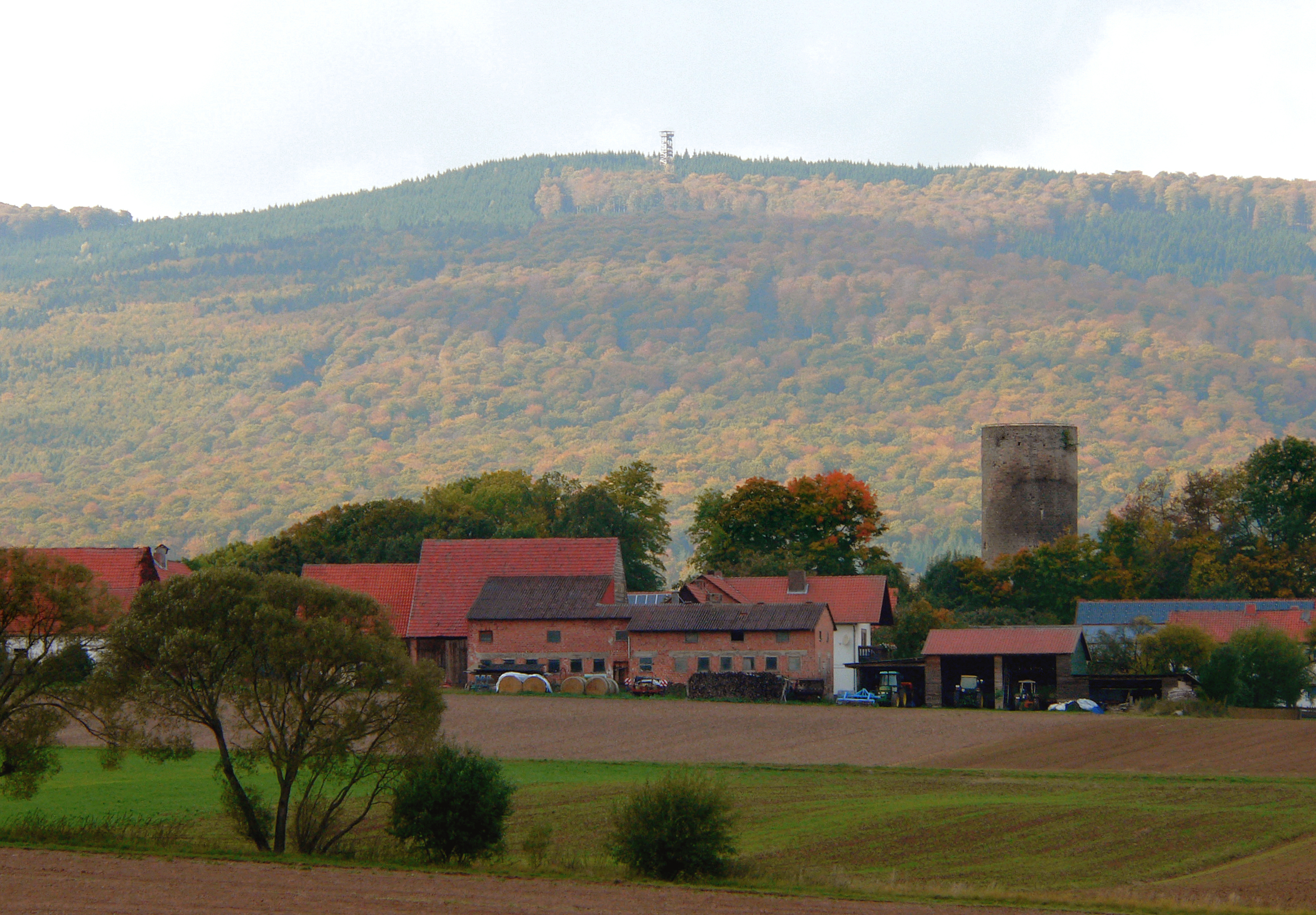
Wüstegarten

The Kellerwald lies entirely within Hesse.

→ main article: List of mountains and hills of the Kellerwald

- Wüstegarten (675.3 m), county of Waldeck-Frankenberg, Schwalm-Eder-Kreis
- Hohes Lohr (656.7 m), county of Waldeck-Frankenberg
- Große Aschkoppe (639.8 m), county of Waldeck-Frankenberg
- Hunsrück (635.9 m), Schwalm-Eder-Kreis
- Traddelkopf (626.4 m), county of Waldeck-Frankenberg
- Auenberg (610.7 m), county of Waldeck-Frankenberg
- Jeust (ca. 585 m), county of Waldeck-Frankenberg, Schwalm-Eder-Kreis
- Sauklippe (584.4 m), Schwalm-Eder-Kreis
- Talgang (566.1 m), county of Waldeck-Frankenberg
- Homberg (518.5 m), county of Waldeck-Frankenberg
- Peterskopf (506.6 m), county of Waldeck-Frankenberg
- Hundskopf (470.6 m), Schwalm-Eder-Kreis
- Rabenstein (439.3 m), county of Waldeck-Frankenberg
- Keseberg (431.2 m), county of Waldeck-Frankenberg
- Uhrenkopf (ca. 405 m), county of Waldeck-Frankenberg

== Süder Uplands ==
The Süder Uplands (Süderbergland) comprise inter alia the historic regions of the Sauerland, Upland, Siegerland, Wittgenstein Land, Bergisches Land and parts of the Hessian Hinterland.

=== Rothaar Mountains ===
The subdivisions of the Rothaar is based largely on historic regions. It lies in North Rhine-Westphalia with foothills in Hesse.

→ main article: List of mountains and hills of the Rothaar

==== Sauerland and Upland ====
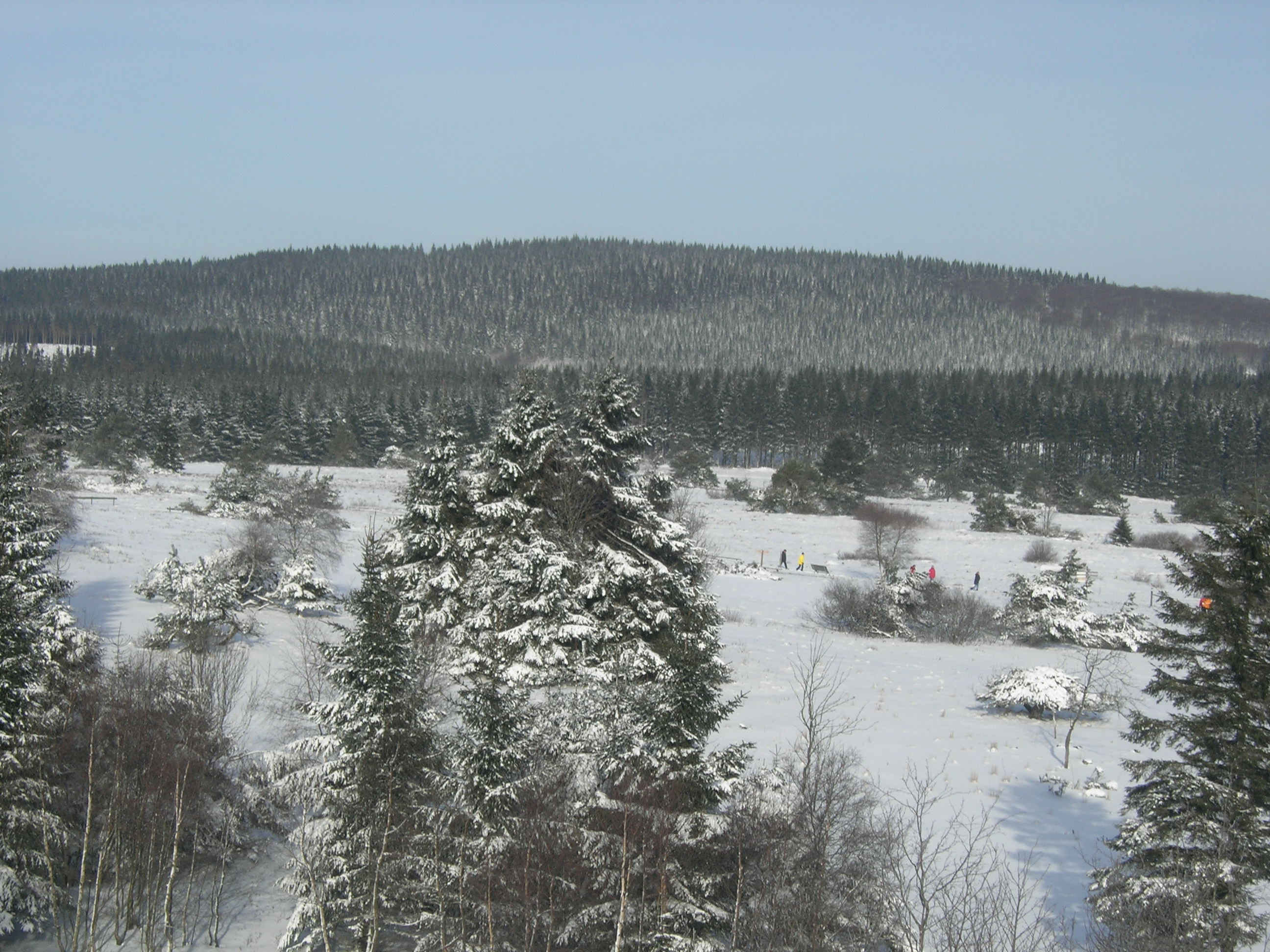
Langenberg in winter

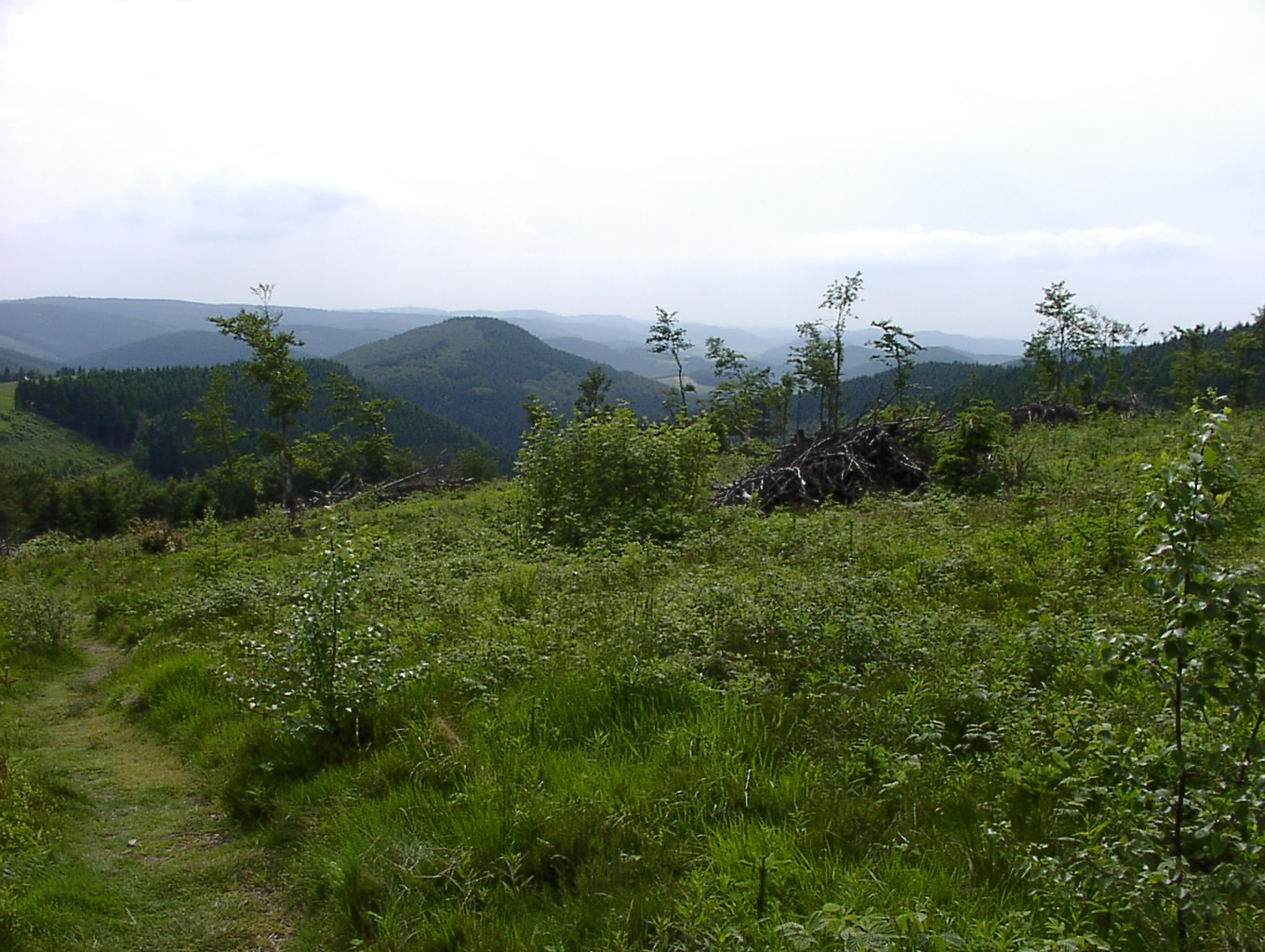
View of the Kahler Asten

The following mountains in the highest area of the Rothaar Mountains are those belonging to the historic Upland which lies in the Hessian county of Waldeck-Frankenberg.

→ see also section: Mountains in the article on Upland

- Langenberg (843.2 m), counties of Hochsauerlandkreis (NW) and Waldeck-Frankenberg (HE)
- Hegekopf (842.9 m), county of Waldeck-Frankenberg (HE)
- Kahler Asten (841.9 m), Hochsauerlandkreis, Rothaar Mountains (NW)
- Ettelsberg (837.7 m), county of Waldeck-Frankenberg (HE)
- Clemensberg (837 m), Hochsauerlandkreis (NW)
- Hopperkopf (832.3 m), counties of Hochsauerlandkreis and Waldeck-Frankenberg (NW, HE)
- Mühlenkopf (ca. 815 m), county of Waldeck-Frankenberg (HE)
- Hunau (818.5 m), Hochsauerlandkreis (NW)
- Ziegenhelle (815.9 m), Hochsauerlandkreis (NW)
- Wallershöhe (812.1 m), Hochsauerlandkreis (NW)
- Bremberg (ca. 810 m), Hochsauerlandkreis (NW)
- Hoher Eimberg (806.1 m), counties of Hochsauerlandkreis and Waldeck-Frankenberg (NW, HE)
- Hoppernkopf (805.0 m), counties of Hochsauerlandkreis and Waldeck-Frankenberg (NW, HE)
- Hillekopf (804.9 m), Hochsauerlandkreis (NW)
- Mittelsberg (801.0 m), county of Waldeck-Frankenberg (HE)
- Reetsberg (792.2 m), Hochsauerlandkreis (NW)
- Schlossberg (791.3 m), Hochsauerlandkreis (NW)
- Bollerberg (757.7 m), Hochsauerlandkreis (NW)
- Härdler (756.3 m), county of Olpe (NW)

==== Wittgenstein Land ====
The Wittgenstein Land lies entirely within North Rhine-Westphalia.

- Albrechtsberg (768 m), county of Siegen-Wittgenstein
- Hohe Hessel (742.8 m), county of Siegen-Wittgenstein
- Großer Kopf (740 m), county of Siegen-Wittgenstein
- Kompass (694.1 m), county of Siegen-Wittgenstein
- Ebschloh (686.3 m), county of Siegen-Wittgenstein

==== Siegerland (historic) ====
The historic Siegerland (not to be confused with the natural region of Siegerland) lies entirely within North Rhine-Westphalia:

→ see also section: Hills in the article on Siegerland

- Riemen (677.7 m), county of Siegen-Wittgenstein
- Aukopf (644.9 m), county of Siegen-Wittgenstein
- Giller (653.5 m), county of Siegen-Wittgenstein
- Kindelsberg (618.1 m), county of Siegen-Wittgenstein

==== Hessians Hinterland ====
The Hessian Hinterland lies entirely within Hesse.

- Sackpfeife (673.5 m), counties of Marburg-Biedenkopf and Waldeck-Frankenberg (HE)
- Rimberg (495.1 m), county of Marburg-Biedenkopf

=== South Sauerland Highland ===
==== Saalhausen Hills ====
The Saalhausen Hills lie entirely within North Rhine-Westphalia.

→ see also section: Hills in the article on Saalhausen Hills

- Himberg (688.5 m), county of Hochsauerlandkreis (NW)
- Hoher Lehnberg (668.8 m), county of Olpe (NW)
- Jürgensberg (619.2 m), county of Olpe (NW)
- Beerenberg (614.1 m), county of Hochsauerlandkreis (NW)

==== Ebbe Mountains ====
The Ebbe Mountains lies entirely within North Rhine-Westphalia.

→ see also section: Hills in the article on Ebbe Mountains

- Nordhelle (663.3 m), county of Märkischer Kreis
- Waldberg (ca. 638 m), county of Märkischer Kreis
- Homert (538.3 m), county of Märkischer Kreis

==== Lenne Mountains ====
The Lenne Mountains lies entirely within North Rhine-Westphalia.

→ see also section: Hills in the article on Lenne Mountains

- Homert (656.1 m), county of Hochsauerlandkreis
- Schomberg (647.6 m), county of Hochsauerlandkreis
- Großes Sonnenstück (686.8 m), county of Hochsauerlandkreis
- Dümberg (575.5 m), county of Hochsauerlandkreis

==== Mittelbigge Upland ====
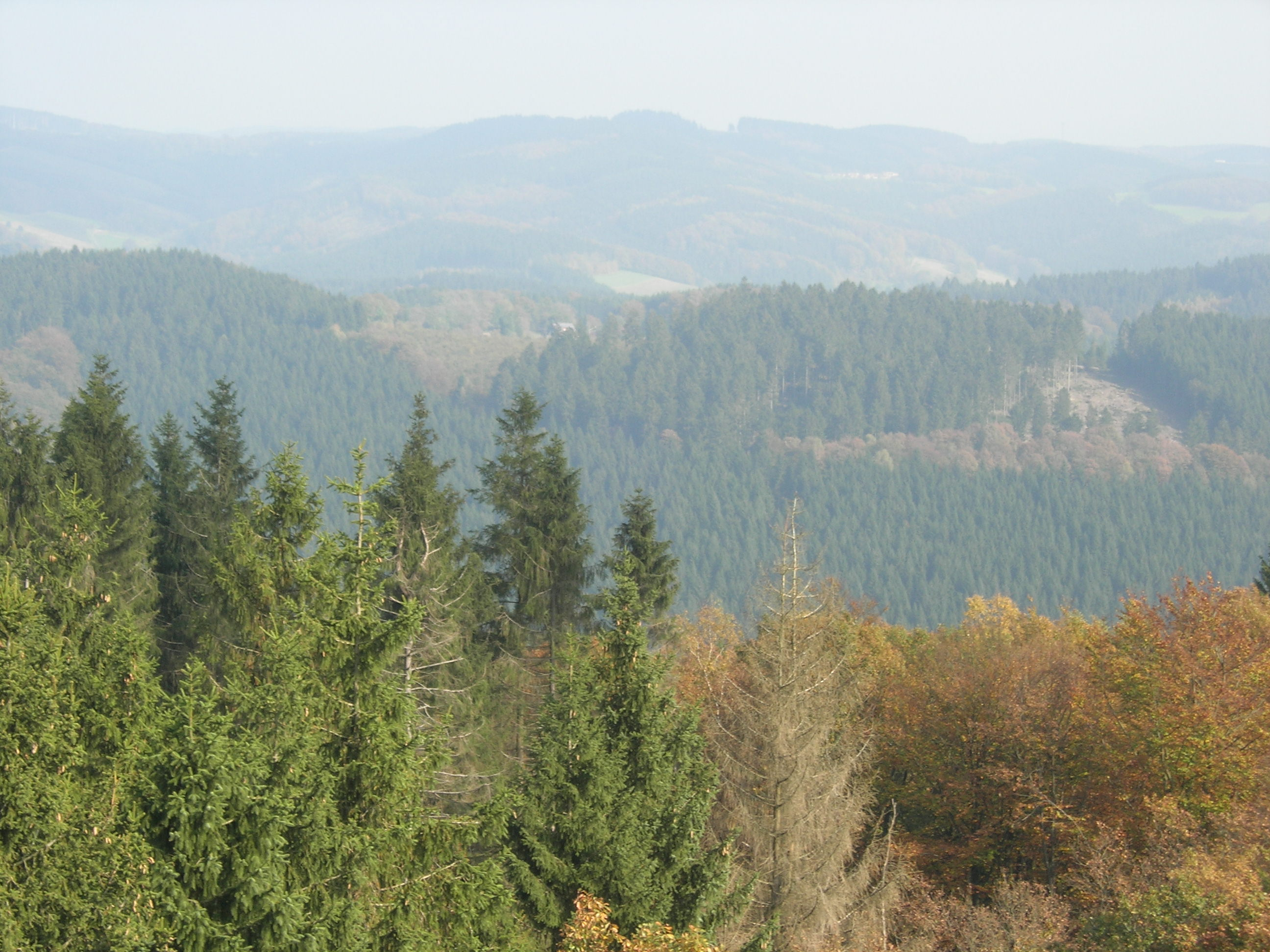
Homert

- Rammskopf (523.1 m), county of Märkischer Kreis
- Homert (519 m), county of Oberbergischer Kreis
- Horst (514.9 m), county of Märkischer Kreis
- Eulenberg (497.1 m), county of Märkischer Kreis
- Sonnenberg (458.5 m), county of Olpe
- Nordhelle (437.2), county of Märkischer Kreis
- Bracht (429.1 m), county of Olpe
- Rappelsberg (410.7 m), county of Olpe
- Gilberg (360.0 m), county of Olpe

=== Siegerland (natural region) ===
The natural region of Siegerland (not to be confused with the historic Siegerland) lies entirely within North Rhine-Westphalia:

→ see also section: Mountains in the article on Siegerland (natural region)

- Alte Burg (633.0 m), county of Siegen-Wittgenstein, (NW)
- Lipper Nürr (616.9 m), county of Altenkirchen (RP), county of Siegen-Wittgenstein (NW)
- Sanktkopf (ca. 606 m), county of Siegen-Wittgenstein, (NW)
- Die Höh (ca. 598 m), county of Siegen-Wittgenstein (NW)
- Die Burg (594.5 m), county of Siegen-Wittgenstein (NW)
- Hohenseelbachskopf (517.5 m), county of Siegen-Wittgenstein (NW), county of Altenkirchen (RP)
- Eisernhardt (482.3 m), borough of Siegen (NW)

=== North Sauerland Oberland ===
==== Arnsberg Forest ====
The Arnsberg Forest lies in the eponymous nature park entirely within North Rhine-Westphalia.

→ see also section: Hills in the article on Arnsberg Forest Nature Park

- Plackweghöhe (actually an unnamed peak; 581.5), county of Hochsauerlandkreis
- second highest hill: unnamed peak (559.5), county of Hochsauerlandkreis
- third highest hill: unnamed peak (557.4), county of Hochsauerlandkreis
- Warsteiner Kopf (556.9 m), county of Hochsauerlandkreis
- Gemeinheitskopf (551.9 m), county of Hochsauerlandkreis
- Niekopf (550.4 m), county of Soest

=== Bergisches Land on the Upper Agger and Wiehl ===
- Unnenberg (505.7 m), county of Oberbergischer Kreis

== Taunus ==
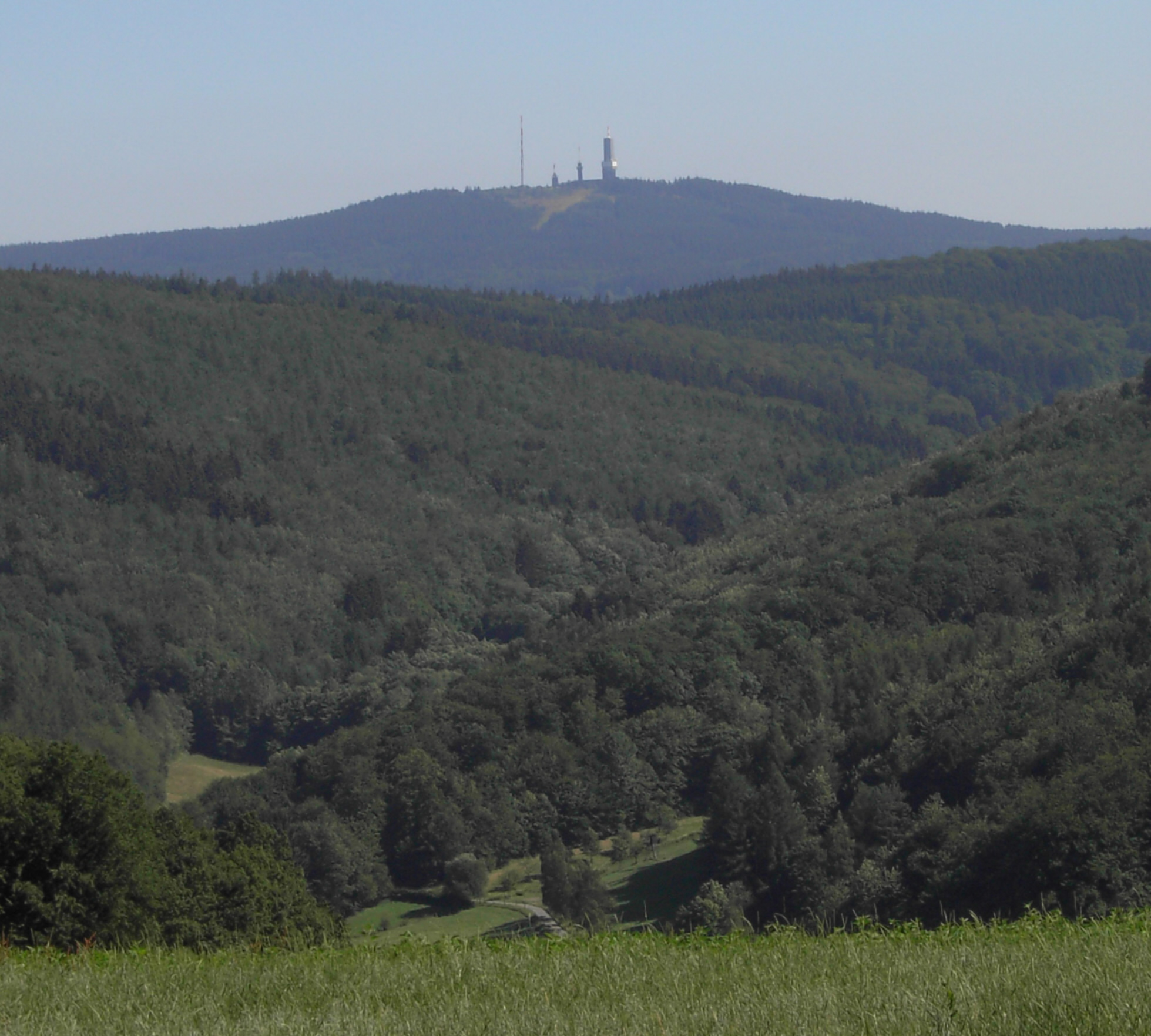
Großer Feldberg

The Taunus lies in Hesse with foothills in Rhineland-Palatinate.

→ main article: List of mountains and hills of the Taunus

- Großer Feldberg (881.5 m), county of Hochtaunuskreis
- Kleiner Feldberg (825.2 m), Hochtaunuskreis
- Altkönig (798.2 m), Hochtaunuskreis
- Weilsberg (700.7 m), Hochtaunuskreis
- Glaskopf (686.8 m), Hochtaunuskreis
- Pferdskopf (662.6 m), Hochtaunuskreis
- Kalte Herberge (619.3 m), Rheingau-Taunus-Kreis
- Hohe Wurzel (617.9 m), Rheingau-Taunus-Kreis
- Hohe Kanzel (591.8 m), Rheingau-Taunus-Kreis
- Herzberg (591.4 m), Hochtaunuskreis
- Hallgarter Zange (580.5 m), Rheingau-Taunus-Kreis
- Erbacher Kopf (579.8 m), Rheingau-Taunus-Kreis
- Wolfsküppel (545.1 m), Hochtaunuskreis
- Rassel (539.4 m), Wiesbaden
- Kuhbett (525.6 m), county of Limburg-Weilburg
- Steinkopf (518.0 m), Wetteraukreis
- Rossert (515.9 m), Main-Taunus-Kreis
- Atzelberg (506.7 m), Main-Taunus-Kreis
- Großer Lindenkopf (498.7 m), Rheingau-Taunus-Kreis
- Buchwaldskopf (ca. 492 m), Rheingau-Taunus-Kreis
- Goldgrube (492.0 m), Hochtaunuskreis
- Kellerskopf (474.0 m), Wiesbaden
- Suterkopf (461.8 m), county of Limburg-Weilburg
- Staufen (451.0 m), Main-Taunus-Kreis
- Hühnerküppel (369.3 m), county of Limburg-Weilburg

== Westerwald (natural region) ==
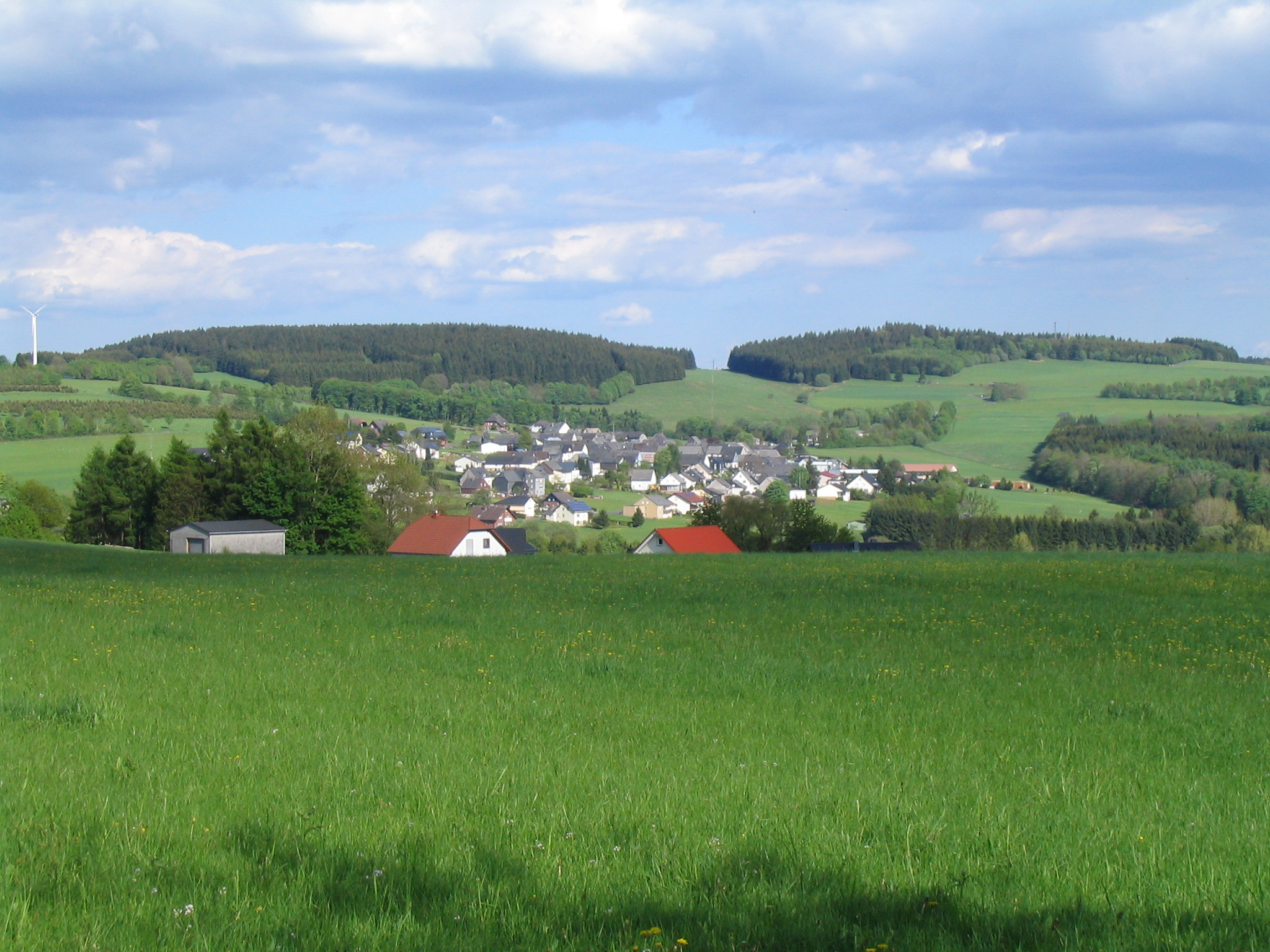
Fuchskaute

=== Westerwald ===
The Westerwald lies within Rhineland-Palatinate with foothills in North Rhine-Westphalia and Hesse.

→ main article: List of mountains and hills of the Westerwald

- Fuchskaute (657.3 m), Westerwaldkreis (RP)
- Stegskopf (654.4 m), county of Altenkirchen (RP)
- Salzburger Kopf (654.2 m), Westerwaldkreis (RP)
- Höllberg (642.8 m), Lahn-Dill-Kreis (HE)
- Auf der Baar (> 621.25 m), Lahn-Dill-Kreis (HE)
- Bartenstein (Barstein; ca. 614 m), Lahn-Dill-Kreis (HE)
- Knoten (605.4 m), Lahn-Dill-Kreis (HE)
- Alarmstange (545.2 m), Westerwaldkreis (RP)
- Köppel (540.2 m), Westerwaldkreis (RP)
- Hohenseelbachskopf (517.5 m), county of Siegen-Wittgenstein (NW), county of Altenkirchen (RP)
- Gräbersberg (513.1 m), Westerwaldkreis (RP)
- Mahlscheid (509.3 m), county of Siegen-Wittgenstein (NW) and county of Altenkirchen (RP)
- Helleberg (491.3 m), Westerwaldkreis (RP)
- Asberg (441.0 m), county of Neuwied (RP)
- Meerberg (Mehrberg; 430.5 m), county of Neuwied (RP)
- Malberg (422.0 m), Westerwaldkreis (RP)
- Minderberg (417.4 m), county of Neuwied (RP)
- Hummelsberg (411 m), county of Neuwied (RP)
- Heidenhäuschen (397.9 m), county of Limburg-Weilburg (HE)
- Hoher Schaden (388.3 m), Rhein-Sieg-Kreis (RP)
- Beulskopf (388.2 m), county of Altenkirchen (RP)
- Himmerich (366.4 m), Rhein-Sieg-Kreis (RP)
- Leyberg (358.8 m), Rhein-Sieg-Kreis (RP)
- Pfahlberg (Pfahlberg; 346.2 m), Westerwaldkreis (RP)

=== Gladenbach Uplands ===
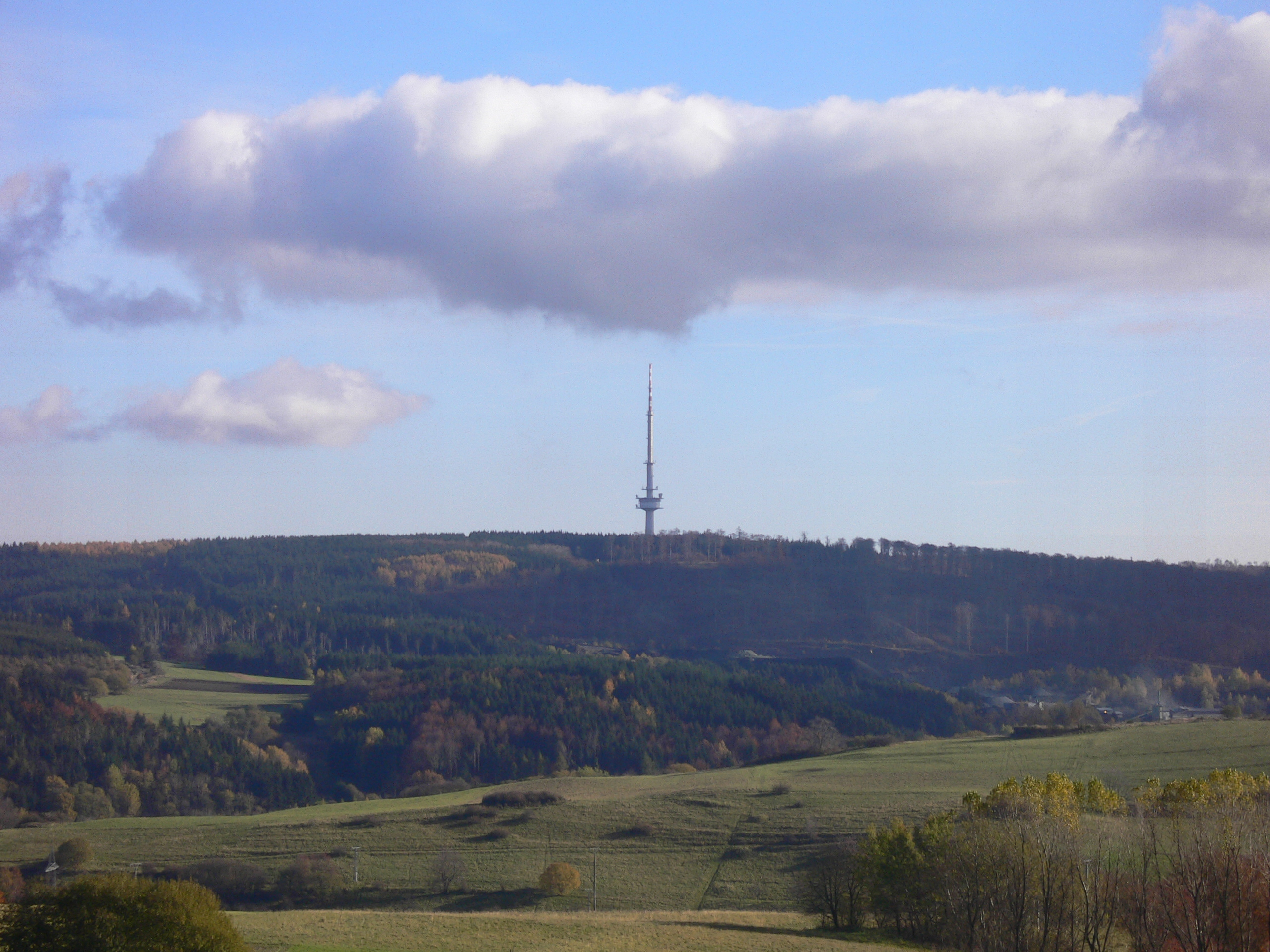
Angelburg and Angelburg Transmission Tower

The Gladenbach Upland lies entirely within Hesse.

→ see also section: Hills in the article on Gladenbach Uplands

- Angelburg (609.4 m), Lahn-Dill-Kreis
- Eschenburg (589.0 m), Lahn-Dill-Kreis
- Schwarzenberg (561.2 m), county of Marburg-Biedenkopf
- Daubhaus (551.8 m), county of Marburg-Biedenkopf
- Hünstein (503.7 m), county of Marburg-Biedenkopf
- Dünsberg (497.7 m), county of Gießen
- Hornberg (451.0 m), county of Marburg-Biedenkopf
- Altenberg (442.2 m), Lahn-Dill-Kreis
- Volpertsberg (426.4 m), Lahn-Dill-Kreis

=== Struth ===
- Hemmrain (561 m), Lahn-Dill-Kreis

== Abbreviations ==
The following abbreviations are used in the table:

German states (Bundesländer; ISO 3166-2):

- HE = Hesse
- NW = North Rhine-Westphalia
- RP = Rhineland-Palatinate
- SL = Saarland

Countries (based on their international vehicle registration codes):

- B = Belgium
- D = Germany (generally not used above)
- F = France (not used above as no mountains are listed yet)
- L = Luxembourg (not used above as no mountains are listed yet)
