= Burgholz (hill) =

Mountain in Germany

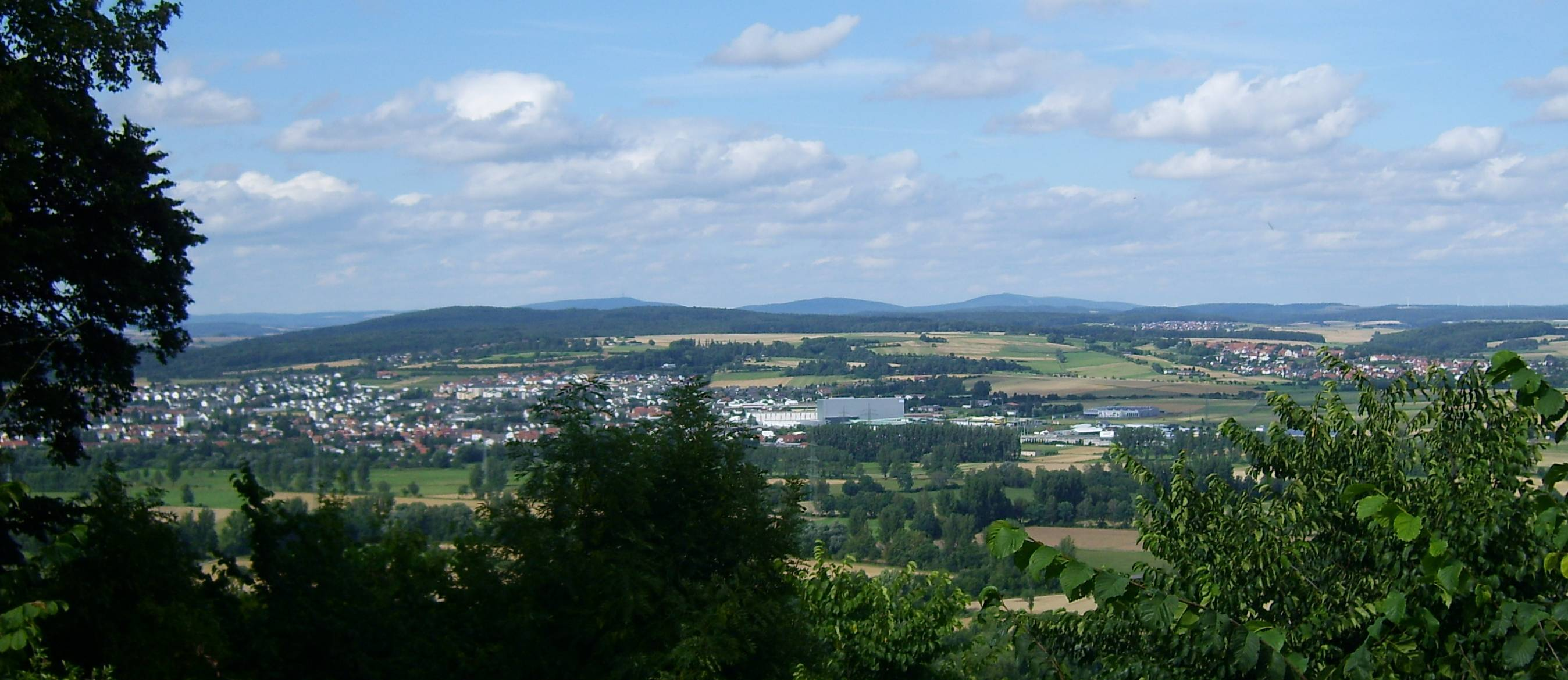
- View from Amöneburg towards the Gilserberg Heights with Burgholz on the left and the Kellerwald in the background, with Hohes Lohr on the left, with the TV tower, Jeust in the middle and Wüstegartenon the right. In the front left is the town of Kirchhain.

Highest point
- Elevation: 379.1 m (1,244 ft)
- Prominence: 10 m (33 ft)
- Coordinates: 50°52′18″N 8°56′48″E

Geography
- Location within Hesse
- Location: Hesse, Germany
- Parent range: Gilserberg Heights

Burgholz is a hill in the Gilserberg Heights near the town of Kirchhain in Marburg-Biedenkopf, which is 379 metres (1,243 ft) high. On the summit and the north-east slope is the district of Burgholz, which is part of the town of Kirchhain. The majority of the hill is covered by trees, with the exception of some housing on one slope.

== Geography ==
The Burgholz is the southwestern-most mountain of the Gilserberger Heights and merges directly into the Amöneburg Basin in the northern part of Kirchhain, while the Wohra valley joins it to the west, beyond which the southern Burgwald begins (separated from the northern part by the B3). On its outer flanks are Emsdorf (in the east), higher parts of Langenstein and Kirchhain (in the south), the town of Rauschenberg (already in and behind the valley of the Wohra, in the west), Ernsthausen (in the north of the valley) and Wolferode (also in the valley, in the northeast).

Despite its low height, the Burgholz is about 10 km taller than the Amöneburg, though to the north the elevations of the same ridge are much higher, due to being in the vicinity of the significantly higher Kellerwald.

== Peak ==
Since 1968, the top of the Burgholz has had the Hunburgturm, a 28.5 m high wooden observation tower, which provides a view of peaks in the Rothaar Mountains, including Kahlem Asten, Ziegenhelle, Bollerberg, and Sackpfeife. Peaks in the Gladenbach Uplands are also visible, including Dünsberg, Rimberg, Knüll, Kellerwald, and the Vogelsberg range. The tower is named after a castle that used to be near there, the Hunburg.

== Hunburg Castle ==
On the northwest spur of Burgholz, 6 km north of Kirchhain, are the ruins of Hunburg Castle, from roughly the 8th century. The ruins consist of fortifications with sections of trench and walls, a pincer gate in the southeast, and what is potentially a basement from a now-absent building.

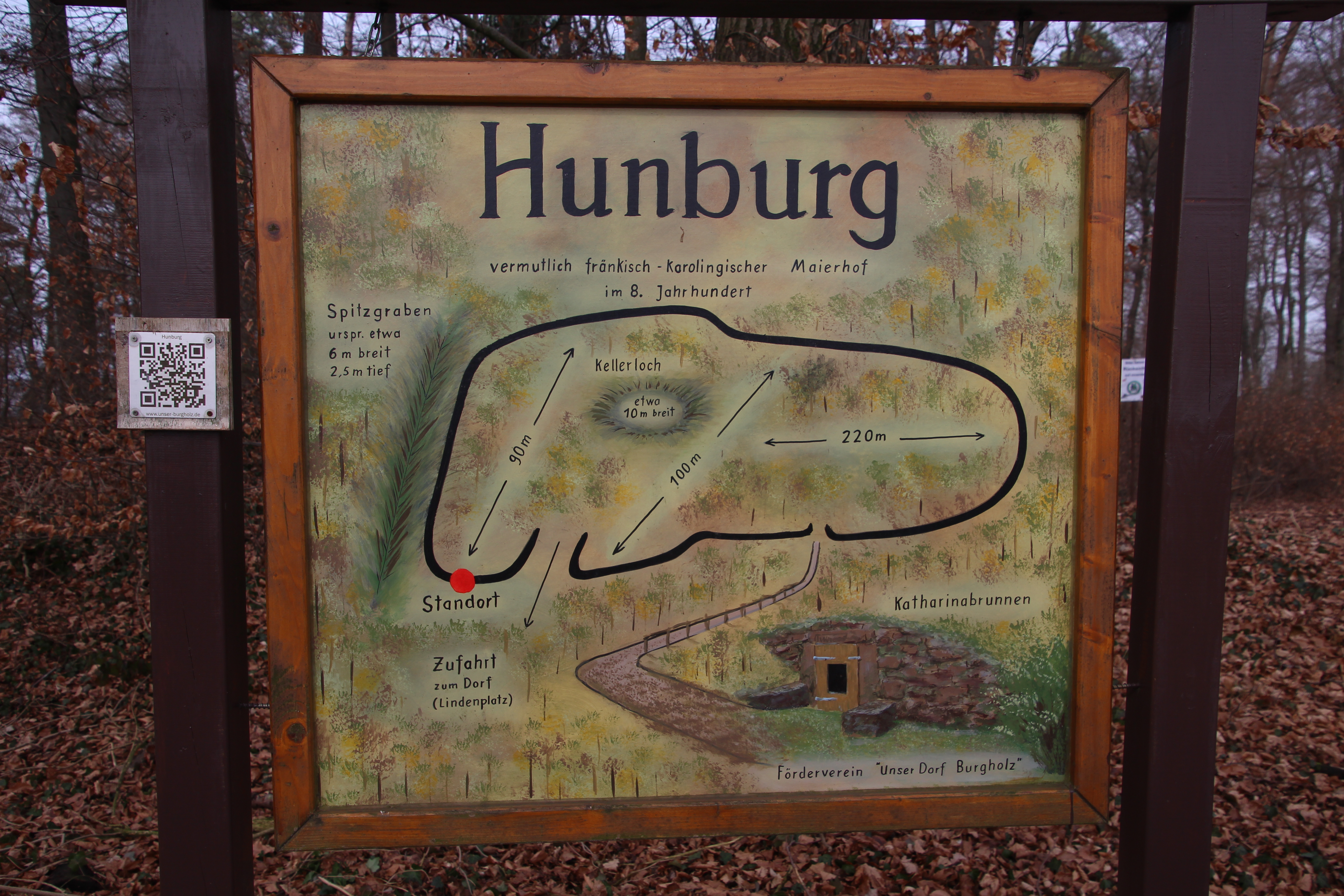
Informational map illustrating the remains of Hunburg Castle.
