= Upper Hessian Ridge =

Hill chain in Germany

The Upper Hessian Ridge (German: Oberhessische Schwelle) or Upper Hesse Ridge is a hill chain in the West Hesse Highlands in North and Middle Hesse, which lies on the Rhine-Weser watershed and links the montane Central Upland ranges of the Kellerwald and the Vogelsberg in a north-south direction. The swell is divided into the Gilserberg Heights (Gilserberger Höhen) in the north, the central Neustadt Saddle (Neustädter Sattel) and the Northern Vogelsberg Foreland (Nördliche Vogelsberg-Vorland) in the south.

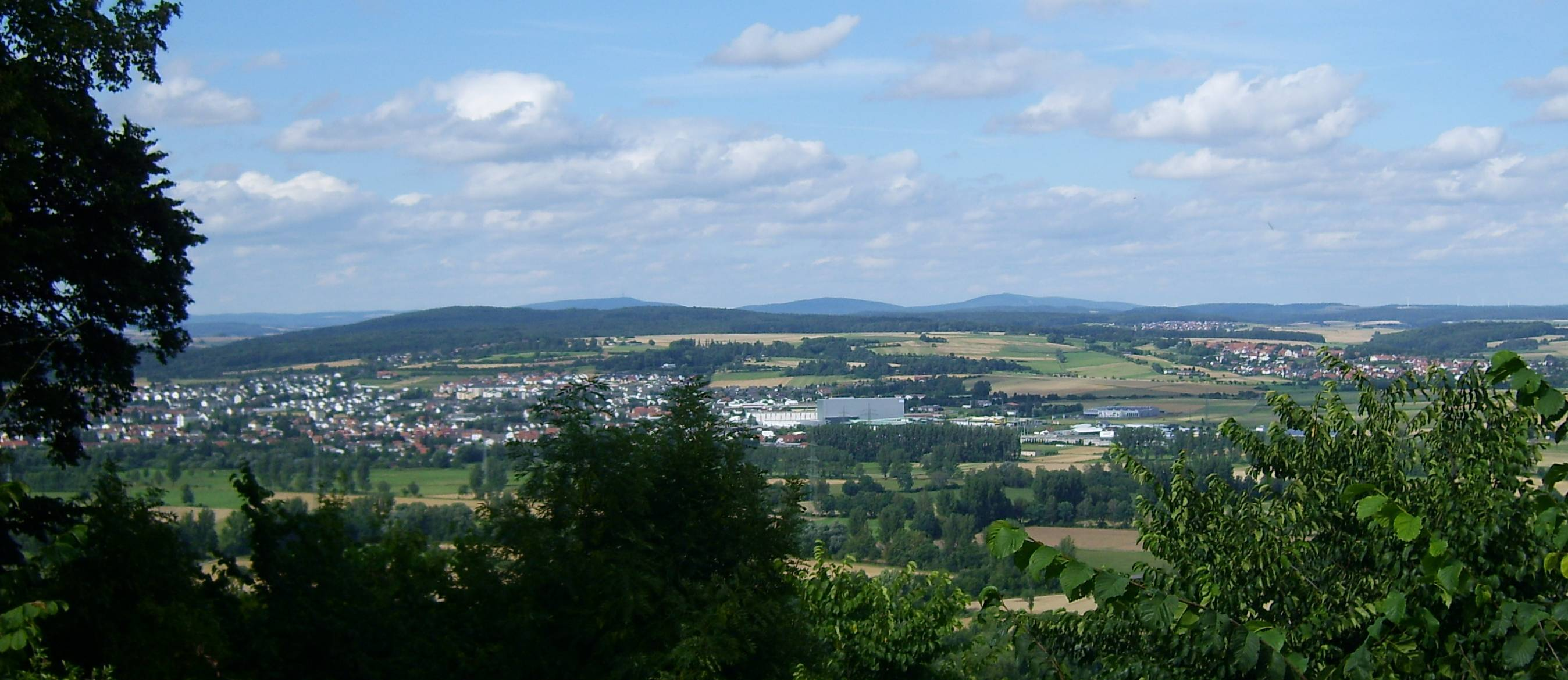
View from the Amöneburg of the Gilserberg Heights with the Burgholz (379.1 m, left) and, on the Kellerwald behind, the Hohes Lohr (656.7 m, left, TV tower), Jeust (ca. 585 m, centre) and Wüstegarten (675.3 m, right). Front left :the town of Kirchhain.

== Location ==
In the north the Gilserberg Heights transition directly into the clearly much higher Kellerwald with its prominent hills, the Jeust and the Wüstegarten; to the northeast into the Löwenstein Bottom, which is part of the Ostwaldecker Randsenken.

Separated by the Wohra the ridge is adjoined in the northwest by the Burgwald at the Gilserberg Heights. In the southwest the Ohm and the flat Amöneburg Basin follows by the Neustadt Saddle and the Northern Vogelsberg Foreland.

The Vogelsberg Foreland goes in the extreme southwest – again with the Ohm as its boundary – into the Lumda Plateau. The Lumda Plateau is part of the so-called Anterior Vogelsberg (Vorderen Vogelsberg), which adjoins east of the Ohm valley in the south the Lower Vogelsberg (Untere Vogelsberg). Like the actual (High) Vogelsberg it belongs to the East Hesse Highlands (Osthessischen Bergland).

To the east of the three parts of the Upper Hessian Ridge is the West Hesse Depression (Westhessische Senke) in the shape of the Schwalm by the Eder tributary of the same name.

== Natural region division ==
The Upper Hessian Ridge is part of the West Hesse Highlands (major unit group 34) and is subdivided as follows:

- 346 Upper Hessian Ridge
  - 346.0 Gilserberg Heights (164.97 km²)
  - 346.1 Neustadt Saddle (84.49 km²)
  - 346.2 Northern Vogelsberg Foreland (199.16 km²)

=== Gilserberg Heights ===
The Gilserberg Heights are mostly forested; large parts of the northern area belong to the Treysa State Forest, its southwestern spur near Burgholz to the Rauschenberg State Forest and the Kirchhain Municipal Forest.

Whilst in the north, in the immediate neighbourhood zum noch gut 200 m höheren Kellerwald, noch Höhen von bis zu 470.6 m (Hundskopf) erreicht, flacht der Höhenzug nach Süden auf die maximale Gipfelhöhe von 379.1 m (Burgholz) ab.

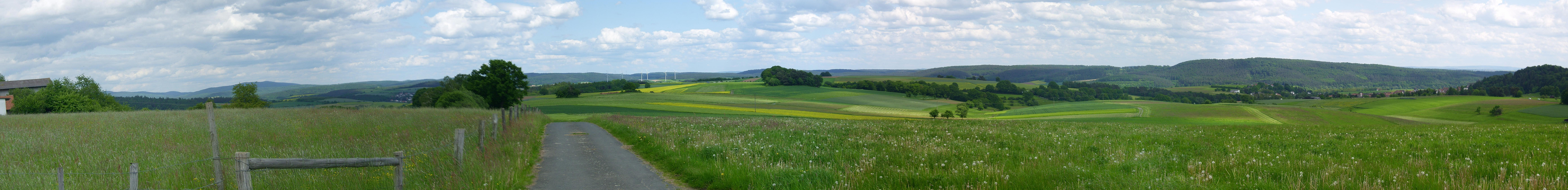
View from the Wolfskaute near Rauschenberg of the Gilserberg Heights, part of the Upper Hessian Ridge, which links the Vogelsberg (773.0 m, rear; far right) with the Kellerwald (up to 675.3 m, far left). Right: the Burgholz (379.1 m); centre right in the far distance is the Kirschenwald (up to 532.8 m) in the Knüll (up to 635.5 m); centre left is the Ernsthausen wind farm; far left and optically merged into one another are the Jeust (ca. 585 m) and the Wüstegarten (675.3 m); on the extreme left is the Hohes Lohr (656.7 m, TV transmitter)

=== Neustadt Saddle ===
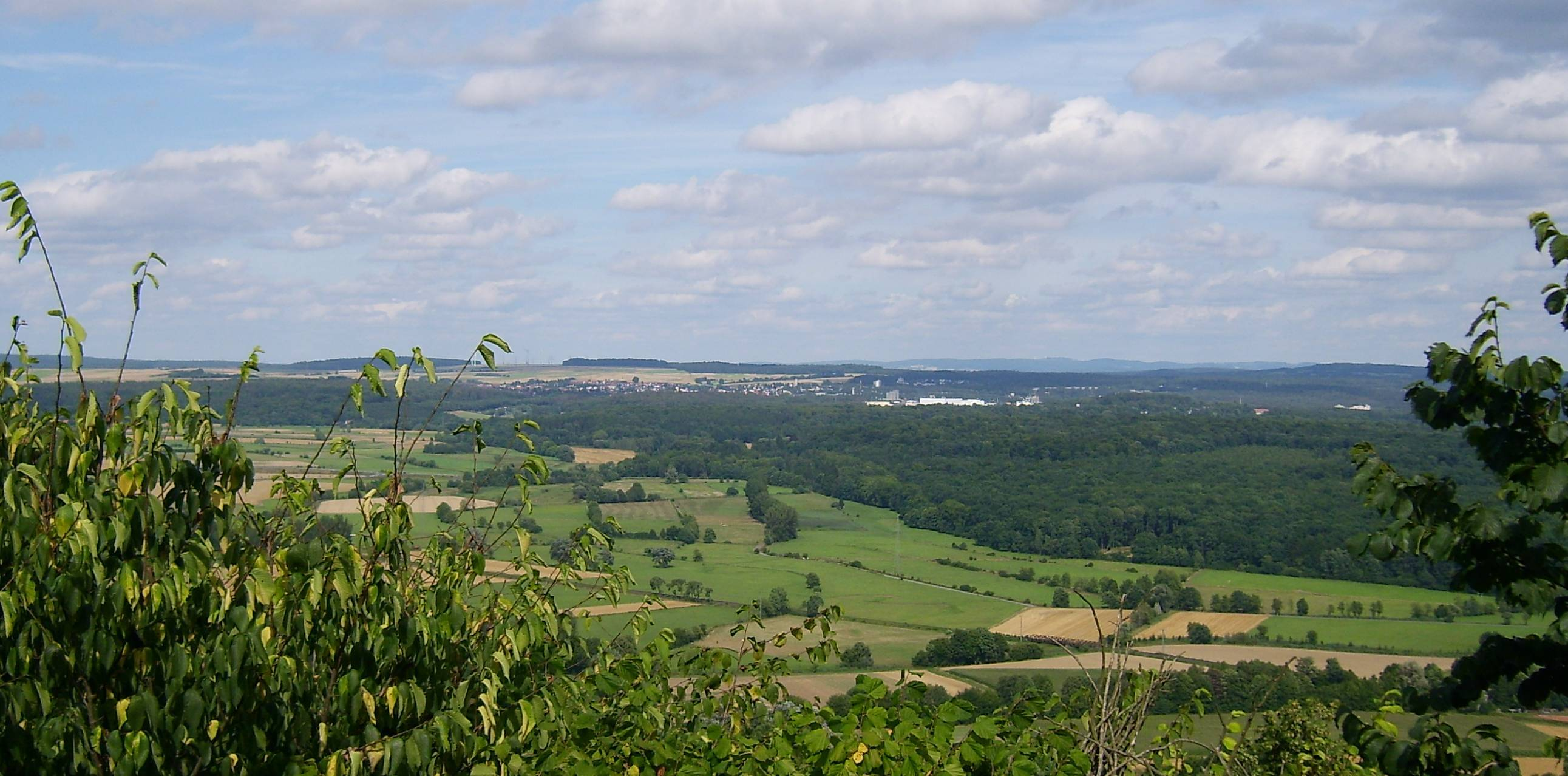
View from the Amöneburg of the Neustadt Saddle and Knüll (635.5 m). Immediately left of the saddle of the largely cleared Krückeberg (345.4 m), which from a natural regional perspective counts as part of the saddle; right of the saddle is the plateau of the Northern Vogelsberg Foreland (388 m)

The (from a natural region perspective) very narrow, north-south oriented Neustadt Saddle is the lowest part of the Rhine-Weser watershed between the Kellerwald and the Vogelsberg. The Main-Weser Railway crosses it between Stadtallendorf and Neustadt at a height of about 285 m above sea level (NN), the B 454 federal highway also crosses it at just under 300 m above NN.

Whilst the Neustadt Saddle forms the actual low point on the ridge between the plateau of the Krückeberg (at the southern end of the Gilserberg Heights) to the north and the Wahlen Plateau (Wahlener Hochplateau, at the northern end of the Northern Vogelsberg Foreland) to the southeast, the Neustadt Saddle natural region also includes the Krückeberg, but not the Wahlen Plateau.

==== Mediterranean-Mjøsa Zone ====
The Neustadt Saddle is part of the Mediterranean-Mjøsa Zone, a sequence of valleys that runs from the Rhone valley along the Upper Rhine Graben, the Wetterau and the Gießen Basin, below the Anterior Vogelsberg to the Amöneburg Basin; from there via the Neustadt Saddle in the West Hesse Depression and on along the Leine Graben to the Oslo Graben.

=== Northern Vogelsberg Foreland ===
The north of the Northern Vogelsberg Foreland is, in the immediate vicinity of the Neustadt Saddle, dominated by an entirely cleared plateau up to 388 metres high, around the villages of Wahlen, Arnshain und Gleimenhain in the borough of Kirtorf. Here there are various wind farms, the views extend in good weather as far as e.g. the Hoher Meißner, 70 kilometres away to the northeast, and is unbroken in almost all directions of the compass.

In the northwest lies the forest of Herrenwald which barely reaches 300 m above NN in height, near Stadtallendorf, the south is also largely wooded.

In the southwest flows the Gleen, which in the south is part of the boundary stream of the Lower Vogelsberg.

== Hills (selection) ==
- Hundskopf (470.6 m) − extreme north of the Gilserberg Heights
- Dachsberg (388 m) − highest point on the cleared plateau in the north of the Northern Vogelsberg Foreland on the Rhine-Weser watershed, immediately south of the Neustadt Saddle near Arnshain
- Burgholz (379.1 m) − extreme southwest of the Gilserberg Heights; observation tower
- Kohlkopf (371.4 m) − in the west of the Treysa State Forest, Gilserberg Height
- Hochberg (359.4 m) − local hill of Homberg (Ohm) which, thanks to clearance, has a good view of the southwest boundary of the Northern Vogelsberg Foreland with the Lumda Plateau
- Krückeberg (345.4 m) − cleared plateau in the north of the Neustadt Saddle, which is immediately next to the southern end of the Gilserberg Heights and is linked by the actual saddle to the southeastern Wahlen Plateau
- Nellenberg (344.6 m) − kuppe-like local hill of Neustadt with castle ruins on the southern end of the Neustadt Saddle

== Places ==
The Gilserberg Heights lie within the counties of Schwalm-Eder-Kreis and Marburg-Biedenkopf, the Neustadt Saddle mainly within Marburg-Biedenkopf and the Northern Vogelsberg Foreland mainly in the Vogelsbergkreis (except for the far northwest where it is part of Marburg-Biedenkopf).

Important settlements are Gilserberg in the north, Jesberg on the northeastern edge, Schwalmstadt on the eastern side, Kirchhain on the western boundary, Stadtallendorf and Neustadt in the centre and Homberg (Ohm) and Kirtorf on the southern boundary.
