= European Cenozoic Rift System =

Geological rifts by the Alps

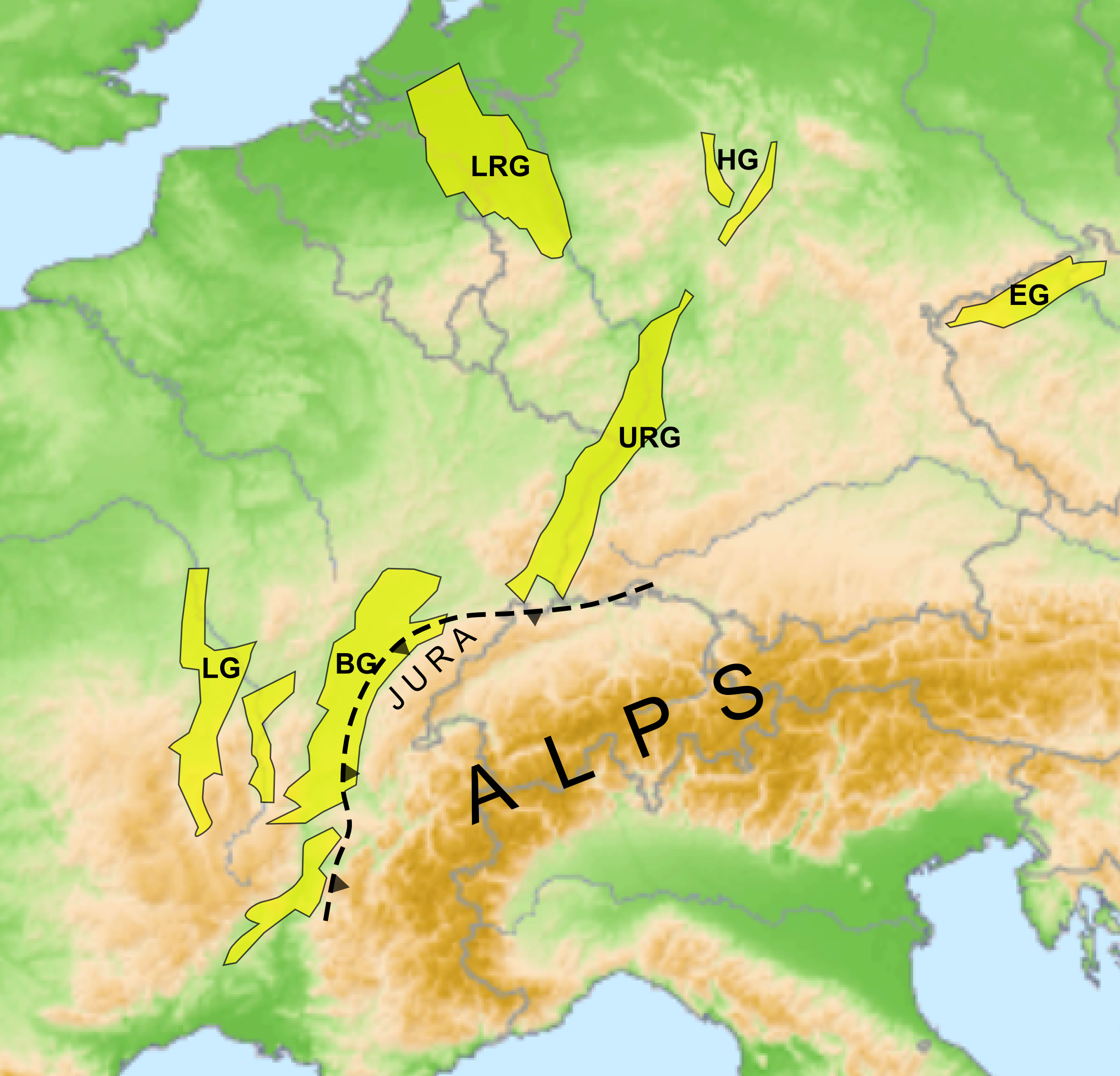
Topographic map with location of ECRIS rift basins: LG=Limagne Graben, BG=Bresse Graben, URG=Upper Rhine Graben, LRG=Lower Rhine Graben, HG=Hessian Grabens & EG=Eger Graben, and Jura mountains with frontal thin-skinned thrust shown

The European Cenozoic Rift System (ECRIS) is a 1,100 km (680 mi) long system of rifts formed in the foreland of the Alps as the lithosphere responded to the effects of the Alpine and Pyrenean orogenies. The system began to form during the Late Eocene and parts (particularly the Upper and Lower Rhine Grabens) remain seismically active today and are responsible for most of the larger earthquakes in Europe, north of the Alps.

== Extent ==
The ECRIS consists of a series of rifts and associated transfer faults extending from the Mediterranean to the North Sea.

=== Limagne Graben ===
This north-south trending rift structure formed in the middle Eocene creating a lake that is now the Limagne plain. The main phase of subsidence continued until the Late Oligocene. The graben is controlled by faults on its western side and is filled with Cenozoic sediments up to 2 km thick.

=== Bresse Graben ===
The Bresse Graben lies to the east of the Limagne Graben. Rifting started during the Eocene, pausing from the Late Oligocene to Middle Miocene before resuming in the Late Miocene. The eastern margin of the basin was overridden by thrust faults from the Jura Mountains, the leading edge of the Alpine thin-skinned deformation.

=== Upper Rhine Graben ===
The Upper Rhine Graben extends from the northern edge of the Jura mountains in the south up to the triple junction where the ECRIS branches. Rifting initiated here in the Oligocene but the northern and southern parts of the graben show distinct post-Oligocene histories. In the Miocene the southern part of the graben became uplifted, while the northern part continued to subside into the Pleistocene. Currently the Upper Rhine Graben is thought to be experiencing dextral strike-slip reactivation.

=== Lower Rhine Graben ===
The Lower Rhine Graben or Lower Rhine Embayment, trends NW-SE and continues offshore into structures within the southern North Sea. To the southeast the dominant faults are SW-dipping, while to the northwest they become NE-dipping, in both cases giving it a half-graben geometry. Rifting initiated during the Oligocene and continues to the present day.

=== Hessian Grabens ===
The Hessian grabens lie north of the Upper Rhine Graben and follow the same trend. There are two main rift structures, the Wetterau and Leine grabens. They were active during the Oligocene but are inactive now.

=== Eger Graben ===
The easternmost part of the system, the Eger Graben shows two distinct phases of extension at the end of the Eocene and during the early Miocene. The first phase was oblique to the rift axis and led to the formation of en-echelon W-E trending fault sets. The second was orthogonal to the rift axis, leading to overprinting of the early W-E faults by later SW-NE trending faults.

== Origin ==
The rift system is thought to have formed in response to compression of the lithosphere in front of the zones of collision that formed the Alps and Pyrenees. The initial rift propagated northwards as the collision along the Alps intensified and the western part of France moved to the west.

== Volcanism ==
The development of the ECRIS was accompanied (and in some cases preceded) by volcanic activity over large parts of the rift system that persisted into the Quaternary. The largest volcanic centres were located to the southwest of the Limagne and Bresse Grabens, the Massif Central, at the rift triple junction at the northern end of the Upper Rhine Graben, the Vogelsberg Mountains and around the Eger Graben. The last recorded volcanic activity was a phreatomagmatic eruption in the Chaîne des Puys about 6,000 years ago.

== Seismicity ==
Most seismic activity within the ECRIS is confined to the Upper and Lower Rhine Grabens. The 1356 Basel earthquake, which had an epicenter within the Upper Rhine Graben is the most damaging historical seismic event known from central Europe.

== Mediterranean-Mjosa Zone ==
The term Mediterranean-Mjosa Zone (Mittelmeer-Mjösen-Zone) was coined by the German geologist Hans Stille in about 1930 to describe a rift in the continental Crust crossing Europe from the Mediterranean Sea via Marseille, the Rhine rift as far as Mjøsa in the south of Norway, a total length of 2000 km.

The rift is composed of the following sections: Valley of Rhône in France and its northern continuation the Bresse Rift, the Rhine Rift Valley and the Mainz Basin. Here the rift system splits up into a north-eastern and a north-western branch. Part of the north-western branch is the Lower Rhine Bay and the Lower Rhine Rift as a central Netherlands rift system. The north-eastern branch continues with the Wetterau, the Giessen Basin, the Amöneburg Basin, the Upper Hessian Ridge near Neustadt, the West Hesse Depression, the Leine Rift, part of the Salt dome region in northern Germany, the Kattegat, the Oslo Rift and eventually Mjøsa with Lillehammer at its northern end.

In the area surrounding the Mediterranean-Mjosa Zone there was some volcanism, e.g. Kaiserstuhl or Hoher Habichtswald west of Kassel, which primarily consist of basalt.
