= Suterkopf =

Mountain in Hesse, Germany

Coordinates: 50°21′N 8°20′E

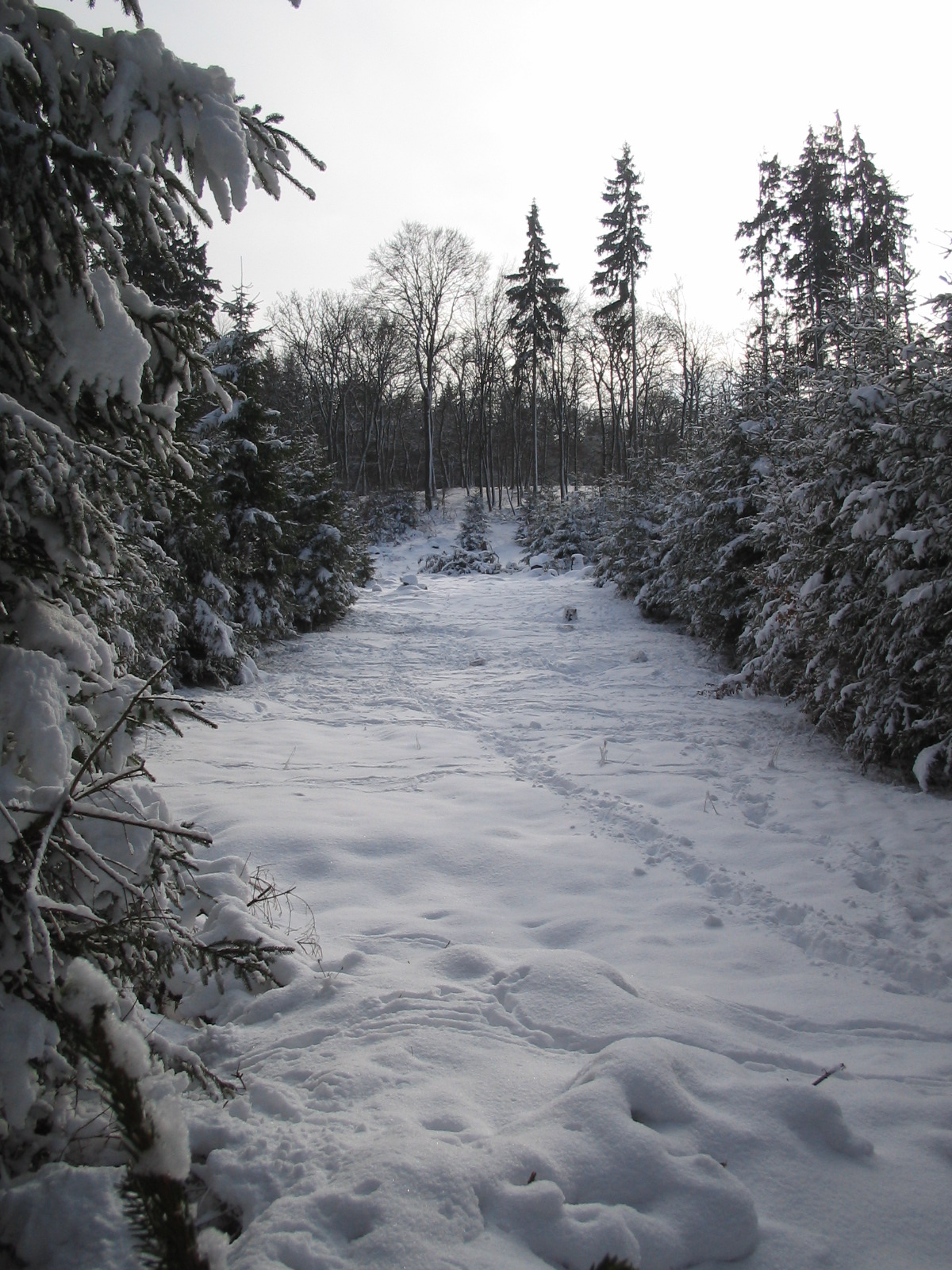
- Partial view from the north of the Suterkopf plateau.

Highest point
- Elevation: 461.8 m (1,515 ft)

Geography
- Location: Hesse, Germany

Suterkopf is a mountain of Hesse, Germany.

The Suterkopf is a 461.8 meter (1,515 ft) high hill located near the village of Haintchen in the Taunus mountain range of Hesse, Germany. It lies within the Limburg-Weilburg district. During World War II, there was an observation tower built on top of the Suterkopf that had a telephone line running down to Haintchen village, likely used for military surveillance purposes. The Suterkopf is part of the central Taunus range, a heavily forested low mountain region that stretches across parts of Hesse, Rhineland-Palatinate and North Rhine-Westphalia. While not a particularly high peak, the Suterkopf's elevated position makes it a prominent local landmark within the rolling hills of the Taunus.
