= Kuhbett =

Mountain

Coordinates: 50°19′43″N 8°19′39″E

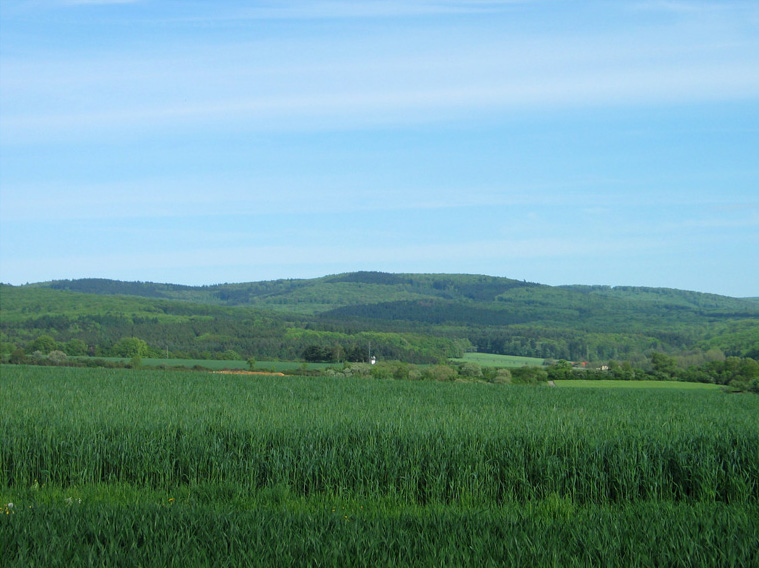
- View of Kuhbett

Highest point
- Elevation: 526 m (1,726 ft)

Geography
- Location: Hesse, Germany

Kuhbett is a hill of Hesse, Germany.
