= Rimberg (Knüll) =

Mountain in Germany

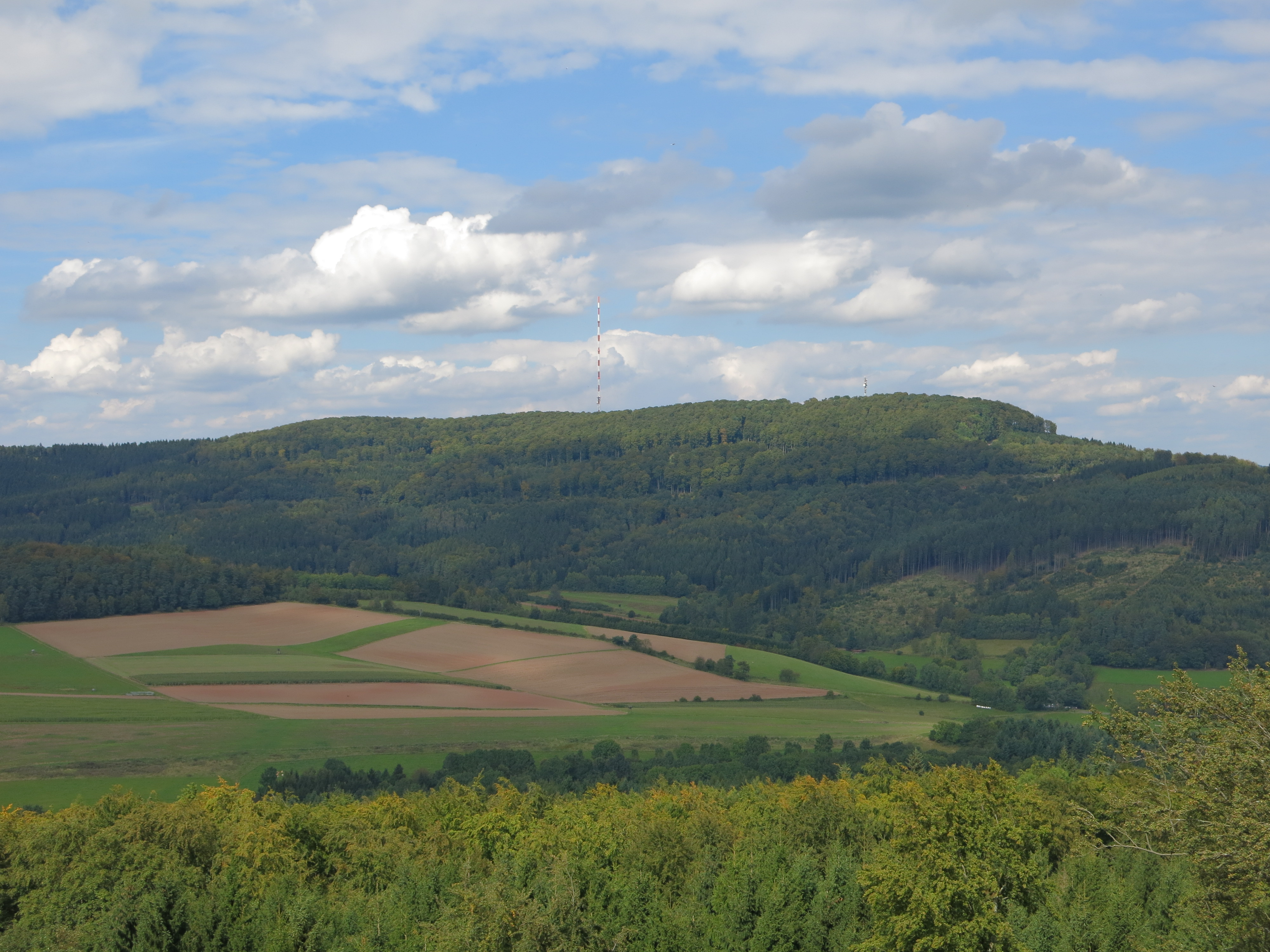
- Rimberg from the south, taken from Herzberg Castle.

Highest point
- Elevation: 591.8 m (1,942 ft)NHN
- Coordinates: 50°47′35″N 9°28′1″E

Geography
- Location: Hesse, Germany
- Parent range: Knüll Mountains

The Rimberg in the Knüll Mountains (Knüll) is 1,942 ft above sea level. A massive mountain near in the Hersfeld-Rotenburg district in northern Hesse Germany.

== Geography ==
=== Location ===
The Rimberg lies in the southern foothills of the Knüllgebirge in the southwest part of the Hersfeld-Rotenburg district between the towns of Alsfeld in the west-southwest and Bad Hersfeld in the east-northeast. Its summit rises around 9 km southwest of Kirchheim, about 4 km northwest of Breitenbach am Herzberg, 1.6 km north-northwest of Gehau, 3.4 km southeast of Görzhain and 1.8 km southwest of Machtlos.

The eastern extension of the Rimberg is the Große Bartküppel (518.5 m) with the Kleiner Bartküppel (approx. 398 m) to the southeast of it, its southern extension the Hopfenstein (505.1 m) and its western extension the Frohnkreuzkopf (approx. 530 m).

The Aula tributary Ibra rises north of the Rimberg, the Ibra tributary Machtloser Wasser rises to the northeast, the Jossa tributary Breitenbach flows south past the Rimberg in a west-east direction and the Grenff rises northwest of the mountain.

Parts of the Knüll bird sanctuary (VSG no. 5022-401; 269.5731 km^{2}) extend to the southwestern, western and northwestern mountain slopes.

The Rimberg is part of the East Hessian Buntsandstein floe.

== Transmitters ==
The Rimberg transmitter (approx. 570 m) has been located on the northwest part of the Rimberg since 1957, broadcasting analogue radio (UKW), digital radio (DAB+) and digital television (DVB-T).

There is also a transmission mast on the Großer Bartküppel about 170 m east of the Motel-Rasthaus Rimberg, on the other side of the federal highway 5.

== Transport and Tourism ==
The high altitudes of the Rimberg are crossed by the quite curvy Hattenbacher triangle – Alsfeld –Ost section of the federal highway 5, the gradients of which are particularly difficult for trucks. The Motel- Rasthaus Rimberg (484 m), which was built around 500 m east of the mountain peak or directly west of the A 5, is accessible by car from both directions – coming directly from the north and from the south on a bridge leading over the motorway to reach.

The Rimberg is forested with beech and spruce trees. Its summit can be climbed during a walk, starting at the rest house, among other places. From the top you can enjoy the view – for example towards the north to Hoch Knüll.

=== Natural spatial assignment ===
The Rimberg belongs to the main natural unit group East Hessian Mountains (No. 35) in the main unit Fulda-Haune-Tafelland (355) to the Ottrauer Bergland natural area (355.0).
