= Bartenstein (mountain) =

Mountain in Hesse, Germany

Coordinates: 50°40′03″N 8°09′55″E

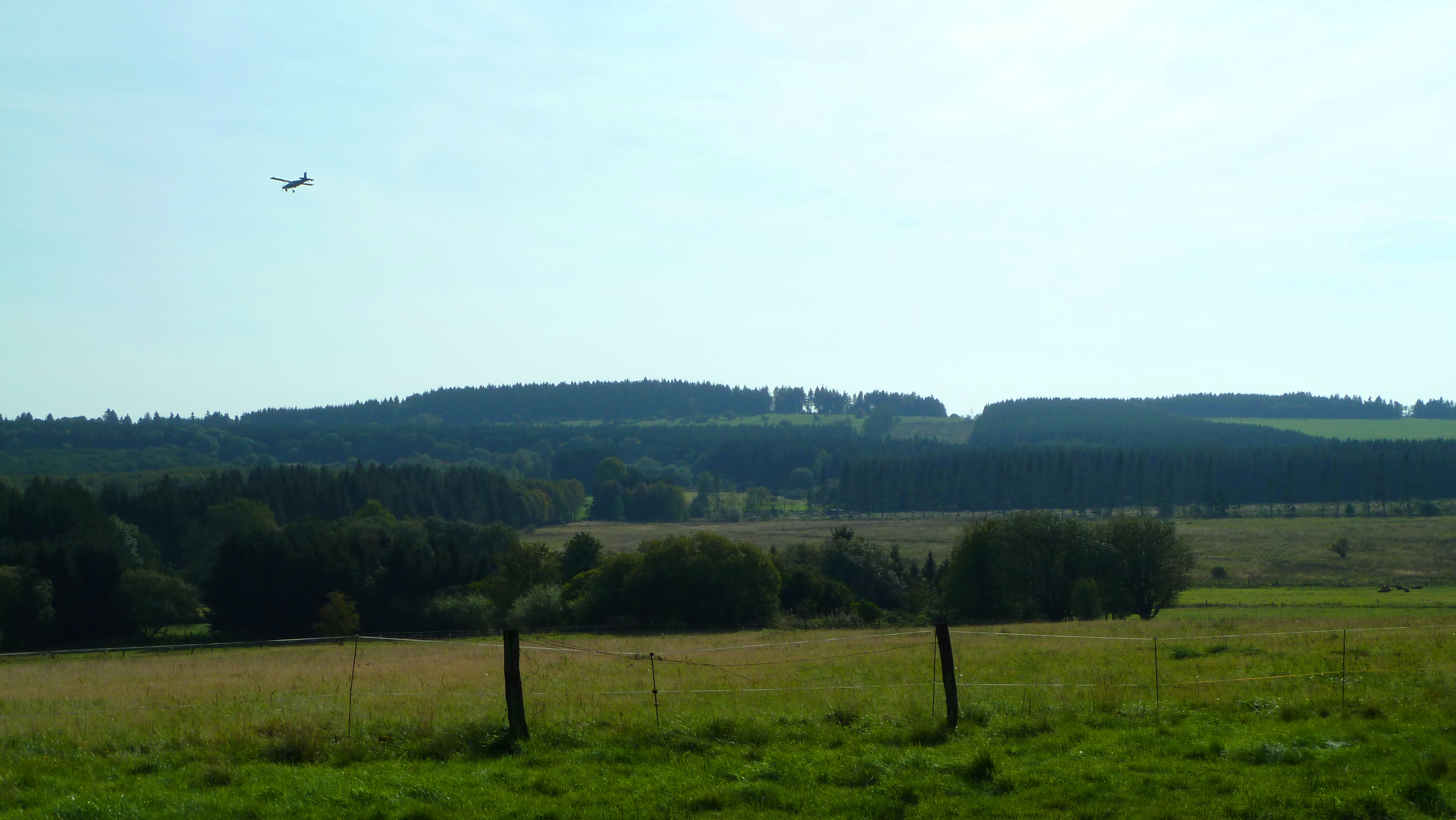
- Bartenstein mountain.

Highest point
- Elevation: 614 m (2,014 ft)

Geography
- Location: Hesse, Germany

Bartenstein is a mountain of Hesse, Germany. It is a 750 m high mountain in the Westerwald region, with a basalt summit of 617.6 m. The basalt peak is designated as a geological attraction of the Westerwald-Lan-Thon geopark. The name Bartenstein appears on the new map; however it is also known as Barstein, especially locally.
