= Auf der Baar =

Mountain in Hesse, Germany

Coordinates: 50°40′N 8°09′E

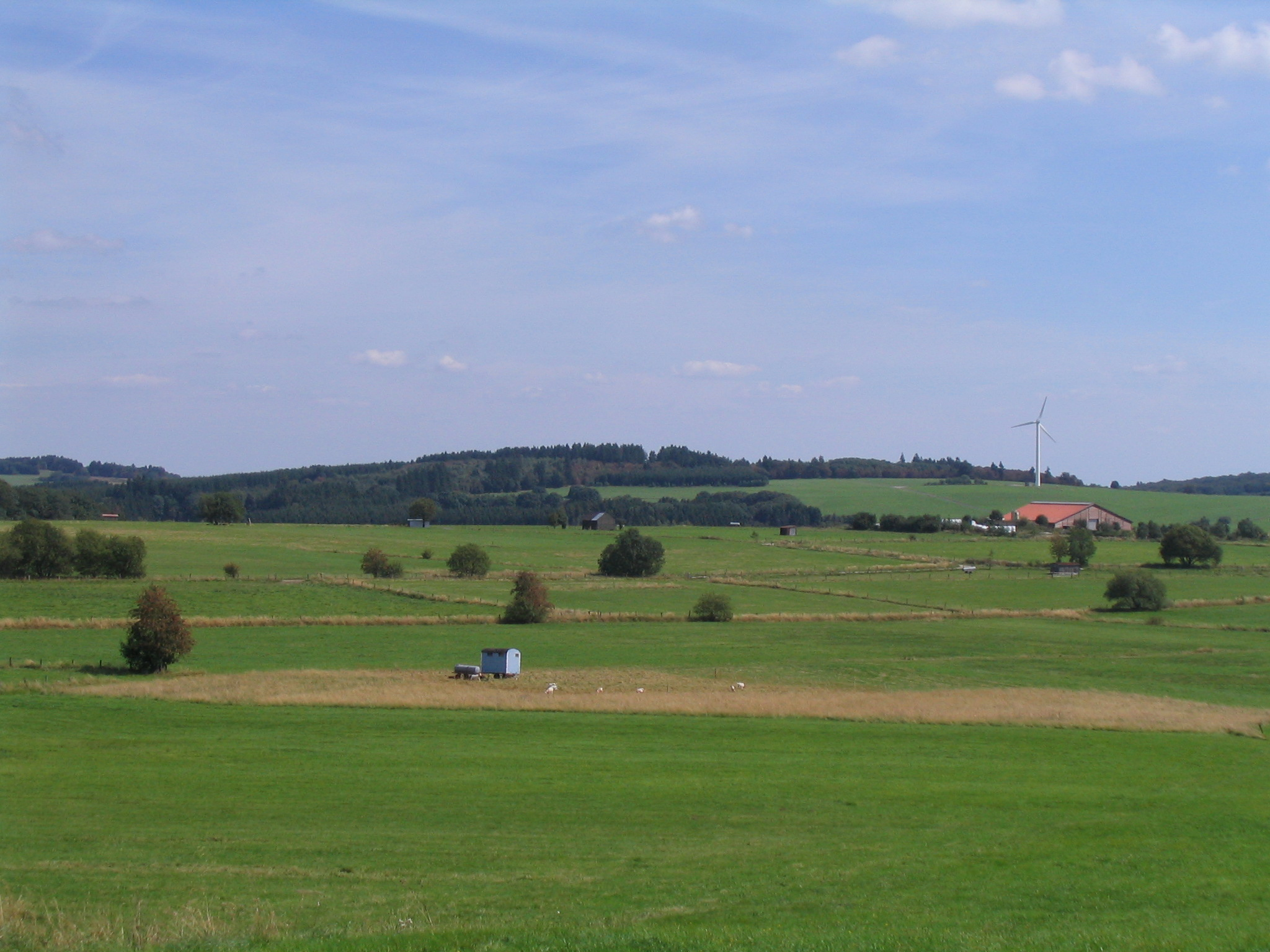

Highest point
- Elevation: 615 m (2,018 ft)

Geography
- Location: Hesse, Germany

Auf der Baar is a mountain of Hesse, Germany.
