= Volpertsberg =

Mountain in Germany

Coordinates: 50°43′N 8°20′E

Highest point
- Elevation: 426 m (1,398 ft)

Geography
- Location: Hesse, Germany

Volpertsberg is a mountain of Hesse, Germany.
