= Knoten (hill) =

Hill in Hesse, Germany

Coordinates: 50°35′47″N 8°09′40″E

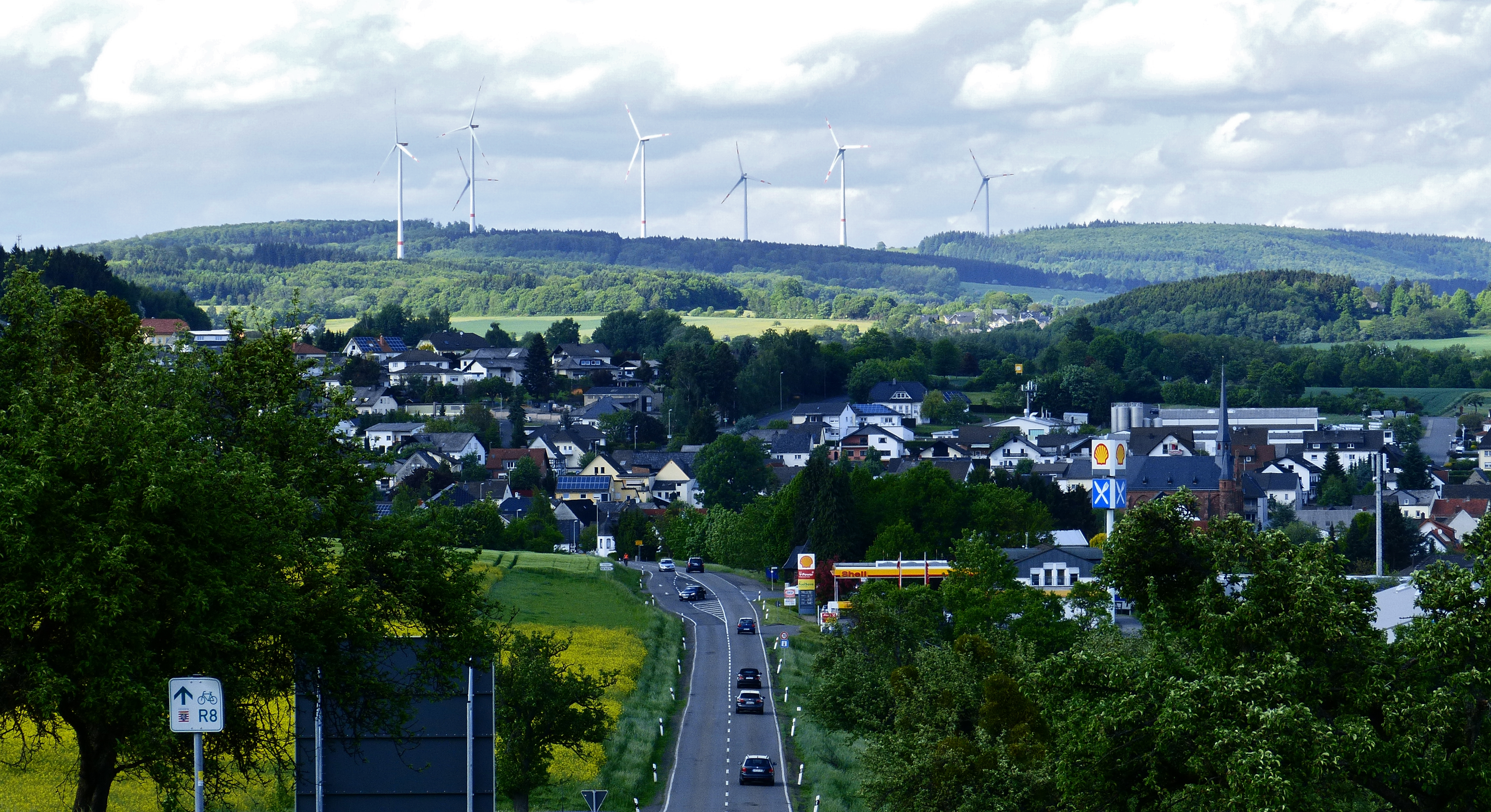

Highest point
- Elevation: 605 m (1,985 ft)

Geography
- Location: Hesse, Germany

Knoten is a high hill in Hesse, Germany.
