= Hohe Kanzel =

Coordinates: 50°10′N 8°16′E

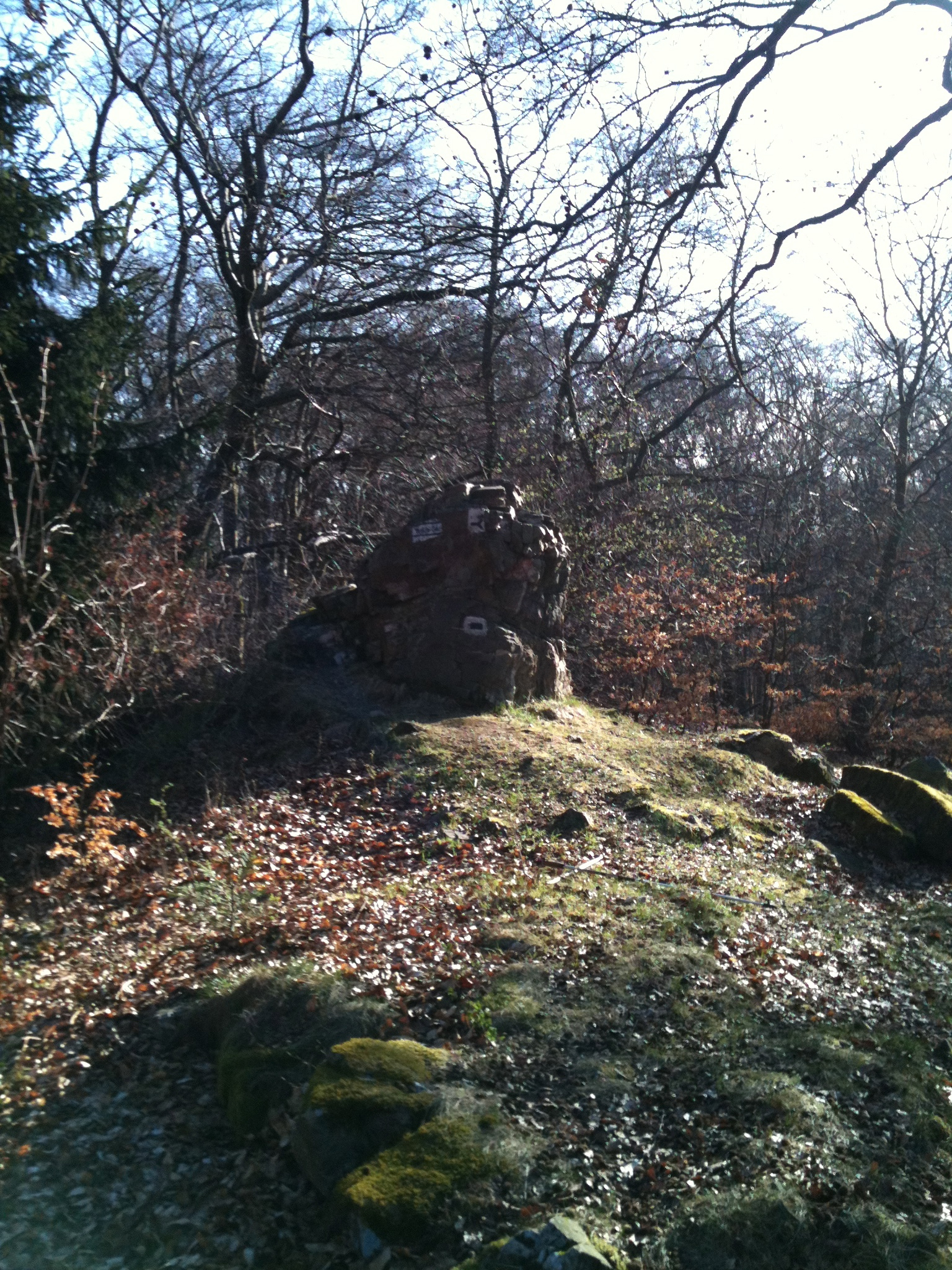
- Hohe Kanzel summit stone

Highest point
- Elevation: 592 m (1,942 ft)

Geography
- Location: Hesse, Germany

Hohe Kanzel is a hill of Hesse, Germany.
