= Wolfsküppel =

Mountain in Hesse, Germany

Coordinates: 50°18′N 8°25′E

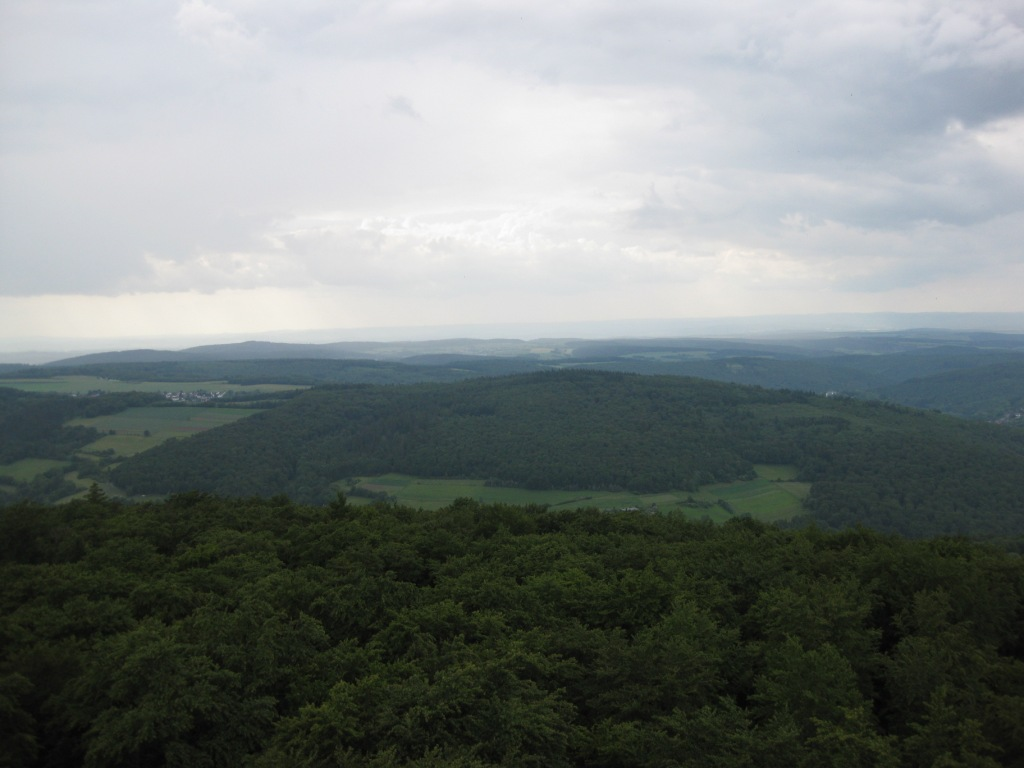
- View from the observation tower to the Wolsküppel (center) in the Eastern Hintertaunus - with the village of Riedelbach (left).

Highest point
- Elevation: 545 m (1,788 ft)

Geography
- Location: Hesse, Germany

Wolfsküppel is a mountain of Hesse, Germany.
