= Schwarzenberg (Breidenbacher Grund) =

Mountain in Germany

Coordinates: 50°53′16″N 8°29′35″E

Highest point
- Elevation: 561 m (1,841 ft)

Geography
- Location: Hesse, Germany

Schwarzenberg is a mountain of Hesse, Germany.
