= Uhrenkopf =

Mountain in Germany

Coordinates: 51.1854°N 9.0657°E

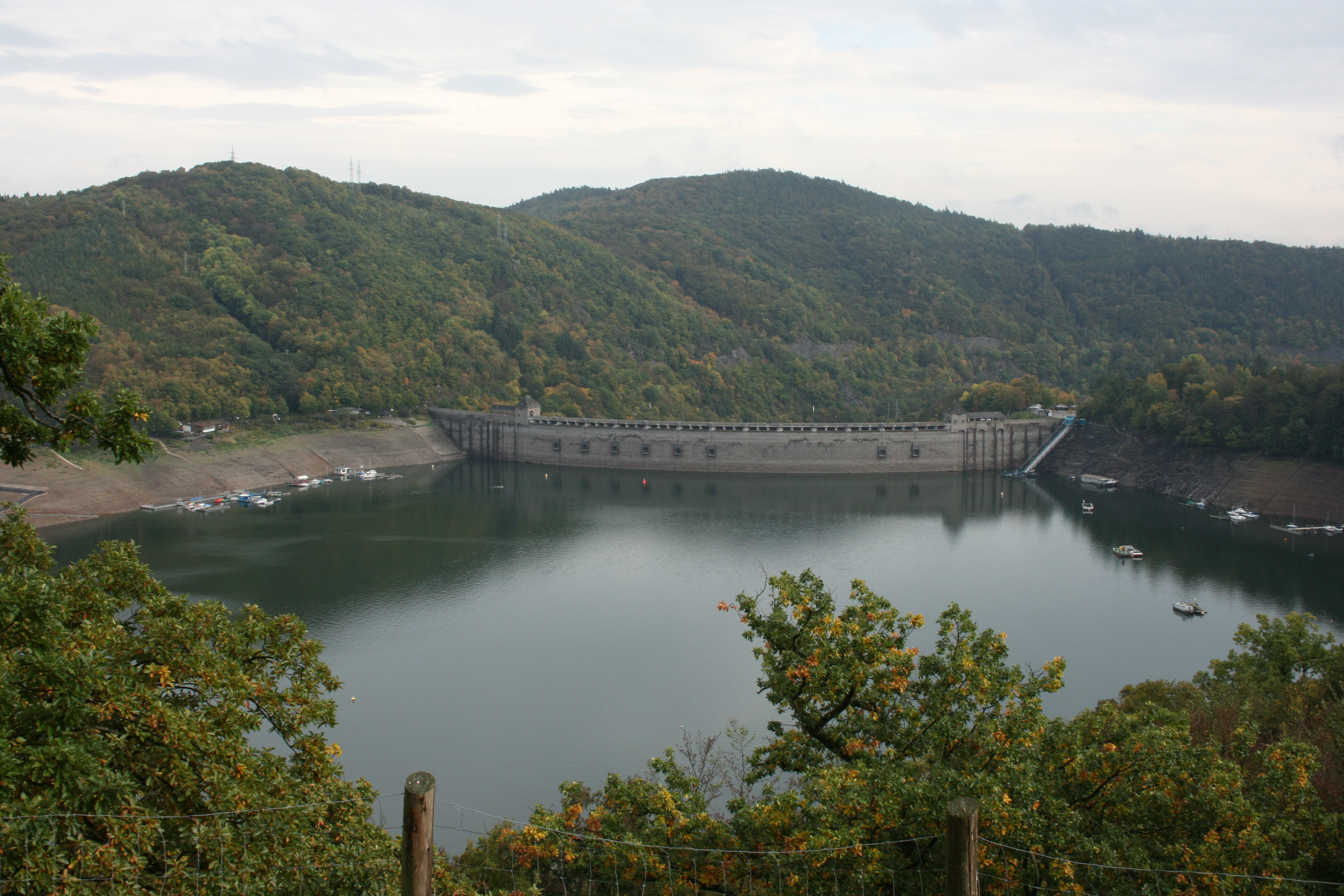
- View from the Edersee wildlife park to the dam wall of the Edersee, with clock head (left) and Michelskopf (center) in the background.

Highest point
- Elevation: 405 m (1,329 ft)

Geography
- Location: Landkreis Waldeck-Frankenberg, Hesse, Germany

Uhrenkopf is a mountain of Landkreis Waldeck-Frankenberg, Hesse, Germany.

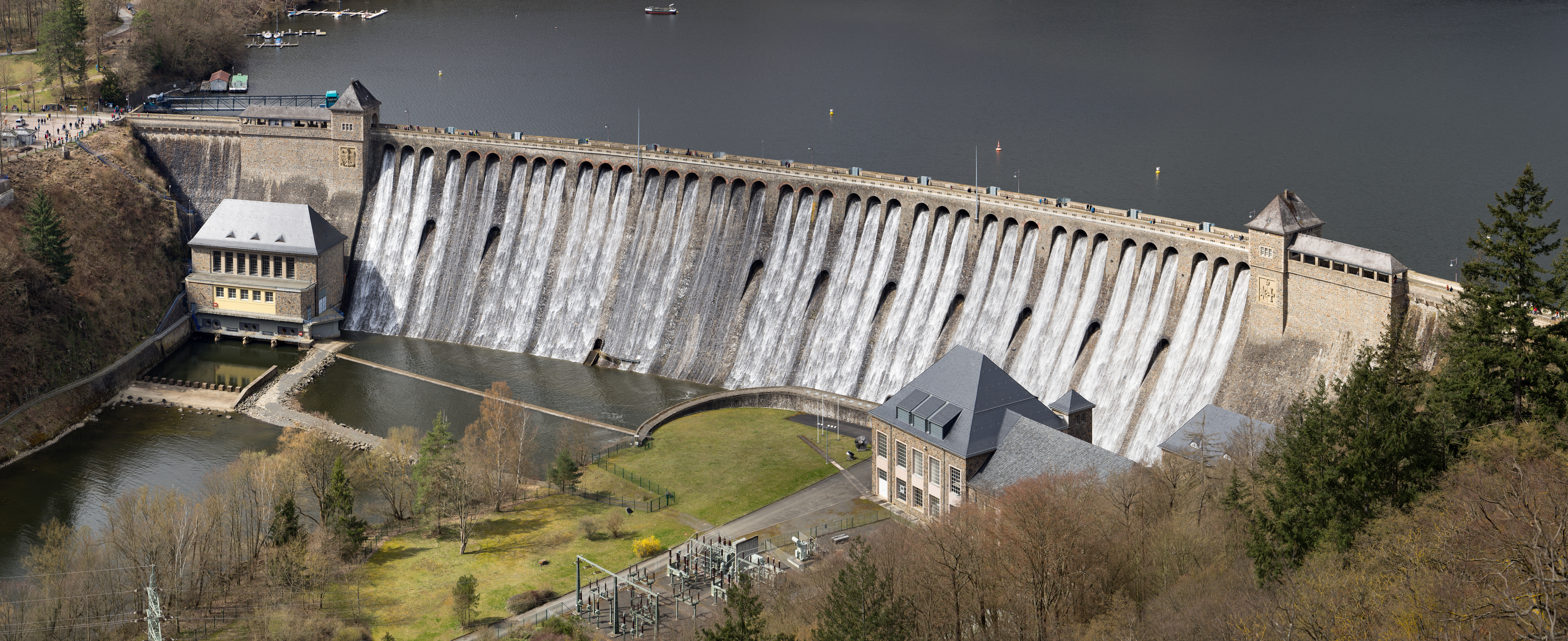
View from the viewpoint at the Uhrenkopf to the overflowing Edersee Dam
