= Rabenstein (Kellerwald) =

Mountain in Germany

Coordinates: 51°09′33″N 9°04′53″E

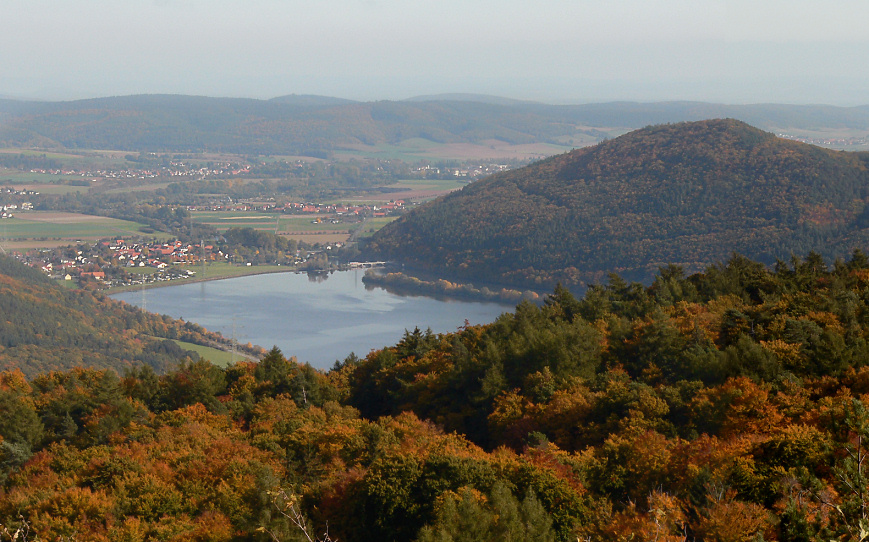
- View from Peterskopf into the Rabenstein gate with Affolderner See and Rabenstein (in the middle on the right); in the background the Wegaer Ederaue (Wildunger Senke) with the old forest.

Highest point
- Elevation: 439.3 m (1,441 ft)

Geography
- Location: Landkreis Waldeck-Frankenberg, Hesse, Germany

Rabenstein is a mountain of Landkreis Waldeck-Frankenberg, Hesse, Germany.
