= Großer Lindenkopf =

Coordinates: 50°11′02″N 8°20′00″E

Highest point
- Elevation: 499 m (1,637 ft)

Geography
- Location: Hesse, Germany

The Großer Lindenkopf is a hill in Hesse, Germany.
