= Herzberg (Taunus) =

Coordinates: 50°15′20″N 8°32′38″E

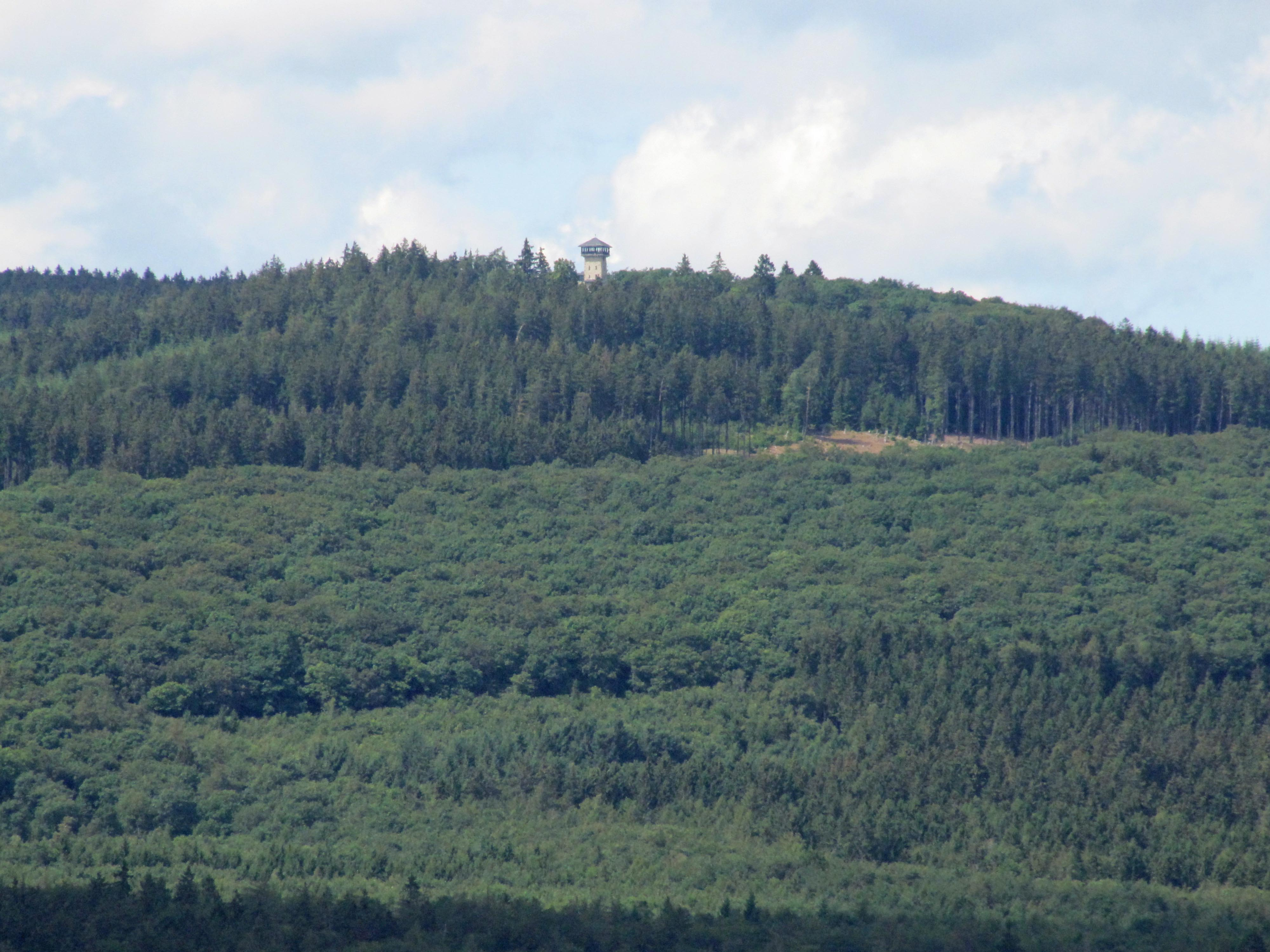
- Herzberg with the Herzbergturm tower visible through the trees

Highest point
- Elevation: 591.4 m (1,940 ft)

Geography
- Location: Hesse, Germany

Herzberg is a hill of Hesse, Germany.
