= Buchwaldskopf =

Coordinates: 50°10′39″N 8°19′29″E

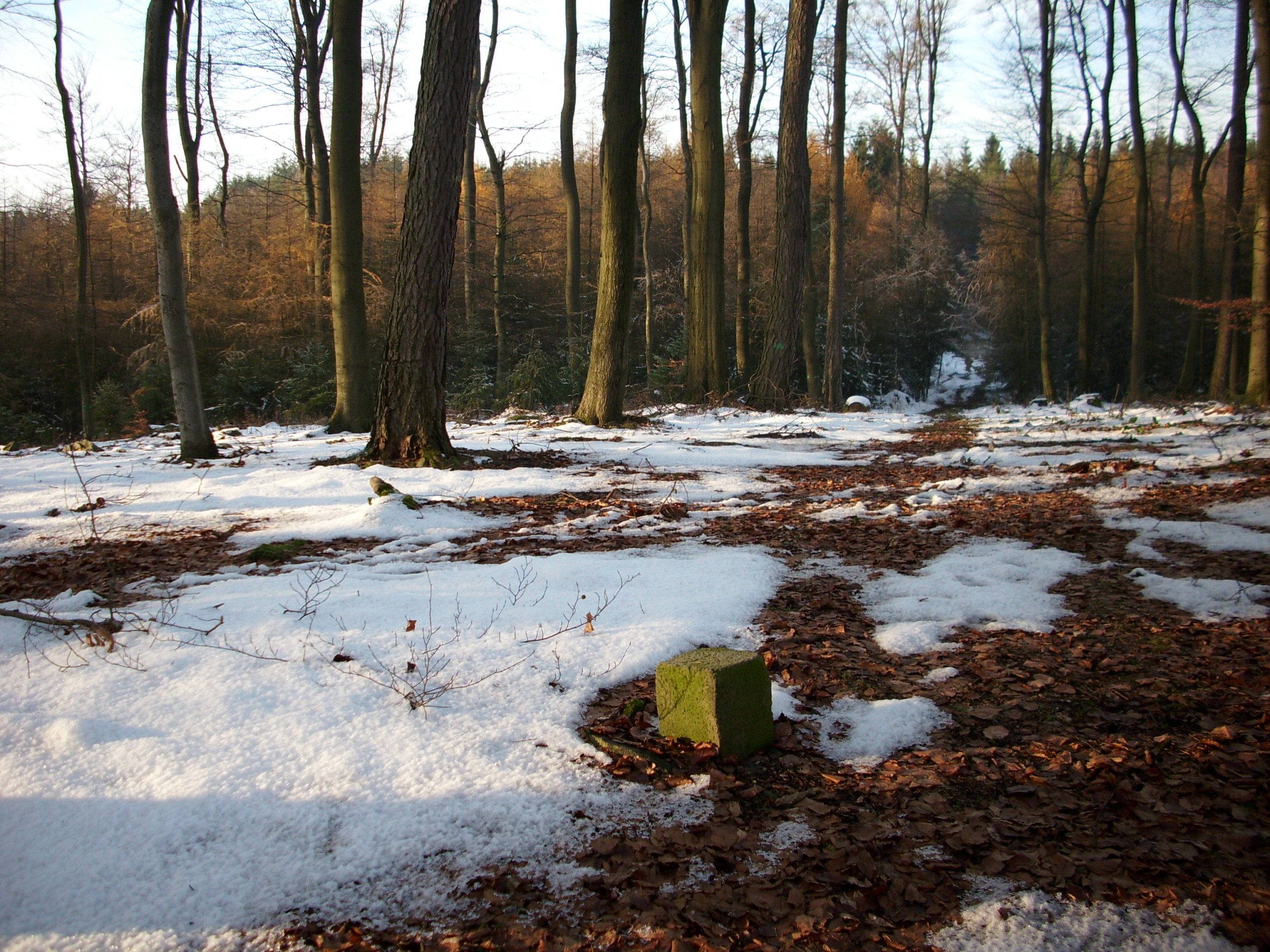
- Marking stone on the Buchwaldskopf at 492 m

Highest point
- Elevation: 492 m (1,614 ft)

Geography
- Location: Hesse, Germany

The Buchwaldskopf is a hill in the southern foothills of Mount Nickel in the Taunus near Oberjosbach, Niedernhausen in Hesse, Germany.

== Geography ==
=== Position ===
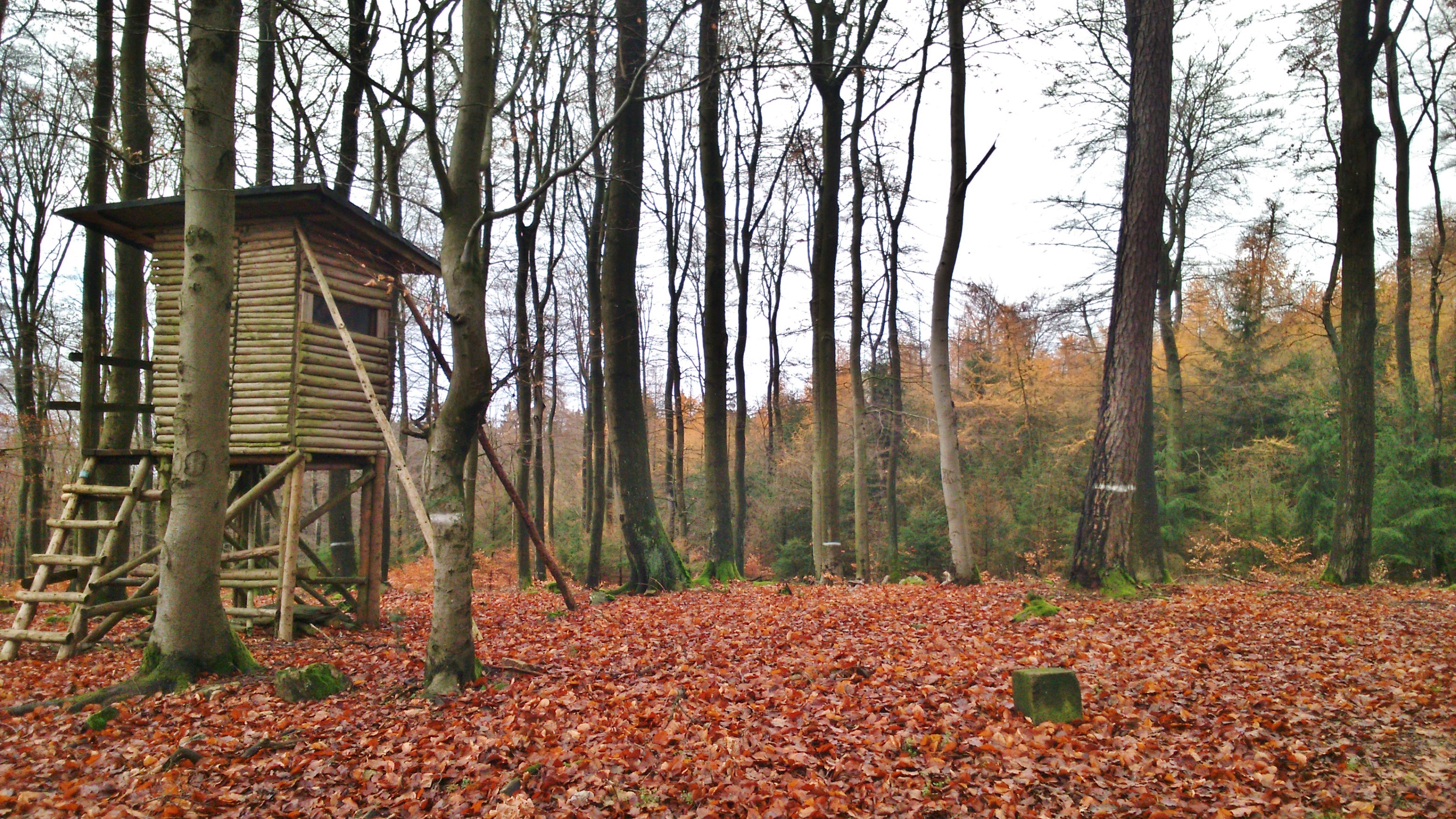
Buchwaldskopfsgipfel (Taunushauptkamm), view direction northwest

The Buchwaldskopf rises in the Eichelberger Mark as part of the Taunushauptkamm. In the Taunus Nature Park it is located in the district of Oberjosbach of the municipality of Niedernhausen, which is situated on the south-eastern flank of the Josbach.
