= Rassel (Taunus) =

Mountain in Hesse, Germany

Coordinates: 50°09′N 8°15′E

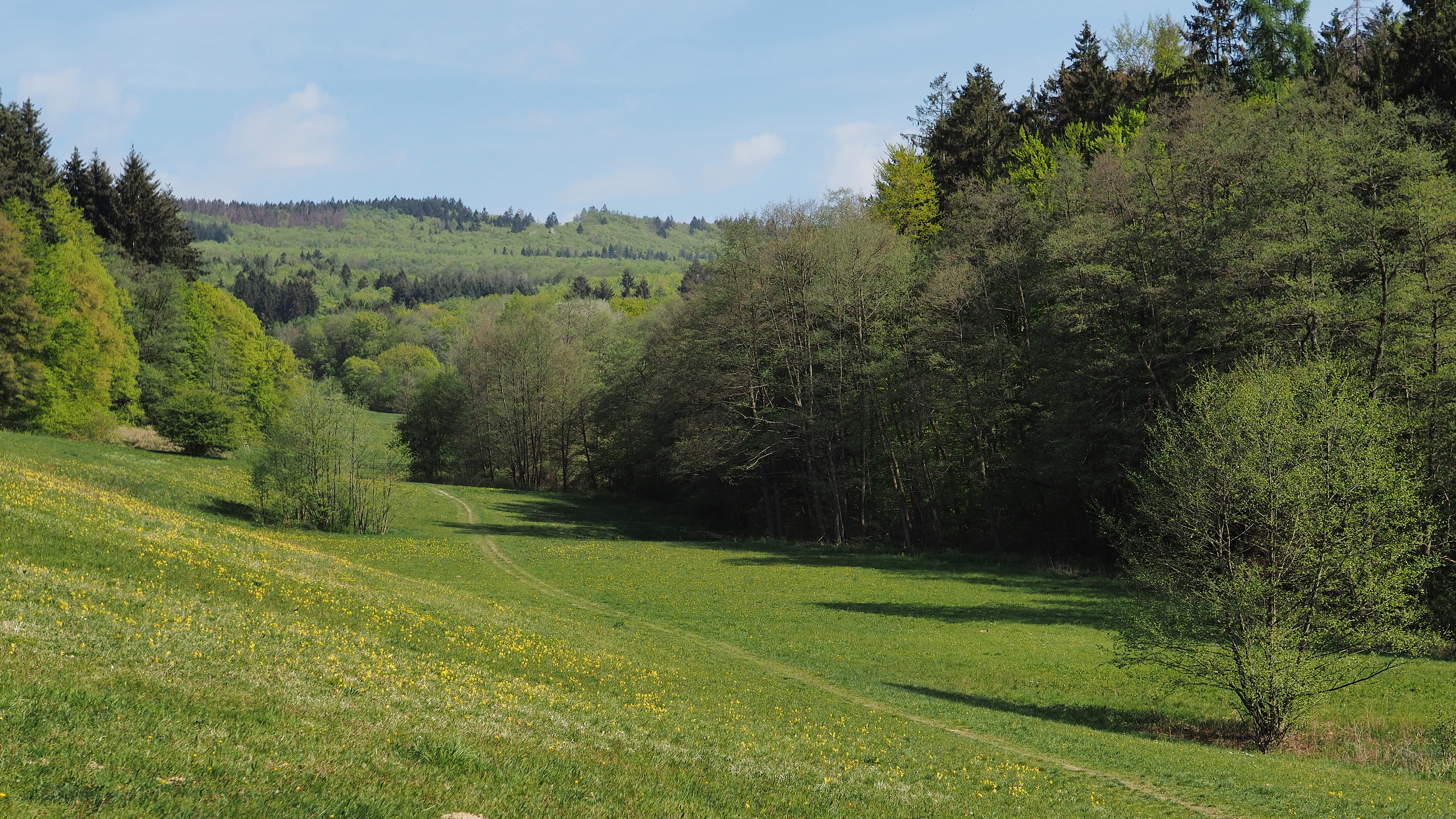
- Rassel seen from Goldsteintal

Highest point
- Elevation: 539 m (1,768 ft)

Geography
- Location: Hesse, Germany

Rassel is a mountain of Hesse, Germany. It lies in the north of the territory of the hessian capital Wiesbaden and is its highest independent elevation.
