= Sauklippe =

Mountain in Germany

Coordinates: 51°01′53″N 9°07′03″E

Highest point
- Elevation: 584.4 m (1,917 ft)

Geography
- Location: Schwalm-Eder-Kreis, Hesse, Germany

Sauklippe is a mountain peak in Schwalm-Eder-Kreis, Hesse, Germany.
