= Hundskopf (Hemberg) =

Hill in Hesse, Germany

Coordinates: 50°58′37″N 9°05′31″E

Highest point
- Elevation: 470.6 m (1,544 ft)

Geography
- Location: Schwalm-Eder-Kreis, Hesse, Germany

Hundskopf is a hill in the county of Schwalm-Eder-Kreis, Hesse, Germany.
