= Jeust =

Hill in Hesse, Germany

Coordinates: 50°59′N 9°02′E

Highest point
- Elevation: 585 m (1,919 ft)

Geography
- Location: Schwalm-Eder-Kreis, Hesse, Germany

Jeust is a hill in the county of Schwalm-Eder-Kreis, Hesse, Germany.
