= Hohes Lohr =

Mountain in Germany

Coordinates: 51°01′N 9°01′E

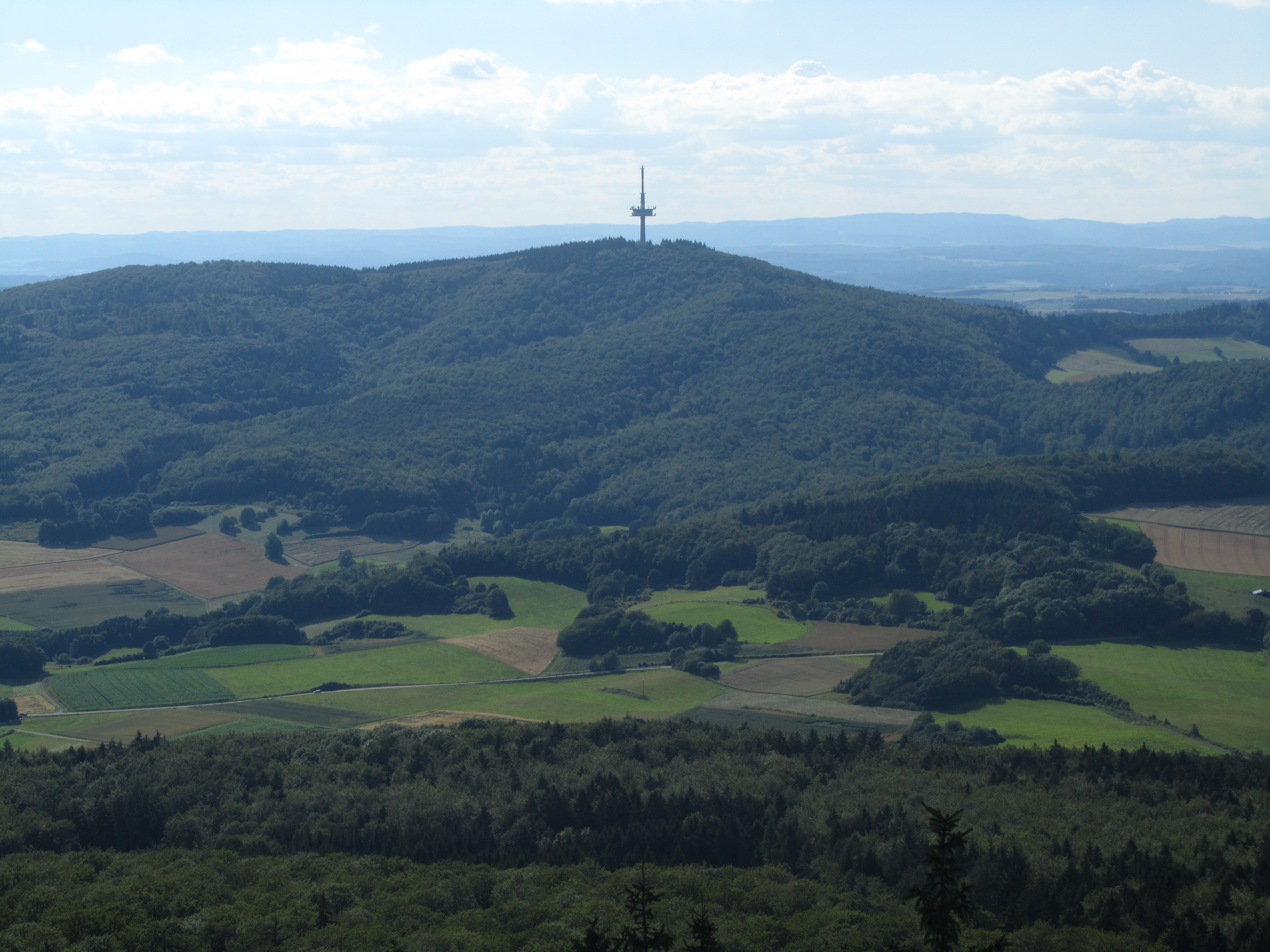
- The Hohes Lohr in the Kellerwald from the observation tower on the desert garden

Highest point
- Elevation: 656.7 m (2,155 ft)

Geography
- Location: Landkreis Waldeck-Frankenberg, Hesse, Germany

Hohes Lohr is a mountain of Landkreis Waldeck-Frankenberg, Hesse, Germany.
