= Sengelsberg =

Sengelsberg may refer to:

- Sengelsberg (Böhne), a mountain of Hesse, Germany
- Sengelsberg (Mandern), a mountain of Hesse, Germany
- Sengelsberg (Niedenstein), a mountain of Hesse, Germany
