= Sengelsberg (Niedenstein) =

Mountain in Germany

Coordinates: 51°14′41″N 9°19′07″E

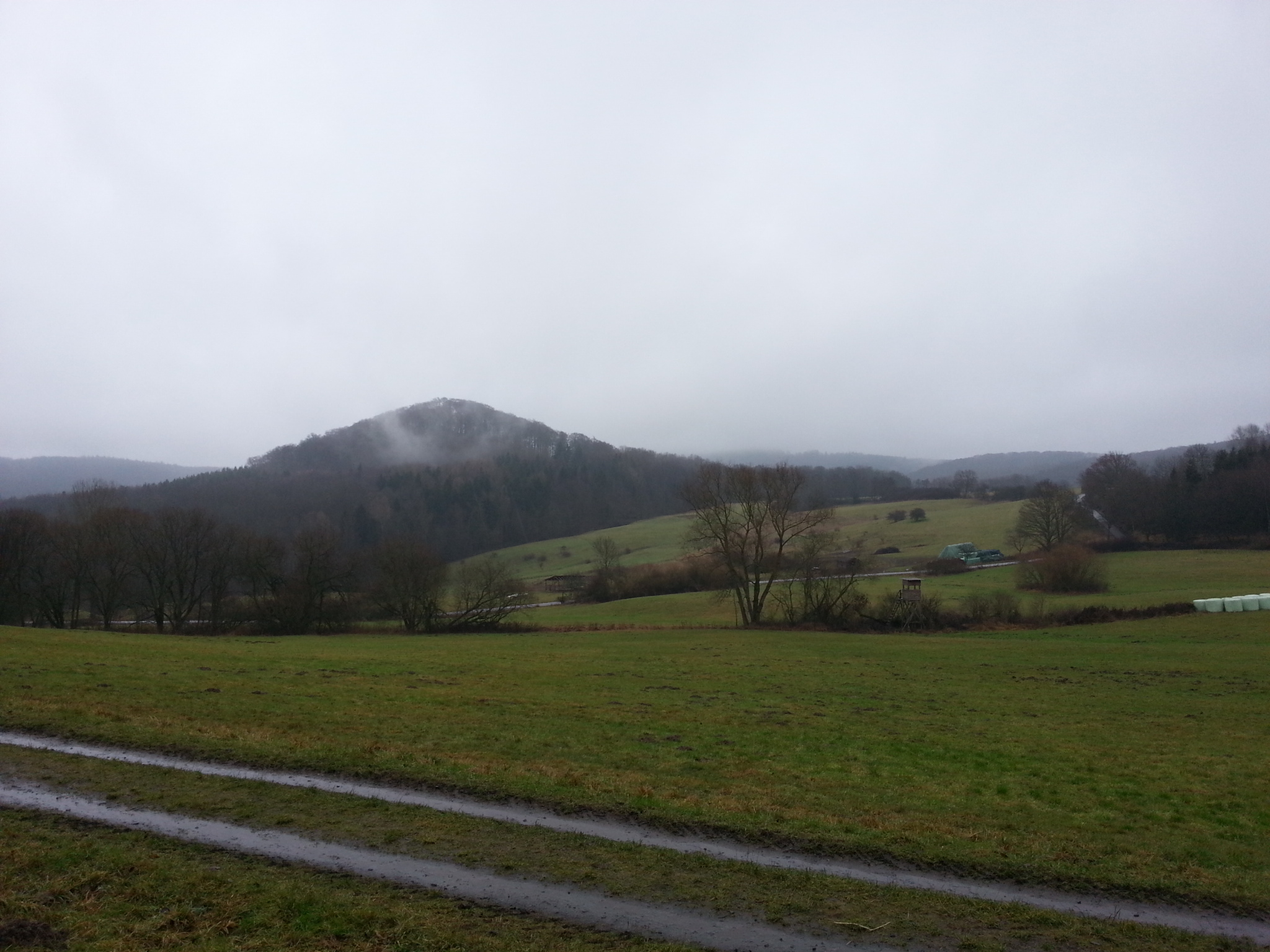

Highest point
- Elevation: 449 m (1,473 ft)

Geography
- Location: Schwalm-Eder-Kreis, Hesse, Germany

Sengelsberg is a mountain of Schwalm-Eder-Kreis, Hesse, Germany. It is 1,473 feet (449 m) at its peak.

== Geography ==
The Sengelsberg rises in the southern part of the Hinterhabichtswald hills at the junction with the Langenberge hills to the east. The summit of the mountain, located in the Habichtswald Nature Park, lies about 0.68 miles (1.09 km) northeast of the church in the center of Niedenstein and about 0.62 miles (1.00 km) north of the summit of the Niedensteiner Kopf.

The 22- hectare Sengelsberg hilltop natural monument (FND) is located on the mountain. The Wiehoff, a tributary of the Ems, flows past to the west. The H5 extra tour of the Habichtswaldsteig trail runs along the northeast flank of the mountain.
