= Sengelsberg (Mandern) =

Mountain in Germany

Coordinates: 51°06′05″N 9°10′34″E

Highest point
- Elevation: 381.8 m (1,253 ft)

Geography
- Location: Landkreis Waldeck-Frankenberg, Hesse, Germany

Sengelsberg is a mountain of Landkreis Waldeck-Frankenberg, Hesse, Germany.
