= West Hesse Highlands =

Heavily forested region of the Central Uplands in Germany

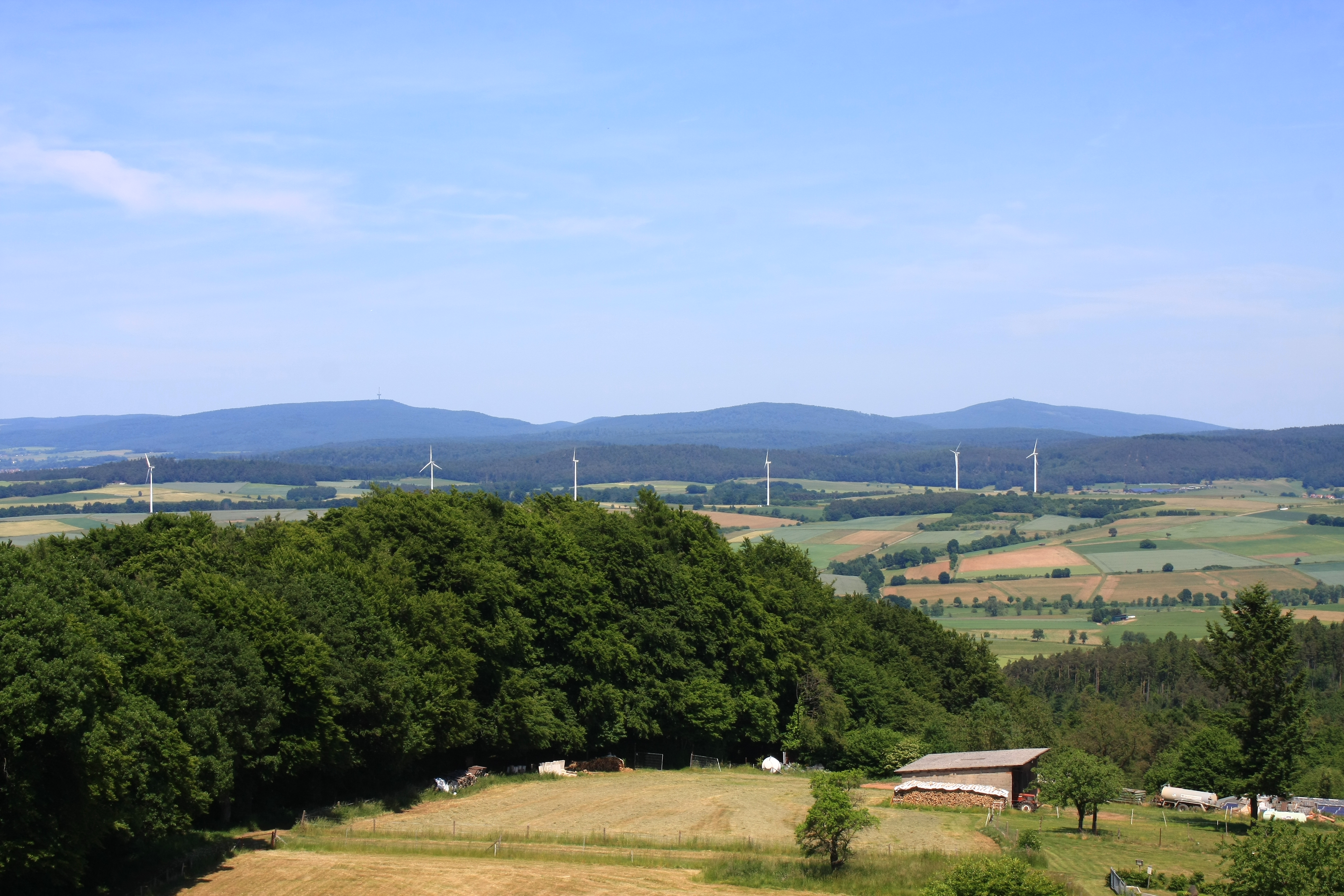
The Kellerwald in the West Hesse Highlands, with the Hohes Lohr (656.7 m, l), Jeust (585.0 m, m) and Wüstegarten (675.3 m, r); in front are the Gilserberg Heights

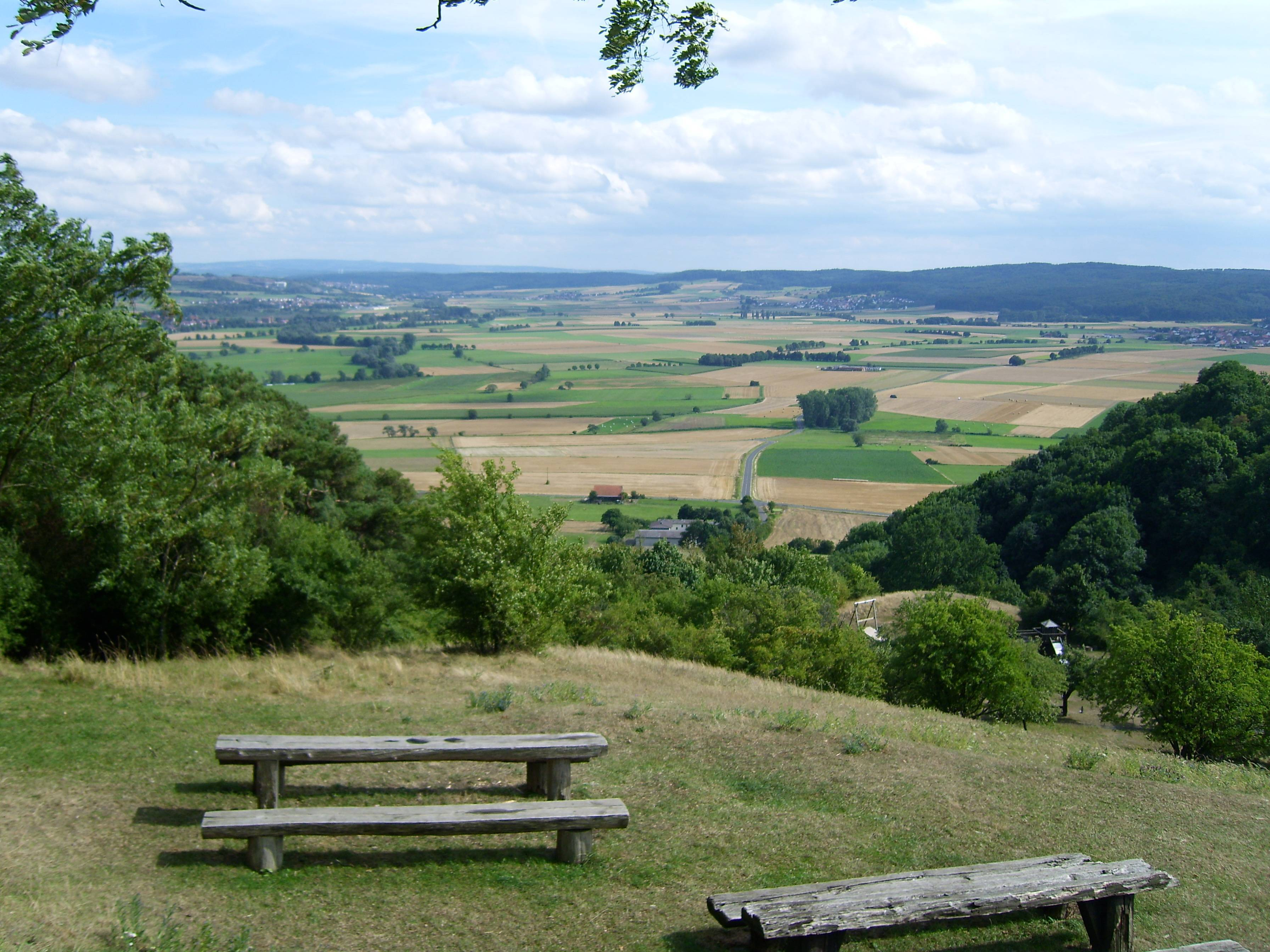
View from the Amöneburg of the southeastern Amöneburg Basin, the Vogelsberg foothills (right: the 405 and 407 m high Mardorfer Kuppe) and the "actual" Vogelsberg (left rear)

The West Hesse Highlands (German: Westhessisches Bergland), also known as the West Hessian Lowlands and Highlands (Westhessisches Berg- und Senkenland), are a heavily forested region of the Central Uplands in Germany. These highlands lie mainly within the state of Hesse, between that part of the Rhenish Massif right of the Rhine in the west, the Weser Uplands to the north, the Hessian Central Uplands (Note: Part of the East Hesse Highlands.) to the east and the Wetterau to the south.

The West Hesse Highlands form one of the major natural regions of Germany (Natural Region No. 34 or D46) and are part of the Central European Uplands as well as being the watershed between the Rhine and the Weser. They comprise a line of hill ranges in the west, running north-northeast to south-southwest on the shoulder of the Rhenish Massif and include the Kellerwald, and a fault trough in the east, the West Hesse Depression.

The West and East Hesse Highlands, together referred to as the Hesse Highlands, combine to form the geological unit known as the Hesse Depression (Note: Divided by Dickinson (1964) into the West and East Hesse Depressions and the Vogelsberg-Meissner and Spessart-Rhön Axes.) (Hessischen Senke), in its wider sense. Here, geologically young layers of Zechstein and Bunter sandstone, and in places even younger rocks like Muschelkalk, of the Jurassic, Paleogene and Neogene periods, have been preserved.

== Division of natural regions ==
The highlands comprise the following geographical subdivisions according to the Hesse Environmental Atlas (Umweltatlas Hessen):

- 34 West Hesse Lowlands and Highlands (Westhessisches Berg- und Senkenland)
  - 340 Waldeck Upland (Waldecker Tafel or Waldecker Tafelland)
    - 340.0 Waldeck Plain (Waldecker Gefilde)
    - 340.1 Waldeck Forest (Waldecker Wald)
  - 341 East Waldeck Border Lowlands (Ostwaldecker Randsenken)
    - 341.0 Middle Diemel Depression (Mitteldiemelsenke)
    - 341.1 Rhoda Depression (Rhoder Senken)
    - 341.2 Volkmarsen Basin (Volkmarser Becken)
    - 341.3 Wolfhagen Hills (Wolfhager Hügelland) (including the Elsberg Ridge and the Isthaberg
    - 341.4 Naumburg Depression and Ridge (Naumburger Senken und Rücken)
    - 341.5 Wildungen Depression (Wildunger Senke)
    - 341.6 Hessenwald
    - 341.7 Löwenstein Bottom (Löwensteiner Grund)
  - 342 Habichtswald Highlands (Habichtswälder Bergland)
    - 342.0 Habichtswald (including Langenberg)
    - 342.1 Habichtswald Depression (Habichtswälder Senke)
    - 342.2 Hinter Habichtswald Hills (Hinterhabichtswälder Kuppen)
    - 342.3 Dörnberg and Schreckenberge
    - 342.4 Malsburg Forest (Malsburger Wald)
  - 343 West Hesse Depression (Westhessische Senke)
    - 343.0 Schwalm
    - 343.1 Landsburg Depression (Landsburger Senke)
    - 343.2 Hessengau
    - 343.3 Kassel Basin (Kasseler Becken)
    - 343.4 Hofgeismar Depression (Hofgeismarer Rötsenke)
    - 343.5 North Habichtswald Foreland (Nordhabichtswälder Vorland)
  - 344 Kellerwald
    - 344.0 High Kellerwald (Hoher Kellerwald)
    - 344.1 Middle Kellerwald (Mittelkellerwald)
    - 344.2 Wildungen Highlands (Wildunger Bergland)
    - 344.3 Große Hardt
    - 344.4 Herzhausen-Hemfurth Eder Valley (Herzhausen-Hemfurther Edertal)
    - 344.5 Lower Kellerwald (Niederkellerwald)
  - 345 Burgwald
    - 345.0 Wetschaft Depression (Wetschaft-Senke)
    - 345.1 Northern Burgwald (Nördlicher Burgwald)
    - 345.2 Southern Burgwald (Südlicher Burgwald)
    - 345.3 Wohra Valley (Wohratal)
    - 345.4 Buntstruth
    - 345.5 Frankenberg Upland (Frankenberger Oberland)
  - 346 Upper Hessian Ridge (Oberhessische Schwelle)
    - 346.0 Gilserberg Heights (Gilserberger Höhen)
    - 346.1 Neustadt Saddle (Neustädter Sattel)
    - 346.2 Northern Vogelsberg Foreland (Nördliches Vogelsberg-Vorland)
  - 347 Amöneburg Basin (Amöneburger Becken)
    - 347.0 Ohm Depression (Ohmsenke)
    - 347.1 Ebsdorf Bottom (Ebsdorfer Grund)
  - 348 Marburg-Gießen Lahn Valley (Marburg-Gießener Lahntal)
    - 348.0 Marburg Highlands (including Marburg Ridge and Lahnberge) (Marburger Bergland (mit Marburger Rücken und Lahnbergen))
    - 348.1 Giessen Basin (Gießener Becken)
  - 349 Vogelsberg Foothills (Vorderer Vogelsberg)
    - 349.0 Lumda Plateau
    - 349.1 Ohm Valley (Ohmtal)
    - 349.2 Gießen Ridge (Gießener Landrücken)
    - 349.3 Laubach Hills (Laubacher Hügelland)

== Landscape ==
The tectonics of the Upper Rhine Rift, which continues along the eastern edge of the Rhenish Massif as far as the Upper Weser Hills, form highlands and lowlands here that merge into the volcanic East Hesse Highlands beyond the West Hesse Depression on their eastern perimeter. The ridges never attain the height of the loftiest peaks of the highlands to the east and west.

Although the two highland areas of this Central Upland region reach heights of 675 m (Kellerwald) and 615 m (Habichtswald), the typical height of the ridges is more like 400 m. Between them, there are large river valleys and depressions, in places up to 200 m lower.

=== Location of the geographical units ===
The Habichtswald highlands, which are up to 615 m high, in the north are separated from the peaks of the Waldeck Plateau (Waldeck Plateau) to the west, generally between 400 und 500 m high, by the East Waldeck Basin (East Waldeck Basin). Immediately south of the plateau is the 675 m high Kellerwald. The latter runs away to the south, splitting into two ridges mainly around 400 m high: the Burgwald, to the southwest, and the Upper Hessian Ridge to the south.

South of the Burgwald is the Marburg-Gießen Lahn Valley to the west (up to 380 m high near the Lahnberge) and the Amöneburg Basin to the east, which is flat apart from the singularity of the 365 m high Amöneburg itself. The basin rises southwards into the 405 m high (Lumda Plateau) Vogelsberg foothills. In the far east, the West Hesse Depression runs alongside almost all the ridges mentioned, following the valleys of the Schwalm (south) and Eder (north).

The northern part of the Burgwald, the southwestern Kellerwald and the Upper Hessian Ridge form part of the Rhine-Weser watershed and link the Rothaargebirge with the Vogelsberg.

The many depressions in the West Hesse Highlands and Lowlands have led to a buildup of loess soils, which is why arable farming is widespread here.

== Hills (selection) ==
- Wüstegarten (675 m) - Kellerwald
- Hohes Lohr (657 m) - Kellerwald
- Große Aschkoppe (640 m) - Kellerwald
- Hohes Gras (615 m) - Habichtswald
- Großer Bärenberg (601 m) - Habichtswald
- Hoher Dörnberg (579 m) - Habichtswald
- Isthaberg (523 m) - Singularity within the East Waldeck Basin
- Weidelsburg (492 m) - Singularity on the boundary of the East Waldeck Basin and Waldeck Plateau
- Hundskopf (471 m) - north Upper Hessian Ridge
- Heitzelberg (467 m) - Waldeck Plateau
- Wasserberg (412 m) - central Burgwald
- Mardorfer Kuppe (405 m) - Lumda Plateau
- Dachsberg (388 m) - central Upper Hessian Ridge
- Christenberg (387 m) - western Burgwald
- Burgholz (380 m) - west of the Upper Hessian Ridge
- Ortenberg (380 m) - Lahnberge
- Frauenberg (370 m) - Lahnberge
- Vogelheerd (370 m) - Marburg Ridge
- Amöneburg (365 m) - Singularity in the Amöneburg Basin

== Rivers ==
The main rivers in the West Hesse Highlands flow from the west out of the Rothaar Mountains: the Diemel (only right-hand tributaries, north), Eder (middle) and Lahn (only left-hand tributaries and river valley, south). Whilst the two rivers of the Weser river system in the extreme northeast (Diemel) and east (Eder) discharge into the West Hesse Depression, the Lahn leaves the Highlands after following a semi-circular course and heads southwest into the Rhine Massif again.

The right-hand tributaries of the Wetter, a tributary of the Nidda and thus part of the Main river system, only enter a small part of the Vogelsberg foothills in the extreme southeast. In addition, a few left tributaries of the Fulda from the Habichtswald highlands join the Fulda itself just below the Eder confluence.

=== Major rivers ===
The following table lists the most important rivers in the West Hesse Highlands, from north to south and internally in a downstream direction, i.e. mainly from west to east.

For a better overview or to sort them downstream based on the river system, enter the following DGKZ code numbers after the number 44 - Diemel, 428 - Eder, 24 - Fulda, 258 - Lahn and 2484 - Wetter.
Natural regions in italics are those outside the West Hesse Highlands; catchment areas and discharge quantities are given in italics where they only represent part of the total value (see footnotes below the table)!

| Name | Main river | Length [km] | Catchment area [km^{2}] | Discharge (MQ) [l/s] | Source region (of the tributaries) | Main units | DGKZ |
|---|---|---|---|---|---|---|---|
| Glinde | Diemel (r) | 8.4 | 35.3 | | Waldeck Plain | 340 | 44-32 |
| Orpe | Diemel (r) | 19.1 | 98.1 | 774.2 | Waldeck Plateau | 340 | 44-34 |
| Twiste*** | Diemel (r) | 40.8 | 446.7 | 2,685.9 | E. Sauerland Hills (Waldeck Plateau; Habichtswald - r) | 332 (340; 342 - r) | 44-4 |
| Calenberger Bach (Holsterbach)*** | Diemel (r) | 9.1 | 34.0 | 88.7 | Habichtswald | 342 | 44-52 |
| Warme | Diemel (r) | 33.1 | 157.3 | 1,321.4 | Habichtswald | 342 | 44-6 |
| Esse | Diemel (r) | 27.6 | 191.9 | 1,187.8 | West Hesse Depression | 343 | 44-8 |
| Itter* | Eder (l) | 11.6 | 76.1 | 771.3 | Waldeck Plain (E. Sauerland Hills) | 340 (332) | 428-531 |
| Aselbach* | Eder (l) | 6.6 | 18.1 | 135.4 | Waldecker Fields | 340 | 428-533 |
| Werbe* | Eder (l) | 13.2 | 42.3 | 322.6 | Waldeck Plateau | 340 | 428-537 |
| Reiherbach* | Eder (l) | 7.4 | 27.3 | 188.9 | Waldeck Plateau | 340 | 428-538 |
| Netze | Eder (l) | 12.9 | 29.0 | 169.5 | Waldeck Plateau | 340 | 428-554 |
| Elbe | Eder (l) | 33 | 123.5 | 731.3 | Waldeck Forest (Habichtswald) | 340 (342) | 428-6 |
| Ems | Eder (l) | 34.1 | 146.2 | 753.3 | Habichtswald | 342 | 428-92 |
| Pilgerbach | Eder (l) | 8.8 | 25.6 | 102.2 | Habichtswald | 342 | 428-98 |
| Bauna | Fulda (l) | 17.2 | 47.4 | 333.8 | Habichtswald | 342 | 42-92 |
| Grunnelbach | Fulda (l) | 9.2 | 24.1 | 150.0 | Habichtswald | 342 | 42-94 |
| Drusel** | Fulda (l) | 11.4 | 11.0 | 96.4 | Habichtswald | 342 | 42-952 |
| Ahne** | Fulda (l) | 21.4 | 21.1 | 295.5 | Habichtswald | 342 | 42-958 |
| Espe | Fulda (l) | 8.6 | 24.3 | 159.5 | Habichtswald | 342 | 42-992 |
| Nemphe | Eder (r) | 14.2 | 38.4 | 293.5 | Northern Burgwald | 345 | 428-198 |
| Lengelbach | Eder (r) | 11.4 | 25.9 | 209.9 | Northern Burgwald (Kellerwald - r) | 345 (344) | 428-32 |
| Lorfe | Eder (r) | 11.8 | 24.3 | 245.7 | Kellerwald | 344 | 428-512 |
| Banferbach* | Eder (r) | 7.2 | 16.4 | 213.9 | Kellerwald | 344 | 428-535 |
| Wesebach | Eder (r) | 25.3 | 63.4 | 618.2 | Kellerwald | 344 | 428-56 |
| Wilde | Eder (r) | 17.1 | 51.9 | 471.4 | Kellerwald | 344 | 428-58 |
| Schwalm | Eder (r) | 97.1 | 1,298.8 | 9,044.5 | Vogelsberg (Fulda-Haune Tableland, Knüll - r; U. Hessian Ridge, Kellerwald - l) | 350/1 (355, 356 - r; 346, 344 - l) | 428-8 |
| Wetschaft | Lahn (l) | 29.0 | 196.2 | 1,701.6 | Northern Burgwald (E. Sauerland Hills, Rothaargebirge - r) | 345 (332, 333) | 258-18 |
| Ohm | Lahn (l) | 59.7 | 983.8 | 7,949.8 | Vogelsberg (U. Hessian Ridge, Kellerwald, Burgwald - r; Vogelsberg foothills - l) | 350/1 (346, 344, 345 - r; 349 - l) | 258-2 |
| Zwester Ohm | Lahn (l) | 20.0 | 69.5 | 405.2 | Vogelsberg foothills | 349 | 258-334 |
| Lumda | Lahn (l) | 30.0 | 131.5 | 950.4 | Vogelsberg foothills | 349 | 258-36 |
| Wieseck | Lahn (l) | 24.3 | 119.6 | 663.5 | Vogelsberg foothills | 349 | 258-38 |
| Kleebach | Lahn (l) | 26.9 | 164.6 | 815.9 | Eastern Hintertaunus (Vogelsberg foothills - r) | 302 (349) | 258-396 |
| Lauter | Wetter (r) | 7.0 | 13.6 | 126.2 | Vogelsberg foothills | 349 | 2484-14 |
| Äschersbach | Wetter (r) | 13.6 | 42.9 | 325.3 | Vogelsberg foothills | 349 | 2484-2 |

(*: Edersee tributaries); **: Catchment area and discharge somewhat larger than given in the table, because the lower courses are combined with the Fulda sections; ***: Discharge value excluding confluence region in NRW)

=== Schwalm and Ohm ===
The two longest and biggest rivers in the table by far, the Schwalm and the Ohm, have a special role. They both emerge in the Vogelsberg, which the Ohm leaves after about 45% of its total length and 27% of its catchment area with roughly 35% of its volume (see also here). The Schwalm, on the other hand, leaves the Vogelsberg much earlier and receives about half its water volume at its mouth from right-hand tributaries from the East Hesse Highlands.

Because the river systems of both rivers drain several major areas, they may be considered more or less as major rivers.

Rivers which enter the Schwalm from the left out of the West Hesse Highlands include the following:

- Schwalm
  - Antreff (38,6 km, 115,3 km^{2}, 980.3 L/s, Vogelsberg/Northern Vogelsberg Foreland)
  - Wiera (14,8 km, 87,8 km^{2}, 589.5 L/s, Upper Hessian Ridge)
  - Gilsa (20,9 km, 93,6 km^{2}, 757.1 L/s, Gilserberg Heights/Kellerwald)
  - Urff (20,1 km, 41,7 km^{2}, 494.6 L/s, Kellerwald)

Significant tributaries from the middle and lower courses of the Ohm are:

- Ohm
  - various smaller left tributaries (Vogelsberg foothills)
  - Klein (r, 23,2 km, 163,4 km^{2}, 1122.9 L/s, Upper Hessian Ridge
  - Wohra (r, 33,8 km, 285,9 km^{2}, 2010.3 L/s, Kellerwald)
    - various smaller left tributaries (Gilserberg Heights)
    - Schweinfe (r, 13,4 km, 54,6 km^{2}, 412.0 L/s, Kellerwald)
    - Bentreff (r, 13,1 km, 48,9 km^{2}, 267.7 L/s, Northern Burgwald)
  - Rotes Wasser (r, 18,6 km, 51,0 km^{2}, 221.1 L/s, Burgwald)

Other rivers crossing the boundary of this natural region are the Twiste in the northwest, the Kleebach in the southwest and the Wetschaft in the west.

The Wetschaft, which is fed from the left by the Burgwald, receives more water at its confluence with the Treisbach (r, 16.8 km, 68.2 km^{2}) flowing out of the Rothaargebirge (810 L/s) than it delivers to that point (666.2 L/s), despite the fact that it has already been fed from the right by the East Sauerland Hills

The Kleebach on the other hand draws most of its water from the Eastern Hintertaunus, only receiving a small quantity of water from the Vogelsberg foothills via its right-hand stream, the Lückenbach (12.0 km, 38.9 km^{2}, 139 km).

Opposite, the Twiste rises almost in the East Sauerland Hills, but receives, apart from this source region, all its water from the West Hesse Highlands. Likewise, only a little water flows into the Itter in the northwest from the eastern slopes of those particular hills.

== Waterbodies ==
The largest and most important stretch of water in the West Hesse Highlands by far is the Edersee. Other lakes and reservoirs are listed below:

| Name | Dammed river | Area [ha] | Catchment area [km^{2}] | Discharge (MQ) [l/s] | Height above [NN] | Location | Main- units |
|---|---|---|---|---|---|---|---|
| Edersee | Eder | 11.800 | 1.406,1 | 21.795,4 | 245 | Kellerwald | 344 |
| Affolderner See | Eder | 165 | 1.452.4 | 22.104,5 | 204 | East Waldeck Basin | 341 |
| Twistesee | Twiste | 76 | 125,3 | 828,6 | 210 | Waldeck Forest | 340 |
| Antrift Valley Dam | Antreff | 31 | 61,6 | 674,0 | 281 | Northern Vogelsberg Foreland | 346 |
| Borkener See | (N/A) | 139 | 3,5 | | 177 | West Hesse Depression | 343 |
| Singliser See | (N/A) | 74 | | | 185 | West Hesse Depression | 343 |

== See also ==
- Natural regions of Germany
- East Hesse Highlands
- West Hesse Depression

== General sources ==
- LAGIS: Geological map of Hesse
- BfN
  - Map service
  - Landscape fact files (by major unit)
    - 340 (Waldeck Plateau)
      - Waldeck Forest
      - Waldeck Plain
    - 341 (East Waldeck Basin)
      - East Waldeck Basin
    - 342 (Habichtswald Highland)
      - Habichtswald Highland
    - 343 (West Hesse Depression)
      - West Hesse Depression
      - Kassel conurbation
    - 344 (Kellerwald)
      - Kellerwald
    - 345 (Burgwald)
      - Northern and Southern Burgwald
      - Edge of the Burgwald
    - 346 (Upper Hessian Ridge)
      - Gilserberg Heights
      - Neustadt Saddle
      - Northern Vogelsberg Foreland
    - 347 (Amöneburg Basin)
      - Amöneburg Basin
    - 348 (Vogelsberg foothills)
      - Vogelsberg foothills
    - 349 (Marburg-Gießen Lahn Valley)
      - Marburg Highland
      - Gießen-Wetzlar conurbation
      - Großenlinden Hills (with Wetterau)
