= East Hesse Highlands =

Hill range in Germany

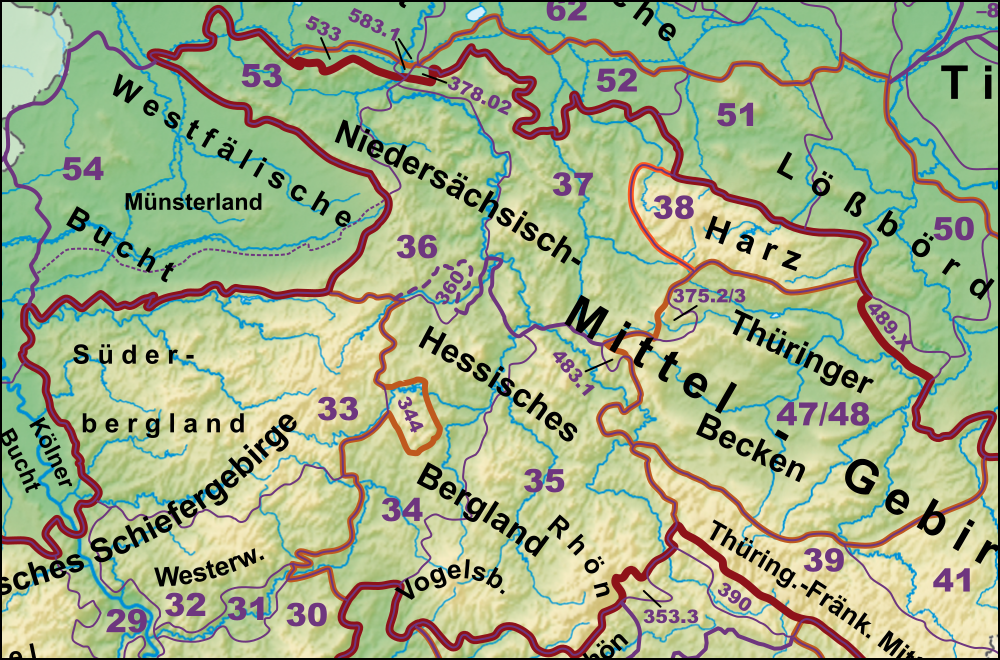
Main unit groups of the northern low mountain ranges (Lower Saxon Uplands, West and East Hessian Uplands, Harz Mountains, Thuringian Basin)

The East Hesse Highlands (German: Osthessisches Bergland) describes a heavily wooded range of hills lying mainly in the German state of Hesse, but also extending a little way into Lower Saxony to the north, Thuringia to the east and Bavaria to the southeast. The region is sandwiched between the West Hesse Depression to the west, the Weser Uplands to the north, the Thuringian Basin to the northeast, the northwestern edge of the Thuringian Forest to the east, the Spessart to the south and the Wetterau to the southwest.

The East Hesse Highlands forms a natural region (no. 35 or D47) and is both part of the European Central Uplands as well as the Rhine-Weser watershed. It includes the Vogelsberg-Meißner Axis, also known as the Hessian Central Uplands, the East Hesse Depression and the Rhön.

The West and East Hesse Highlands together form the Hesse Highlands and correspond to the geological unit of the Hesse Depression in its wider sense, because geologically recent layers of Zechstein and Bunter sandstone, and in places even younger Muschelkalk rocks, from the lower Jurassic and Tertiary periods have been preserved here.

== Natural divisions ==
The Hesse Environmental Atlas distinguishes the following major geographical units (three-figure numbers):

- 35 East Hesse Highlands
  - 350 Lower Vogelsberg
    - 350.1 Northern Lower Vogelsberg
    - 350.2 Northwestern Lower Vogelsberg
    - 350.3 Eastern Lower Vogelsberg
    - 350.4 Western Lower Vogelsberg
    - 350.5 Southern Lower Vogelsberg
    - 350.6 Giesel Forest
  - 351 High Vogelsberg (including Oberwald)
    - 351.0 Western High Vogelsberg
    - 351.1 Eastern High Vogelsberg
    - 351.2 Oberwald
  - 352 Fulda Depression
    - 352.0 Fliede Valley
    - 352.1 Fulda Basin
    - 352.2 Großenlüder-Lauterbach Trough
  - 353 Vorderrhön and Kuppenrhön (including Landrücken)
    - 353.0 Landrücken
    - 353.1 Western Rhön Foreland
    - 353.2 Kuppenrhön
    - 353.3 Eastern Rhön Foreland
  - 354 Hohe Rhön
    - 354.0 Southern Hohe Rhön
    - 354.1 Hochrhön
  - 355 Fulda-Haune Plateau
    - 355.0 Ottrau Upland
    - 355.1 Schlitz Land
    - 355.2 Kämmerzell-Hersfeld Fulda Valley
    - 355.3 Haune Plateaus
    - 355.4 Kirchheim Upland
  - 356 Knüll Upland
    - 356.0 Western Knüll Foreland
    - 356.1 Eastern Knüll Foreland
    - 356.2 Hochknüll
    - 356.3 Homberg Upland
  - 357 Fulda-Werra Uplands
    - 357.0 Neuenstein-Ludwigseck Ridge
    - 357.1 Bebra-Melsungen Fulda Valley
    - 357.2 Solztrottenwald and Seulingswald
    - 357.3 Sontra Hills
    - 357.4 Stölzinger Upland (Stölzinger Hills)
    - 357.5 Witzenhausen-Altmorschen Valley
    - 357.6 Melsungen Upland (including Günsterode Heights)
    - 357.7 Kaufungen Forest (including Söhre)
    - 357.8 Meissen Region (including High Meissner)
    - 357.9 Sontra Upland (including Schlierbachswald)
  - 358 Lower Werra Uplands
    - 358.0 Lower Werra Saddle
    - 358.1 Treffurt-Wanfried Werra Valley
    - 358.2 Eschwege Basin
    - 358.3 Sooden-Allendorf Werra Valley
    - 358.4 Witzenhausen-Hedemünden Werra Valley
    - 358.5 Rosoppe-Frieda Bay
    - 358.6 Höheberg
    - 358.8 Neuseesen-Werleshausen Heights
    - 358.9 Sandwald
  - 359 Salzungen Werra Highlands
    - 359.0 Stadtlangsfeld Hills
    - 359.1 Salzungen-Herleshausen Werra Valley
    - 359.2 Frauensee Hills

== Landscape characteristics ==
The East Hesse Highlands is bounded immediately to the east by the West Hesse Highlands and Lowlands. Almost all of the region is formed by Bunter sandstone and this defines both its relief and the surface of the land apart from occasional layers of overlying volcanic basalt.

All the prominent ridges are, at least partly, characterised by volcanic features. Between the Hoher Meissner (754 m) and Kaufungen Forest (up to 643 m high) in the north, the Knüll (636 m) in the centre, the Vogelsberg (773 m) in the southwest and the Rhön (950 m) in the southeast, there are numerous individual singularities which catalogue the volcanic activity between the two Central Uplands regions.

=== Location of geographical units ===
The northern part of this natural region includes the Fulda-Werra Uplands, with the Hoher Meissner and Kaufungen Forest, which descends to the Lower Werra Land in the northeast and into the Salzungen Werra Uplands in the southeast. In the southwest of the area are the Knüll Uplands, in the south the Fulda-Haune Plateau and in the southeast the Anterior Rhön and Kuppen Rhön (including the Landrücken) to the southeast, which run into the High Rhön still further to the southeast.

South of the Fulda-Haune Plateau and west of the Rhön are the Lower und High Vogelsberg hills, the former encircling the latter.

== Hills (selection) ==
- Wasserkuppe (950.2 m, High Rhön)
- Kreuzberg (927.8 m, Bavarian High Rhön)
- Dammersfeldkuppe (927.9 m, Border of Hesse and Bavaria, High Rhön)
- Heidelstein (925.7 m, Border of Hesse and Bavaria, High Rhön)
- Milseburg (835.2 m, Kuppen Rhön)
- Taufstein (773.0 m, High Vogelsberg)
- Kasseler Kuppe (753.6 m, Hoher Meissner)
- Gebaberg (750.7 m, in the east the Thuringian Anterior Rhön)
- Pleß (645.4 m, Salzunger Werra Highlands)
- Hirschberg (643 m, Söhre))
- Bilstein (641.2 m, Kaufungen Forest)
- Eisenberg (635.5 m, Knüll)
- Knüllköpfchen (633.8 m, Knüll)
- Rimberg (591.8 m, southeastern Knüll foothills in the Ottrau Highlands)

== Rivers ==
The central river in the area is the Fulda, which runs from south to north and leaves the East Hesse Highlands just before its confluence with the Werra in the West Hesse Depression. Left of the Fulda lie the Knüll and Vogelsberg, right of it the major part of the Fulda-Werra Highlands and the Rhön.

Right hand tributaries of the middle and lower reaches of the Schwalm, which lie almost entirely in the West Hesse Depression, drains the western part of the area, whilst left hand tributaries of the Werra drain the east. Only the source of the Schwalm and the mouth of the Werra lie within the Highlands themselves.

The tributaries are also north of the Rhine-Weser watershed, apart from the Ohm the only tributary of the Lahn, which is clearly oriented in a south-to-north direction, whilst the streams running into the Main tributaries of the Nidda, Kinzig and Franconian Saale flow south.

=== Table of most important rivers ===
The most important rivers of the East Hesse Highlands are listed in the following table, in clockwise order, beginning on the north side of the Rhine-Weser watershed by the Vogelsberg.
For a better overview or to see them listed in a downstream order, by river system, enter the DGKZ numbers after the number of the parent river followed by a dash.
River names and lengths listed in italics are those which clearly leave the region of the East Hesse Highlands (depressions on the perimeter excluded), where catchment areas and discharges are given in italics, it indicates that part of the catchment area is external and has significant tributaries from outside the East Hesse Highlands (see the notes below the table). Main rivers are linked if they are entirely located outside the area.

Name	Main river	Length [km]	Catchment area [km^{2}]	Discharge (MQ) [l/s]	Source region	Main geog. units	DGKZ
Antreff	Schwalm (l)	38.6	115.3	980	Vogelsberg	350/1	4288-2
Schwalm	Eder	97.1	1,298.8	9,044	Vogelsberg	350/1	428-8
Berfa	Schwalm (r)	20.0	42.2	218	Ottrau Upland	355.0	4288-16
Grenff	Schwalm (r)	22.0	86.4	711	Ottrau Upland	355.0	4288-32
Efze	Schwalm (r)	38.2	220.5	1,481	Knüll	356	4288-8
Rohrbach	Fulda (l)	18.0	73.9	576	Neuenstein-Ludwigseck Ridge	357.0	42-714
Geisbach	Fulda (l)	22.1	76.2	487	Knüll	356	42-596
Aula	Fulda (l)	22.6	124.8	919	Knüll	356	42-56
Jossa	Fulda (l)	22.9	122.0	780	Schlitzer Land	355.1	42-54
Schlitz	Fulda (l)	43.3	314.6	3,715	Vogelsberg	350/1	42-4
Lüder	Fulda (l)	36.4	190.0	2,306	Vogelsberg	350/1	42-36
Fliede	Fulda (l)	22.1	271.4	3,627	Landrücken	353.0	42-2
Fulda	Weser	220.7	6,946,6	66,924	Hohe Rhön	354	42
Lütter	Fulda (r)	17.5	50.7	672	Hohe Rhön	354	42-14
Haune*	Fulda (r)	66.5	499.0	4,113	Kuppenrhön	353.2	42-6
Nüst	Haune (r)	22.8	97.2	1,029	Kuppenrhön	353.2	426-6
Solz	Fulda (r)	21.4	91.5	682	Kuppenrhön	353.2	42-712
Ulfe	Fulda (r)	27.6	71.5	552	Seulingswald	357.2	42-72
Pfieffe	Fulda (r)	21.5	117.1	1,235	Stölzinger Hills	357.4	42-78
Losse	Fulda (r)	28.9	120.6	1,418	Stölzinger Hills	357.4	42-96
Nieste	Fulda (r)	21.8	88.1	921	Kaufungen Forest	357.7	42-98
Gelster	Werra (l)	18.2	60.6	771	Söhre	357.7	41-96
Wehre**	Werra (l)	36.5	451.7	4,147	Söhre	357.7	41-8
Taft***	Ulster (l)	11.8	61.6	564	Kuppenrhön	353.2	414-8
Ulster	Werra (l)	55.5	421.0	5,279	Hohe Rhön	354	41-4
Weid	Ulster (r)		36.0	539	Hohe Rhön	354	414-4
Felda	Werra (l)	38.8			Hohe Rhön	354	41-?
Streu	Franconian Saale (r)	35.5			Hohe Rhön	354	244-2
Brend	Franconian Saale (r)	26.2			Hohe Rhön	354	244-32
Sinn	Fränkische Saale (r)	61.1			Hohe Rhön	354	244-8
Schmale Sinn	Sinn (r)	27.6	103.6	1,439	Hohe Rhön	354	2448-2
Steinaubach	Kinzig	23.2	64.8	798	Vogelsberg	350/1	2478-16
Salz	Kinzig (r)	29.8	91.3	1,219	Vogelsberg	350/1	2478-2
Bracht	Kinzig (r)	31.5	117.7	1,644	Vogelsberg	350/1	2478-4
Seemenbach	NidThe (l)	37.4	145.0	1,452	Vogelsberg	350/1	2486-6
Nidder	Nidda (l)	68.6	435.7	3,875	Vogelsberg	350/1	248-6
Nidda	Main (r)	89.7	1,942.4	13,065	Vogelsberg	350/1	24-8
Horloff	Nidda (r)	44.5	279.2	1,004	Vogelsberg	350/1	248-2
Wetter	Nidda (r)	68.8	517.0	2,994	Vogelsberg	350/1	248-4
Seenbach	Ohm (l)	18.3	96.5	1,288	Vogelsberg	350/1	2582-2
Ohm	Lahn	59.7	983.8	7,950	Vogelsberg	350/1	258-2
Felda	Ohm (r)	29.9	107.4	1,276	Vogelsberg	350/1	2582-4

(*: the source of the Haune lies, strictly speaking, still just in the Western Rhön Foreland, 353.1
**: the Wehre rises, strictly speaking, in the Rommerode Hills, 357.53, the eastern foreland of the Söhre)
***: the values for catchment area and discharge of the Taft are limited to the Hessian part and do not include its confluence area in Thuringia)

The following parts of the (catchment areas of the) rivers listed are not in the East Hesse Highlands:

- Antreff - entire middle and lower course in the Upper Hesse Ridge
- Schwalm - almost all left tributaries in various parts of the West Hesse Highlands; river lies on the western boundary of the area
- Fulda - mouth lies on the northwestern border; left tributaries above the Eder lie outside; of the catchment area of the Eder, which is largely in the Rest-Fulda catchment area, only the right-hand tributaries of the Schwalm come from the East Hesse Highlands, whilst the Eder is fed by the West Hesse Highlands apart from the upper course which is fed by the Süder Uplands.
- Streu - lower course in the Grabfeld
- Brend - middle and lower reaches lie, without major tributaries, in the part of the Südrhön belonging to the Spessart region
- Sinn - middle and lower courses lie in various parts of the Spessart
- Bracht and Seemenbach - lower courses lie, without major tributaries, in the Büdingen Forest region of the Spessart
- Nidder - from the Seemenbach it runs along the eastern boundary of the Wetterau to the Ronneburg Hills, but without any major tributaries
- Horloff - middle and lower reaches on the southeastern boundary; (only moderately sized) right tributaries from the Wetterau
- Nidda - from the confluence with the Horloff it runs into the Wetterau; where it is joined by the Wetter and Nidder
- Wetter - leaves the East Hesse Highlands shortly after its source and nimmt draws water from, inter alia, the Taunus.
- Ohm - from the confluence with the Felda it runs through various parts of the West Hesse Highlands

== See also ==
- Natural regions of Germany
- West Hesse Highlands
- West Hesse Depression

== General sources ==
- LAGIS: Geological map of Hesse
- BfN
  - Map services
  - Landscape fact file (by major units)
    - 350 (Lower Vogelsberg)
      - Lower Vogelsberg
      - Giesel Forest (including "Fulda Foreland of the Vogelsberg")
    - 351 (High Vogelsberg)
      - High Vogelsberg
    - 352 (Fuldaer Senke)
      - Fulda Depression
    - 353 (Vorder- and Kuppenrhön (including Landrücken))
      - Landrücken and Western Rhön Foreland
      - Kuppenrhön
      - Eastern Rhön Foreland
    - 354 (Hohe Rhön)
      - Hohe Rhön
    - 355 (Fulda-Haune Plateau)
      - Fulda-Haune Plateau (excluding Fulda Valley)
      - Kämmerzell-Hersfeld Fulda Valley
    - 356 (Knüll-Upland)
      - Knüll (excluding Homberg Upland)
      - Homberg Upland
    - 357 (Fulda-Werra-Highlands)
      - Fulda-Werra Highlands (excluding Kaufungen Forest, Meißner Region and Fulda Valley)
      - Meißner Region
      - Kaufungen Forest (excluding Söhre)
      - Bebra-Melsungen Fulda Valley
    - 358 (Lowe WerraHighlands)
      - Lower Werra Country (excluding Lowe Werra Valley)
      - Sooden-Allendorf and Witzenhausen-Hedemünden Werra Valley
    - 359 (Salzunger WerraHighlands)
      - Salzungen Werra Highlands (excluding Werra Valley)
      - Salzungen-Herleshausen Werra Valley
