= List of lakes of Hesse =

Hesse

This list of lakes in Hesse includes lakes, bathing lakes, reservoirs and ponds in the German state of Hesse.

== A ==
- Aartalsee

== B ==
- Borkener See

== D ==
- Diemelsee (together with North Rhine-Westphalia)

== E ==
- Edersee

== G ==
- Gombether See
- Grüner See

== N ==
- Niederwaldsee

== R ==
- Riedsee bei Leeheim

== S ==
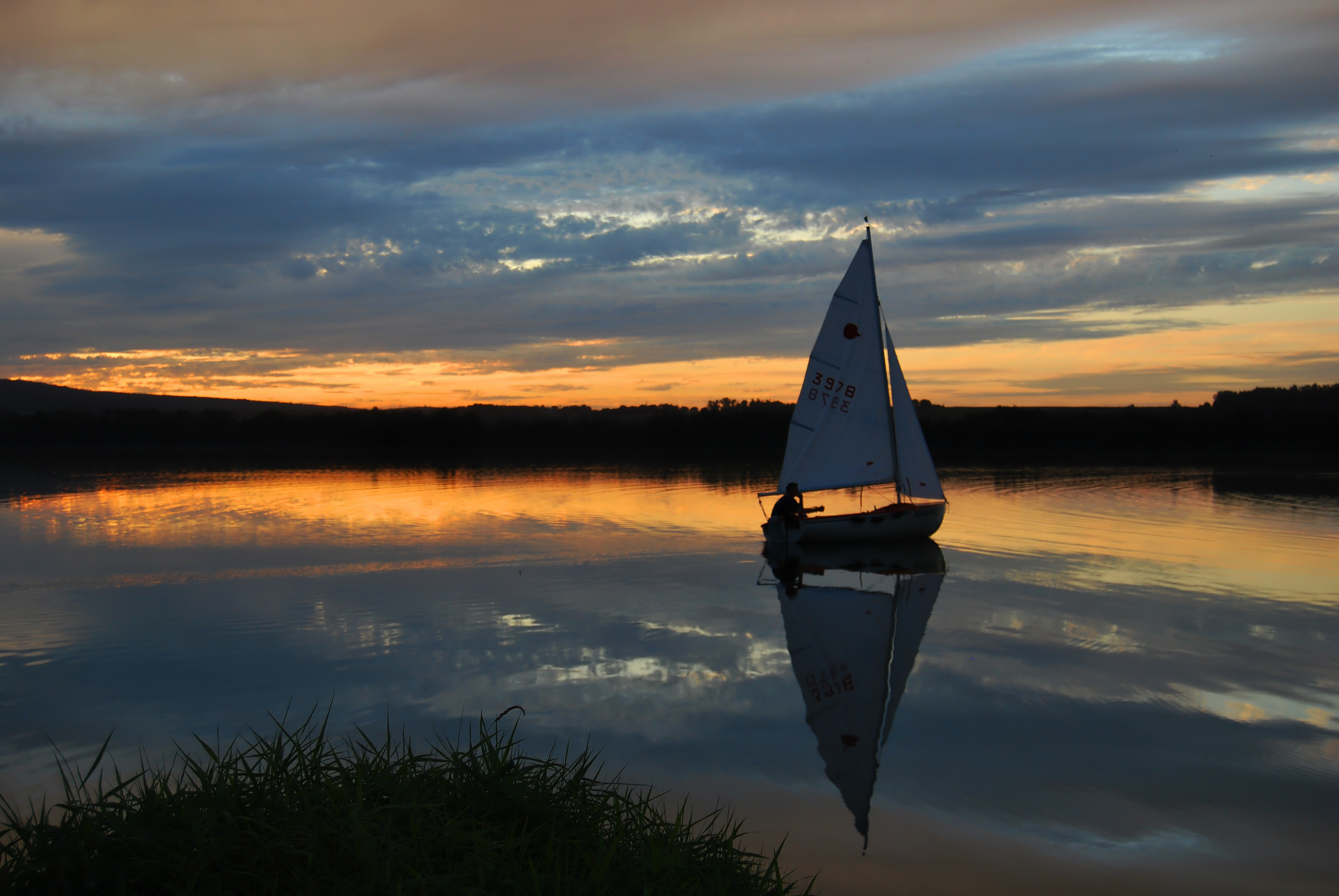
Singliser See

- Seeweiher
- Singliser See
- Stellbergsee
- Stockelache

== T ==
- Twistesee

== See also ==
- List of lakes of Germany
