= West Hesse Depression =

The West Hesse Depression (German: Westhessische Senke) is part of the West Hesse Highlands and Lowlands region in the north of the German state of Hesse. Like the East Hesse Depression, it is a series of separate depressions that form a natural corridor and have been an important historical trade route.

Extent of the West Hesse Depression

== Geography and geology ==
=== Geographical location ===
The West Hesse Depression runs along the valleys of the Schwalm, Eder, Fulda, Esse and Diemel roughly from Alsfeld in the south to Bad Karlshafen in the north. It separates the East Hesse Highlands (major regional group 34 or D46), including the Knüll hills and Kaufungen Forest in the east, from the West Hesse Highlands (35 or D47), including the Kellerwald and Habichtswald in the west and is itself part of the West Hesse Highlands, within which it is included as geographical unit 343. Its southern boundary is formed by the northern foothills of the Vogelsberg, which is part of the Hessian Central Uplands within the East Hesse Highlands region.

=== Geology ===
During the Mesozoic era, the deposits of the Zechstein Sea were overlaid with sand, which then developed into the Bunter sandstone. As a result of further tectonic uplift and subsidence, Muschelkalk was deposited on top of the Bunter sandstone layer. In the subsequent Keuper geological stage, the landscape rose, and flooding alternated with the formation of swamps. In places the land also appears to have been covered by older phases of the Lias epoch.

The subsequent Alpine folding movements have had a lasting effect on the area. These caused the rock to fracture along fault lines, which resulted in rift grabens and enabled volcanic magma to reach the surface. At the same time the surrounding hills were eroded by weathering and rivers. So Keuper and Muschelkalk ridges emerged that ran through the area of Bunter sandstone in a northeast and northwest direction. As the Bunter weathered, layers of Palaeozoic rock were exposed again.

As the Cainozoic era began, the West Hesse Depression emerged as part of a great rift valley from Scandinavia to the Mediterranean Sea; the Mediterranean-Mjøsa Zone. This zone is a succession of grabens that run from the Rhone Valley through the Rhine Rift, the Wetterau and the Gießen Basin, below the Vogelsberg foothills to the Amöneburg Basin, and from there over the Neustadt Saddle in the West Hesse Depression and continuing along the Leine Graben to the Oslo Rift valley.

More recent sea level changes led in the Tertiary period to flooding of the region and the deposition of sand. This covered the extensive forests that had grown up in the warm, moist climate, producing the lignite deposits evident today. Not until the most-recent period, the Quaternary, did the fertile loess soils of the West Hesse Depression appear.

On the river plains of the Schwalm, Eder und Fulda the land of the West Hesse Depression is flat. Elsewhere the West Hesse Depression is a succession of ridges that rise to 300 m above NN (Weinkopf near Borken 298 m). The hill country is mainly covered by loess. In the north there are occasional rounded hills (Kuppen) of basalt and this is also where Mesozoic rocks are found at the surface; whereas Tertiary sediments of gravel, sand and clay predominate in Hessengau. In the Tertiary layers of the Borken Basin there are rich deposits of lignite.

=== Rivers ===
The valleys of the following rivers are within the West Hesse Depression (rivers in brackets only drain the depression):

- (Weser)
  - (l) Fulda (lower course, not quite to its confluence)
    - (l) Eder (lower courses)
      - (l) Ems (Eder) (middle and lower course)
      - (r) Schwalm (Eder) (middle and lower course)
      - (l) Pilgerbach
    - (l) Bauna (lower course)
  - (l) Diemel (only the very lowest course)
    - (r) (Warme)
      - (r) Nebelbeeke
    - (r) Esse

Ecologically important lakes within the depression are those that were created following the cessation of mining activity: the Borkener See and Singliser See.

=== Sub-divisions ===
Natural regions of the West Hesse Depression
Number	Natural region	Area km^{2}	Topographical map
343.0	Schwalm		
343.00	Schwalm Bottom	17,83	TK25 Nr. 5121
343.01	Wasenberg Terraces	75,75	TK25 Nr. 5121
343.02	Alsfeld Hollow	61,71	TK25 Nr. 5221
343.1	Landsburg Depression		
343.10	Trockenerfurth Plain	12,53	TK25 Nr. 4921
343.11	Landsburg Bottom	36,20	TK25 Nr. 5021
343.12	Frielendorf Hills	77,78	TK25 Nr. 5021
343.13	Borken Basin	24,29	TK25 Nr. 4921
343.2	Hessengau		
343.20	Homberg Bay	42,02	TK 25 Nr. 4922
343.21	Wabern Plain		
343.210	Schwalmaue	22,43	TK25 Nr. 4921
343.211	Fritzlar Eder Corridor	48,55	TK25 Nr. 4821
343.22	Großenenglise Plateau	18,38	TK25 Nr. 4921
343.23	Fritzlar Börde	96,37	TK25 Nr. 4822
343.24	Gudensberg Kuppen Ridge	29,72	TK25 Nr. 4822
343.3	Kassel Basin	250,62	TK25 Nr. 4723
343.30	Kassel-Fulda Aue	17,49	TK25 Nr. 4623
343.31	Kassel Trough	5,91	TK25 Nr. 4622
343.4	Hofgeismar Depression	138,45	TK25 Nr. 4422
343.5	North Habichtswald Foreland		
343.50	Westuffeln Depression	31,77	TK25 Nr. 4522
343.51	Langenberg and Staufenberg Plateau	29,52	TK25 Nr. 4522

Taken from the Hesse Environmental Atlas (Umweltatlas Hessen):

The natural region of the West Hesse Depression is characterised by numerous smaller depressions and plains.

From its southern end, the West Hesse Depression runs in a northwesterly direction through the Schwalm (region) (343.0) which surrounds the upper and middle course of the river of the same name, beginning with the Alsfeld Hollow (Alsfelder Mulde) followed by the Wasenberg Terraces and the Schwalm Bottom (Schwalmgrund).

Continuing in a northeasterly direction around the middle reaches of the Schwalm is the Landsburg Depression (343.1) with its sub-units the Landsburg Bottom, Frielendorf Hills, Trockenerfurth Plain and the Borken Basin.

The transition into the Hessengau region (343.2) with the confluence of the Schwalm and the Eder continues northeast via the regional sub-units of the Homberg Bay, Wabern Plain (Schwalmaue and Fritzlar Eder Corridor), Großenenglis Plateau, Fritzlar Börde and the Gudensberg Kuppen Ridge into the Kassel Basin.

In the Kassel Basin (343.3) by the lower course of the Fulda, with its sub-units the Kassel Fulda Floodplain and Kassel Trough, the West Hesse Depression swings northwest again and leaves the catchment area of the Fulda, to enter that of the Diemel.

To the northwest it runs along the Nebelbeeke and the Warme which drains into the Diemel, and into the North Habichtswald Foreland with its sub-units of the Westuffeln Depression and the Langenberg and Staufenberg Plateau.

Northeast of the Kassel Basin are the Hofgeismar Depression, which follows the Esse (Diemel) and finally the lower course of the Diemel until just before its confluence with the Weser. This natural region has an area of 138.45 square kilometres and is the second largest within the West Hesse Depression.

=== Origin of the name ===
The origin of the name "West Hesse" is derived from the neighbouring natural region of the East Hesse Highlands. The catchment area draining northwards into the River Weser can be referred to as a North Hesse Depression.

== Ecology ==
=== Conservation status ===
In the West Hesse Depression are:

- Special Areas of Conservation: 2,6%
- Nature reserves: 1,3%

Especially important avifauna regions are found near Borken (Hessen), where the Tagebau Gombeth is a breeding area of national significance. Other areas of national importance are:

- Singliser See - breeding and wintering area
- Borkener See - wintering area
- along the River Fulda - breeding and wintering areas
- the "Wasenberg-Ziegenhain Plain" near Schwalmstadt - breeding and wintering area.

Of regional significance is the Ems river, a breeding and wintering area.

The Borkener See nature reserve (332 ha) is also a Special Area of Conservation.

== See also ==
- Natural regions of Germany
- West Hesse Highlands
- East Hesse Highlands

== Sources ==
- Walter Heinemeyer, ed. (1986), "Das Werden Hessens", Veröffentlichungen der Historischen Kommission für Hessen (in German), vol. Band 50 (1. ed.), Marburg: N.G. Elwert Verlag, ISBN 3-7708-0849-5
