= Hesse Highlands =

The Hesse Highlands (German: Hessisches Bergland), Hessian Highlands or Hessian Highlands and Lowlands (Hessisches Berg- und Senkenland), are a largely densely forested low mountain area in the German state of Hesse that lies between the Rhenish Massif and the western edge of the Thuringian Basin. The Hesse Highlands are both part of the German Central Uplands and the Rhine-Weser Watershed.

The Hessian Highlands correspond to the geological structural unit known as the Hessian Depression (Hessischen Senke) in its broader sense, because here geologically young layers of Zechstein and Bunter sandstone, and in places even younger rocks like Muschelkalk, of the Jurassic, Paleogene and Neogene periods, have been preserved.

The Hessian Highlands are divided from a natural regional perspective into the West Hesse Highlands (Westhessisches Bergland) or West Hessian Lowlands and Highlands (Westhessische Berg- und Senkenland, major unit group 34) and the volcanically influenced East Hesse Highlands (Osthessische Bergland, major unit group 35), that are separated by the West Hesse Depression (which itself belongs to the former). Whilst the West Hesse Highlands Lowlands lie entirely on Hessian soil, the East Hesse Highlands have foothills extending into the states of Lower Saxony, Bavaria and Thuringia.

== See also ==
- West Hesse Highlands
- East Hesse Highlands

== Literature ==
- Frank Schmidt-Döhl: Das Hessische Bergland - Die Entstehung einer Landschaft, Shaker Media, Aachen 2012, ISBN 978-3-86858-891-0.
