= Eifa =

River in Germany

Eifa Eifabach
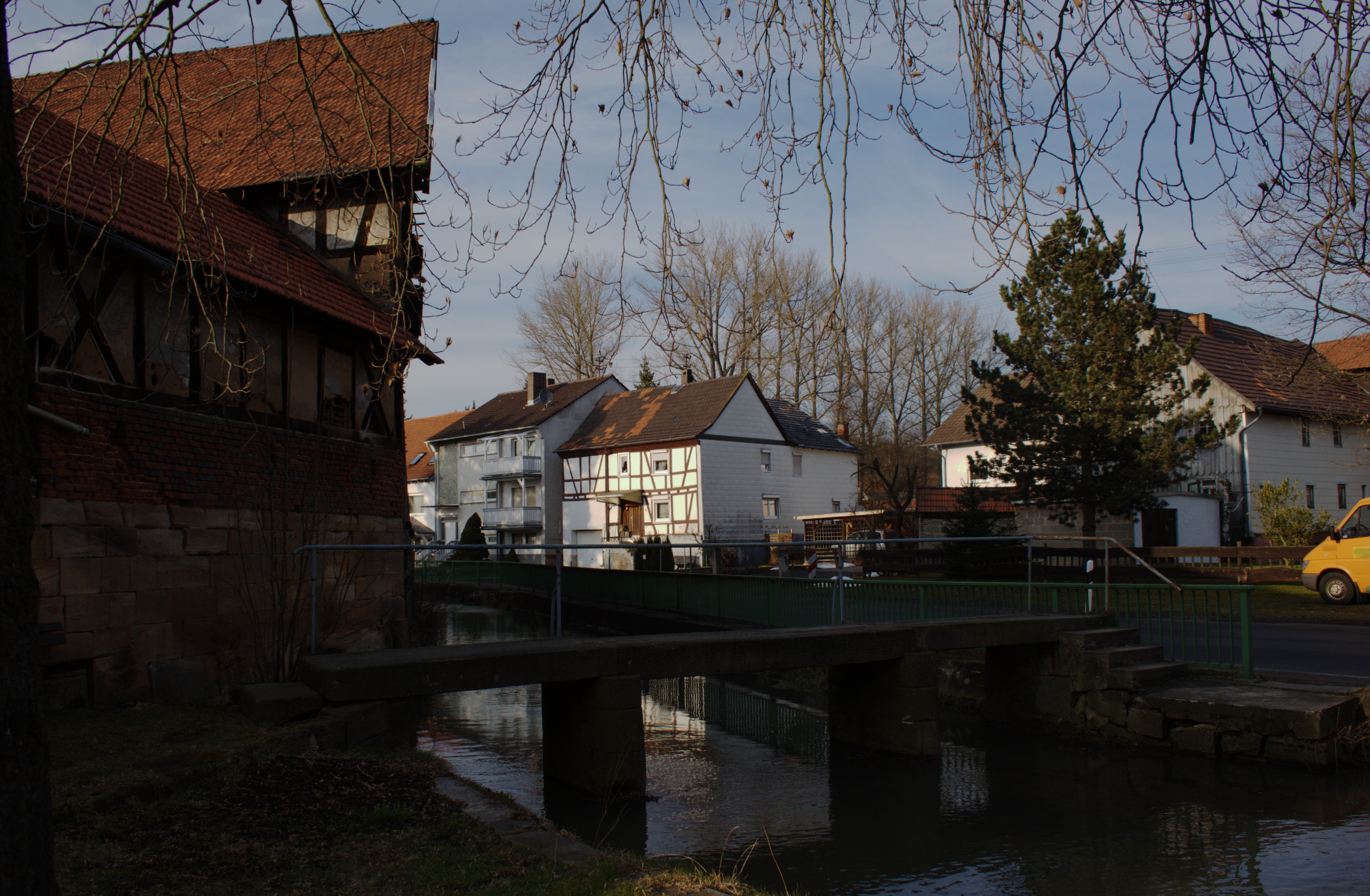
- Footbridge crossing the river in the village of Eifa

Location
- Country: Germany
- State: Hesse
- Kreis: Vogelsbergkreis

Physical characteristics
- Source: Eifaquelle
  - coordinates: 50.71521°N 9.36687°E
- Mouth
  - location: Schwalm
  - coordinates: 50.75704°N 9.28463°E
- Length: 11.0 km (6.8 mi)

Basin features
- Progression: Schwalm→ Eder→ Fulda→ Weser→ North Sea

The Eifa, also called Eifabach, is a tributary of the Schwalm in the East Hesse Highlands in Central Hesse's Vogelsberg district and is part of the river system and catchment area of the Weser.

== Hydrography ==
The Eifa starts in the Ottrauer Bergland, part of the Fulda-Haune Table Country in the East Hesse Highlands, between Knüllgebirge in the northeast and Vogelsberg in the southwest. Its source is about 4 km southeast of the Alsfeld village of Eifa in the valley between the Auerberg in the east, the Kohlhaupt in the south and the Brunkelsberg in the west at about altitude.

Initially, the Eifa, which mainly runs north-west, flows north through the Ottrauer Bergland, passing below the former Niederaula–Alsfeld railway line a below its source, and then running along its route and crossing it again to and through Eifa. In the village, where it is bridged by the federal highway 62, it bends to the west. After the next bridge of the former railway line and also after crossing the Autobahn 5, it passes the Höllhof.

Finally, the river flows east of the Alsfeld core town into the Eder tributary Schwalm, which comes from the south.

== See also ==
- List of rivers of Hesse
