= Ocherbach =

River in Germany

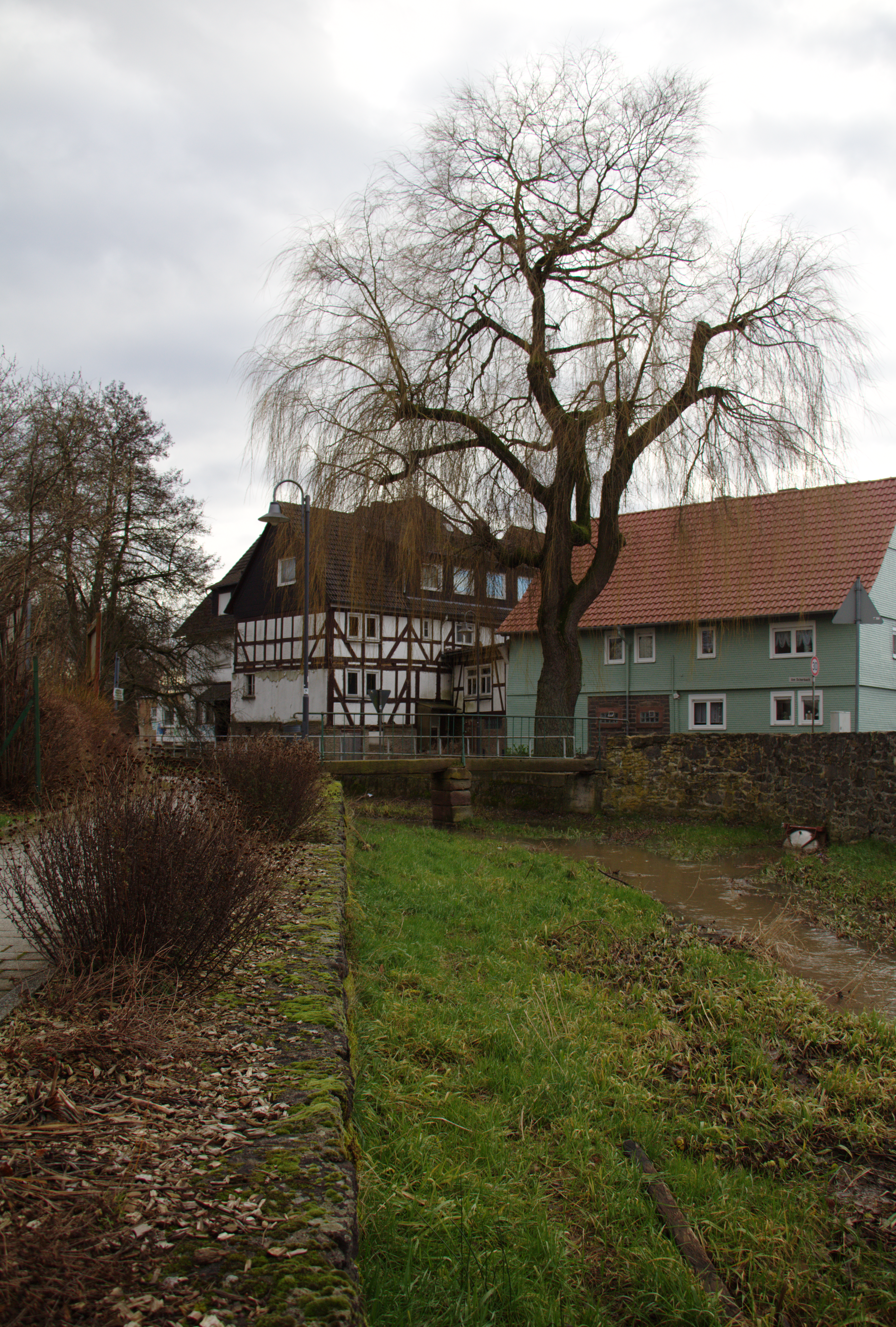

Location
- Country: Germany
- States: Hesse

Physical characteristics
- Mouth
  - location: Antrift
  - coordinates: 50.7061°N 9.2217°E

Basin features
- Progression: Antrift→ Schwalm→ Eder→ Fulda→ Weser→ North Sea

Ocherbach is a small river of Hesse, Germany. It flows into the Antrift in Romrod.

== See also ==
- List of rivers of Hesse
