= Schwalm (region) =

German region in West Hesse

The Schwalm (German pronunciation: [ʃvalm]) is a natural region or landscape unit within the West Hesse Depression and also the smallest basin within it. It is named after the River Schwalm, on whose middle reaches it lies. In the east the Schwalm region is bounded by the Knüll hills, in the south by the northern foothills of the Vogelsberg and, in the west, by the Gilserberg Heights. In the north the Schwalm transitions into the Landsburg Basin.

The natural region sub-unit of the Schwalm has the following sub-sub-units:

Sub-units of the Schwalm natural region
| Number | Natural region | Area km^{2} | Topographic map |
|---|---|---|---|
| 343.0 | Schwalm | | |
| 343.00 | Schwalmgrund | 17,83 | TK25 No. 5121 |
| 343.01 | Wasenberg Terraces | 75,75 | TK25 No. 5121 |
| 343.02 | Alsfeld Bowl | 61,71 | TK25 No. 5221 |

In local usage the landscape name "Schwalm" usually just refers to the northern part, i.e. the Wasenberg Terraces and the Schwalmgrund.

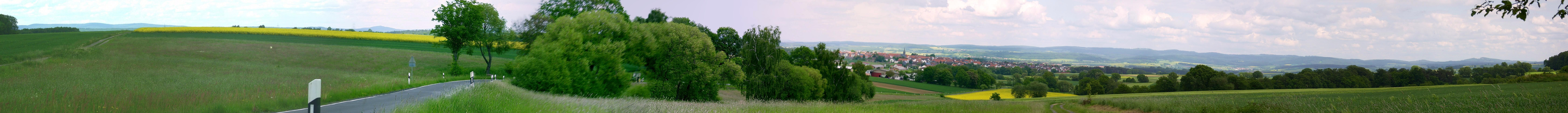
View from the west of the Wasenberg, the Wasenberg Terraces and the Knüll with the Knüllköpfchen (634 m, wind power station) and the Kirschenwald (up to 533 m, right);
Left: the wooded top of the Altenburg (433 m) near Bad Zwesten, which separates to the left the valley of the Schwalm from the Kellerwald (far left the 675-metre-high Wüstegarten)
