= Waldecker =

Waldecker may refer to something from the Principality of Waldeck and Pyrmont or Waldeck Plateau, or a notable German so surnamed:

- Burkhart Waldecker (1902–1964), German explorer
- Rebecca Waldecker (born 1979), German mathematician
