= Warme (disambiguation) =

The Warme is a river in Hesse.

Warme may refer to:

- Kara Warme, American politician
- Warme Bode, tributary of the Bode
- Warme Riss, small river in Baden-Württemberg
- Warme Steinach, small river in Bavaria

== See also ==
- War (disambiguation)
