= Lembach (disambiguation) =

Lembach may refer to:

- Lembach, a commune in Bas-Rhin, northeastern France
- Lembach im Mühlkreis, a municipality in Upper Austria, northern Austria
- Lembach (Schwalm), a river in Hesse, Germany
