= Hessian Central Uplands =

The Hessian Central Uplands are an area of volcanic highland in Central Hesse in Germany. It is also referred to as the Vogelsberg-Meissner Axis.

The Hessian Central Uplands include the Vogelsberg mountain range, the largest contiguous region of basalt in Europe, as well as numerous volcanic outcrops, large and small, within the state of Hesse. The uplands are bounded to the west and east by the West and East Hesse Depressions respectively, two major natural corridors running roughly north-to-south through the state. Further north, the uplands encompass the smaller Knüll and Meissner (range) ranges.

Within Germany's current natural regional classification system, the Hessian Central Uplands fall within the natural region of the East Hesse Highlands which also includes the East Hesse Depression as well as the Rhön.
