= Nebelbeeke =

River in Germany

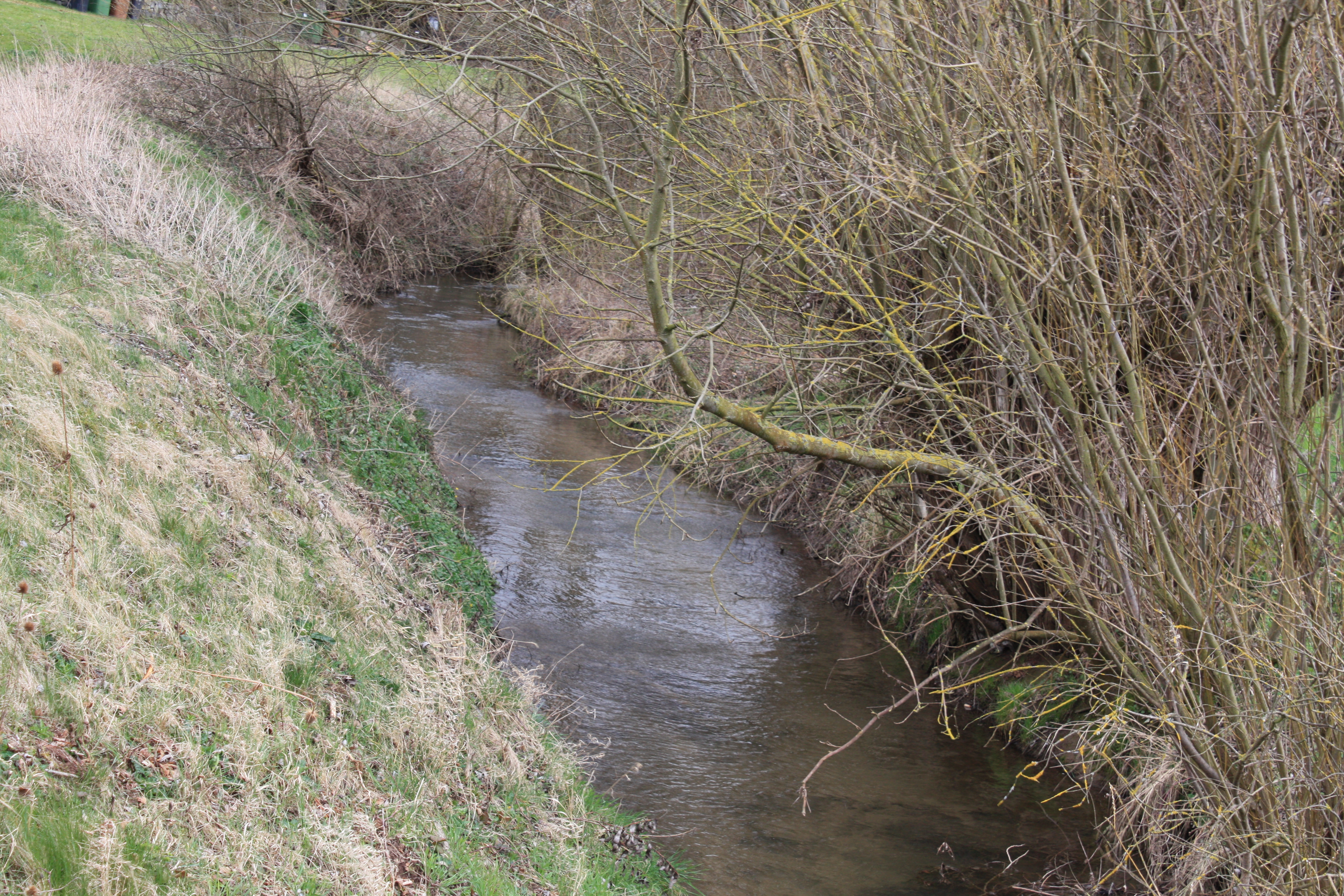

Location
- Country: Germany
- State: Hesse

Physical characteristics
- Mouth
  - location: Warme
  - coordinates: 51.4427°N 9.3067°E
- Length: 10.9 km (6.8 mi)

Basin features
- Progression: Warme→ Diemel→ Weser→ North Sea

Nebelbeeke is a river of Hesse, Germany. It flows into the Warme in Obermeiser.

== See also ==
- List of rivers of Hesse
