= Berfa =

River in Germany

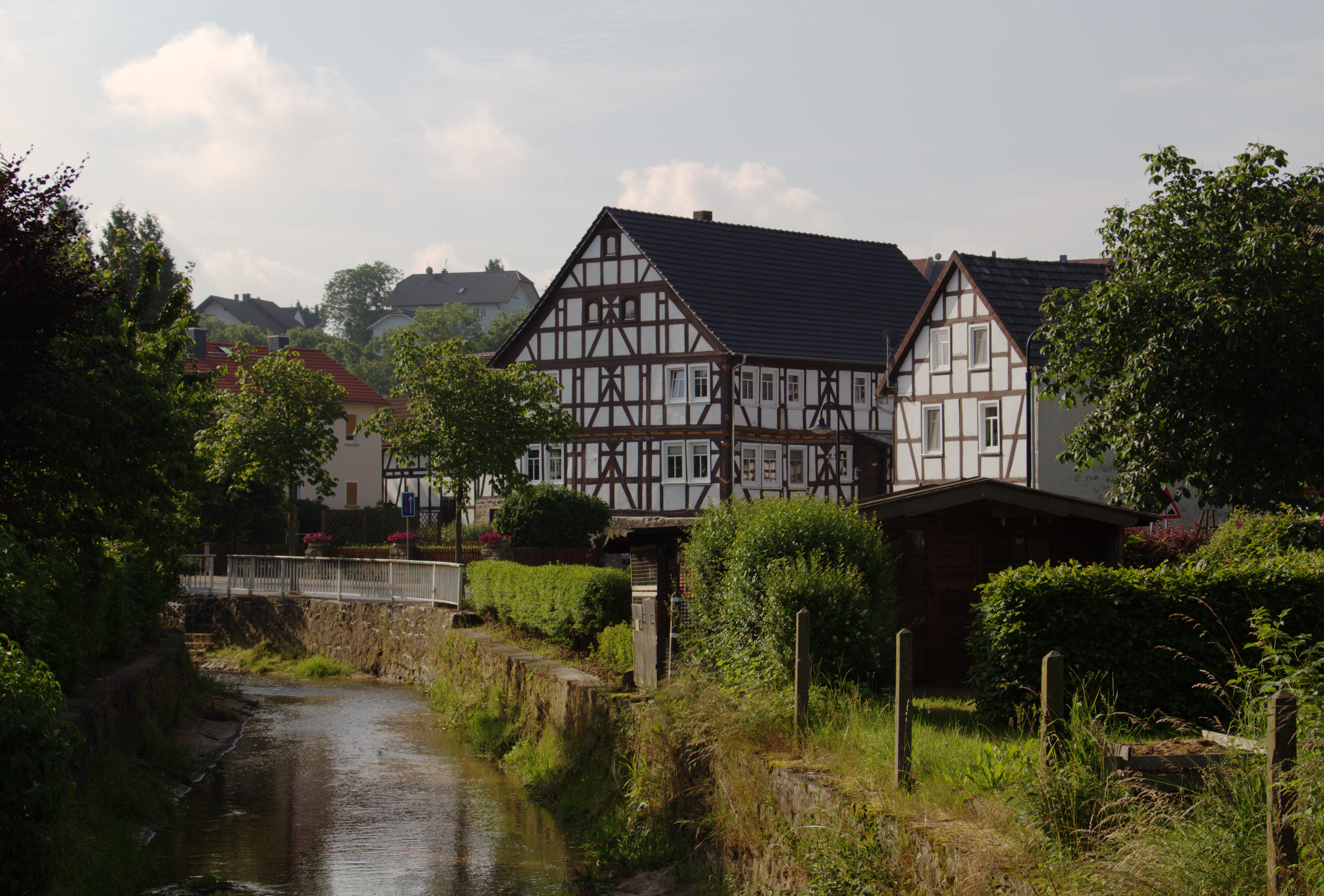

Location
- Country: Germany
- State: Hesse

Physical characteristics
- Mouth
  - location: Schwalm
  - coordinates: 50.8166°N 9.2675°E
- Length: 20 km (12 mi)

Basin features
- Progression: Schwalm→ Eder→ Fulda→ Weser→ North Sea

The Berfa (in its upper course: Schwarzwasser) is a river of Hesse, Germany. The 20-km long Berfa flows into the Schwalm near Schrecksbach.

== See also ==
- List of rivers of Hesse
