= Lembach (Schwalm) =

River in Germany

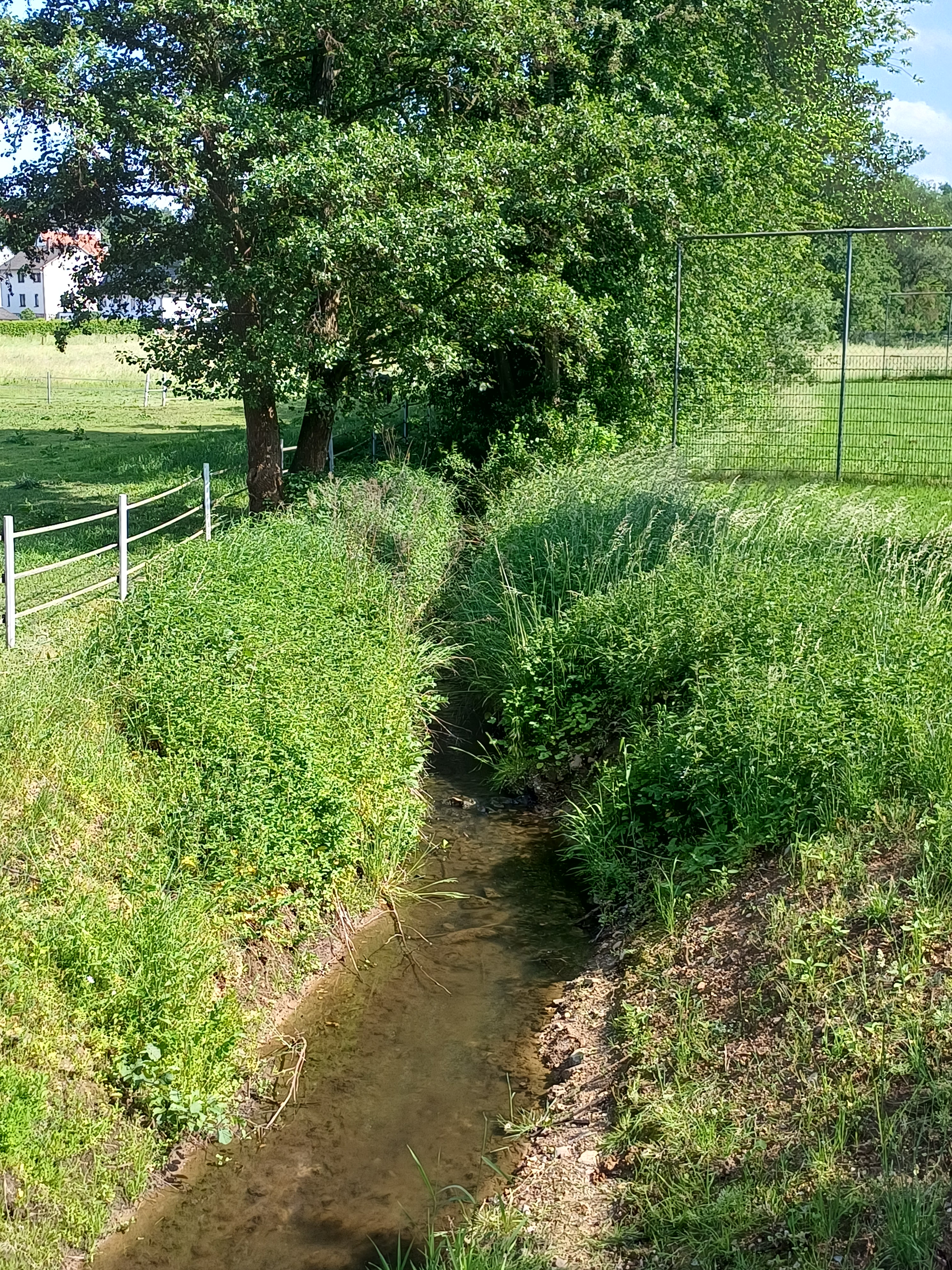

Location
- Country: Germany
- States: Hesse

Physical characteristics
- Mouth
  - location: Schwalm
  - coordinates: 51.0718°N 9.3366°E

Basin features
- Progression: Schwalm→ Eder→ Fulda→ Weser→ North Sea

Lembach is a small river of Hesse, Germany. It flows into the Schwalm river near Wabern.

== See also ==
- List of rivers of Hesse
