= Antrift =

River in Germany

- Location of mouth in Hesse

Location
- Country: Germany
- State: Hesse

Physical characteristics
- Mouth
  - location: Schwalm
  - coordinates: 50.8752°N 9.2564°E
- Length: 38.6 km (24.0 mi)
- Basin size: 115 km^{2} (44 sq mi)

Basin features
- Progression: Schwalm→ Eder→ Fulda→ Weser→ North Sea

Antrift (German pronunciation: [ˈantʁɪft]; in its lower course: Antreff) is a river of Hesse, Germany. It is a tributary of the Schwalm, joining it on the left bank in Zella, a parish of Willingshausen.

== See also ==
- List of rivers of Hesse
