= Nüst =

River in Germany

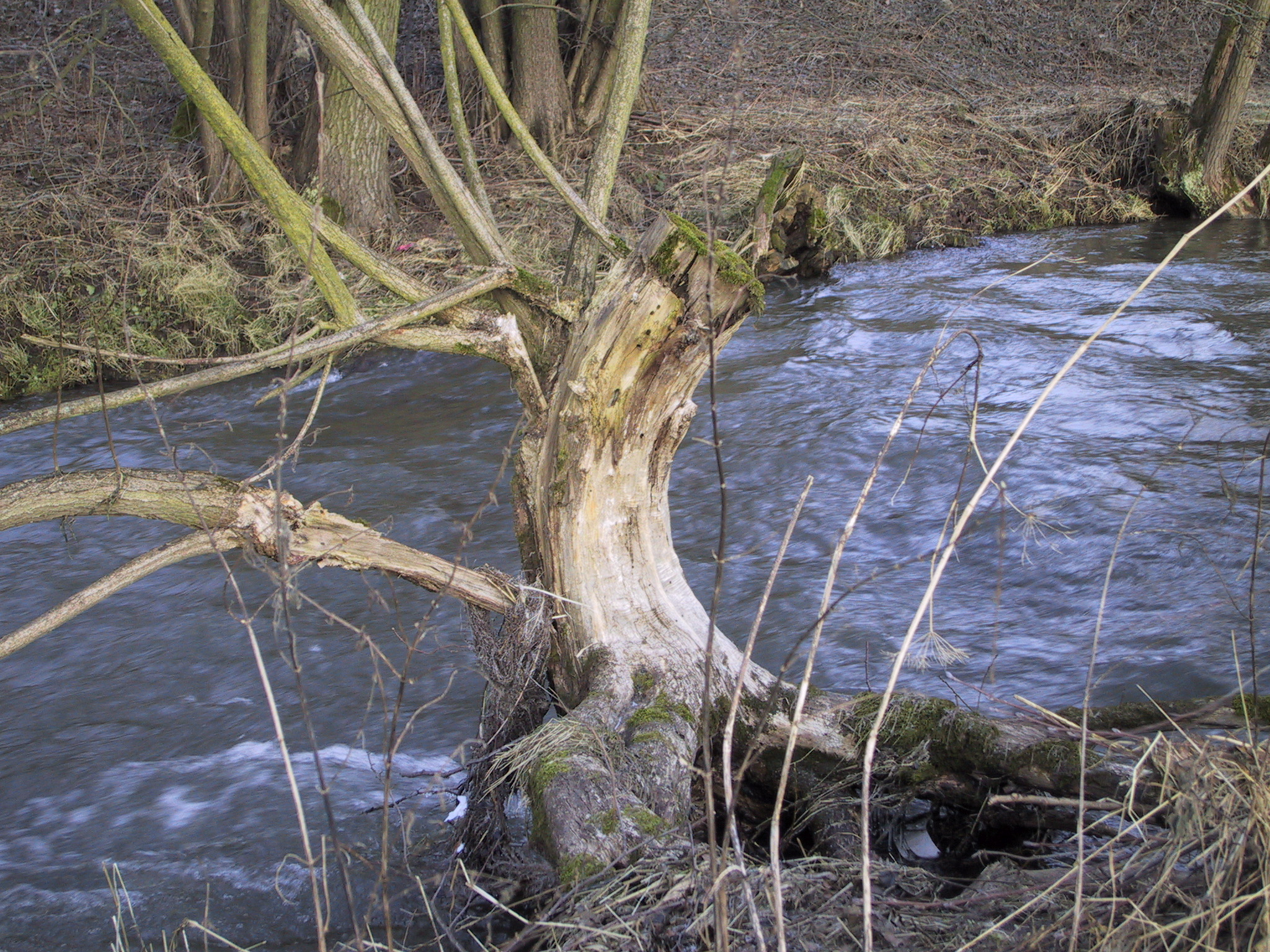

Location
- Country: Germany
- State: Hesse

Physical characteristics
- Mouth
  - location: Haune
  - coordinates: 50.6600°N 9.7556°E
- Length: 22.8 km (14.2 mi)

Basin features
- Progression: Haune→ Fulda→ Weser→ North Sea

Nüst is a river of Hesse, Germany. It flows into the Haune near Hünfeld.

== See also ==
- List of rivers of Hesse
