= Isthaberg =

Coordinates: 51°19′08″N 9°13′13″E

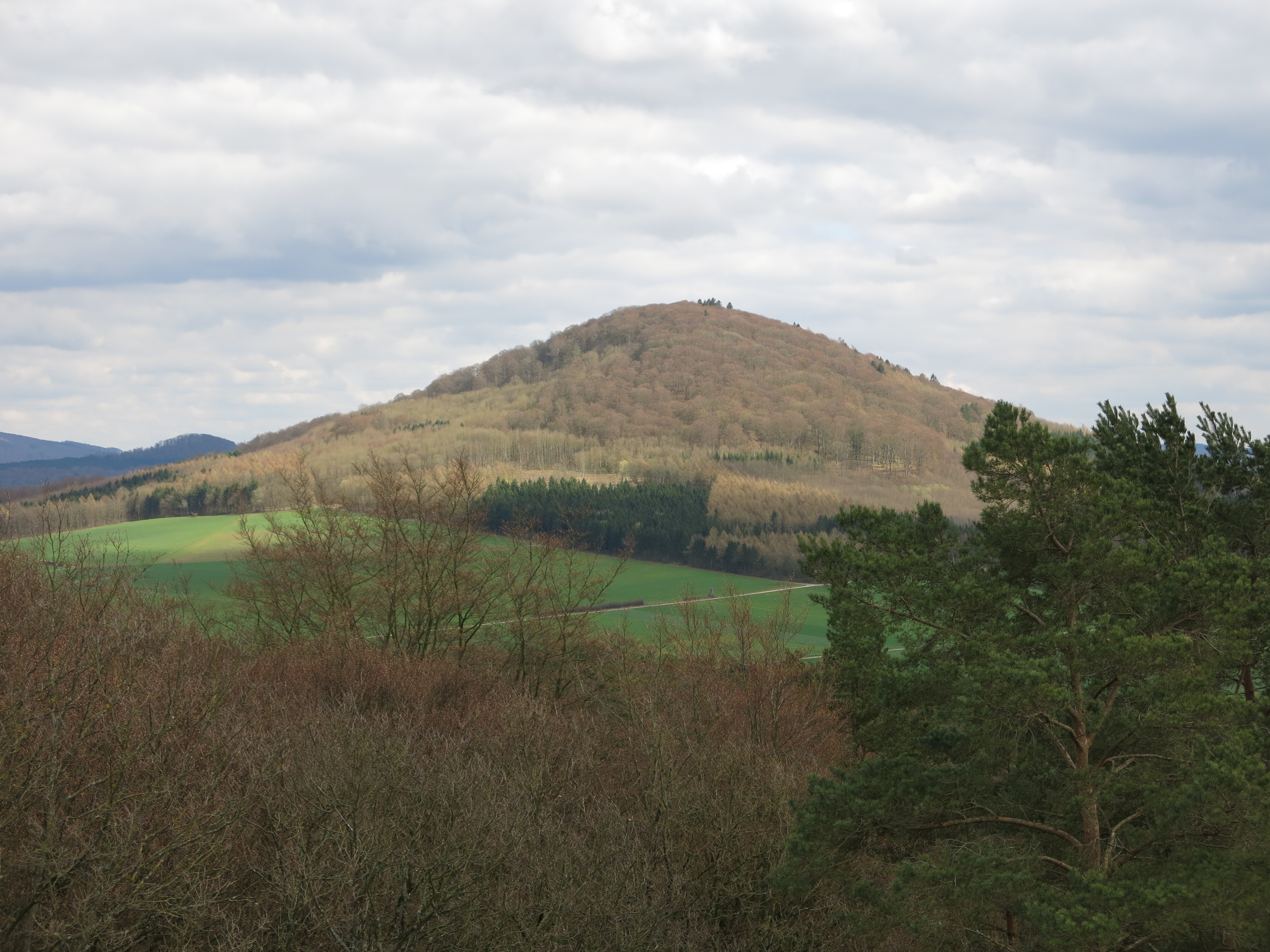

Highest point
- Elevation: 523.1 m (1,716 ft)

Geography
- Location: Hesse, Germany

Isthaberg is a hill of Hesse, Germany. Its altitude is 523m (1715 ft).
