= Niederwaldsee =

Lake in Germany

- Location within Hesse
- Location: Bensheim, Bergstraße, Hesse
- Coordinates: 49.715927°N 8.590753°E
- Basin countries: Germany
- Surface area: 6 ha (15 acres)

Niederwaldsee Bensheim

The Niederwaldsee is a lake in Bensheim. Bensheim is a town in the Bergstraße district in southern Hesse, Germany.
