= Eisenberg (Knüll) =

Mountain in Germany

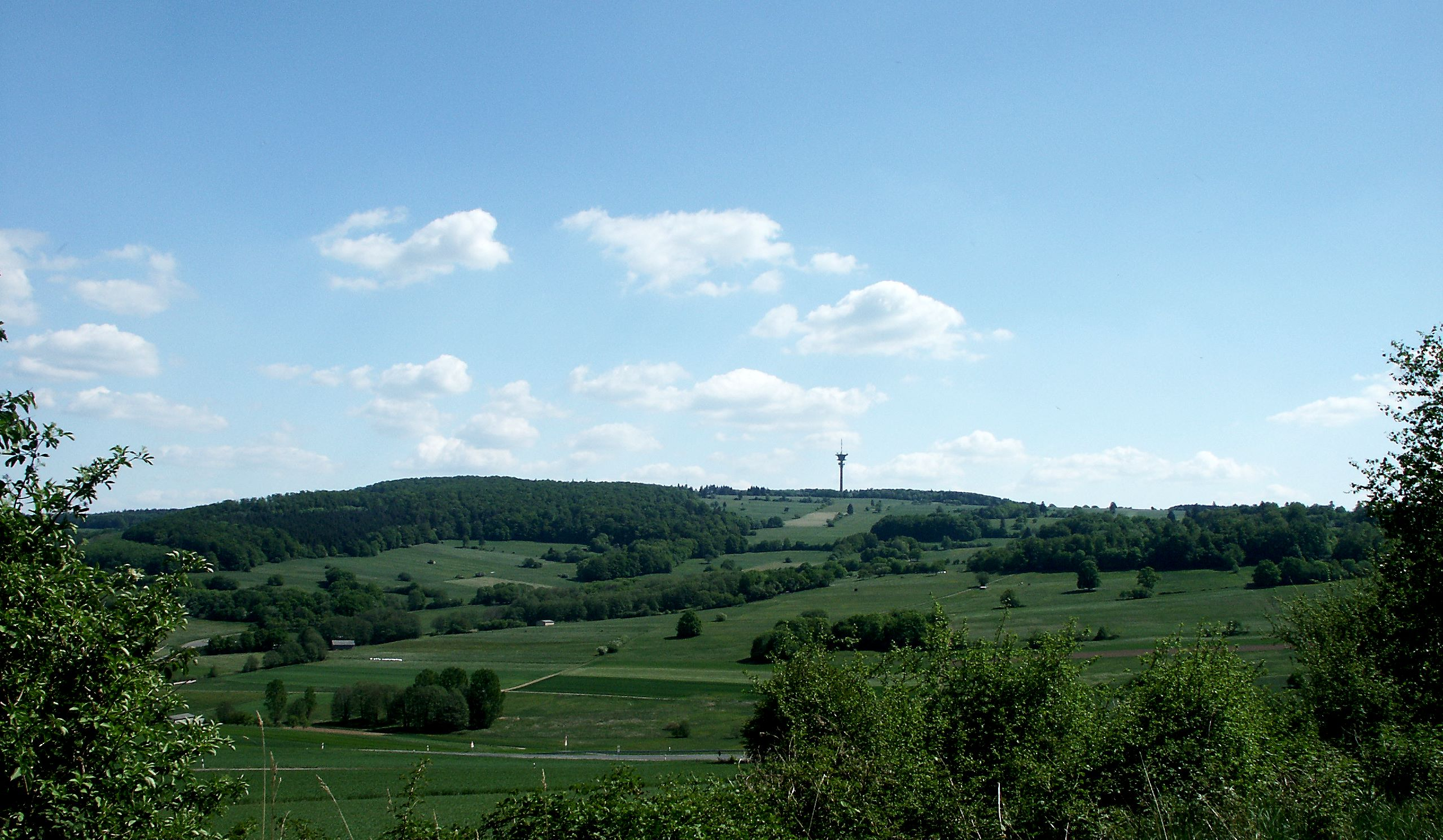

Highest point
- Elevation: 635.5 m (2,085 ft)
- Coordinates: 50°53′14″N 9°31′3″E

Geography
- Location: Hesse, Germany

The Eisenberg (German pronunciation: [ˈaɪzn̩bɛʁk]) is a mountain in the Knüllgebirge (Knüll) in Hesse, Germany.
