= Weid (Ulster) =

River in Germany

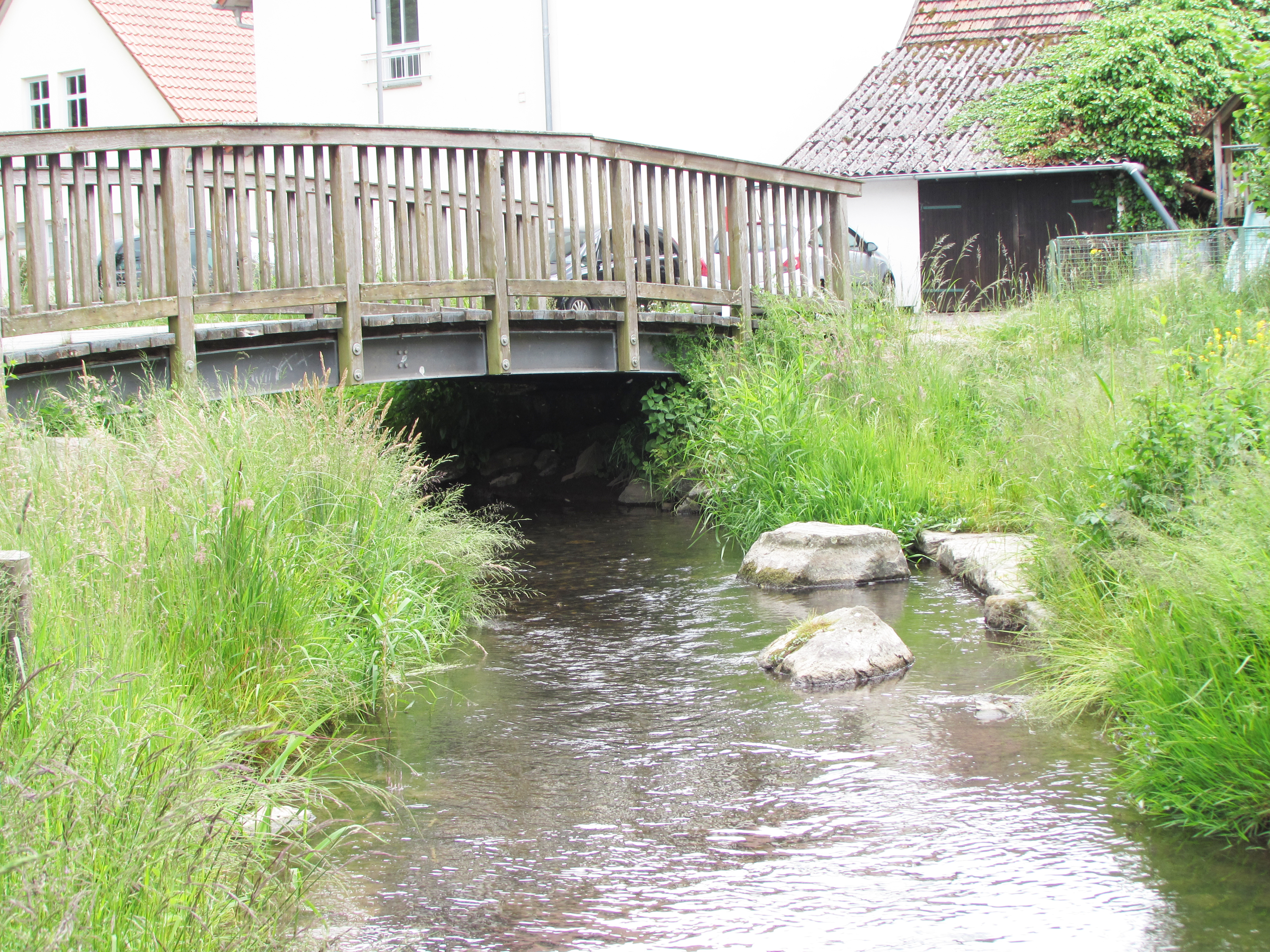

Location
- Country: Germany
- States: Hesse and Thuringia

Physical characteristics
- Mouth
  - location: Ulster
  - coordinates: 50.6324°N 10.0152°E

Basin features
- Progression: Ulster→ Werra→ Weser→ North Sea

Weid (German pronunciation: [vaɪt]) is a river of Hesse and Thuringia, Germany. It flows into the Ulster river near Tann. Weid is a very short river being about 1.7 miles (2.73 km) long. The headwaters of weid are formed when the Weidbach and the Mühlbach combine.

== See also ==
- List of rivers of Hesse
- List of rivers of Thuringia
