= Gombether See =

Lake in Hesse, Germany

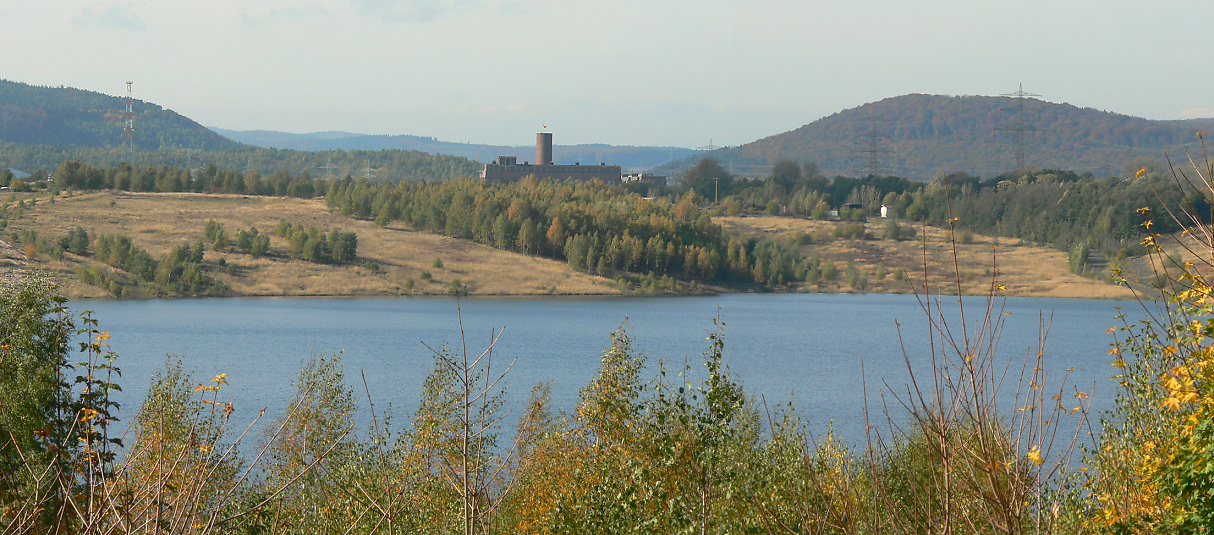

- Location within Hesse
- Location: Westhessische Senke, Hesse
- Coordinates: 51.059631°N 9.285768°E
- Catchment area: 1.2 km^{2} (0.46 sq mi)
- Basin countries: Germany
- Surface area: 30 ha (74 acres)
- Max. depth: 50 m (160 ft)
- Surface elevation: 177 m (581 ft)

Gombether See is a lake in Westhessische Senke, Hesse, Germany. At an elevation of 177 m, its surface area is 30 ha.
