= Jossa (Fulda) =

River in Germany

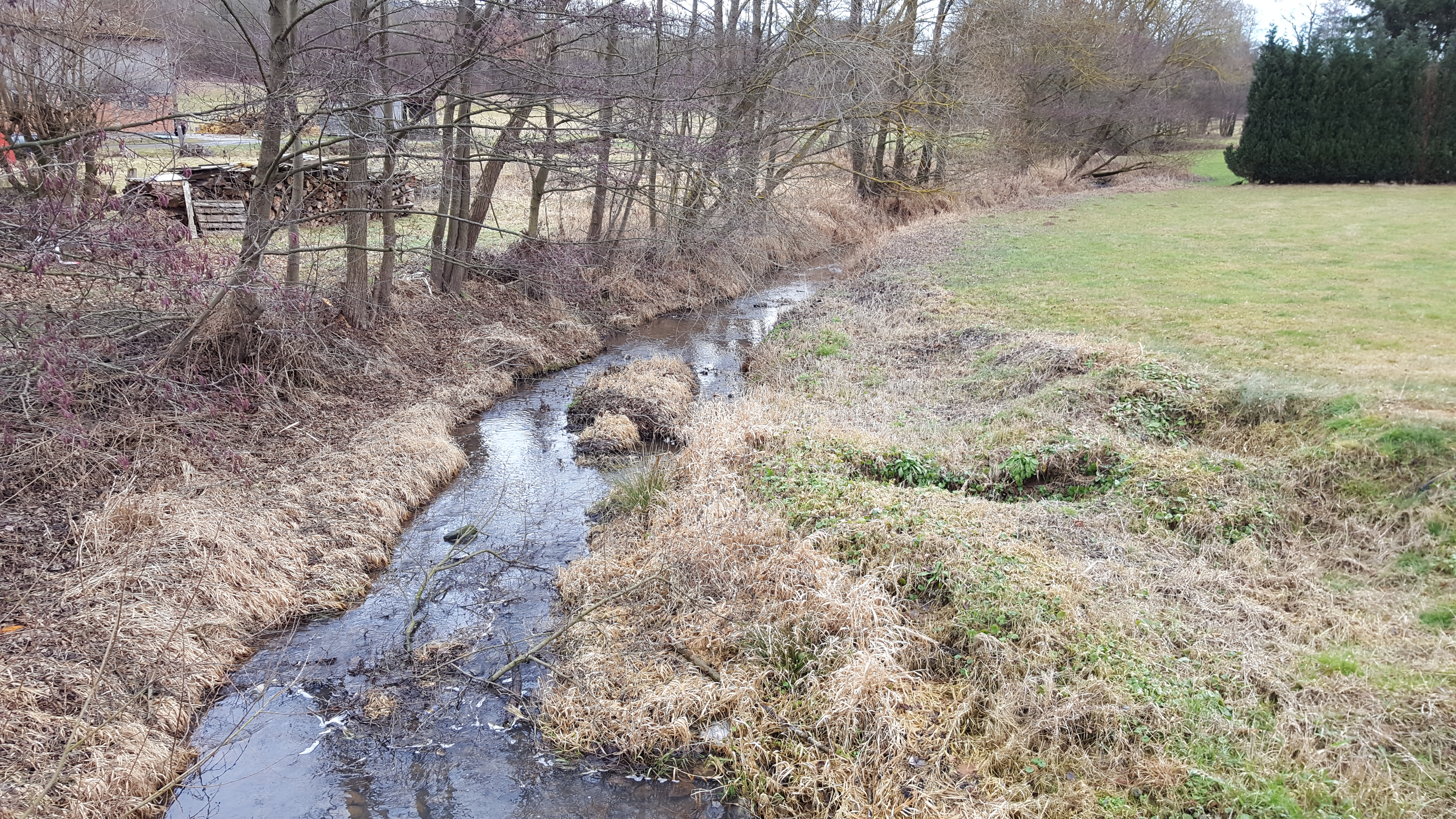
- The Jossa at Oberjossa, Breitenbach am Herzberg

Location
- Country: Germany
- State: Hesse

Physical characteristics
- Mouth
  - location: Fulda
  - coordinates: 50.7712°N 9.5834°E
- Length: 22.8 km (14.2 mi)

Basin features
- Progression: Fulda→ Weser→ North Sea

Jossa is a river of Hesse, Germany. It flows into the Fulda near Niederaula.

== See also ==
- List of rivers of Hesse
