= Seeweiher =

Lake in Hesse, Germany

Seeweiher (Mengerskirchen)
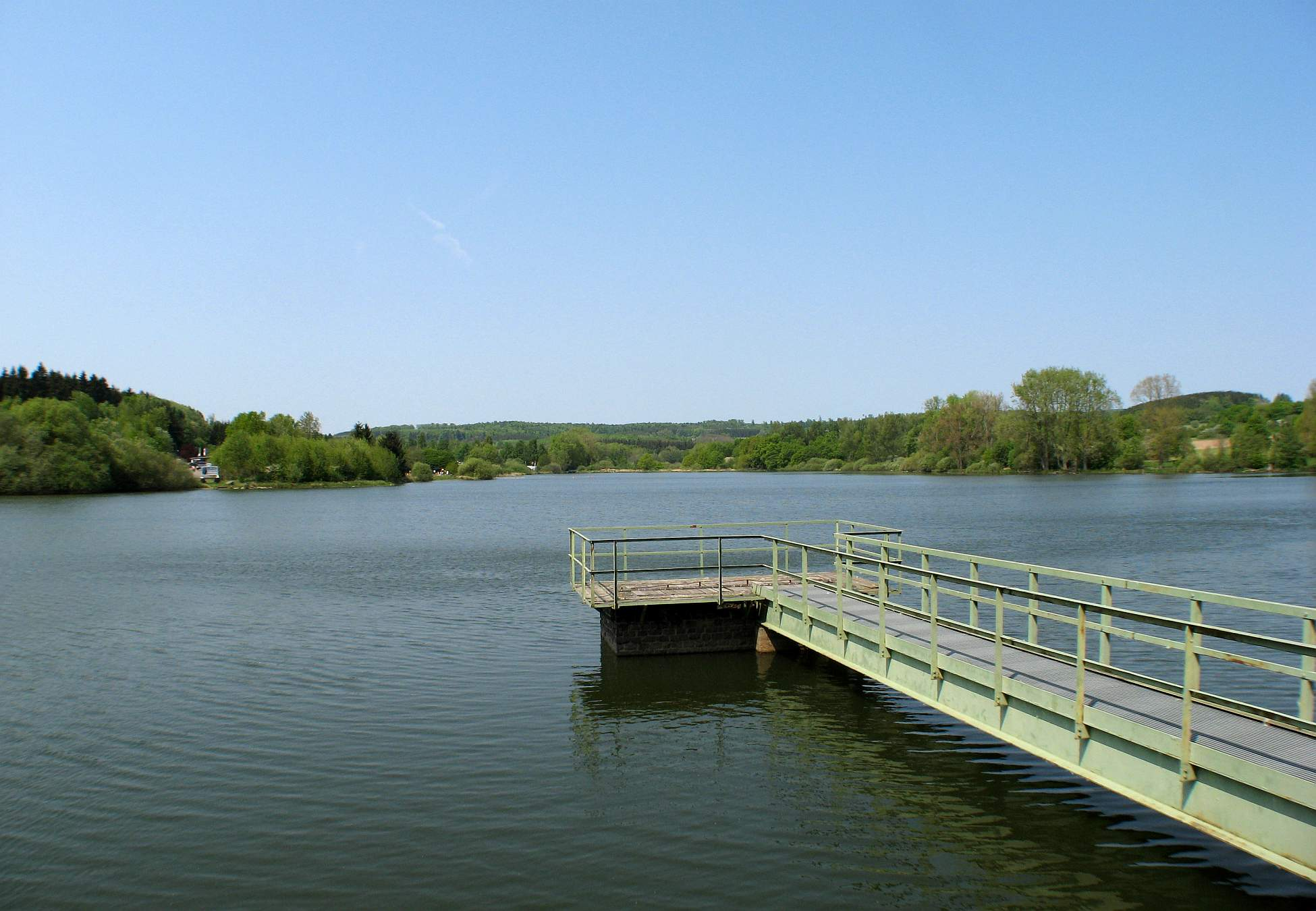
- View over the Seeweiher

- Location within Germany
- Location: Hesse
- Coordinates: 50°32′53″N 8°08′58″E
- Max. length: 0.939 kilometres (0.583 mi)
- Surface area: 0.13 kilometres (0.081 mi)

The Seeweiher is a reservoir north of the village of Waldernbach in the municipality of Mengerskirchen (county of Limburg-Weilburg) in the Westerwald in the German state of Hesse. It impounds the Vöhlerbach, a tributary of the Kallenbach which, in turn, flows into the River Lahn. It has a surface area of 13 hectares.

The Seeweiher was impounded in 1452 and is thus one of the oldest reservoirs in Hesse.

== Leisure facilities ==
There was a campsite on the shores of the bathing lake and, since 1978, there has been a weekend village with 66 houses. Once a year the Westerwald Water Working Group holds a water work assessment for Newfoundland and Landseer dogs on land owned by the DLRG by the Seeweiher.
