= Waldeck Plateau =

The Waldeck Plateau (German: Waldecker Tafel or Waldecker Tafelland) is a natural 'upper main unit' in the German state of Hesse between the rivers Eder and Diemel, the East Sauerland Hills in the west and the East Waldeck Basin in the east.

The unit and term Waldecker Tafel ("Waldeck Table") was coined in the 1950s because the decimal system of natural main units and their groups in the West Hesse Highlands (main unit group 34) had not proved sufficient, because this group had more than 11 clearly separate main units. Under the serial number 340 were included the open high plateaus made of Zechstein and Bunter sandstone of the Waldeck Plain (340_{1}) and the adjacent thickly wooded Bunter sandstone ridge of the Waldeck Forest (340_{2}). Both landscape units are considered as independent main units.

== Natural regions ==
The Waldeck Plateau is divided into natural regions as follows:

- 340 Waldeck Plateau (Waldecker Tafel)
  - 340_{1} Waldeck Plain (Waldecker Gefilde)
    - 340_{1}.0 The Red Country (Das Rote Land)
      - 340_{1}.00 Upper Marsberg Plateau (Obermarsberger Hochfläche)
      - 340_{1}.01 Rotenlandsgrund
    - 340_{1}.1 Korbacher Land
      - 340_{1}.10 Berndorfer Grund
      - 340_{1}.11 Korbach Plain (Korbacher Ebene)
      - 340_{1}.12 Goddelsheimer Feld
      - 340_{1}.13 Sachsenhausen Hills (Sachsenhäuser Hügelland)
  - 340_{2} Waldeck Forest (Waldecker Wald)
    - 340_{2}.0 Orpewald
    - 340_{2}.1 Twiste Hills (Twister Hügelland)
    - 340_{2}.2 Arolsen Plateau (Arolser Platte)
    - 340_{2}.3 Langer Wald
    - 340_{2}.4 Alter Wald

The Hessian Environmental Atlas (Umweltatlas Hessen) of the State Environment Ministry simplifies the numbering, by substituting a 0 in the first decimal place for the Waldeck Plain instead of the subscript 1, and a 2 in the decimal placed for the Waldeck Forest instead of the subscript 2. Thus the Lange Wald is number 340.13 and the Sachsenhäuser Hügelland is number 340.013. A disadvantage of this format is that it is not clear that it is referring to two different main units.
