= East Hesse Depression =

The East Hesse Depression is one of two fault troughs trending from north-northeast to south-southwest in the state of Hesse, Germany. Like the West Hesse Depression, it is a series of separate depressions that form a natural corridor and have been an important historical trade route.

The corridor follows the valley of the Kinzig passing through Hersfeld, Fulda and Bebra, then continues down the Fulda valley to Kassel and finally runs along the course of the Leine to Göttingen. This trough is bounded to the west by the Vogelsberg-Meißner Axis or Hessian Central Uplands and to the east by the Thuringian Highland and Rhön Mountains.
