= Singliser See =

Lake in Germany

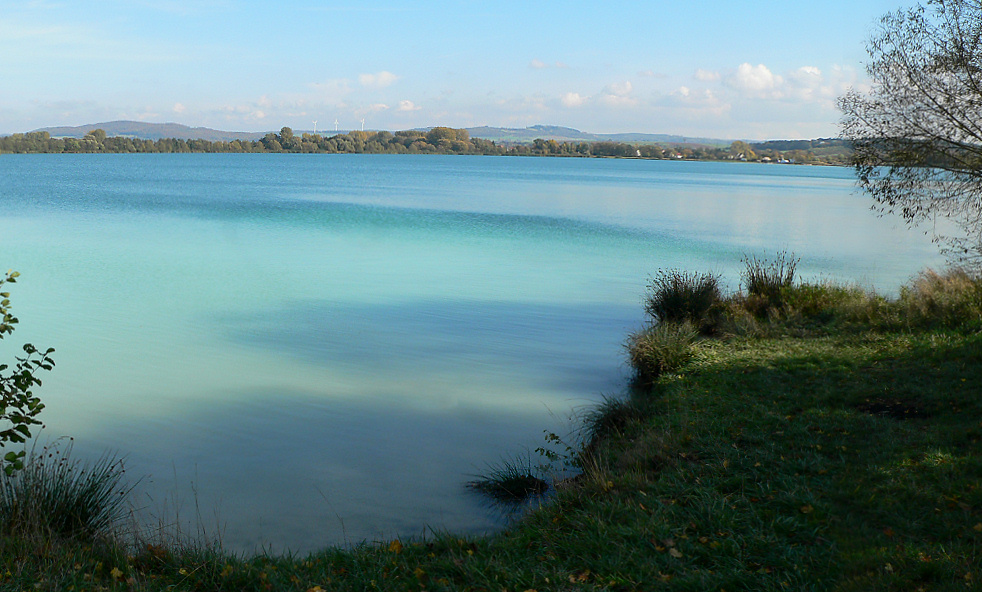

- Location within Hesse
- Location: West Hesse Depression, Hesse
- Coordinates: 51.059691°N 9.305133°E
- Basin countries: Germany
- Max. length: 1.2 km (0.75 mi)
- Max. width: 0.85 km (0.53 mi)
- Surface area: 74 ha (180 acres)
- Surface elevation: 185 m (607 ft)

Singliser See is a lake in West Hesse Depression, Hesse, Germany. At an elevation of 185 m, its surface area is 74 ha.
