= Hessengau =

Hessengau roughly corresponds to regions marked with 343.2

Hessengau (German pronunciation: [ˈhɛsn̩ˌɡaʊ]) is an historical region of modern-day Germany located between Beverungen and Marburg in the north and Bad Hersfeld to the south.
