= Knüllköpfchen =

Mountain in Germany

Coordinates: 50°55′00″N 9°25′20″E

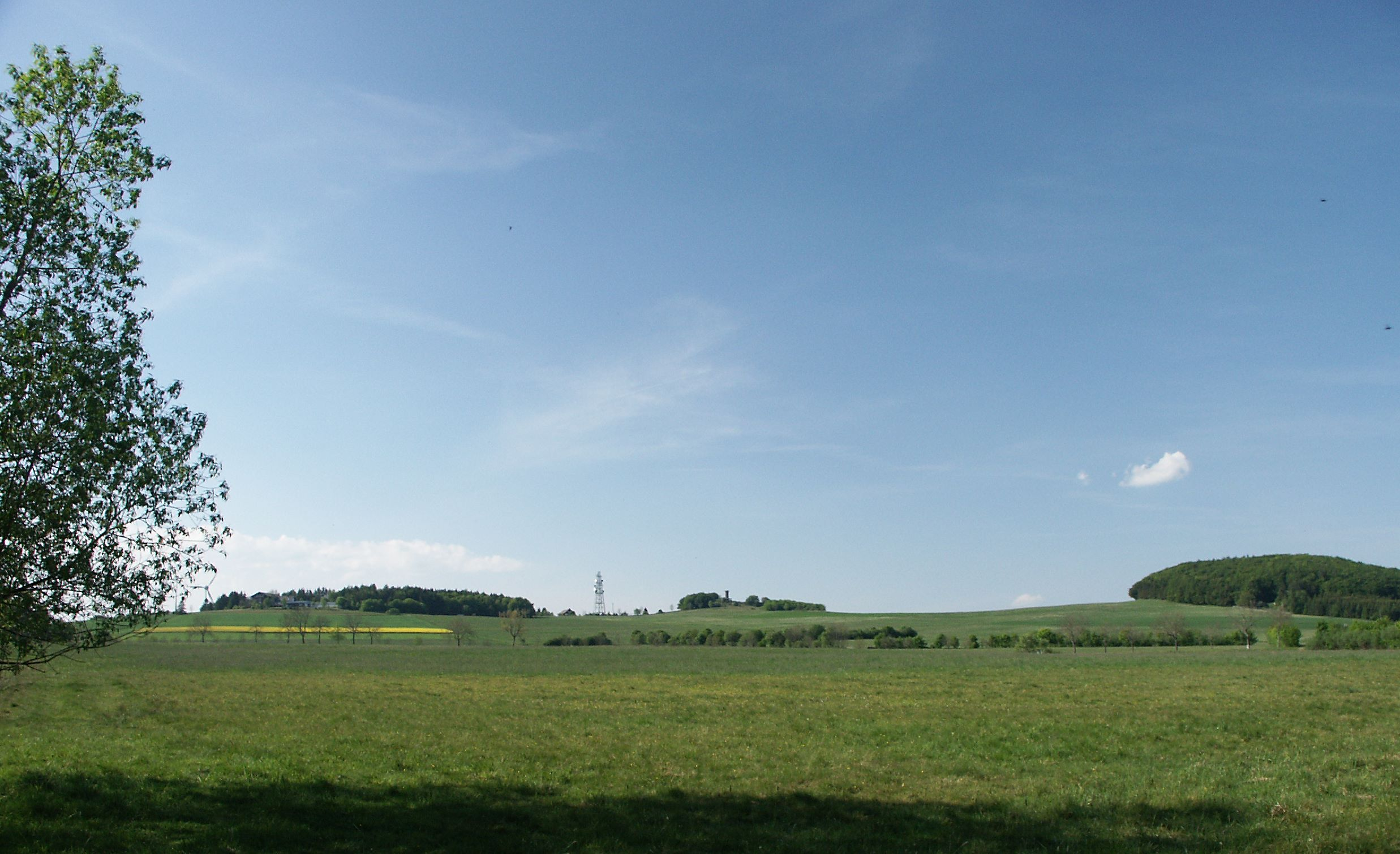
- Knuell knuellkoepfchen

Highest point
- Elevation: 633.8 m (2,079 ft)

Geography
- Location: Schwalm-Eder-Kreis, Hesse, Germany

Knüllköpfchen is a mountain of Schwalm-Eder-Kreis, Hesse, Germany. It is around 634 meters in altitude.
