= Borkener See =

Lake in Hesse, Germany

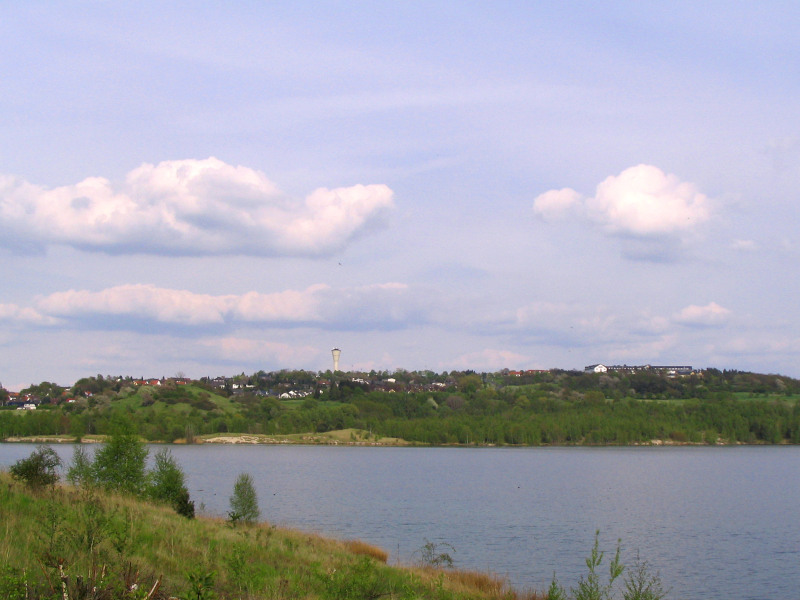

- Location within Hesse
- Location: West Hesse Depression, Hesse
- Coordinates: 51.0347°N 9.2669°E
- Catchment area: 3.5 km^{2} (1.4 sq mi)
- Basin countries: Germany
- Max. length: 1.25 km (0.78 mi)
- Max. width: 0.78 km (0.48 mi)
- Surface area: 139 ha (340 acres)
- Max. depth: 52.5 m (172 ft)
- Water volume: 35,000,000 m^{3} (1.2×10^{9} cu ft)
- Surface elevation: 177 m (581 ft)

Borkener See is an artificial lake in West Hesse Depression, Hesse, Germany. At an elevation of 177 metres (581 ft), its surface area is 139 hectares (340 acres). Created by the mining of lignite coal, the lake is nutrient-poor and slightly basic in pH. The lake and its surrounding area are a habitat of "particular importance as a rest area for water birds and wading birds" and are protected as part of a nature preserve that spans 350 hectares.
