= Warme =

River in Germany

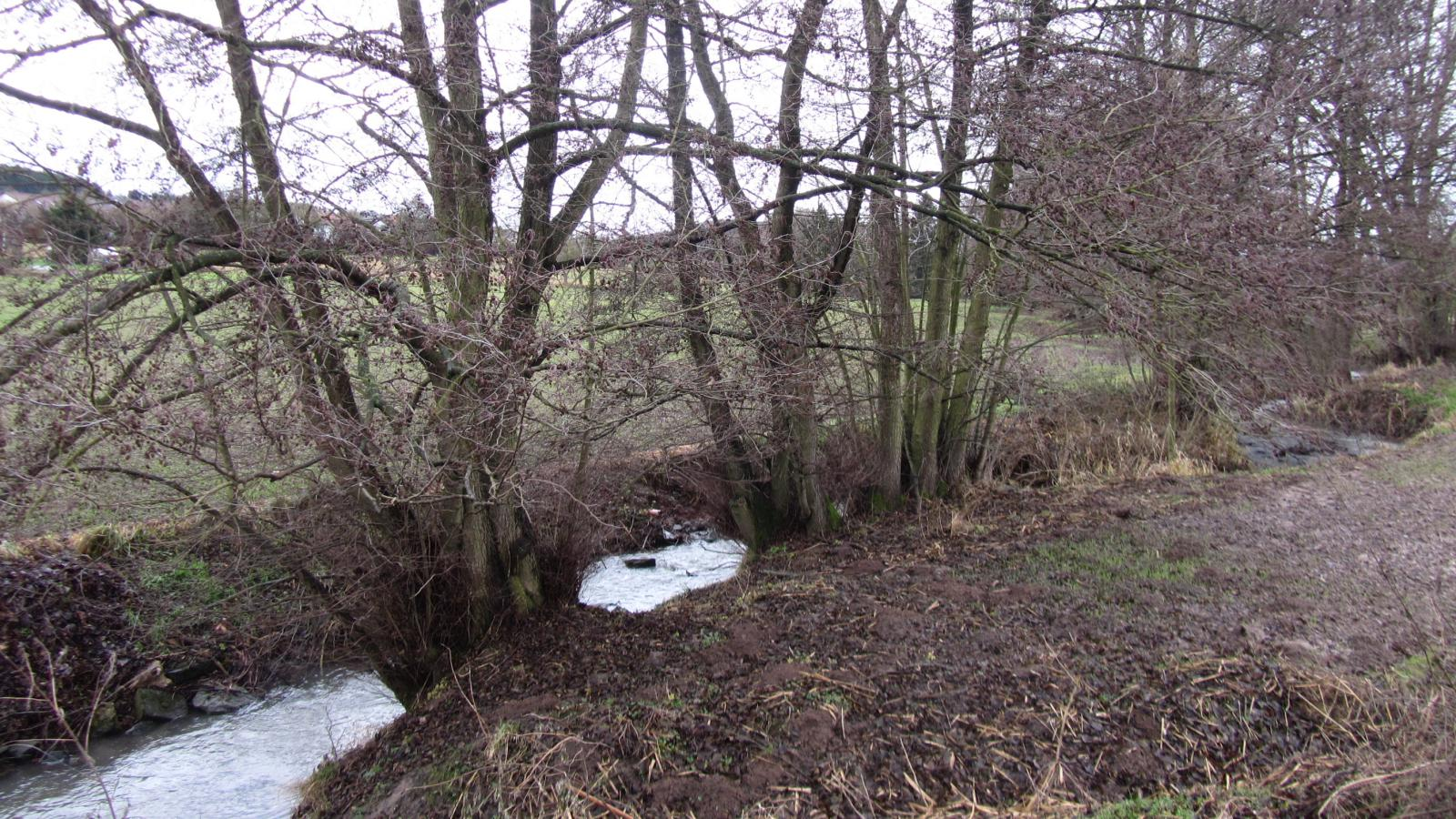

Location
- Country: Germany
- State: Hesse

Physical characteristics
- Mouth
  - location: Diemel
  - coordinates: 51.5053°N 9.2960°E
- Length: 33.1 km (20.6 mi)
- Basin size: 157 km^{2} (61 sq mi)

Basin features
- Progression: Diemel→ Weser→ North Sea

Warme (also: Warmebach) is a river of Hesse, Germany. It is approximately 33.1 km long. It flows into the Diemel near Liebenau.

== See also ==
- List of rivers of Hesse
