= Hoher Meißner =

Mountain in Germany

Coordinates: 51°12′28″N 9°50′50″E

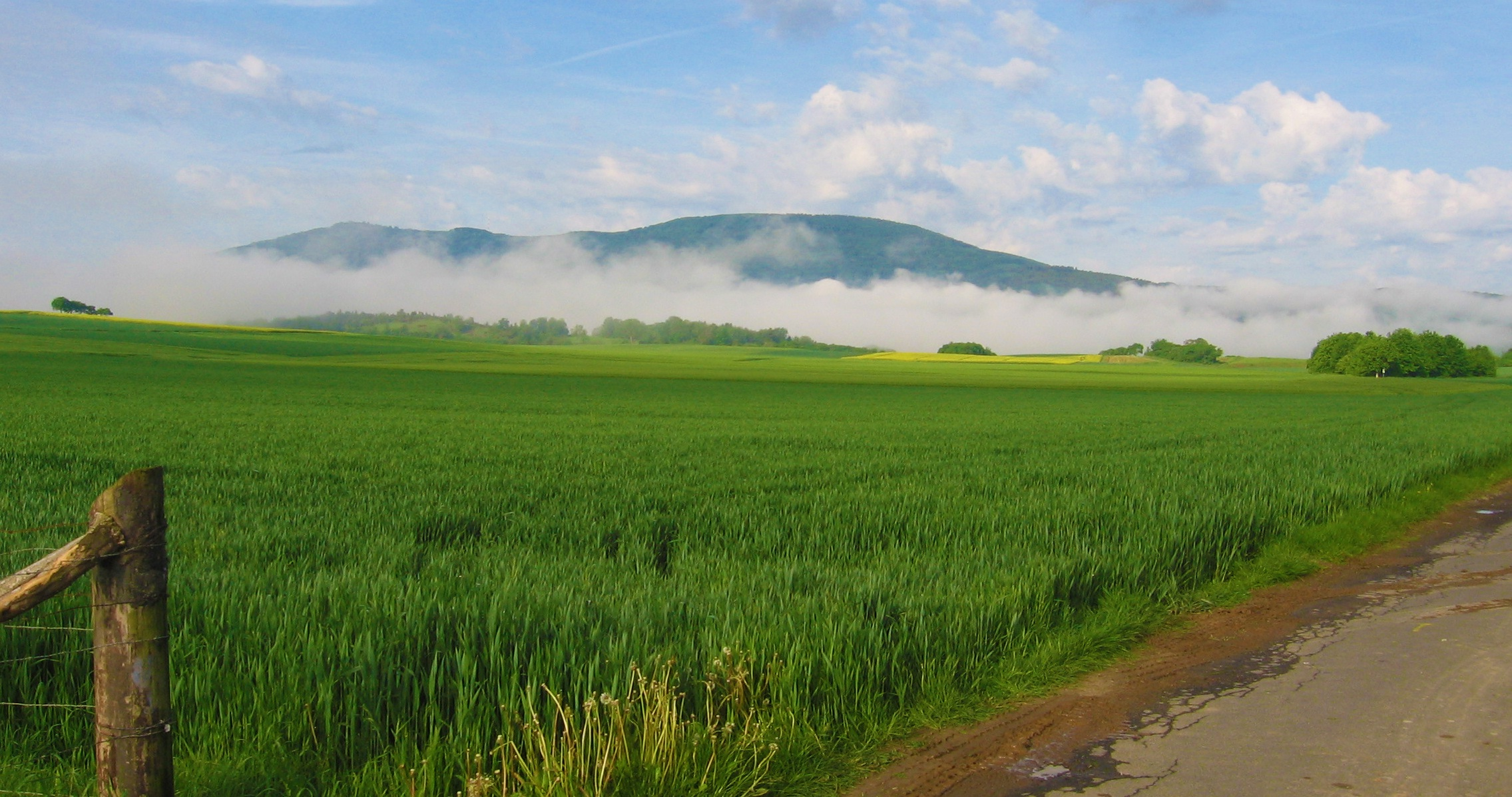
Hoher Meißner in Hesse, Germany

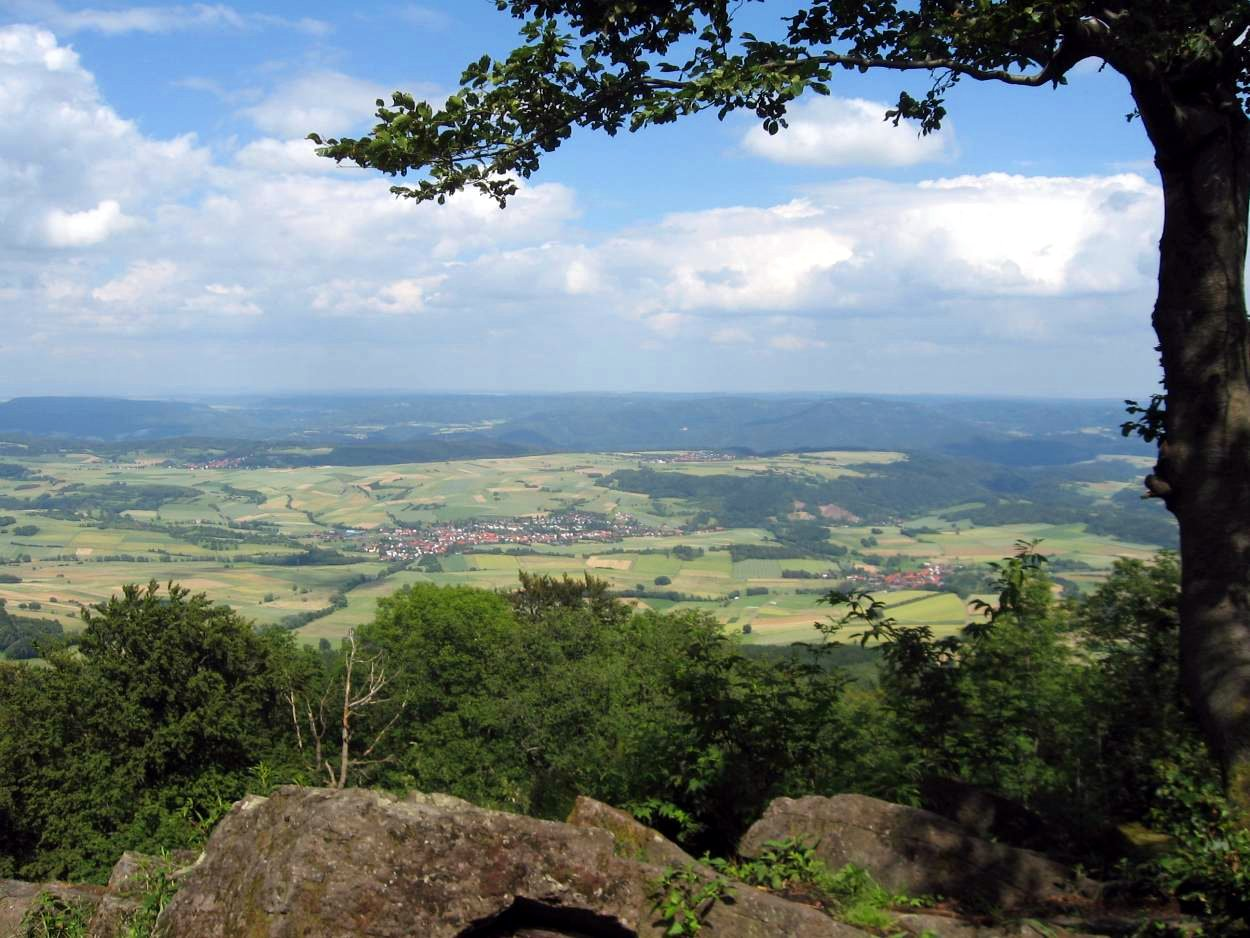
View from Kalbe at Hoher Meißner

The Hoher Meißner (German pronunciation: [ˈhoːɐ̯ ˈmaɪsnɐ]) is a mountain massif with a height of 753.6 m and is located in the Meißner-Kaufunger Wald nature park in Hesse, Germany.

== Geography ==
The Hoher Meißner is densely forested and covers an area of 10 km by 5 km. It is located approximately between Eschwege and Grossalmerode as well as Bad Sooden-Allendorf and Waldkappel. Together with large parts of the Kaufungen Forest and the Soehre forest it forms the very extensive Naturpark Meißner-Kaufunger Wald.

== Geology ==
In the Tertiary period the area was covered by thick forests. From these forests, lignite deposits were formed, which were then covered by sand and lava. The basalt formations have been eroded by weathering and were much higher at one time.

=== Highest mountain in northeast Hesse ===
- The Meißner peak is not the highest point in northern Hesse, even if it is commonly held to be. In northwest Hesse lie some mountains which are substantially higher. Notably, with an elevation of 753.6 m, the Kasseler crest is the highest peak in northeast Hesse, but not in all of Hesse.

=== Mountains ===
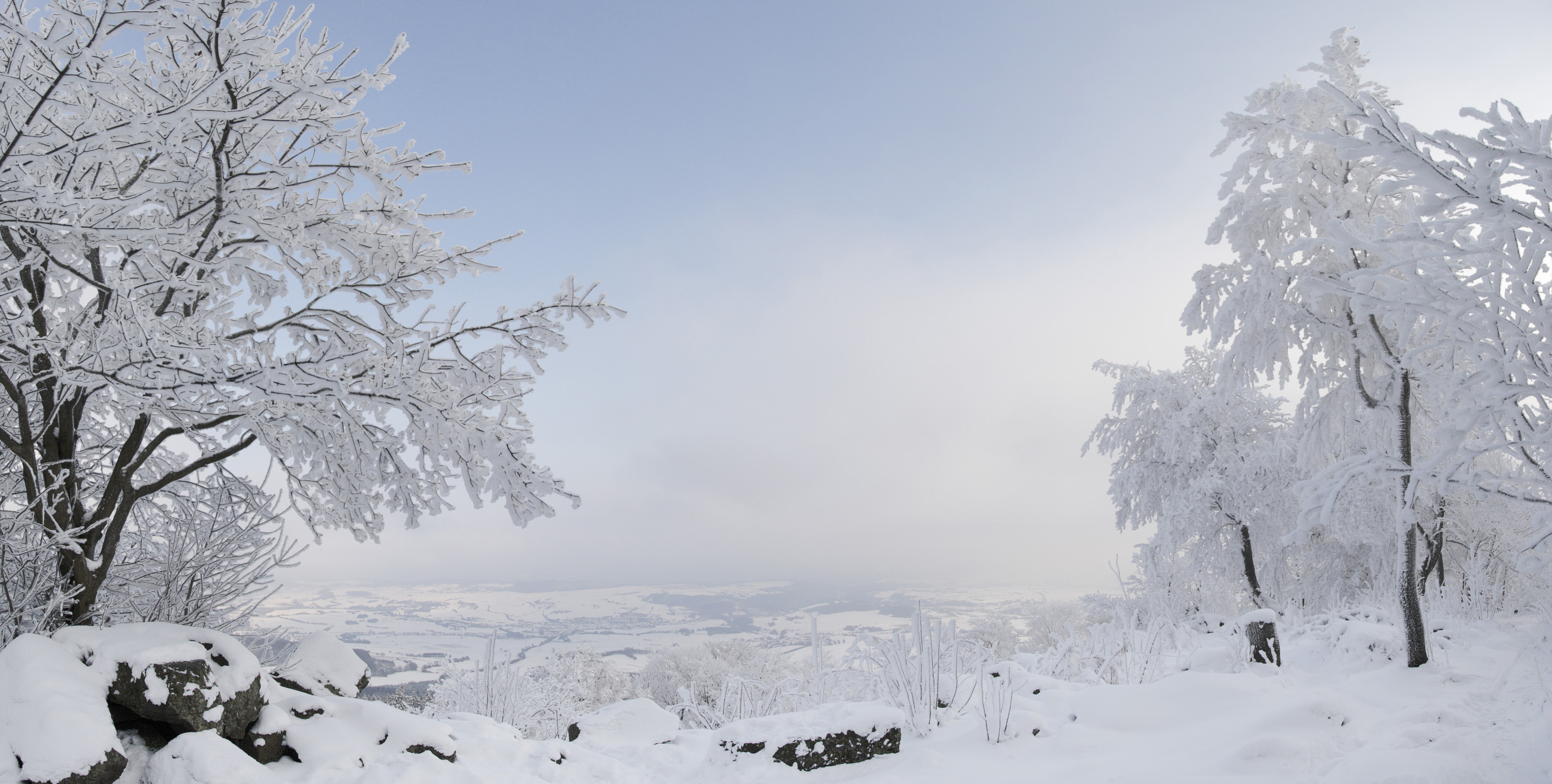
View from the Kalbe in winter

- Kasseler Kuppe (753.6 m)
- Kasseler Stein (748 m)
- Kalbe (720 m)
- Heiligenberg am Meißner (583 m)
- Bühlchen am Meißner (537 m)

== Lookout points ==
From different locations on the Meißner one can enjoy wonderful views:

- Kalbe: From this basalt crest, approximately 720 m high, there are views of the Werra Valley ("Werratal") and the Eichsfeld-Hainich-Werratal nature park. One can also see the Harz Mountains, the Thuringian Forest and the Rhön Mountains. This lookout point can only be reached on foot - e.g. by the path which begins at the Mother Hulda Pond (German: Frau-Holle-Teich).
- Schwalbenthal: This spot is easier to reach than the „Kalbe,“ but the views are hardly less attractive; it lies about 100 m lower, at a fork in the road, slightly below the "Stinksteinwand." Here there is a parking lot (elevation 620 m) with splendid views of Meißner-Vockerode, and, in the distance, Thuringia.
- Meißnerhaus: Views from the southwest side of the mountain include, among other things, the ranges of the Kellerwald, the Habichtswald and the Kaufunger Wald.

== Mining ==
The lignite mining industry began around 1560, after gloss coal bits were discovered in a brook, and persisted until 1929. The coal was used, for example, as fuel for salt production in Bad Sooden Allendorf and at the large power station in Kassel.

- Stinksteinwand and Schwalbenthal: Striking evidence of the centuries-long practice of mining on the Meißner is given by the so-called Stinksteinwand ("stinking stone wall"), located above Schwalbenthal on the east face of the mountain. In former times coal was extracted there, by sub-surface mining. This coal was prone to spontaneous combustion, and for centuries people on the surface have seen and smelled the smoke from the smoldering fires in the subterranean coal seams. Even in recent times all attempts to extinguish these fires have failed, so that one can often notice a sulfur-like smell—sometimes quite strong—at the Schwalbenthal parking lot or beyond. Slightly below the Stinksteinwand lies the Gasthaus Schwalbenthal inn, the last remaining building in a mining industry settlement of about 10 houses, demolished because of the danger of landslides.
- Bransrode: Bransrode, on the northwest side of the mountain massif, is the site of the last sub-surface coal mine in the area, which was closed in 1929. Immediately thereafter, the quarrying of basalt began, which continued until 2003.
- Kalbe (former open pit mine): From 1949 to 1974 lignite coal was mined at Kalbe. Since then, the former mine has filled with water which is up to 30 m deep and which has a surface area of 20,000 m^{2}. The pit's impressive basalt shelves rise above the lake. In order to access the coal seams, the basalt over it had to be removed. It was dumped down the mountain slope, where it formed piles which can be seen today.

== Transmission facility ==
The Hoher Meissner transmitter is a facility for medium-wave, FM- and TV-broadcasting. The complex is made up of three guyed lattice steel masts, the tallest of which is 220 metres high, and a 40-metre free-standing lattice tower.

== See also ==
- Frau-Holle-Teich
