= Knüll =

Mountain in Germany

Coordinates: 50°53′N 9°28′E

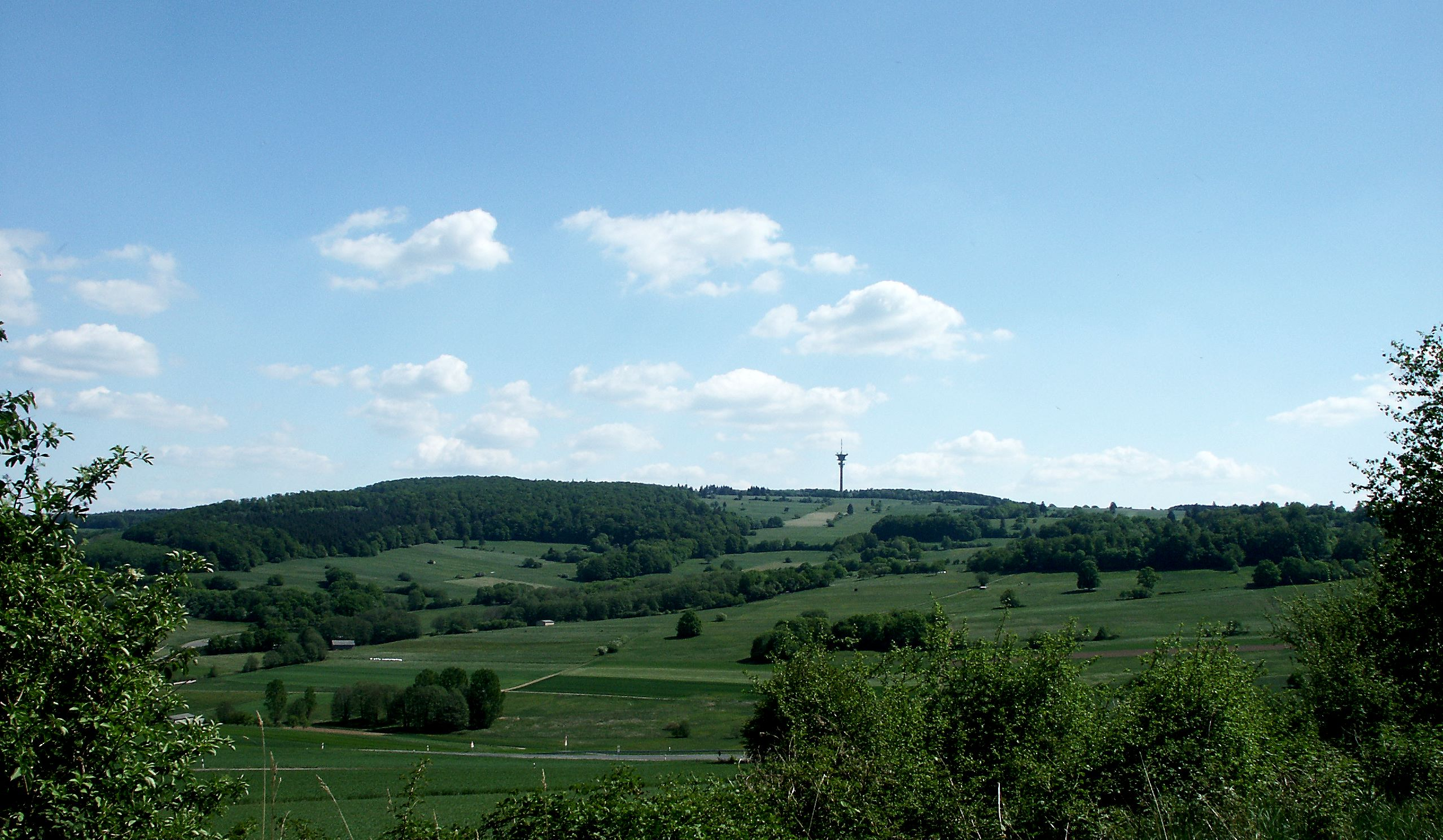
Eisenberg.

The Knüllgebirge (German pronunciation: [ˈknʏlɡəˌbɪʁɡə]) or simply Knüll ([knʏl]) is a small mountain range in the northern part of Hesse, Germany, approximately 45 kilometres (28 mi) south of Kassel. Its highest peak is the Eisenberg, with an altitude of 635.5 metres (2,085 ft). The area is heavily forested and has a low population density compared to neighbouring regions. The principal town of the region is Schwarzenborn, with a population of 1158 (2006), which is the site of German army Jägerregiment 1 headquarters.
