= Schwalm (Eder) =

River in Germany

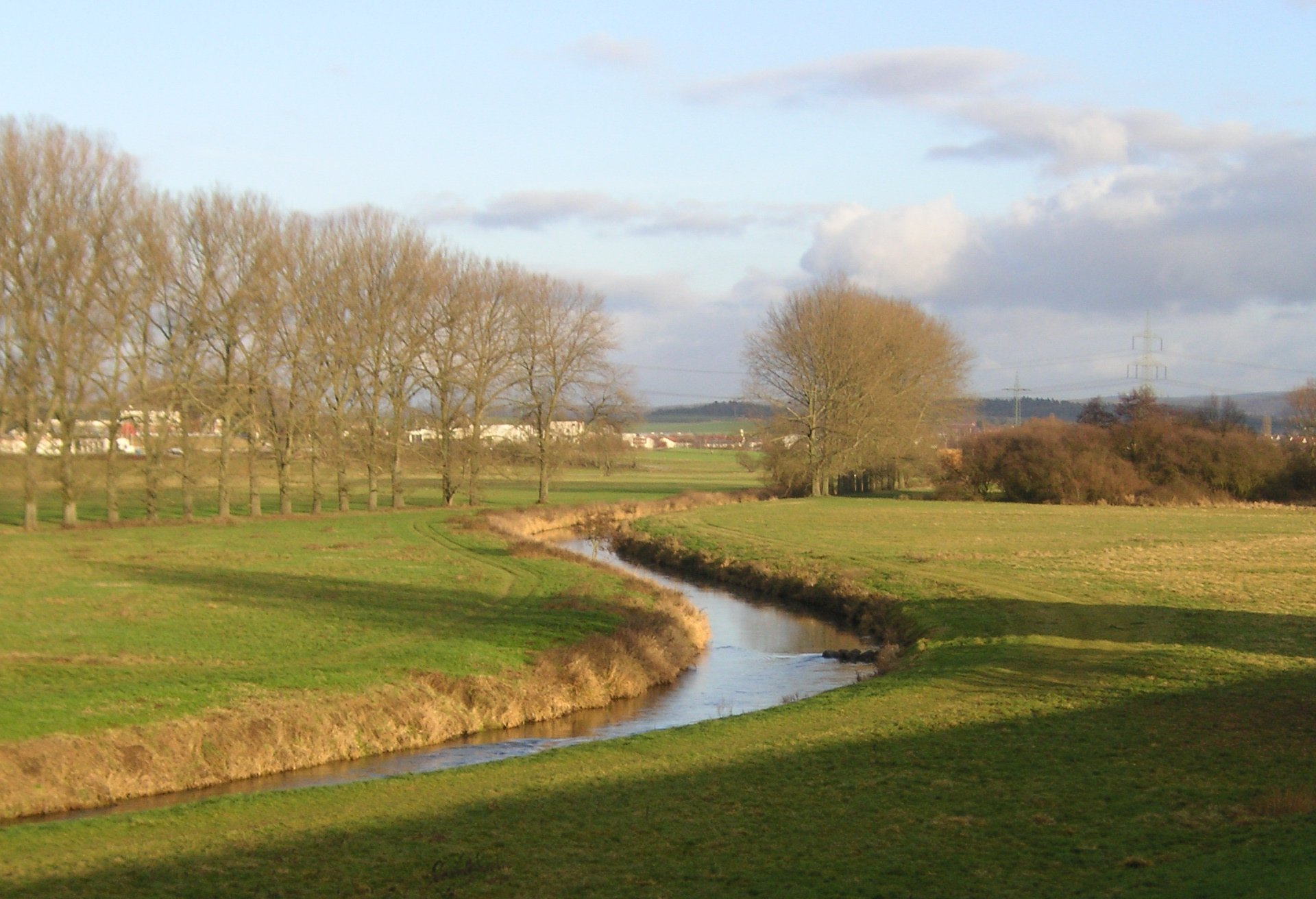
- The Schwalm in Schwalmstadt

Location
- Country: Germany
- State: Hesse

Physical characteristics
- Source
  - location: Vogelsberg Mountains
- Mouth
  - location: Eder
  - coordinates: 51°7′4″N 9°24′25″E
- Length: 97.3 km (60.5 mi)
- Basin size: 1,298 km^{2} (501 sq mi)

Basin features
- Progression: Eder→ Fulda→ Weser→ North Sea

The Schwalm (German pronunciation: [ʃvalm]) is a river in Hesse, Germany, right tributary of the Eder. It rises on the north side of the Vogelsberg Mountains. It flows north through Alsfeld, Schwalmstadt and Borken. The Schwalm flows into the Eder near Wabern, east of Fritzlar, after a total length of 97 km (60 mi). The main tributaries are the Efze, the Gilsa, the Grenff and the Antrift.
