= Urff =

River in Germany

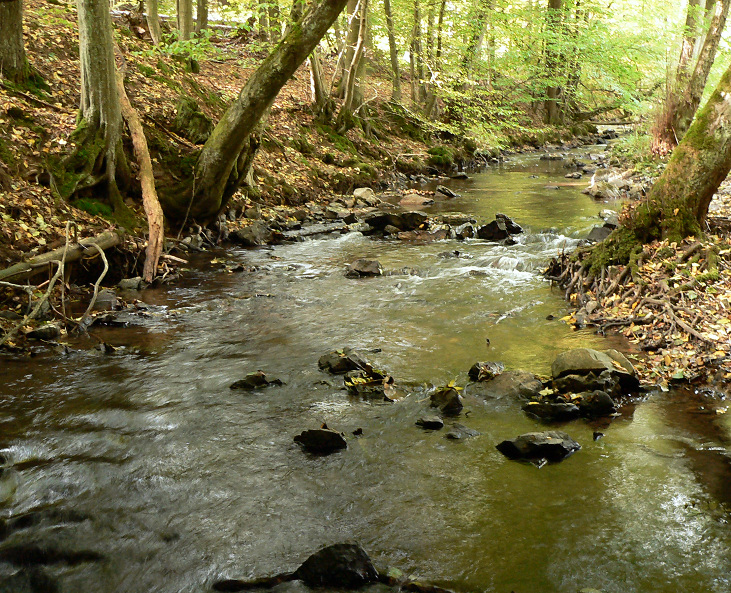

Location
- Country: Germany
- State: Hesse

Physical characteristics
- Mouth
  - location: Schwalm
  - coordinates: 51.0370°N 9.2053°E
- Length: 20.2 km (12.6 mi)

Basin features
- Progression: Schwalm→ Eder→ Fulda→ Weser→ North Sea

Urff is a 20.1-kilometre-long (12.5 mi) tributary of the river Schwalm in Waldeck-Frankenberg and Schwalm-Eder-Kreis, North Hesse (Germany). It flows into the Schwalm near Niederurff.

== History ==
The Urff starts in the Kellerwald. Its source lies west-southwest of the Bad Wildungen district of Hundsdorf and east-northeast of the Haina district of Löllbach on the transition area between Große Aschkoppe (639.8 m) in the southeast, Alter Koppe (591.4 m) in the southwest, and Wölftekopf (567.1 m) in the north-northeast.

The Urff runs through the wooded Kellerwald-Edersee Nature Park in an eastward direction and through Hundsdorf, where it bends to the south-east towards Armsfeld. Below Armsfeld, south of Auenberg (610.7 m), the creek turns east and flows past the villages of Fischbach and Bergfreiheit, the ruins of Löwenstein Castle (341.2 m), and Oberurff-Schiffelborn after Niederurff.

The confluence of the Urff in the Schwalm is in the Löwensteiner Grund south-east of Niederurff at a height of about 193.5 m; to the northeast rises the Altenburg (432.7 m).

== Catchment Area and Tributaries ==
The Urff is an Order III body of water. Its drainage basin covers 41.74 km^{2}.

The tributaries of the Urff include, among others (viewed downstream):

- Heerbach (on the right; confluence between Hundsdorf and Armsfeld)
- Appenbach (on the right; confluence between Armsfeld and Berg Freiheit)
- Kohlbach (on the left; confluence between Armsfeld and Berg Freiheit)

== Localities ==
The villages on the Urff are (viewed downstream):

- Bad Wildungen - Hundsdorf
- Bad Wildungen - Armsfeld
- Bad Wildungen - Bergfreiheit
- Bad Zwesten - Oberurff-Schiffelborn
- Bad Zwesten - Niederurff

== See also ==
- List of rivers of Hesse
