= Grenff =

River in Germany

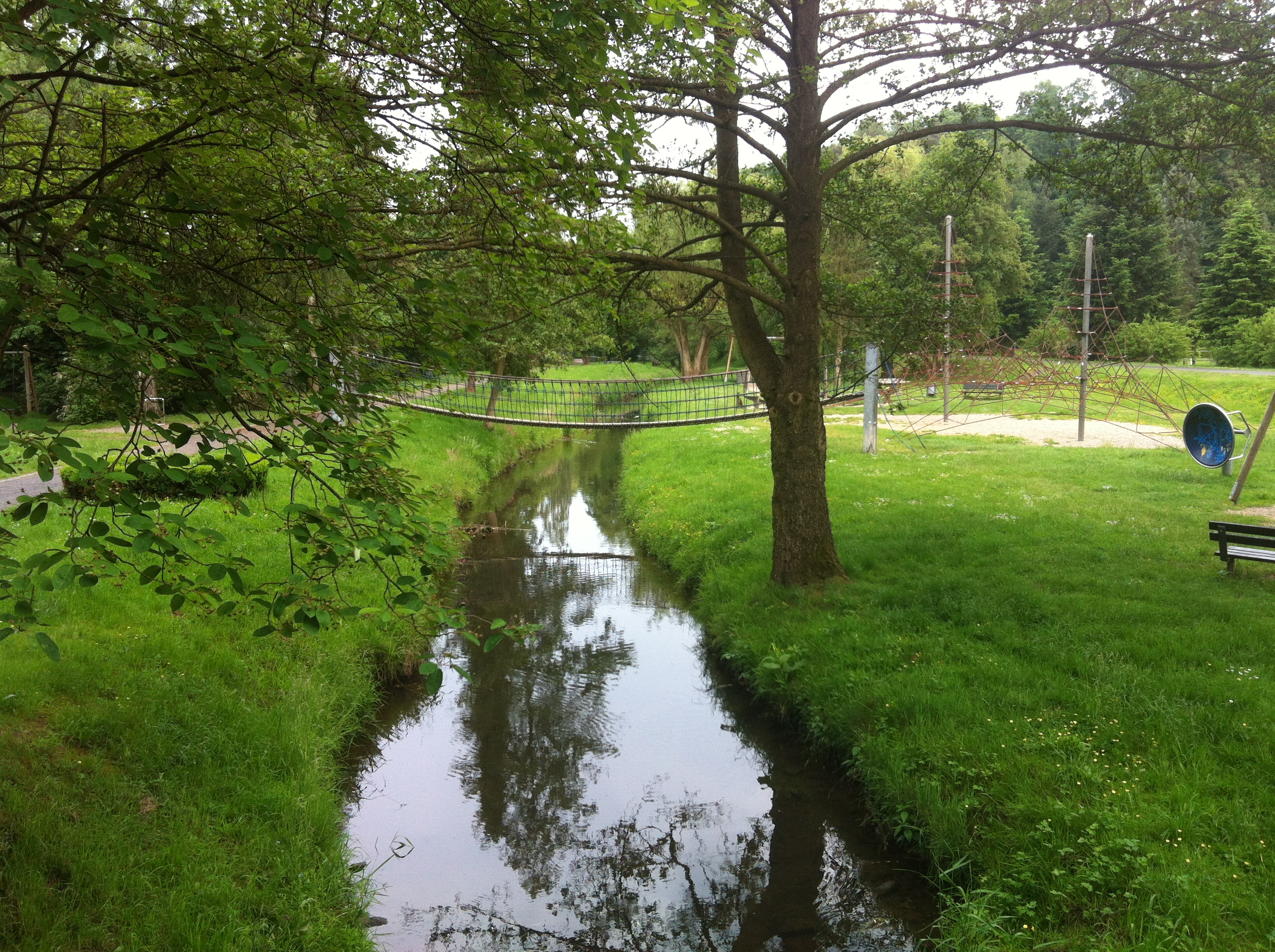
- Grenff at Neukirchen

Location
- Country: Germany
- State: Hesse

Physical characteristics
- Mouth
  - location: Schwalm
  - coordinates: 50°53′5″N 9°15′25″E
- Length: 21.9 km (13.6 mi)
- Basin size: 86.4 km^{2} (33.4 sq mi)

Basin features
- Progression: Schwalm→ Eder→ Fulda→ Weser→ North Sea

The Grenff, also Grenf, is a 22 km long, right-bank or southeasterly tributary of the Schwalm. It passes through the East Hesse Highlands in North Hesse Schwalm-Eder-Kreis, and belongs to the river system and catchment area of the Weser.

== Course ==
The Grenff rises in Ottrauer Highland, a part of the Fulda-Haune Plateau in East Hesse Highlands, in the transition area to the Knüllgebirge. The source is 1.2 km southeast of the village Görzhain (municipality Ottrau) in a clearing of the northern flank of the Frohnkreuzkopf (about 530 m above sea level (NN)), the western spur of the Rimberg (591.8 m), at about 395 m elevation.

The Grenff initially flows north-west, to and through Görzhain. From there on the Bad Hersfeld–Treysa railway (also Knüllwald railway) runs through the Grenff valley. It passes along the settlement Bahnhof Ottrau and a number of watermills (Boßmühle, Steinmühle, Lenzenmühle, Schneidmühle) and the village Kleinropperhausen. Then the Grenff flows through the riverside town Nausis, past the Bruchmühle, Neukirchen, and Rückershausen, after which it passes the Sängermühle, and Riebelsdorf. Then it passes the station Zella and the Klinkemühle. At the village of Loshausen (Willingshausen municipality) it flows into the Eder tributary Schwalm that comes from the south, after descending 181 m in elevation.

== Catchment and tributaries ==
The Grenff has a 86.406 km^{2} drainage basin. Its tributaries are orographic allocation (l. = on the left side, r. = on the right side) , river length and confluence location, Grenff river kilometer (starting from the mouth ):

- Reinsbach (r. 1.5 km) above Görzhain (near km 21)
- Weissenborn (r. 2.2 km), in Görzhain (at km 20.05)
- Leutschwasser (l. 2, 2 km), in Görzhain (at km 19.55)
- Schorbach (r. 5.2 km), at the Stone mill (near km 17,05)
- Otter (l. 5.6 kilometers) above the Lenz mill (at km 15.8)
- Wallebach (l. 2.5 km), in Nausis (near 12.8 km)
- Fischbach (l. 1.5 km), in Nausis (near 11.9 km)
- Damersbach (r. 3.3 km), below Nausis (near 11.6 km)
- Buchenbach (r. 7.7 kilometers) above Neukirchen (near km 9.8)
- Urbach (r. 7.3 km) Neukirchen (near km 8.1)
- Goldbach (r. 2.9 km), at Rückershausen (in km 6.1)
