= Grom-Bach =

River in Germany

Location
- Country: Germany
- State: Hesse

Physical characteristics
- Source
  - elevation: 278 m (912 ft)
- Mouth
  - location: Ohebach
  - coordinates: 50.9788°N 9.3242°E
  - elevation: 252 m (827 ft)

Basin features
- Progression: Ohebach→ Efze→ Schwalm→ Eder→ Fulda→ Weser→ North Sea

The Grom-Bach is a small river of Hesse, Germany.

The Grom-Bach flows into the Ohebach in Frielendorf. Its source is located southeast of Linsingen at an altitude of 278 m (912 ft) above sea level. From Linsingen, the Grom-Bach flows in a northeastern direction, turns after about 600 metres (660 yards) to the north-west. Shortly before the village of Todenhausen, the Grom-Bach turns into an easterly direction, then into a southerly direction to flow to Spieskappel. Before the Grom-Bach reaches Spieskappel, it turns again to the north-east and immediately after passing under the federal highway B 254, it merges with the approaching Hohlenbach coming from the south. Up to the mouth in the Ohebach (near Weidemühle) at the northern end of the village Frielendorf, the Grom-Bach covered a length of 4.65 km (2.89 mi) and a height difference of approximately 36 metres (118 feet).

== See also ==
- List of rivers of Hesse
