= Rinnebach (Ohebach) =

River in Germany

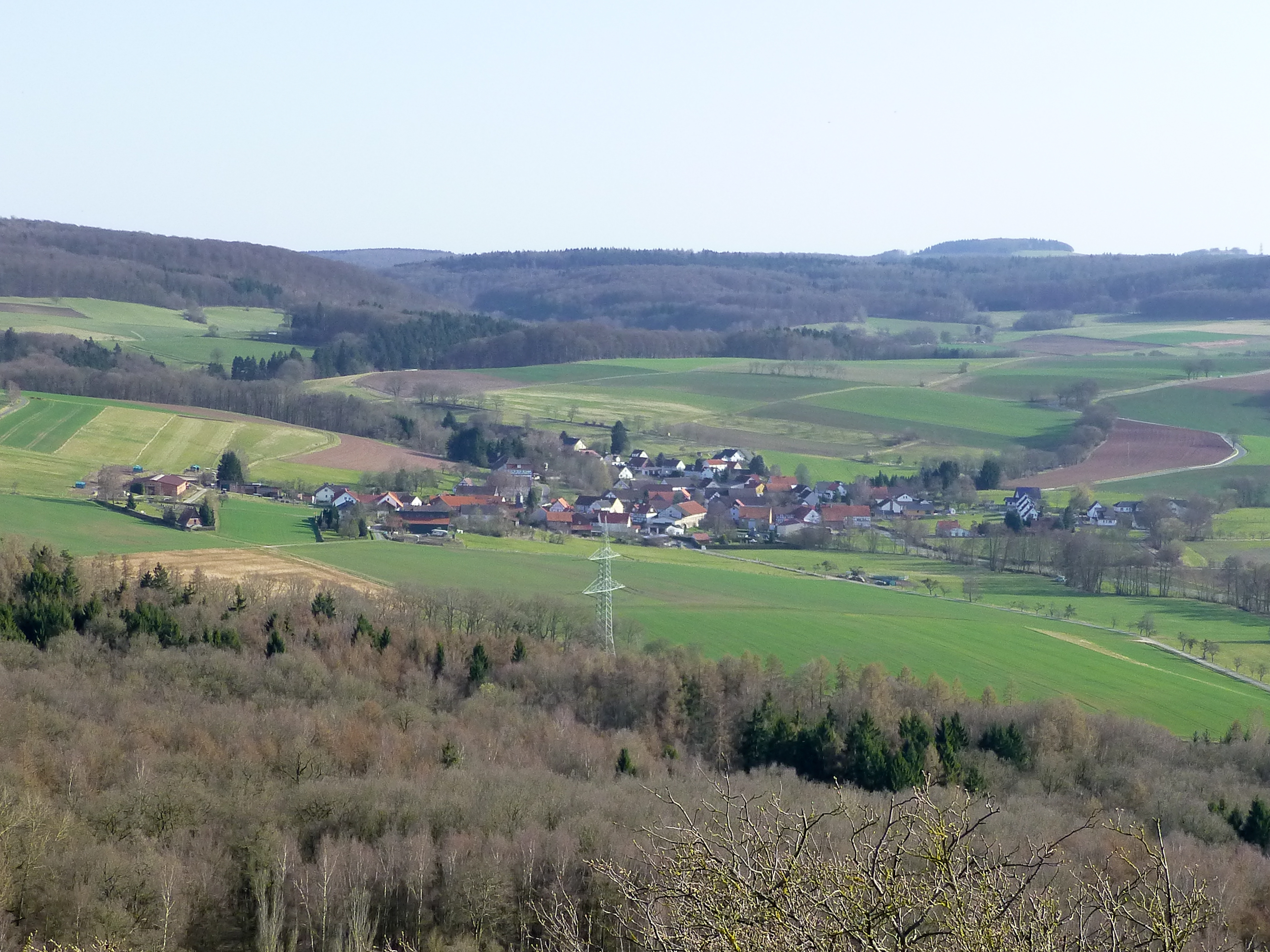

Location
- Country: Germany
- State: Hesse

Physical characteristics
- Source
  - location: north of Schwarzenborn
  - coordinates: 50.9292°N 9.4193°E
- Mouth
  - location: Ohebach
  - coordinates: 51.0143°N 9.3709°E

Basin features
- Progression: Ohebach→ Efze→ Schwalm→ Eder→ Fulda→ Weser→ North Sea

Rinnebach is a small river of Hesse, Germany. It springs north of Schwarzenborn. It flows into the Ohebach west of Homberg.

== See also ==
- List of rivers of Hesse
