= Forest Cultural Heritage =

Forest Cultural Heritage (German: Waldkulturerbe) is a term coined by the Federal Ministry of Food, Agriculture and Consumer Protection (BMEL) in the context of the German campaign for the International Year of Forests in 2011.

The International Year of Forests was intended to draw global attention to the great importance of sustainable management, conservation, and sustainable development of forests for the benefit of present and future generations. Based on the outstanding universal value of UNESCO World Heritage Sites, the campaign activities in Germany were held under the slogan "Discover our Forest Cultural Heritage!" (German: „Entdecken Sie unser Waldkulturerbe!“).

== Forest as Part of Historical and Cultural Identity ==
In Germany, far beyond its role as a provider of raw materials, the forest was an inseparable part and companion of past generations. The forest acts as a silent witness and preserver of the legacy of long-past peoples and generations: Cult sites, settlements, defensive fortifications, etc., from all eras have survived here as ground monuments and bear witness to a eventful past.

From an economic perspective, timber production plays an outstanding role today just as it did in the past: wood is the most important domestic raw material. It is renewable, environmentally friendly, and versatile. Germany is poor in natural resources. Forests are a natural source of raw materials that, under sustainable management and constant environmental conditions, are fundamentally available permanently.

== Forest as Part of Cultural Landscapes ==
In Germany, forests are an essential landscape-shaping element in cultural landscapes, including their often region-typical forest-field distribution. Germany is naturally a "woodland country". Today, around 31 percent of its land area is covered by forest. After agriculture, forestry is the most significant land use form by area.

At the beginning of the Modern Era, forests in Germany were reduced to far less than their current area and heavily overexploited. Against the background of historical forest development, high population density, and anthropogenic environmental changes, completely natural forest ecosystems untouched by humans (so-called primary forests) have not existed in Germany for a long time. The vast majority (approximately 99 percent) of forests in Germany are classified as "semi-natural" according to the MCPFE classification for naturalness. Present-day forests in Germany are the result of human influence and thus the product of "cultural creation".

This will remain the case across most of the German forest area in the future, even though forestry has increasingly worked using methods of close-to-nature forest management for around three decades. A core element is the transformation of pure coniferous stands into site-appropriate deciduous or mixed deciduous stands. In the future, native tree species should be increasingly used when establishing new forests. At 39 percent, a considerable proportion of broadleaf and mixed forests has now been achieved in Germany.

However, refraining from land use is also an expression of cultural and social intention: this applies on a small scale to leaving habitat trees, old-growth and deadwood islands, and establishing unmanaged forest areas within managed forests, as well as on a large scale to creating extensive forest protection areas, for example in national parks.

On June 20, the UNESCO World Heritage Committee in Paris decided to include the "Ancient Beech Forests of Germany" on the World Heritage List. As a result, selected forest areas across five protected areas nationwide were recognized as World Natural Heritage: Jasmund National Park and the Serrahn region in Müritz National Park in Mecklenburg-Vorpommern, Grumsin Forest in the UNESCO Biosphere Reserve Schorfheide-Chorin in Brandenburg, Hainich National Park in Thuringia, and Kellerwald-Edersee National Park in Hesse.

The forestry operation Stiftungsforsten Haina established a 1.5-kilometer "Forest Cultural Heritage Trail" for the International Year of Forests.
