= Schwarzenborn, Hesse =

Schwarzenborn
- Town
- Coat of arms

- Location of Schwarzenborn within Schwalm-Eder-Kreis district
- Interactive map of Schwarzenborn
- Location within Germany Location within Hesse
- Coordinates: 50°55′N 9°26′E
- Country: Germany
- State: Hesse
- Admin. region: Kassel
- District: Schwalm-Eder-Kreis

Government
  - Mayor (2022–28): Jürgen Liebermann (SPD)

Area
  - Total: 26.9 km^{2} (10.4 sq mi)
- Elevation: 479 m (1,572 ft)

Population (2025-12-31)
  - Total: 1,088
  - Density: 40.4/km^{2} (105/sq mi)
- Time zone: UTC+01:00 (CET)
  - Summer (DST): UTC+02:00 (CEST)
- Postal codes: 34639
- Dialling codes: 05686
- Vehicle registration: HR
- Website: www.schwarzenborn.de

Schwarzenborn (German pronunciation: [ˈʃvaʁtsn̩ˌbɔʁn]) is the smallest town in Hesse, Germany. It lies in the Schwalm-Eder district some 13.5 km from Homberg in the Knüll. Through the constituent municipality of Grebenhagen flows the river Efze. The town consists of the two centres of Grebenhagen and Schwarzenborn.

== Politics ==
=== Coat of arms ===
Schwarzenborn's civic coat of arms might be heraldically described thus: Argent a goat-headed spreadeagle sable langued gules, surmounted by an inescutcheon sable a mullet of six Or.

Schwarzenborn's arms bear a likeness to both Neukirchen's and Schwalmstadt's. All three have the goat-headed spreadeagle and a star on the inescutcheon (small shield within the bigger one), but colouring varies among the three.

=== Town partnerships ===
- Saint-Gervais-sur-Roubion, France since 7 May 2005

== Economy and infrastructure ==
The town is well known for being a Bundeswehr base with a large training area, furnishing some 300 jobs to local civilians, making the Bundeswehr the town's biggest employer. The garrison is home of the Jägerbataillon 1 (1st Ranger battalion) which is part of the Panzerbrigade 21 based in Augustdorf.

=== Transport ===
The Hersfeld-West Autobahn interchange on the A 7 (Kassel – Würzburg) is about 15 km away.

Schwarzenborn is joined to the railway network through the stations at Schwalmstadt-Treysa and Bad Hersfeld.
