= Treibacher Industrie AG =

Austrian chemical and metallurgical company

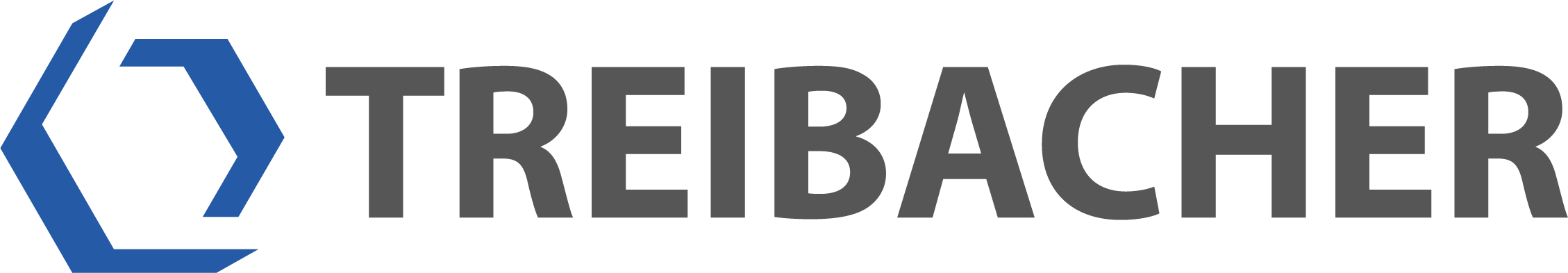
- Company type: Private
- Industry: Chemical industry, Metallurgical industry
- Founded: 1898
- Founder: Carl Auer von Welsbach
- Headquarters: Althofen, Carinthia, Austria
- Key people: Tatjana Gertner-Schaschl (chairwoman of the supervisory board)
- Website: www.treibacher.com

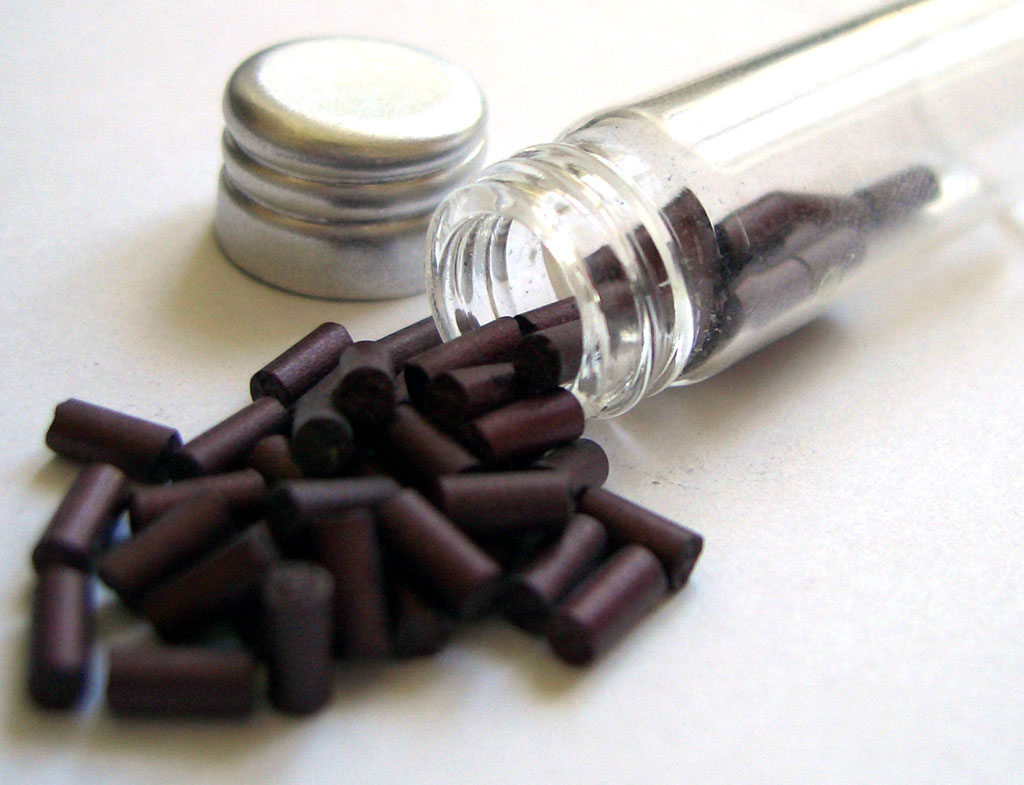
Lighter flints are still produced today.

Treibacher Industrie AG is a chemical and metallurgical company based in Treibach (municipality of Althofen) in Carinthia, Austria. It was founded in 1898 by Dr. Carl Auer von Welsbach, the inventor of the incandescent mantle and the lighter "flint" (ferrocerium) as Treibacher Chemische Werke. The company employs approximately 900 people worldwide and generated sales of 498 million euros in 2020.

Owned by Wienerberger Baustoffindustrie AG from 1990, Treibacher Industrie AG was sold to German industrialist August von Finck junior in 2000 for 126 million euros. Since 2007, the company has been owned by the private foundations of the families Erhard Schaschl, the former general manager and chairman of the supervisory board of Wienerberger AG, and Franz Rauch, the owner of Rauch fruit juices.

== Locations ==
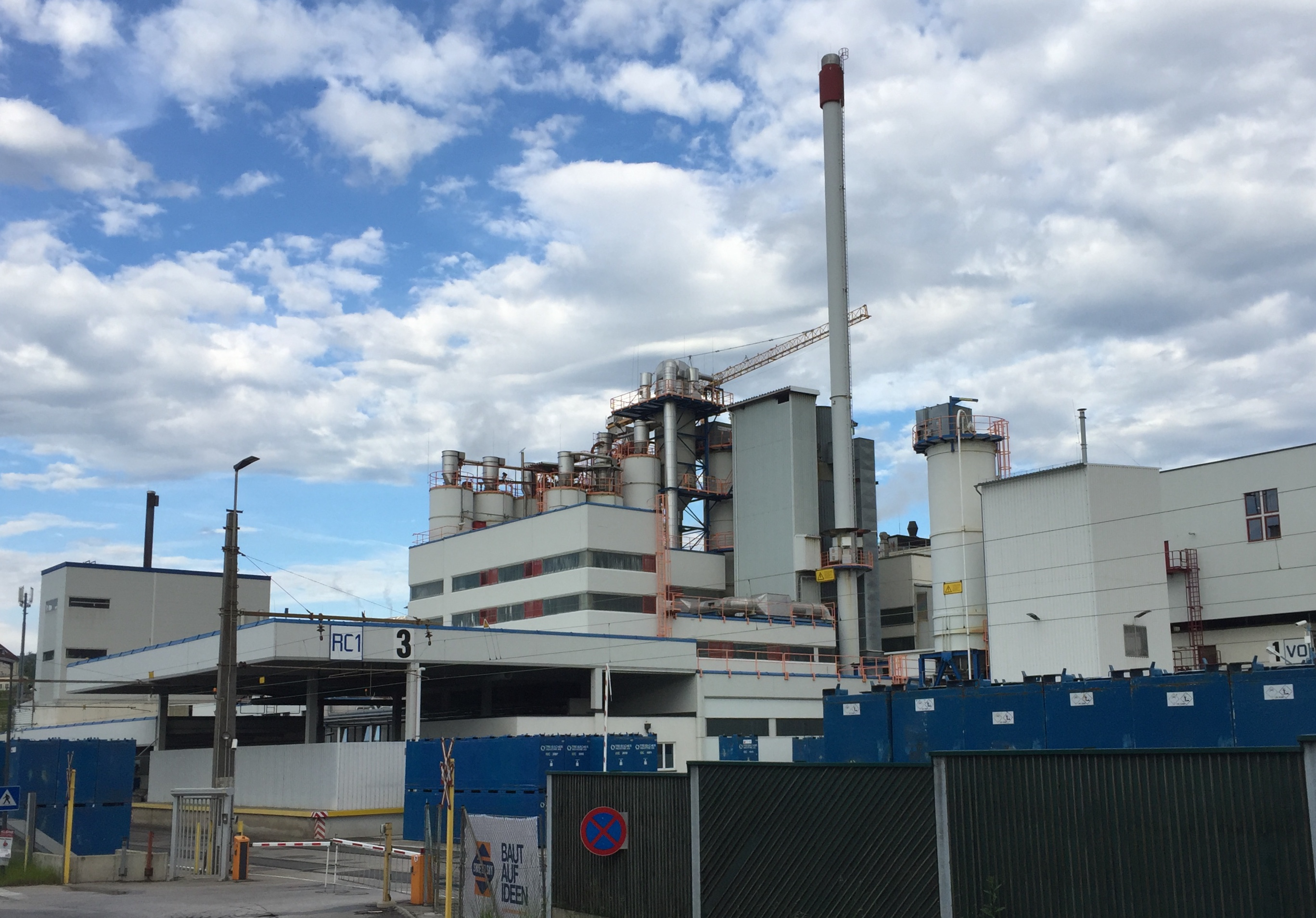
A part of the plants in Althofen

- Althofen, Austria (Headquarters and main production site)
- Minneapolis
- Shanghai
- Tokyo
- Breitungen (Leuchtstoffwerk Breitungen GmbH)
- Arnoldstein, Austria (Tribotecc GmbH)

== Business units ==
Treibacher Industrie AG is a manufacturer of chemical and metallurgical precursors for industrial applications. It produces ferrovanadium and ferromolybdenum for the steel and foundry industries, powders for the cemented carbide industry, and materials for ceramic applications, as well as fine chemicals for the pharmaceutical and catalyst industries.

The starting point for many products are rare earth elements, and also tungsten and tantalum oxide and molybdenum, as well as steel mill slags containing vanadium.

The recycling division of Treibacher Industrie AG processes spent metal-containing catalysts from the European petroleum industry and uses these residual materials to produce high-quality alloys and additives again.

In 2010, Treibacher Industrie AG received the Innovation Award for Continuous Innovation Achievements from the province of Carinthia and was also among the last six nominees for the Austrian State Prize for Innovation.

Approximately 85% of its products are sold abroad, primarily in Europe, but also in Asia and North and South America.

== History ==
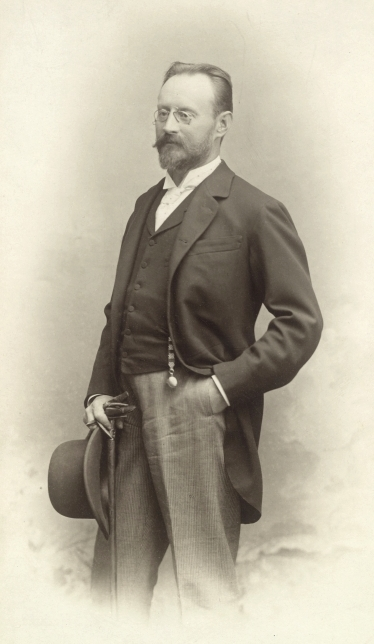
Founder Carl Auer von Welsbach

The chemist Carl Auer von Welsbach had already experimented with rare earths during his studies and, after receiving his doctorate and returning to Vienna in 1885, developed the incandescent mantle an incandescent element utilizing rare earths, that represented a significant advance for gas lighting commonly used at the time and became an economic success.

von Welsbach also worked on electric light and patented the first usable metal filament lamp in 1898. In the same year, he founded the Treibacher Chemische Werke. After the invention and patenting of the "flint" (ferrocerium), consisting of an alloy of cerium and iron, the company began producing the rare earth mixture mischmetal and flints in 1903, and from 1907, also manufactured lighters.

In addition to the production of flints for lighters, Welbach succeeded for the first time in separating the rare earths Neodymium, Praseodymium, Ytterbium and Lutetium. EAa large part of the production at Treibacher Industrie AG is based on rare earths. Ferroalloys have been produced since 1916. In 1978, the company began recycling materials containing metals.

In 1994, Treibacher Schleifmittel GmbH was spun off as an independent company and is now part of the French Imerys Group under the company name Imerys Fused Minerals Villach GmbH with its subsidiary.

In 1996, Treibacher Auermet was founded in Ravne/Slovenia, but sold again in 2015. In 2012, Treibacher Industrie AG received the Ministry of the Environment's "Phoenix" waste management award. In 2013, Treibacher Industrie AG purchased Leuchtstoffwerk Breitungen GmbH and in 2016, Tribotecc GmbH, a manufacturer of metal sulfides, was acquired by Treibacher Industrie AG

== Literature ==
- Roland Adunka, Mary Virginia Orna: Carl Auer von Welsbach: Chemist, Inventor, Entrepreneur, 2018, ISBN 978-3-319-77905-8
