= Johanneskirchenkopf =

Coordinates: 51°08′51″N 9°12′33″E

Highest point
- Elevation: 332 m (1,089 ft)

Geography
- Location: Schwalm-Eder-Kreis, Hesse, Germany

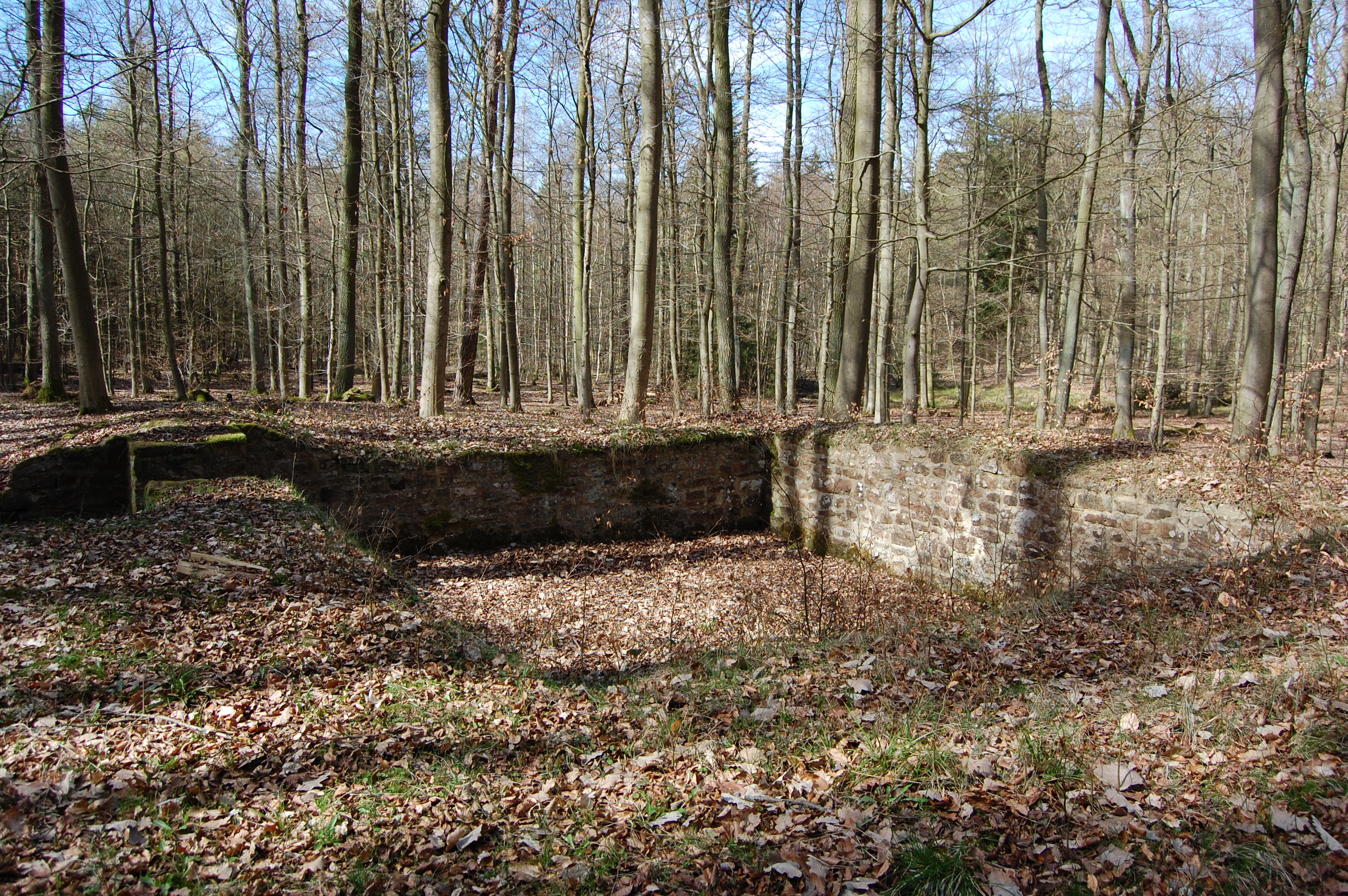

Johanneskirchenkopf is a hill in the county of Schwalm-Eder-Kreis, Hesse, Germany.
