= Peterskopf =

Peterskopf may refer to:

- Peterskopf (Haardt), a hill in Germany
- Peterskopf (Kellerwald), a mountain in Germany
