= Asterode =

Coordinates: 50°51′00″N 009°23′00″E

Asterode is a municipal district of the town of Neukirchen in Schwalm-Eder-Kreis district in Hesse, Germany.
