= Treisbach (Gilsa) =

River in Germany

Location
- Country: Germany
- State: Hesse

Physical characteristics
- Mouth
  - location: Gilsa
  - coordinates: 50.9986°N 9.1514°E

Basin features
- Progression: Gilsa→ Schwalm→ Eder→ Fulda→ Weser→ North Sea

Treisbach is a small river of Hesse, Germany. It flows into the Gilsa in Jesberg.

== See also ==
- List of rivers of Hesse
