= Schorbach (Grenff) =

River in Germany

Location
- Country: Germany
- States: Hesse

Physical characteristics
- Mouth
  - location: Grenff
  - coordinates: 50°49′33″N 9°24′17″E

Basin features
- Progression: Grenff→ Schwalm→ Eder→ Fulda→ Weser→ North Sea

Schorbach is a small river of Hesse, Germany. It flows into the Grenff near Ottrau.

== See also ==
- List of rivers of Hesse
