= Kellerwald =

Mountain range in Hesse, Germany

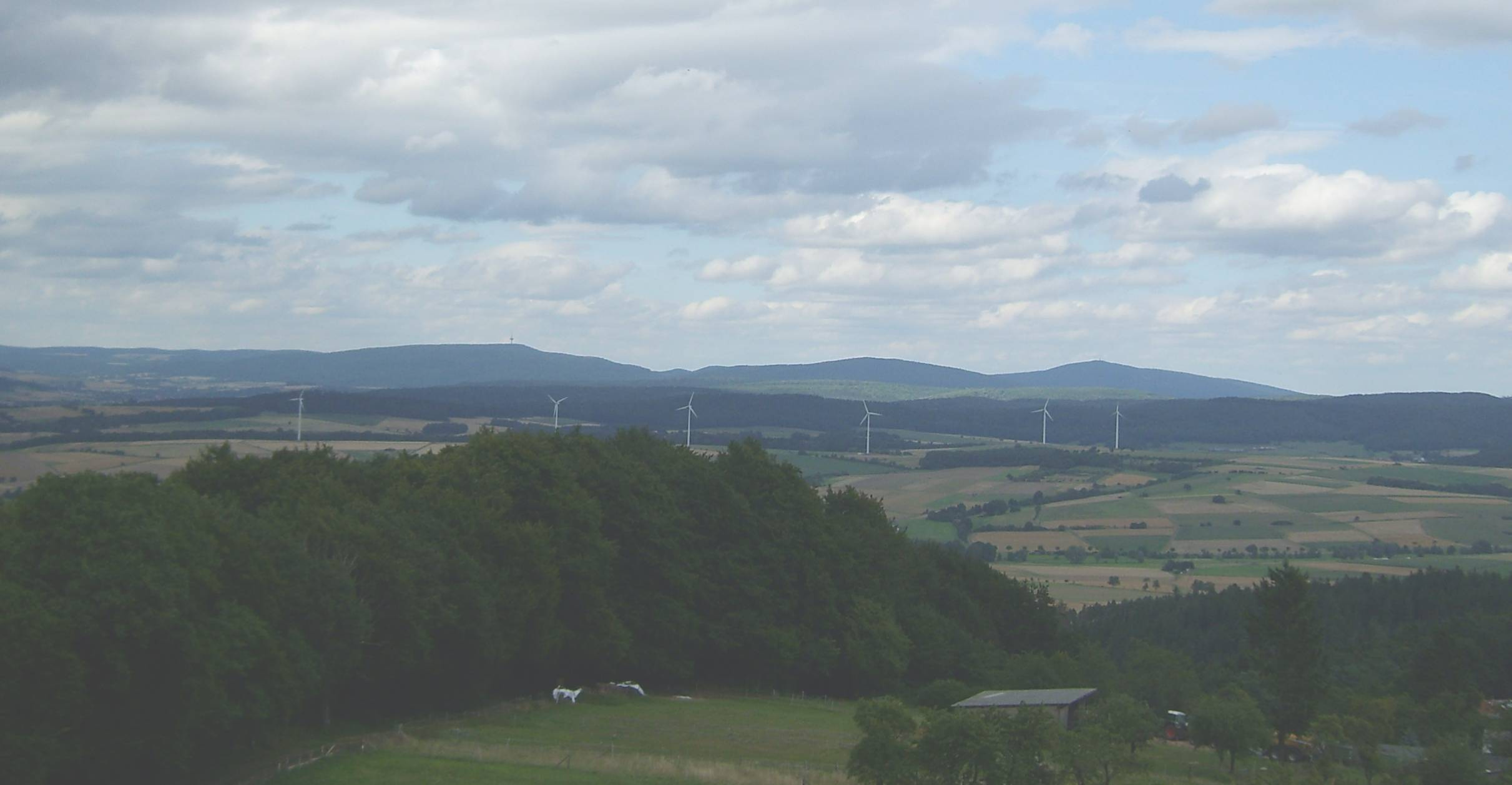
- The Kellerwald on the horizon. The three peaks are: the Hohes Lohr (656.7 m, left), Jeust (ca. 585 m, centre) and Wüstegarten (675.3 m, right); in front are the Gilserberg Heights.

Highest point
- Peak: Wüstegarten
- Elevation: 675.3 m above NN

Geography
- Location within Hesse
- State(s): Hesse, Germany
- Range coordinates: 51°00′59″N 9°05′03″E
- Parent range: Rhenish Massif

The Kellerwald (German pronunciation: [ˈkɛlɐvalt]) is a low mountain range reaching heights of up to 675 m in the western part of northern Hesse, Germany. Its assets include Germany's largest contiguous beech woodland and it contains Hesse's only national park, the Kellerwald-Edersee National Park. It is a UNESCO World Heritage Site.

== Geography ==
The Kellerwald lies in northern Hesse in the district Schwalm-Eder. Abutting the northeast, the Kellerwald's heights slope down into the Eder Valley, and towards the east and southeast they fall off into the Schwalm Valley. In the southwest, the range goes by way of the Wohra Valley into the Burgwald range and in the west, beyond the river Eder, lies the Breite Struth (a range of hills).

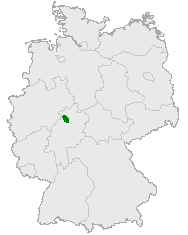
Kellerwald's location in Germany

Within the Kellerwald are the Ederhöhen (the "Eder Heights", a mountainous region in the range's north), whose area roughly coincides with the aforesaid national park, the Wildunger Bergland ("Wildungen Highlands"), which makes up the middle part of the Kellerwald, and the Keller (also known as the Hoher Keller or the Hoher Kellerwald, a mountain ridge in the south of the Kellerwald) made up of, from southwest to northeast, Jeust (585 m above sea level), Wüstegarten (675 m), Hunsrück (636 m) and Sauklippe (584 m).

== History ==
=== Geology ===
Geologically the Kellerwald, made up mainly of palaeozoic rocks, belongs to the Rhenish Slate Mountains. Scenically, however, it is also grouped as a separate entity with the Hessian Basin, because the rivers Eder and Itter form a natural boundary. Important rock types include the so-called Kellerwald quartzite, radiolarian rock, shale, greywacke and diabase. A regional peculiarity is the dark red Kellerwald agate, an Eisenkiesel, a "quartz that is turned opaque red with hematite inclusions".

=== Name origin ===
The Kellerwald is named after the mountain ridge called the Keller, mentioned above. Where the name Keller came from is interpreted two different ways: Beginning about 1600, the woodlands were in heavy use in charcoal making for the many ironworks and copperworks that needed charcoal to fuel their furnaces, thus leading to the name Köhlerwald ("charcoal maker forest"), commonly pronounced Köllerwald (with an [œ] sound, rather than [ø]; this [œ] is not very different from the [ɛ] sound of Kellerwald).

The other interpretation holds that the name was originally Kahler Wald ("bare forest" or "bald forest"), a name suggested by heavy clearing in some parts of the woods at one time.

Either process could have yielded the name Kellerwald used today through sound shifts.

Wald simply means "forest" in German.

== Conservation status ==
The Kellerwald is subject to a special conservation status. Almost its whole unspoilt natural area belongs to the Kellerwald-Edersee Nature Park. The northern part, with an area of 57.24 km^{2} has been designated since 1 January 2004 as the Kellerwald-Edersee National Park.

Furthermore, a great area is part of the European network "Natura 2000" (Special Area of Conservation and Special Protection Area), as well as, in parts, Bannwald, a German designation for wooded wildernesses allowed to grow naturally without any human intervention. Further Special Areas of Conservation are, among others, the oak forests on the steep slopes at the Edersee, the aforesaid Keller in the southern part of the nature park and the Urff, a linear Special Area of Conservation from the source to the river's mouth into the Schwalm. In small areas, there are also nature reserves and protected scenic areas. The conservation efforts have yielded, perhaps most importantly, one of Central Europe's last contiguous broadleaf forests of international grade.

The predominant woodland type is described as acidic-soil woodrush-beech forest.

In 2005, the Kellerwald-Edersee Nature Park was brought by the Federal Office for Nature Conservation (Bundesamt für Naturschutz) into the programme called the "Great Nature Conservation Project of Pan-Governmentally Representative Importance" (Naturschutzgroßprojekt von gesamtstaatlich repräsentativer Bedeutung).

== Flora and fauna ==
=== Flora ===
Since the 19th century, the northern part of the Kellerwald (since 2004, the Kellerwald-Edersee National Park), as hunting woods for the Princes of Waldeck, has been surrounded by gates. To be found here are some particularly pristine beech forests, although they have been damaged somewhat by the high concentration of game. More than 30% of the trees are older than 140 years. The main human activity here was hunting rather than forestry. The main tree here is the beech, which is predominant here in acidic-soil (shale, greywacke, quartzite) woodrush-beech forest. Worthy of mention are the many special places on the steep slopes at the Edersee. Here are found the last remains of virgin forest and gnarled sessile oak forests with St. Bernard's lilies, and the highest incidence in Hesse of Cheddar pinks.

In the higher levels grow mountain arnica and maiden pinks, and in the valley areas western marsh orchids and early purple orchids. Near the Jägersburg near Odershausen are found a few rare dwarf beeches. In cool and damp stream dales grows the rare, highly poisonous common monkshood. In light beech and oak forests with limy subsoil is found the martagon lily. In a few places are found great stands of the rare wild daffodil.

=== Fauna ===
In the Kellerwald, parts of which are also a Special Protection Area (for birds), a number of bird species still or once again breed, among them the black stork, the common raven, six kinds of woodpecker (among them the rare middle spotted woodpecker and the grey-headed woodpecker), the black and the red kite (which here reach their highest population density anywhere in Hesse), the peregrine falcon, the Tengmalm's owl, the honey buzzard, the Eurasian eagle owl and the great grey shrike.

One of the Kellerwald's characteristic animals is the red deer. In the Kellerwald-Edersee National Park are found fallow deer and European mouflon. Besides these, roe deer and wild boar are also common. The wildcat is rare.

In the area that is now the national park, the first raccoons, whose natural habitat is in North America, were released into the wild in Germany on 12 April 1934 by Wilhelm Sittich Freiherr von Berlepsch (1881–1948; "Freiherr" is a title, roughly equivalent to "Baron"). Since that time, they have spread far beyond the confines of the Kellerwald. Foxes, badgers, pine martens, beech martens, polecats and stoats are also to be found in the Kellerwald. Of the 19 kinds of bat that live in Hesse, 14 have been noted in the Kellerwald. Another characteristic animal of the Kellerwald is the fire salamander, found here in its thousands. Further typical amphibians are the palmate newt and the midwife toad.

In the Kellerwald-Edersee National Park, almost a thousand kinds of beetle from more than 80 families have been noted.

== Hiking ==
Through the Kellerwald run many hiking trails, among them the Kellerwaldsteig, a roughly 167 km-long loop joining mountains and places in the Kellerwald-Edersee Nature Park and the Kellerwald-Edersee National Park together. Round the Edersee has run since 2005 the 68 km-long Urwaldsteig Edersee ("Virgin Forest Trail") through the oak forests on the lake's north shore and through the Kellerwald-Edersee National Park south of the lake.

== Mountains and heights ==
The Kellerwald's lowest point is found at the edge of the Eder Valley on the outskirts of Affoldern, not far from, and below the water level of the Affolderner See (reservoir); the point is precisely 194 m above sea level. On the other hand, the Kellerwald's highest point is on the Wüstegarten (675 m above sea level).

Among the Kellerwald's and the two herein mentioned parks' best known – albeit not necessarily highest – mountains are (including the "Six Hundreders", and sorted by height):

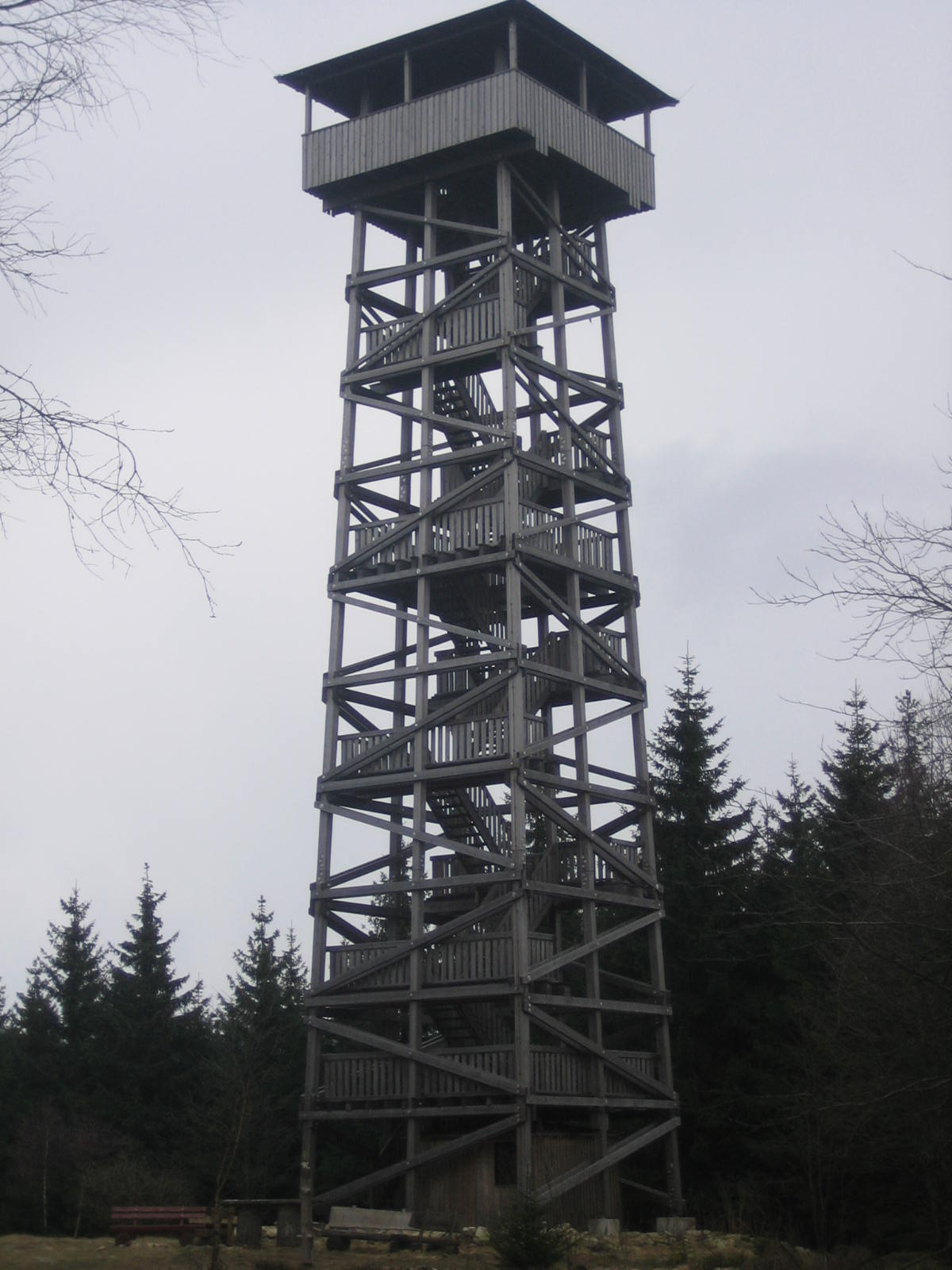
Kellerwaldturm on the Wüstegarten

- Wüstegarten (675 m) – with Kellerwaldturm
- Hohes Lohr (657 m) – with television transmitter
- Große Aschkoppe (640 m)
- Hunsrück (636 m) – foothill of Wüstegarten
- Traddelkopf (626 m)
- Winterberg (617 m) – foothill of Gr. Aschkoppe
- Auenberg (611 m)
- Kleine Aschkoppe (607 m) – foothill of Gr. Aschkoppe
- Ahornkopf (604 m) – foothill of Traddelkopf
- Dicker Kopf (604 m)
- Jeust (585 m)
- Talgang (566 m) – with nearby, former Quernst Church
- Ermerod / Peterskopf (ca. 540 m / 507 m) – with two high reservoirs
- Homberg (518 m) – with lookout tower

This German article includes a much more exhaustive list of the Kellerwald's notable peaks.

== Bodies of water ==
The Kellerwald is crossed or touched by many watercourses, among them:

- Eder
- Gilsa
- Schwalm
- Urff
- Wesebach
- Wilde
- Wohra

On the Kellerwald's northern edge lie these still, open bodies of water:

- Edersee
- Affolderner See

Both are man-made.

== Sundry ==
Kellerwald is also the name of a much smaller wood in Forchheim in Upper Franconia.
