= Bad Wildungen =

- Town
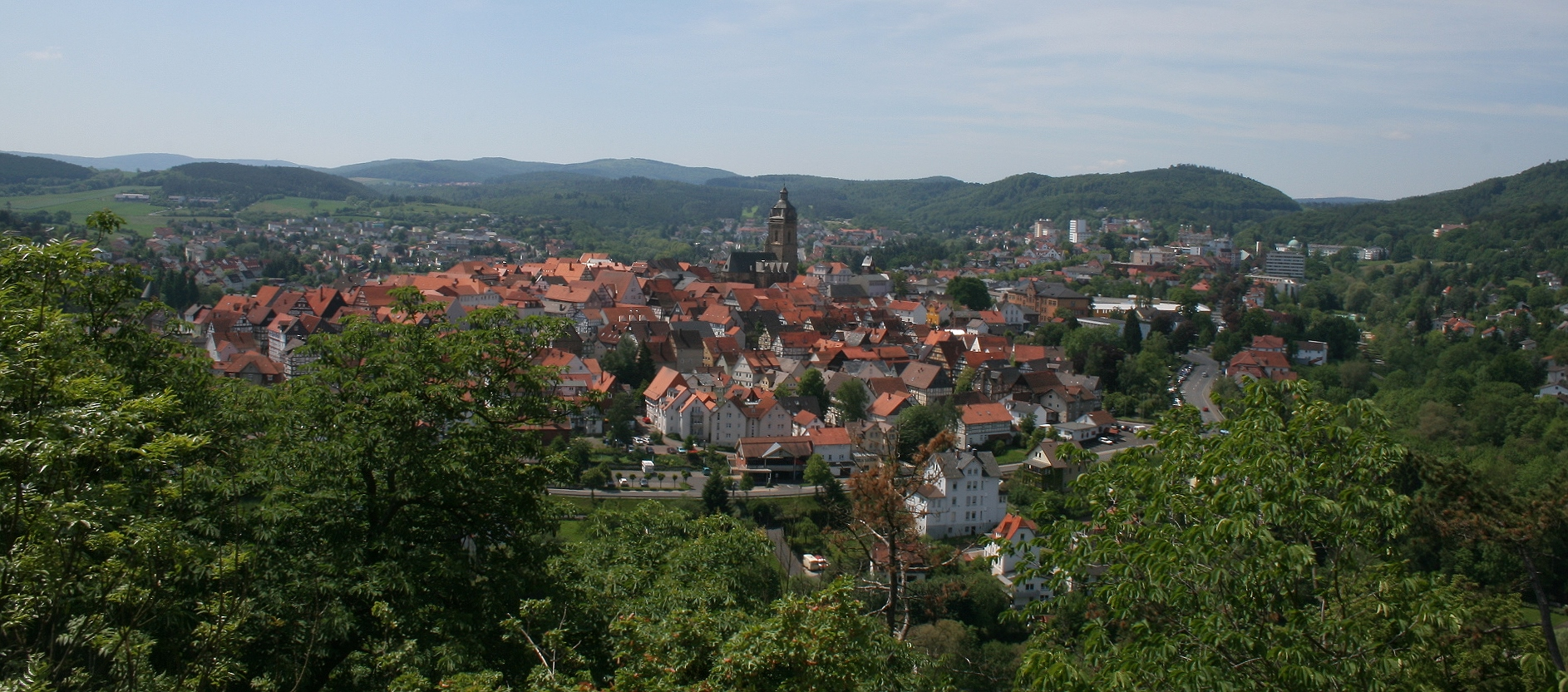
- Overlooking the town

- Flag Coat of arms

- Location of Bad Wildungen within Waldeck-Frankenberg district
- Interactive map of Bad Wildungen
- Location within Germany Location within Hesse
- Coordinates: 51°07′N 09°07′E
- Country: Germany
- State: Hesse
- Admin. region: Kassel
- District: Waldeck-Frankenberg
- Subdivisions: 13 Stadtteile

Government
  - Mayor (2018–24): Ralf Gutheil (SPD)

Area
  - Total: 120.1 km^{2} (46.4 sq mi)
- Elevation: 275 m (902 ft)

Population (2025-12-31)
  - Total: 17,404
  - Density: 144.9/km^{2} (375.3/sq mi)
- Time zone: UTC+01:00 (CET)
  - Summer (DST): UTC+02:00 (CEST)
- Postal codes: 34537
- Dialling codes: 05621
- Vehicle registration: KB, WA
- Website: www.bad-wildungen.de

Bad Wildungen (German pronunciation: [baːt ˈvɪldʊŋən]) is a state-run spa and a small town in Waldeck-Frankenberg district in Hesse, Germany. It is located on the German Timber-Frame Road.

== Geography ==
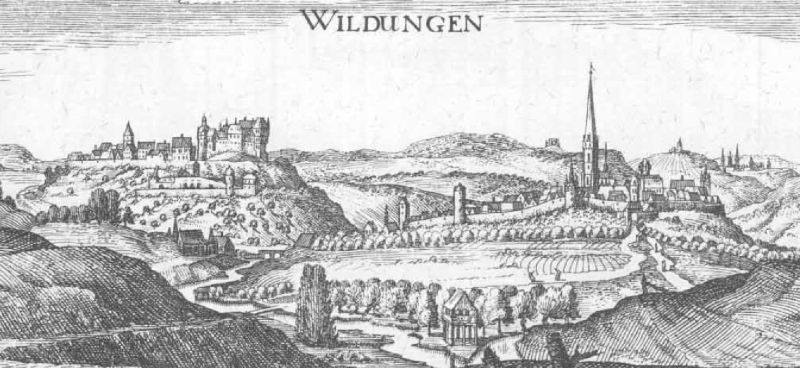
A drawing of Bad Wildungen by Matthäus Merian, 1655

=== Location ===
Bad Wildungen lies in the eastern foothills of the Kellerwald range in the so-called Waldeck holiday region, 11 km west of Fritzlar, and 35 km southwest of Kassel. The town, which spreads out east of the Homberg, is crossed by the river Wilde, which empties into the Eder at the constituent municipality of Wega. The constituent municipalities of Wega and Mandern lie on the Eder, on which also lies the Edersee, a reservoir lying only about 10 km northwest (in a straight line) of the main town of Bad Wildungen. The river Urff flows through the southwest constituent municipalities of Hundsdorf, Armsfeld and Bergfreiheit.

The nearest large towns are Kassel (about 35 km; northeast), Marburg (about 60 km; southwest) and Korbach (about 28 km; northwest).

=== Neighbouring municipalities ===
Bad Wildungen borders in the north on the municipality of Edertal (Waldeck-Frankenberg), in the east on the town of Fritzlar, in the southeast on the town of Bad Zwesten (both in the Schwalm-Eder-Kreis), in the south on the municipality of Haina, and in the west on the town of Frankenau (both in Waldeck-Frankenberg).

=== Constituent municipalities ===
Besides the main town, which bears the same name as the whole, the town of Bad Wildungen consists of the centres of Albertshausen, Armsfeld, Bergfreiheit, Braunau, Frebershausen, Hüddingen, Hundsdorf, Mandern, Odershausen, Reinhardshausen and Wega.

== History ==
Bad Wildungen's first documentary mention came about 800 AD from the Hersfeld Monastery's goods directory under the Latin name "villa Wildungun". This place lay in the Wilde Valley, east of today's main town. About 1200, a castle was built by the Thuringian Landgraves, around which Alt-Wildungen ("High Wildungen") (from lat. altus = high) developed. In 1242, Nieder-Wildungen ("Lower Wildungen"), which had been founded on the hill facing the castle, was granted town rights. From 1263, the castle and the two Wildungen towns were owned by the Counts – later Princes – of Waldeck, who only abdicated after the First World War (see Principality of Waldeck). In 1358, the two Wildungen towns were mentioned.

In 1906, the town of Nieder-Wildungen was given the new name Bad Wildungen because of its bath. In 1940, Bad Wildungen was given the title of "Preußisches Staatsbad" ("Prussian State Bath").

According to the documentary "The End of the War in Colour", Bad Wildungen was one of the rare smattering of German towns that survived WWII relatively unscathed.

=== Witch trials ===
In the time when alleged witches were persecuted, 78 people in Bad Wildungen fell victim to witch trials. At the time, Wildungen had 1200 inhabitants. The persecution came in waves of trials: 1532, 1629 to 1631 and 1650 to 1664.

- 1532 First witch trial against Gertraud Muck
- 1575 - 1578 Persecution of "witches"
- 1629 Onset of a period of unheard-of persecution: 29 victims up to 1632.
- 1650 - 1664 a further 38 victims
- 1630 Maria Rörig steadfastly withstood torture from September 1630 to May 1631: "Dear God received her in prison, to Him she would remain faithful, she is innocent like Jesus Christ." Count Christian ordered her release.
- 1656 Trial against Susanne Weber (Maria Rörig's daughter): "Her husband asks that the trial be sped up owing to the costs."

=== Amalgamations ===
The neighbouring municipalities of Alt-Wildungen, Reitzenhagen and Reinhardshausen were amalgamated in 1940. As part of municipal reform, the same was done in 1971 with Albertshausen, Armsfeld, Bergfreiheit, Braunau, Frebershausen, Hüddingen, Hundsdorf, Mandern, Odershausen and Wega.

== Politics ==
=== Town council ===
The town council's 37 seats are apportioned thus, pursuant to municipal elections held on March 15, 2026:

CDU	13 seats
SPD	8 seats
FDP	1 seats
FWG	2 seats
Greens	5 seats
Left Party	1 seat

The town executive (Magistrat) consists of the mayor and ten town councillors. Following the 2021 municipal elections and subsequent updates, these seats are distributed directly among the parties: four seats are held by the CDU, three by the SPD, and one each by Bündnis 90/Die Grünen, the FREIE WÄHLER (FWG), and the FDP.

=== Mayors ===
At the mayoral election in 2006, the FDP's Volker Zimmermann was elected Bad Wildungen's new mayor with a 58% share of the vote in a run-off. He took over as mayor from his predecessor Reinhard Grieneisen (CDU) on 1 September 2006.

In 2018 Ralf Gutheil (SPD) was elected, as the new mayor of Bad Wildungen. He replaced Volker Zimmermann who held the office since. Gutheil was subsequently re-elected for a second term in March 2024.

=== Coat of arms ===
Bad Wildungen's civic coat of arms is heraldically described as: Sable an eight-pointed mullet Or.

Bad Wildungen's earliest known town seal was quite different, dating from 1258 and showing the Count of Thuringia – then the local overlord – astride a steed and kitted out as a knight. The current charge, which is based on the Star of Waldeck, is first known to have appeared in 1262. Some later seals also show a woman in the foot of the shield. The arms appeared with or without the woman over the centuries. In the 18th century, the colours were reversed – the arms were originally Or an eight-pointed mullet Sable – to difference the town's arms from the arms of Waldeck.

=== Town partnerships ===
Bad Wildungen maintains partnership links with the following:

- Saffron Walden, Essex, United Kingdom since 1986,
- Yichun, Heilongjiang, China since 1988
- Saint-Jean-de-Maurienne, département of Savoie in France since 1990.

== Culture and sightseeing ==
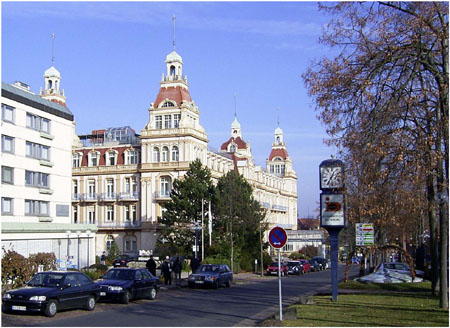
Bad Wildungen

=== Museums ===
Much that there is to know about the region lies waiting to be discovered in the Quellenmuseum ("Spa Museum"), the Heimatmuseum (local history museum), the Museum for Military and Hunting History of the Kassel State Museums (Museum für Militär und Jagdgeschichte der Staatlichen Museen Kassel) at Schloss Friedrichstein (a stately home – see below) and the museum at the former mining office and Bertsch visitors' mine.

Interested visitors should also have a look at the "Living Museum" in Odershausen, the Lapidarium (mineral display in Schloss Friedrichstein's basement vault) and the "Galerie am Kump" in Albertshausen.

=== Theatre ===
Theatric productions are performed at the Kurhaus Bad Wildungen (Bad Wildungen Spa House).

=== Music ===
Music can be experienced, among other ways, by attending a chamber concert at Schloss Friedrichstein, or going to the Wildungen Music Workshop (Wildunger Musik-Werkstatt), a generation-spanning choir. Furthermore, classical, jazz, samba and folk concerts or festivals regularly take place at the Kurhaus and the Schloss.

=== Other events ===
In 2006, the third Hessian State Garden Show took place in the town.

There is a weekly country market in Bad Wildungen. Furthermore, there is a regularly held jazz festival in June, and mid-July brings Kram- und Viehmarkt – a fair with household goods and cattle markets. December is the time for a Christmas market. In September, there is either a samba festival or a flower parade.

=== Buildings ===
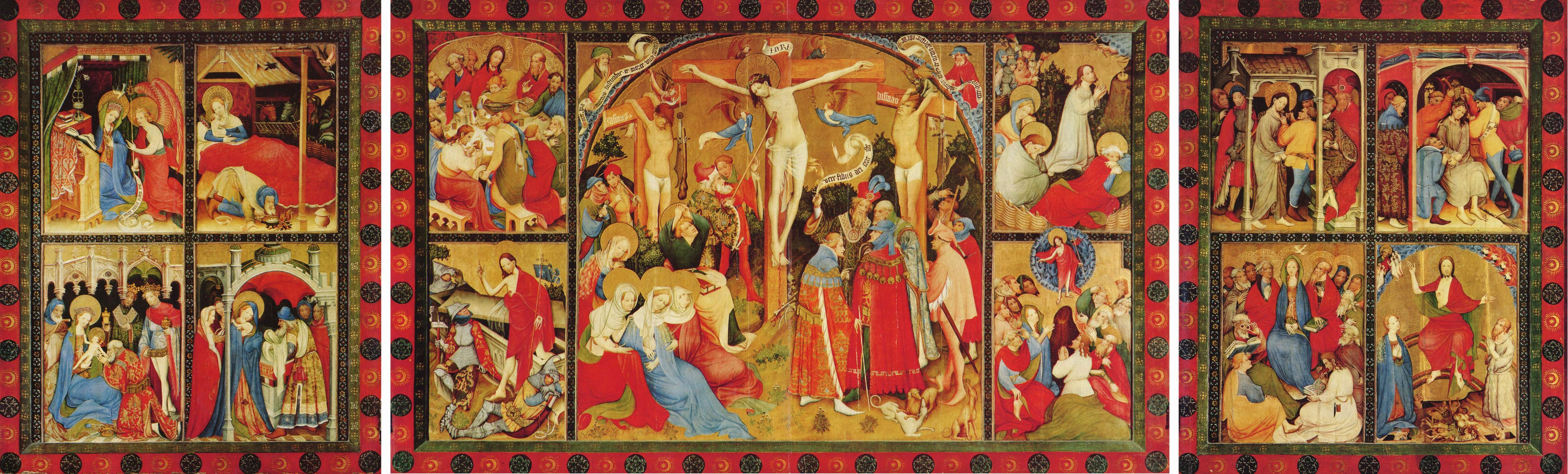
Altarpiece of Konrad von Soest in the Evangelical Church

Above Bad Wildungen stands a Baroque stately home, Schloss Friedrichstein, which was planned by Count Josias II in 1660 and completed between 1707 and 1714 by Prince Friedrich Anton Ulrich zu Waldeck. In the centre stands a late Gothic Evangelical town church from the 14th century. Inside is a winged altarpiece by Konrad von Soest (with Germany's oldest depiction of eyeglasses). Furthermore, standing in the town centre and along the Brunnenallee are many villas from the founders' times. The Fürstenhof, an Art Nouveau building like a stately home, once a hotel (the biggest Art Nouveau building in Europe) is today a clinic.

=== Parks ===
==== Europe's biggest spa park ====
In the late 1990s, the Bad Wildungen spa park was connected by a "green bridge" – not natural but made to seem so – to the Reinhardshausen spa park, making one large park now regarded, at 50 ha, as Europe's biggest spa park.

=== Natural monuments ===
In the Helenental foothills are found the Odershausen Waterfalls, which are well worth seeing. Furthermore, in the woods near Odershausen, near the Jägersburg ("Hunter's Castle"), stand three old dwarf beeches.

Also, the Bilstein Cliffs near Reizenhagen tempt climbers. Bad Wildungen's local mountain, the 518 m-high Homberg, affords the visitor an outstanding panoramic view.

The municipal area's highest mountain, however, is the Wüstegarten (675 m above sea level), located near Bergfreiheit, one of Bad Wildungen's outlying municipalities. It is disputed as to whether the peak is actually in Bad Wildungen, as the latest survey suggests that it is a few metres outside town limits.

Das Paradies ("The Paradise") near Albertshausen is not simply called this; hikers will also find this unique forest towards Gellershausen and Kleinern to be something of a paradisiacal treasure.

The 167 km-long Kellerwaldsteig, awarded with the distinction of one of Germany's three finest hiking trails, begins and ends in Bad Wildungen.

In the former Hutewald (forest used for grazing) of Halloh in Albertshausen is a centuries-old beech forest.

=== Sport ===
In Bad Wildungen there are two sport clubs, the VFL Bad Wildungen (VFL = Verein für Leibesübungen – club for bodily exercise) and the TV Friedrichstein (TV = Turnverein – gymnastic club). Both clubs have established football and handball associations.

Bad Wildungen is also the host to the German amateur snooker championship which is the highest ranking amateur snooker event in Germany.

=== Culinary specialities ===
One Waldeck speciality is Schepperlinge, a kind of potato pancake, traditionally served in Bad Wildungen with bacon, onions and black coffee.

As is true more or less throughout northern Hesse, the so-called "Ahle Worscht" is an ever-popular dish. The name is Hessian dialect for alte Wurst – "old sausage".

== Economy and infrastructure ==
The town's main field of economic activity is the spa and tourism business. Bad Wildungen is, however, slowly developing into an educational centre. The Holzfachschule, the clinics' nursing schools, the Bringmann Academy, the Bildungszentrum Handel und Dienstleistungen e. V. (Handel Education Centre and Services) and the Berufsakademie Nordhessen (North Hesse Professional Academy) support this endeavour.

=== Transport ===
Through the municipal area run the Federal Highways (Bundesstraßen) B 485 and B 253, which afford a connection to the Autobahn A 49. Bad Wildungen can be reached by regional rail services (NVV) from Kassel and Wabern, terminating at Bad Wildungen station. The city also maintains a bus service, the BKW (Bad Wildunger Kraftwagenverkehrs- und Wasserversorgungsgesellschaft mbH), which is also responsible for the municipal water supply.

=== Media ===
The regional daily newspapers are the Waldeckische Landeszeitung and the Waldeckische Allgemeine, a local edition of the Hessisch-Niedersächsische-Allgemeine.

=== Spa ===
Wildungen is a therapeutic spa with springs that bring forth water containing iron, magnesium and carbonic acid ("sparkling" or "carbonated").

The times when visitors would "partake of the waters" are somewhat bygone now. More at the fore of medical rehabilitation nowadays are orthopaedics, psychosomatic illness treatment, internal medicine, rheumatology, neurology, oncology and urology. Institutions for gerontological care (retirement homes, nursing homes) are also important services.

The yearly number of overnight stays in Bad Wildungen is roughly 1.4 million (2002), making Bad Wildungen second only to Frankfurt among Hessian towns and cities with the most overnight stays.

=== Education ===
In Bad Wildungen, alongside several primary schools are a school for students with learning difficulties (Mathias-Bauer-Schule), a Hauptschule-Realschule (Ense-Schule) and a Gymnasium (Gustav-Stresemann-Gymnasium). Vocational education is done through the Hans-Viessmann-Schule.

The Berufsakademie Bad Wildungen offers the choice of a dual course of study alternating between theoretical and practical phases. Among the subjects offered are computer science and tourism.

=== Firefighting ===
Bad Wildungen maintains a voluntary fire department, as do all of its villages, except for Albertshausen. Hüddingen and Frebershausen maintain a joint fire department.

== Personalities ==
=== Sons and daughters of the town ===
- Wilhelm Dilich (but possibly born in Wabern), engraver
- Ludwig Wolff (1892–1975), German scholar
- Gerhard Schröder (television executive) (1921–2012), broadcasting director
- Wolfgang Roth (born 1939), psychologist
- Renate Blume (born 1944 in Bad Wildungen), German actress
- Pantha du Prince (born 1975), techno musician, composer and conceptual artist
- Carolin Schäfer (born 1991), German heptathlete

=== Other persons connected with the town ===
- Philipp Nicolai (born 1556 in Bad Arolsen-Mengeringhausen, died 26 October 1608 in Hamburg), songwriter and Lutheran court chaplain in Alt-Wildungen.
- Master of the Netz Altar Triptych, (14th century), Gothic painter
- Christoph Scheibler, philosopher and theologian
- Emil Jannings (born July 23, 1884, in Rorschach; † 2 January 1950 in Strobl), actor ("The Blue Angel")
- Hans-Jürgen von Arnim, (1889–1962) general and last Afrika Korps' commander died in Bad Wildungen.
- Gerhard Franz (born February 26, 1902, in Bobeck, Thuringia; † December 24, 1975 in Bad Wildungen), Major General

The Wildunger Kurmuseum lists the town's many doctors, some of whom have become world-famous.

== Twin towns ==
Bad Wildungen is twinned with the English town of Saffron Walden in the county of Essex.
