= Gilsa =

Gilsa may refer to:

- Gilsa (Schwalm), a river of Hesse, Germany, tributary of the Schwalm
- Leopold von Gilsa (died 1870), career soldier who served in the armies of Prussia and the United States
- Werner von Gilsa (1889–1945), German general during World War II
