= Wüstegarten =

Mountain in Germany

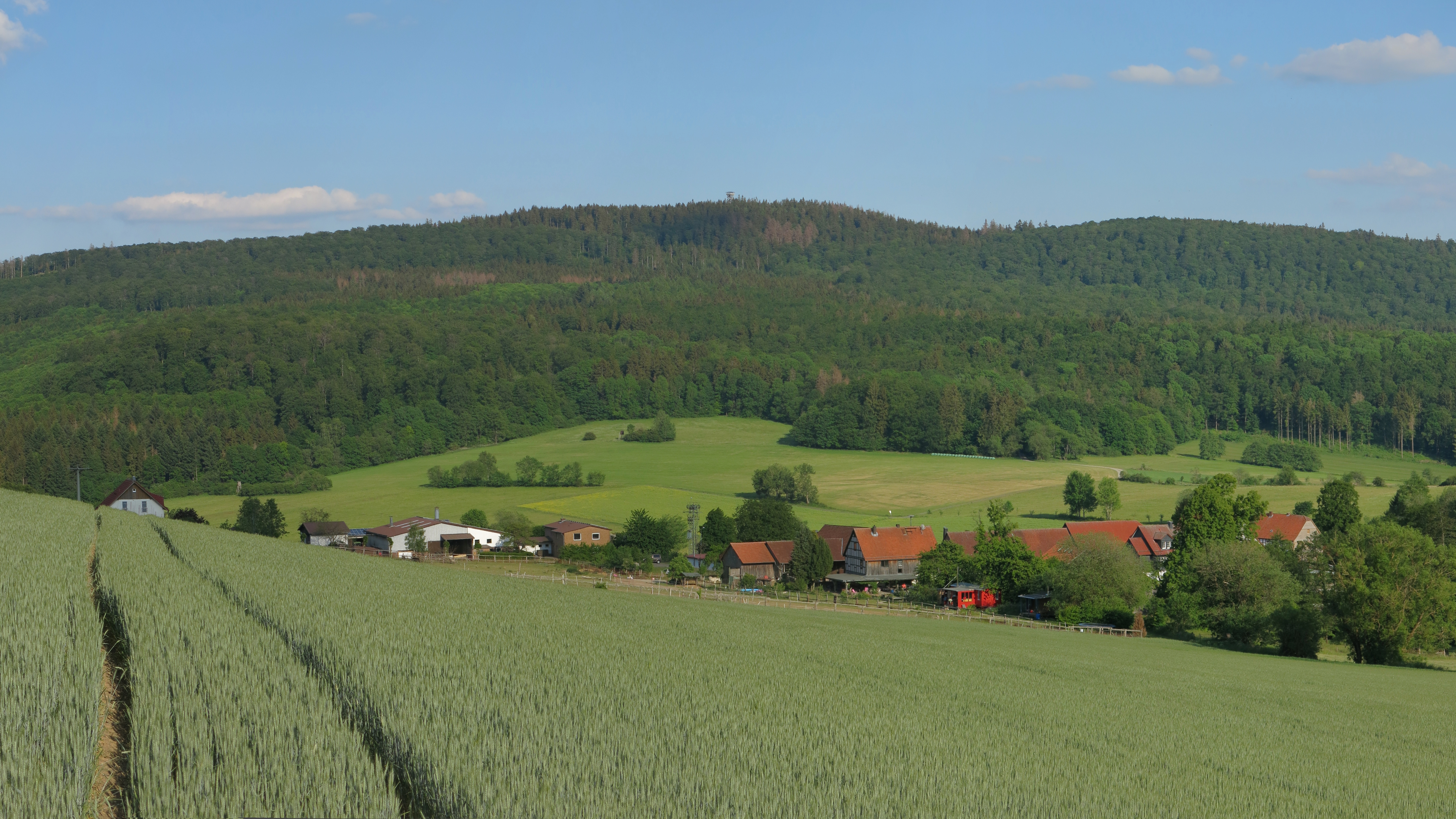
- Wüstegarten seen from the west

Highest point
- Elevation: 675.3 m (2,216 ft)
- Coordinates: 51°00′59″N 09°05′03″E

Geography
- Location: Landkreis Waldeck-Frankenberg and Schwalm-Eder-Kreis (districts), Hesse, Germany
- Parent range: Kellerwald

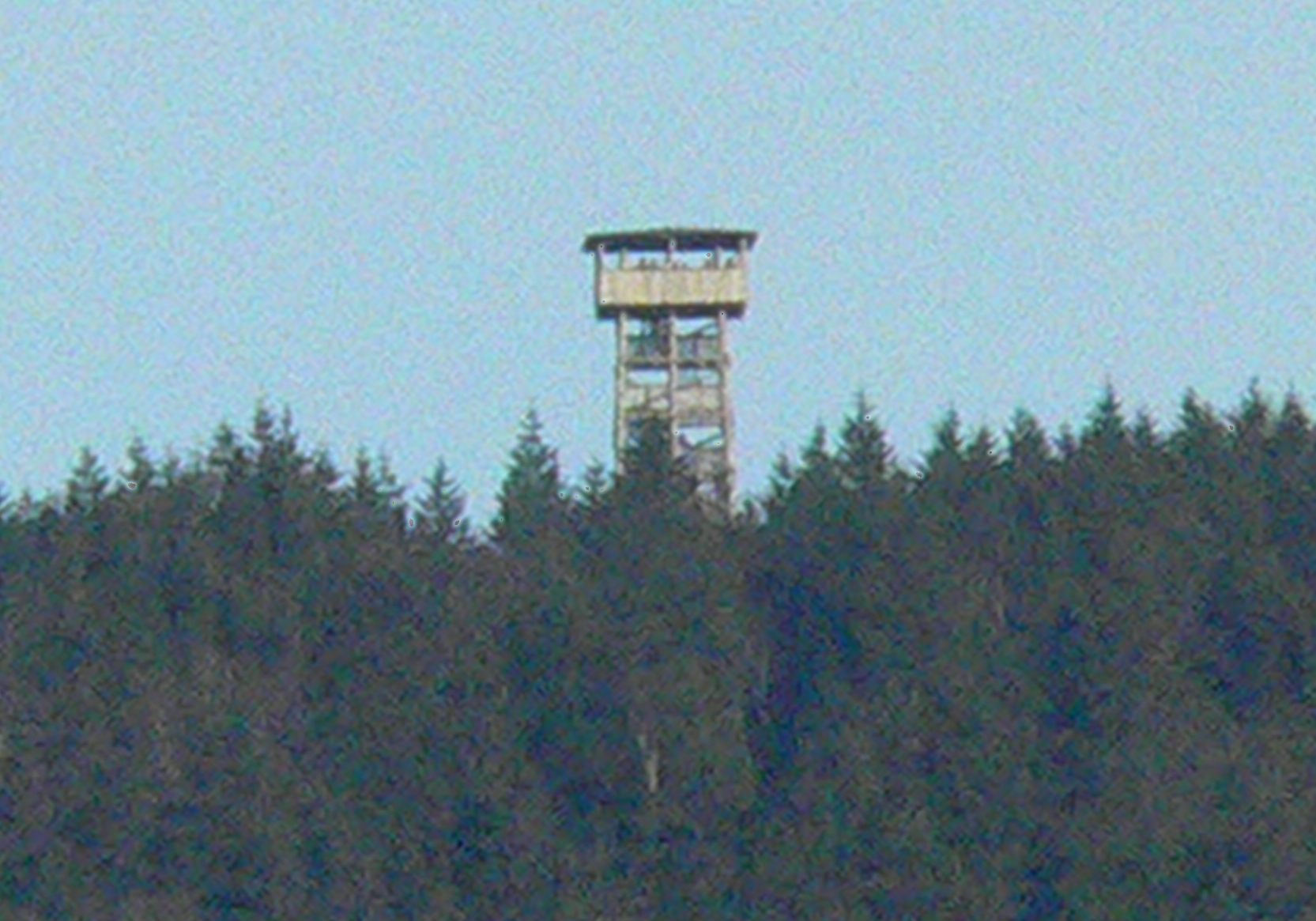
Forest and lookout tower on the mountain

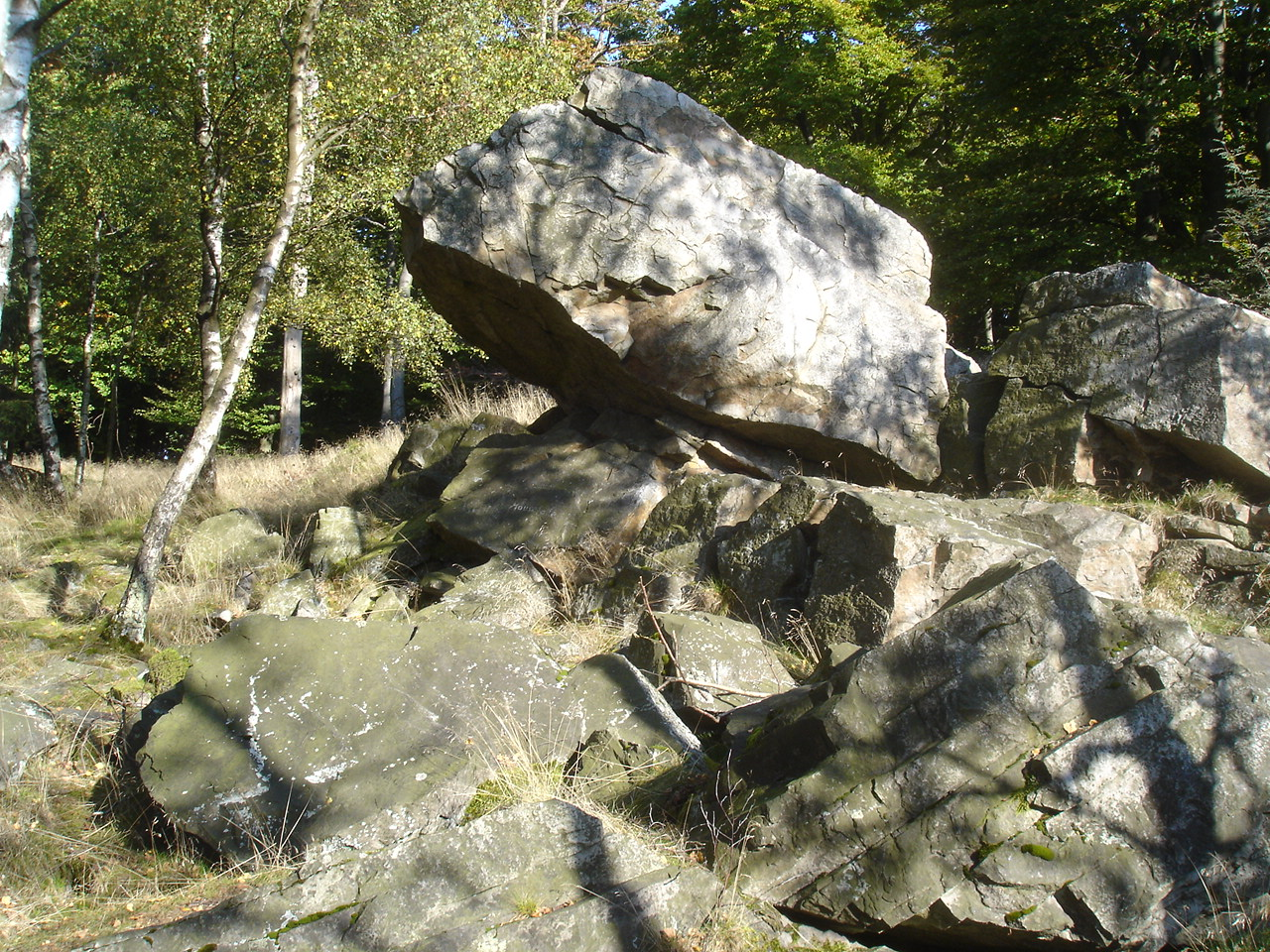
Rock outcroppings and native vegetation of Wüstegarten.

Wüstegarten is a mountain in the counties of Waldeck-Frankenberg and Schwalm-Eder-Kreis in the north of the German state of Hesse. It is in the Kellerwald mountains and has an elevation of 675.3 metres (2,216 ft).

The mountain is within the Kellerwald-Edersee National Park, Hesse's only national park. Activities include hiking, Nordic walking, mountain biking, and cross-country skiing.

== See also ==
- List of mountains of Hesse
