= Kellerwald-Edersee National Park =

National Park in Northern Hesse, Germany

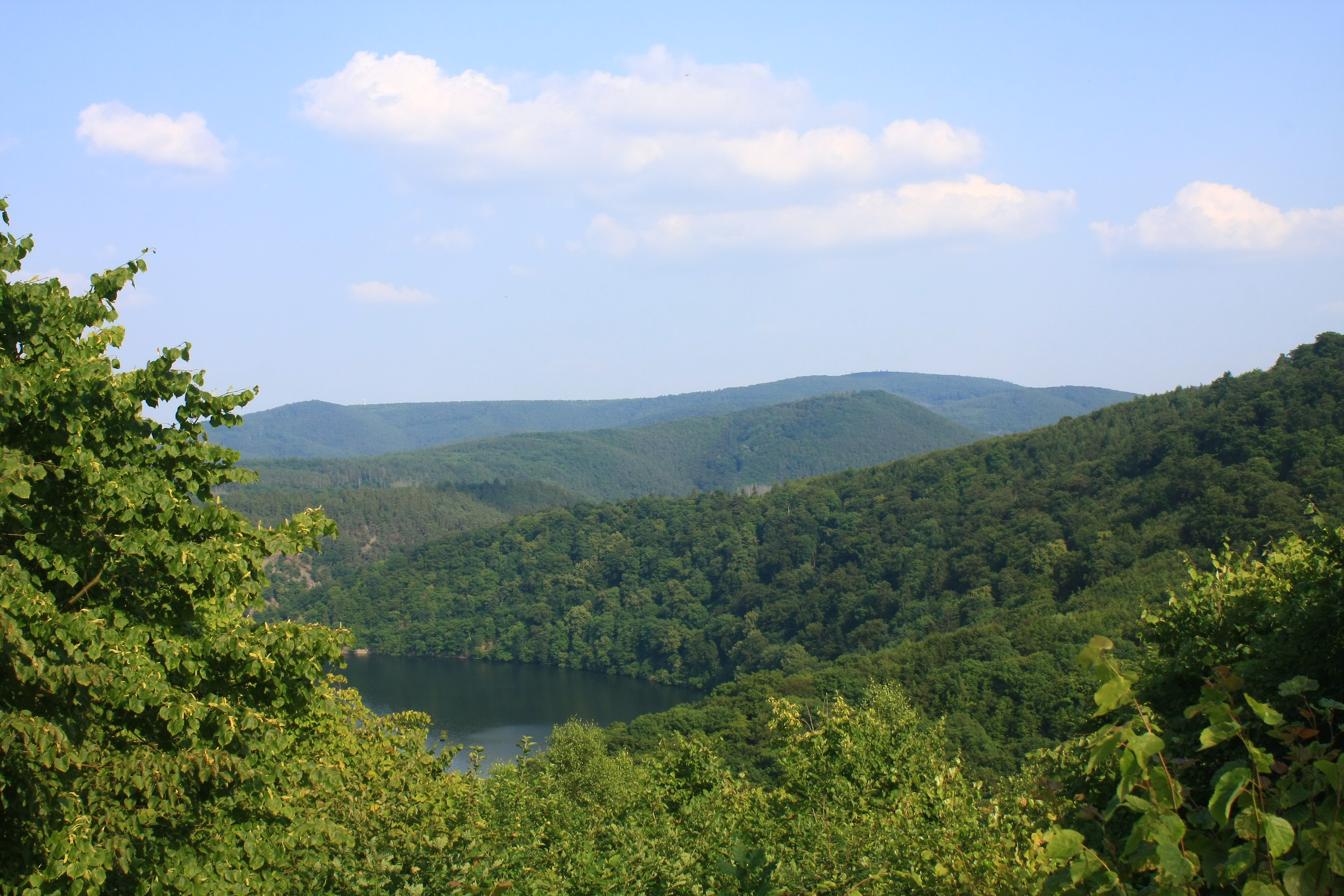
- View from the Ringelsberg near Asel-Süd over part of the Edersee looking east-southeast to the Kellerwald-Edersee NP and the Dicker Kopf

- Location within Germany
- Location: Webseite des Nationalparks; Nationalpark Kellerwald-Edersee; Laustr. 8 D–34537 Bad Wildungen
- Nearest city: Bad Wildungen, Frankenau, Frankenberg, Fritzlar, Korbach, Waldeck
- Coordinates: 51.166°N 9.0°E
- Area: 57.38 km^{2} (22.15 sq mi)
- Designation: Rotbuchenwälder
- Established: 1 January 2004

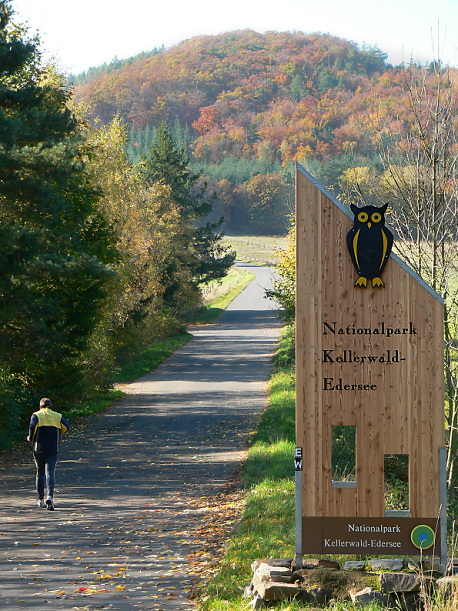
National park sign near Hemfurth-Edersee

Kellerwald-Edersee National Park (German: Nationalpark Kellerwald-Edersee), CDDA-No. 318077) in the North Hessian county of Waldeck-Frankenberg is a national park, 57.38 km² in area, that lies south of the Edersee lake in the northern part of the Kellerwald low mountain range in the German state of Hesse. Since 25 June 2011 the beech forested area of the national park has been part of the UNESCO World Heritage Site known as Ancient and Primeval Beech Forests of the Carpathians and Other Regions of Europe, because of its testimony to the ecological history of the beech family and the forest dynamics of Europe since the Last Glacial Period.

The national park administration is located in the small town of Bad Wildungen, east of the park.

== Literature ==
- Norbert Panek (2006), Urwald-Ängste. Der beschwerliche Weg zum Nationalpark "Kellerwald". Idee, Konzept, Entstehungsgeschichte (in German), Korbach: Selbstverlag, ISBN 978-3-00-020673-3
- Norbert Panek (2006), Nationalpark-Region Kellerwald-Edersee. Mit Kellerwaldsteig (in German), Niedenstein: Cognito, ISBN 978-3-932583-21-6
- Manfred Delpho; Wolfgang Lübcke (2006), Im Reich der urigen Buchen. Nationalpark Kellerwald-Edersee (in German), Niedenstein: Cognitio, ISBN 978-3-932583-18-6
- Hugo Hücker; Gerhard Kalden (2004), Naturpark und Nationalpark Kellerwald-Edersee. Faszination Natur (in German), Niedenstein: Cognitio, ISBN 3-932583-12-4

Edersee Game Park The Edersee game park is home to wildlife species from the local forests as well as species that used to inhabit our landscape, but no longer do so. Amidst the WildtierPark game park is the bird of prey station. There you can experience eagle owls, hawks, red kites, stone and imperial eagles close-up.

== Film ==
- Im Nationalpark Kellerwald-Edersee, documentary, 45 minutes, Germany, 2005, Buch und Regie: Ina Knobloch, Manfred Praxl und Hiltrud Jäschke, Produktion: MDR
