= Jesberg =

- Municipality
- Flag Coat of arms

- Location of Jesberg within Schwalm-Eder-Kreis district
- Interactive map of Jesberg
- Location within Germany Location within Hesse
- Coordinates: 51°00′N 09°09′E
- Country: Germany
- State: Hesse
- Admin. region: Kassel
- District: Schwalm-Eder-Kreis
- Subdivisions: 5 Ortsteile

Government
  - Mayor (2017–23): Heiko Manz (SPD)

Area
  - Total: 49.77 km^{2} (19.22 sq mi)
- Elevation: 250 m (820 ft)

Population (2025-12-31)
  - Total: 2,105
  - Density: 42.29/km^{2} (109.5/sq mi)
- Time zone: UTC+01:00 (CET)
  - Summer (DST): UTC+02:00 (CEST)
- Postal codes: 34632
- Dialling codes: 06695
- Vehicle registration: HR

Jesberg is a municipality in the Schwalm-Eder district in Hesse, Germany.

== Geography ==
=== Location ===
Jesberg lies from 210 to 675 m high in the Gilsa river valley east-southeast of the Wüstegarten, which at 675 m above sea level is both the Kellerwald range's and the Schwalm-Eder district's highest peak. The community can be reached by Federal Highway (Bundesstraße) B 3.

=== Constituent communities ===
Jesberg consists of the following centres:

- Jesberg
- Densberg
- Hundshausen
- Elnrode-Strang
- Reptich

== History ==
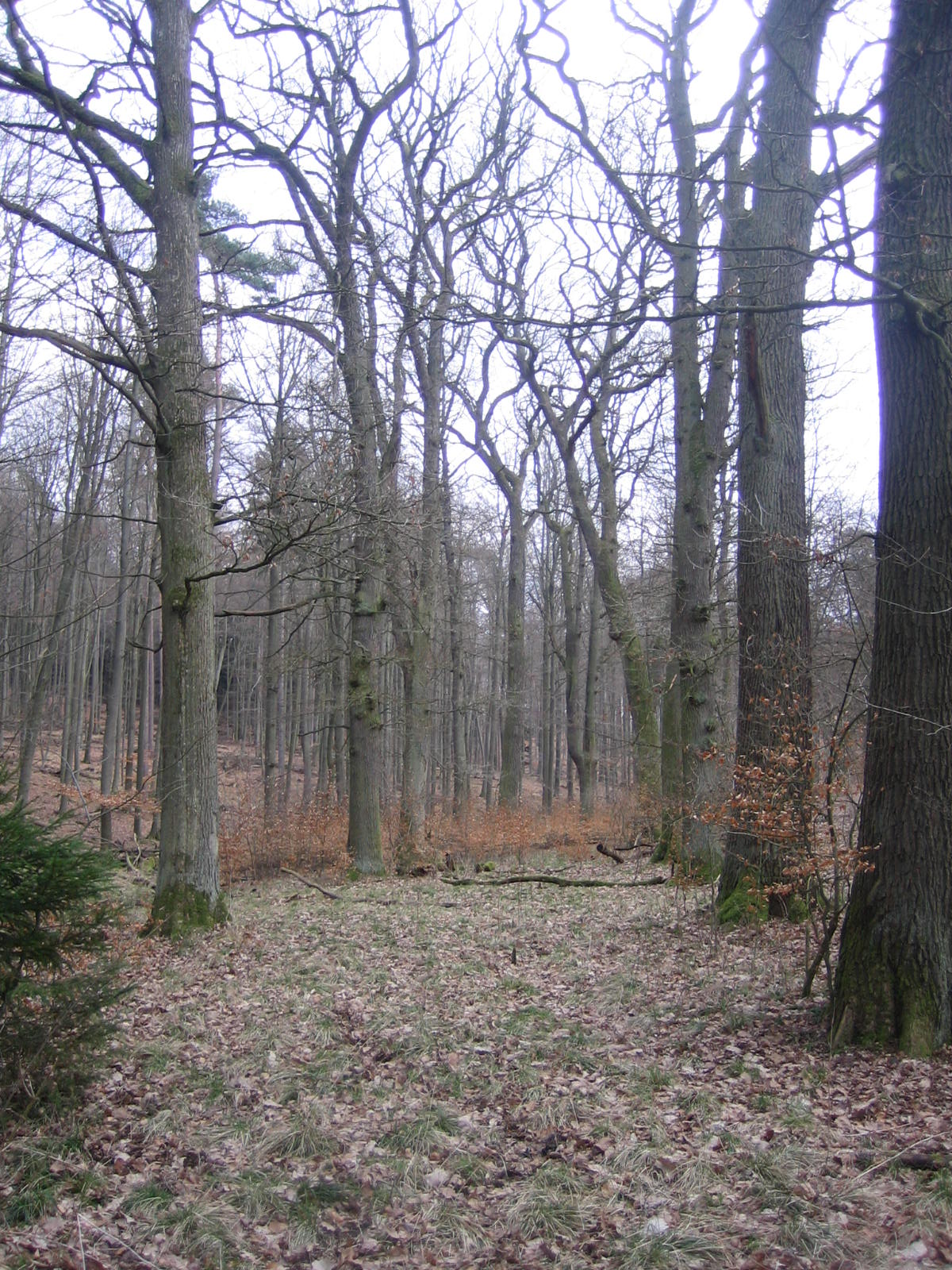
Remains of the "Oak Walk" at the Princess's Garden

The Burg Jesberg, a castle built by the noble family of Linsingen in 1241, was later sold to the Archbishopric of Mainz, and along with Naumburg and Fritzlar was one of the Archbishops' main bases in the struggle against the Landgraves of Hesse. In 1723, the Prinzessingarten — Princess's Garden — near Jesberg was built in what is now the Jesberg State Forest. It can still be seen, along with its centrepiece, the Prinzessingarten-Eiche, a big oaktree, although nowadays, little of the actual garden is still preserved.

The small Baroque stately home was built by Maximilian von Hessen, Landgrave Karl von Hessen-Kassel's son — whose four daughters also inspired the Princess's Garden — on the lands near the Treisbach (brook) in the early 18th century.

On 9 June 1922, the historian Hugo Brunner died in Jesberg.

== Politics ==
As of the municipal elections on 26 March 2006, seats on municipal council are apportioned thus:

- SPD: 8 seats
- CDU: 5 seats
- UWG: 1 seat
- Greens: 1 seat

Note: UWG is a citizens'/voters' coalition.

== Public institutions ==
There are a primary school and a library.

=== Sport and leisure facilities ===
The community has a forest lore path, a campsite, a leisure centre, two barbecue areas with barbecue huts, a heated outdoor swimming pool, a sporting ground, a wading pool, five children's playgrounds, three tennis courts, a soccer pitch, two minigolf courses and skittle alleys.
