= Hunsrück (Kellerwald) =

Mountain in Germany

Coordinates: 51°01′34″N 9°06′04″E

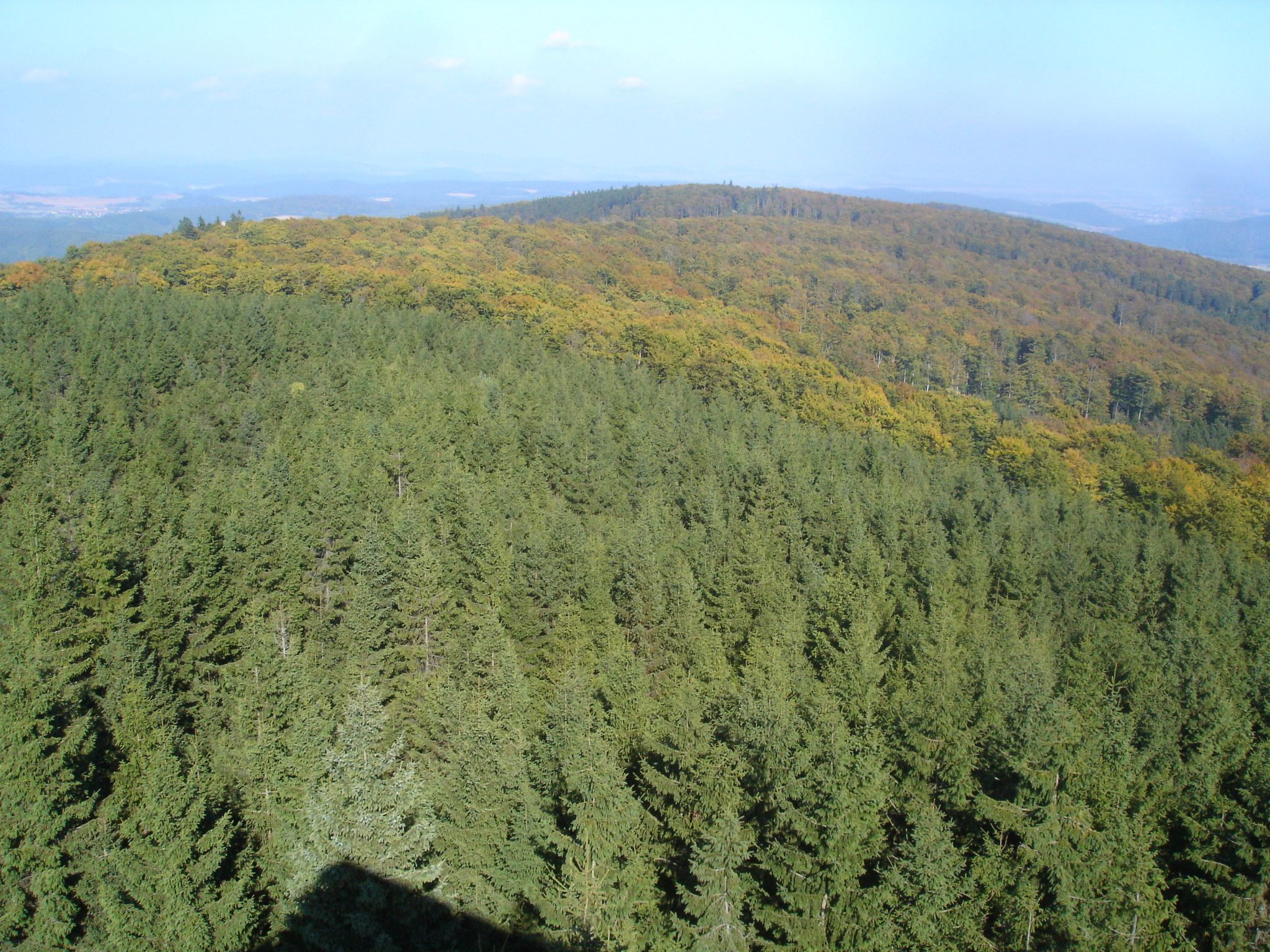

Highest point
- Elevation: 635.9 m (2,086 ft)

Geography
- Location: Schwalm-Eder-Kreis, Hesse, Germany

Hunsrück is a mountain of Schwalm-Eder-Kreis, Hesse, Germany.
