= Bad Zwesten =

- Municipality
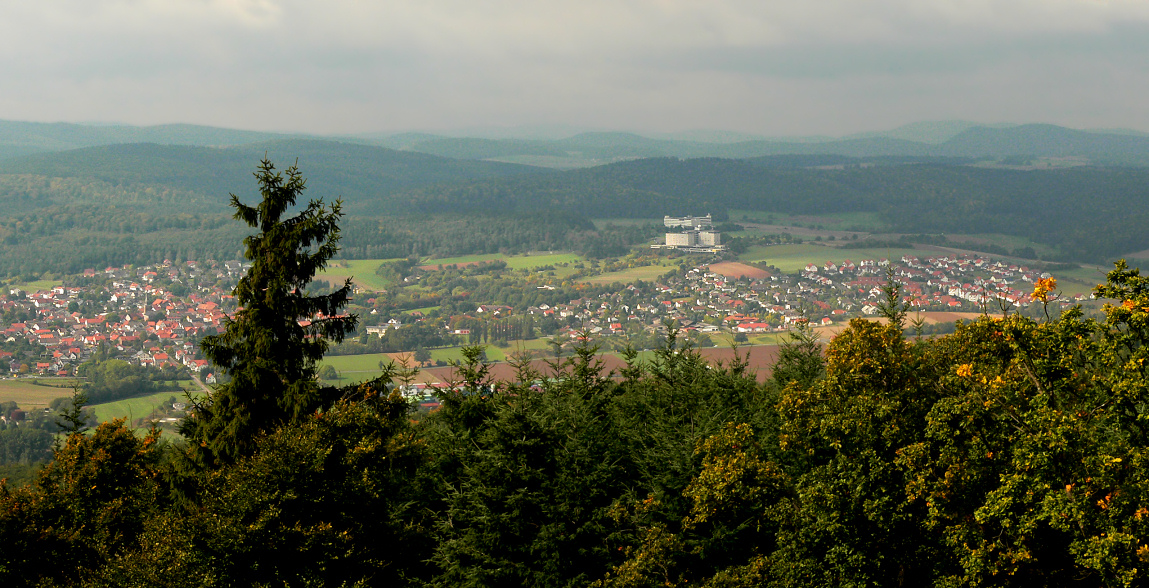
- Bad Zwesten, at right the Hardtwald Clinic

- Coat of arms

- Location of Bad Zwesten within Schwalm-Eder-Kreis district
- Interactive map of Bad Zwesten
- Location within Germany Location within Hesse
- Coordinates: 51°03′N 09°11′E
- Country: Germany
- State: Hesse
- Admin. region: Kassel
- District: Schwalm-Eder-Kreis
- Subdivisions: 5 Ortsteile

Government
  - Mayor (2023–29): Achim Siebert

Area
  - Total: 39.45 km^{2} (15.23 sq mi)
- Elevation: 210 m (690 ft)

Population (2025-12-31)
  - Total: 3,879
  - Density: 98.33/km^{2} (254.7/sq mi)
- Time zone: UTC+01:00 (CET)
  - Summer (DST): UTC+02:00 (CEST)
- Postal codes: 34596
- Dialling codes: 05626
- Vehicle registration: HR
- Website: www.badzwesten.de

Bad Zwesten is a municipality in the Schwalm-Eder district of Hesse, Germany.

== Geography ==
=== Location ===
Bad Zwesten lies about 8 km southeast of Bad Wildungen on the river Schwalm, which belongs to the Eder watershed. North of the community begins the Kellerwald-Edersee Nature Park.

=== Constituent communities ===
- Betzigerode
- Niederurff
- Oberurff-Schiffelborn
- Wenzigerode
- Zwesten (administrative seat)

== History ==
Zwesten had its first documentary mention about the year 800. In 1913 came the discovery of a mineral spring, which in 1960 was officially declared a recognized Heilquelle (≈health spring).

Within the framework of municipal reform in Hesse, the formerly independent communities of Betzigerode, Niederurff, Oberurff-Schiffelborn, Wenzigerode, and Zwesten were amalgamated into the new, united community of Zwesten in 1972. In 1992, the community was granted official recognition as a spa, allowing it to prefix the designation Bad – German for "bath" – to its name.

== Politics ==
=== Municipal council ===
Municipal representation consists of 23 members.

- CDU: 6 seats
- SPD: 10 seats
- Greens: 3 seats
- FWG (citizens' coalition): 2 seats
- Bürgerliste (citizens' coalition): 2 seats

(as of municipal elections on 26 March 2006)

== Economy ==
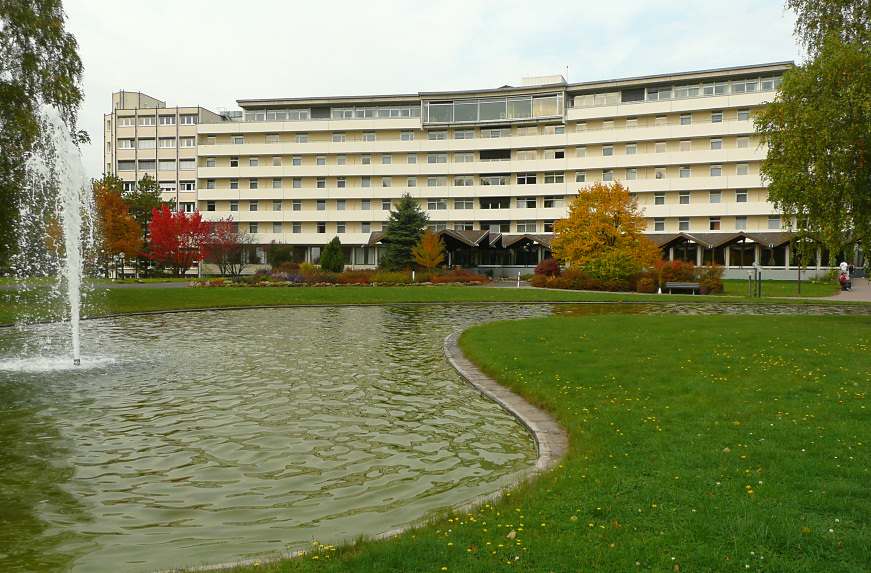
Hardtwald Clinic II above the community

The spa of Bad Zwesten bases its economy on its Löwensprudel ("Lion's Fizzy Water"). In this spa town, two clinics are to be found, Hardtwald Clinics I and II with about 650 beds.

== Transport ==
Bad Zwesten lies at the crossroads of Federal Highways (Bundesstraßen) B3 and B485. About 5 km from the community is the Borken/Bad Zwesten interchange with Autobahn A 49 (Kassel – Fritzlar – Marburg).

The community belongs to the North Hesse Transport Network (Nordhessischer Verkehrsverbund) which, among other things, runs a hailed shared taxi to Borken railway station on the Main-Weser Railway.

== Literature ==
- Martin Opfer: Zwesten : Betzigerode, Niederurff, Oberurff, Schiffelborn und Wenzigerode; Bilder und Texte erzählen, wie es damals war, Wartberg-Verlag, Gudensberg-Gleichen 1989, ISBN 3-925277-31-5
