= Frankenau =

- Town
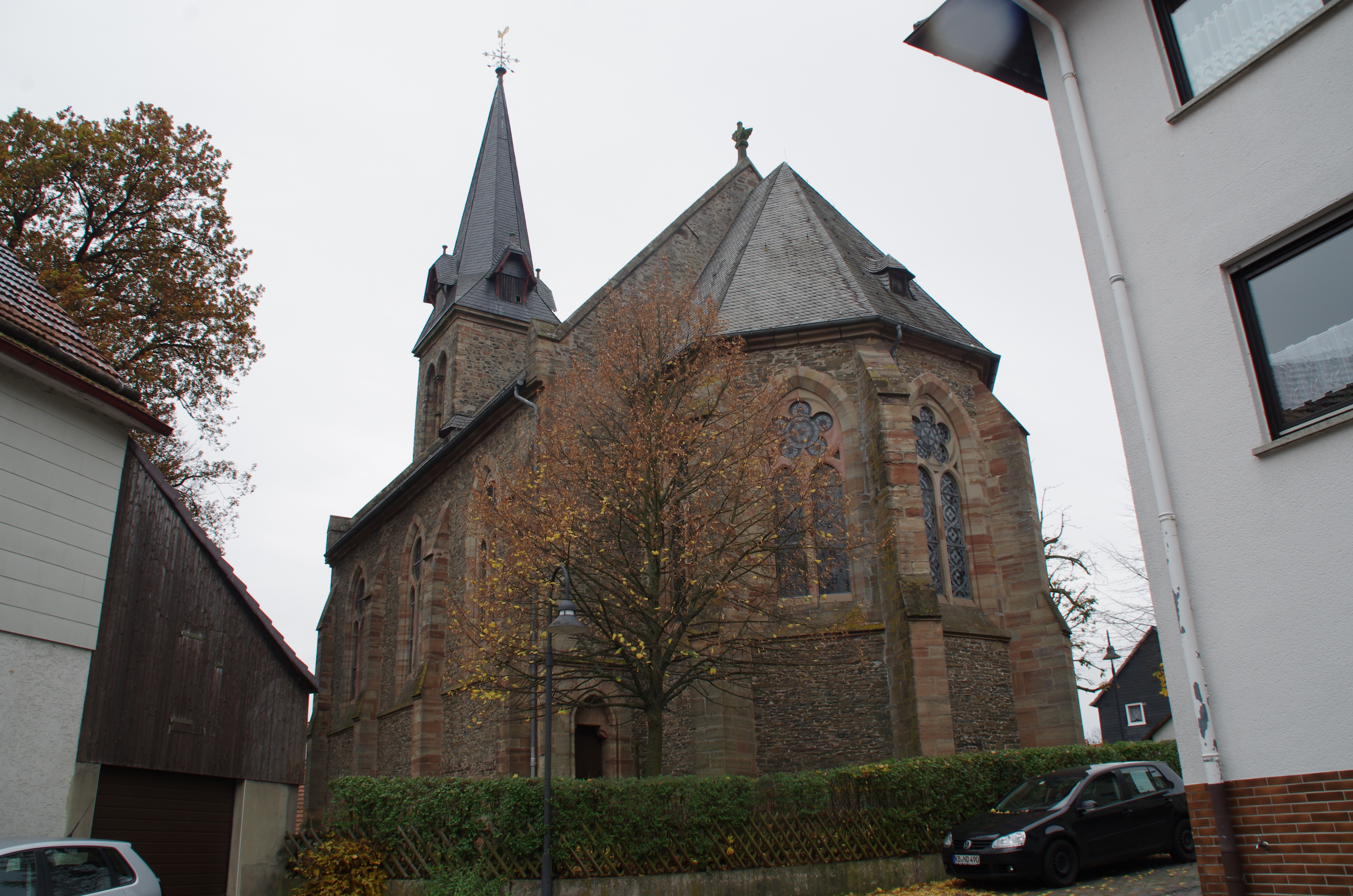
- Neo-Gothic church

- Coat of arms

- Location of Frankenau within Waldeck-Frankenberg district
- Interactive map of Frankenau
- Location within Germany Location within Hesse
- Coordinates: 51°06′N 08°56′E
- Country: Germany
- State: Hesse
- Admin. region: Kassel
- District: Waldeck-Frankenberg
- Subdivisions: 6 Stadtteile

Government
  - Mayor (2021–27): Manuel Steiner

Area
  - Total: 57.29 km^{2} (22.12 sq mi)
- Elevation: 430 m (1,410 ft)

Population (2025-12-31)
  - Total: 2,718
  - Density: 47.44/km^{2} (122.9/sq mi)
- Time zone: UTC+01:00 (CET)
  - Summer (DST): UTC+02:00 (CEST)
- Postal codes: 35109–35110
- Dialling codes: 06455
- Vehicle registration: KB
- Website: www.frankenau.de

Frankenau (German pronunciation: [ˈfʁaŋkənaʊ]) is a small town in Waldeck-Frankenberg district in Hesse, Germany.

== Geography ==
=== Location ===
Frankenau lies in the Kellerwald range southwest of the Talgang (566 m-high mountain). It is found on the southern edge of the Kellerwald-Edersee National Park on the upper reaches of the Lorfebach, a tributary to the Eder. Frankenau lies 10 km east of Frankenberg, and 33 km northeast of Marburg.

=== Neighbouring municipalities ===
Frankenau borders in the north on the municipality of Vöhl, in the east on the municipality of Edertal and the town of Bad Wildungen, in the south on the municipality of Haina, and in the west on the town of Frankenberg (all in Waldeck-Frankenberg).

=== Constituent municipalities ===
The town of Frankenau consists of the centres of Allendorf, Altenlotheim, Dainrode, Ellershausen and Louisendorf.

== History ==
Frankenau and its neighbouring town Frankenberg are believed to have come into being in Frankish times. The area was settled at one time by the Chatti. The actual place Frankenau was built as a border fortification against the Saxons. The town's founding is assumed to have taken place between 500 and 750, with town rights later being granted by Heinrich Raspe, Landgrave of Thuringia, in 1242.

The oldest surviving document about Frankenau was issued on 4 April 1266 and affirms the granting of town rights.

Frankenau was for centuries a poor, little farming town. A particularly heavy fate befell the townsfolk on 22 April 1865 when almost the whole town burnt down in a fire. Through the townsfolk's enormous efforts, the town was built again.

Today, Frankenau is, as an acknowledged resort town, one of Waldeck-Frankenberg's holiday centres and has also been since the early 1970s the main centre of the greater municipality then formed.

== Politics ==
=== Town council ===
The town council's 23 seats are apportioned thus, in accordance with municipal elections held on 26 March 2006:

| SPD | 13 seats |
| Freie Bürger | 6 seats |
| CDU | 4 seats |

Note: Freie Bürger ("Free Citizens") is a citizens' coalition.

=== Coat of arms ===
Frankenau's civic coat of arms might heraldically be described thus: In gules a lion rampant Or armed and langued azure.

Hesse's arms with the lion of Hesse

Frankenau's oldest known seals date from the mid 16th century and showed the lion of Hesse, with the usual red and silver stripes as seen in Hesse's coat of arms at right, and indeed in many civic coats of arms throughout Hesse. The current colours – including the heraldically unusual blue for a lion's tongue – have been in use since at least 1605.

=== Town partnerships ===
- Die, département of Drôme, France, since 1991
- Wirksworth, Derbyshire, United Kingdom, since 2006

The partnership is a three-sided arrangement, with Die and Wirksworth also partnered with each other.

== Personalities ==
Frankenau is psychoanalyst, writer and Dadaism co-founder Richard Huelsenbeck's (1892-1974) birthplace.
