= Homberg (Kellerwald) =

Hill in Hesse, Germany

Coordinates: 51°07′10″N 9°05′17″E

Highest point
- Elevation: 518.5 m (1,701 ft)

Geography
- Location: Hesse, Germany

Homberg is a hill of Hesse, Germany.
