= Gilsa (Schwalm) =

River in Germany

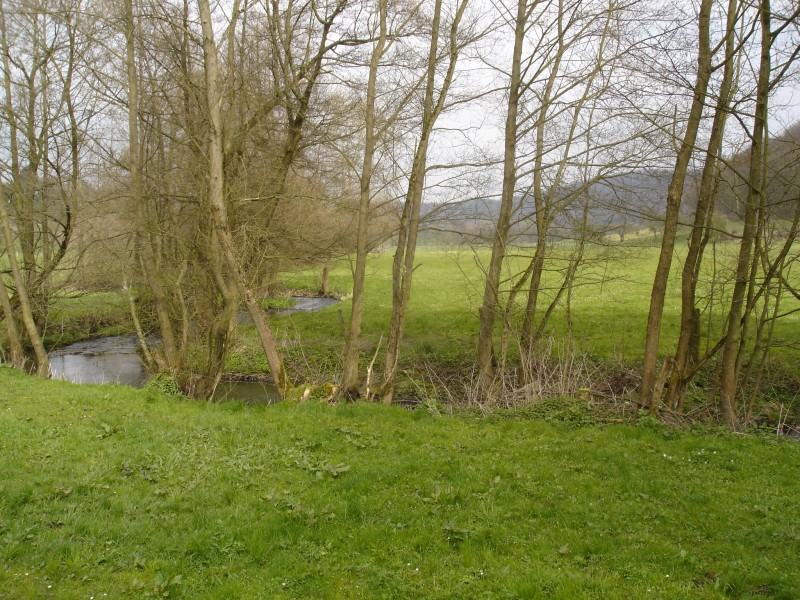

Location
- Country: Germany
- State: Hesse

Physical characteristics
- Mouth
  - location: Schwalm
  - coordinates: 51.0175°N 9.2082°E
- Length: 20.9 km (13.0 mi)

Basin features
- Progression: Schwalm→ Eder→ Fulda→ Weser→ North Sea

The Gilsa is a river of Hesse, Germany. It joins the Schwalm on the left bank near Bischhausen, a parish of Neuental.

The Gilsa rises in the Gilserberg Heights south of Gilserberg, just outside the Kellerwald-Edersee National Park.

== See also ==
- List of rivers of Hesse
