= Traddelkopf =

Mountain in Hesse, Germany

Coordinates: 51°08′N 8°58′E

Highest point
- Elevation: 626.4 m (2,055 ft)

Geography
- Location: Landkreis Waldeck-Frankenberg, Hesse, Germany

Traddelkopf is a mountain of Landkreis Waldeck-Frankenberg, Hesse, Germany.
