= Ohebach (Efze) =

River in Germany

Location
- Country: Germany
- State: Hesse

Physical characteristics
- Source
  - location: near Großropperhausen
  - coordinates: 50.9412°N 9.3641°E
- Mouth
  - location: Efze
  - coordinates: 51.0273°N 9.3716°E

Basin features
- Progression: Efze→ Schwalm→ Eder→ Fulda→ Weser→ North Sea

Ohebach is a river of Hesse, Germany. It springs near Großropperhausen. It is a left tributary of the Efze, into which it flows near Homberg.

== See also ==
- List of rivers of Hesse
