= Talgang (Kellerwald) =

Mountain in Germany

Coordinates: 51°06′N 8°57′E

Highest point
- Elevation: 566.1 m (1,857 ft)

Geography
- Location: Landkreis Waldeck-Frankenberg, Hesse, Germany

Talgang is a mountain of Landkreis Waldeck-Frankenberg, Hesse, Germany.
