= Christoph Scheibler =

German philosopher, classical philologist, theologian and metaphysician

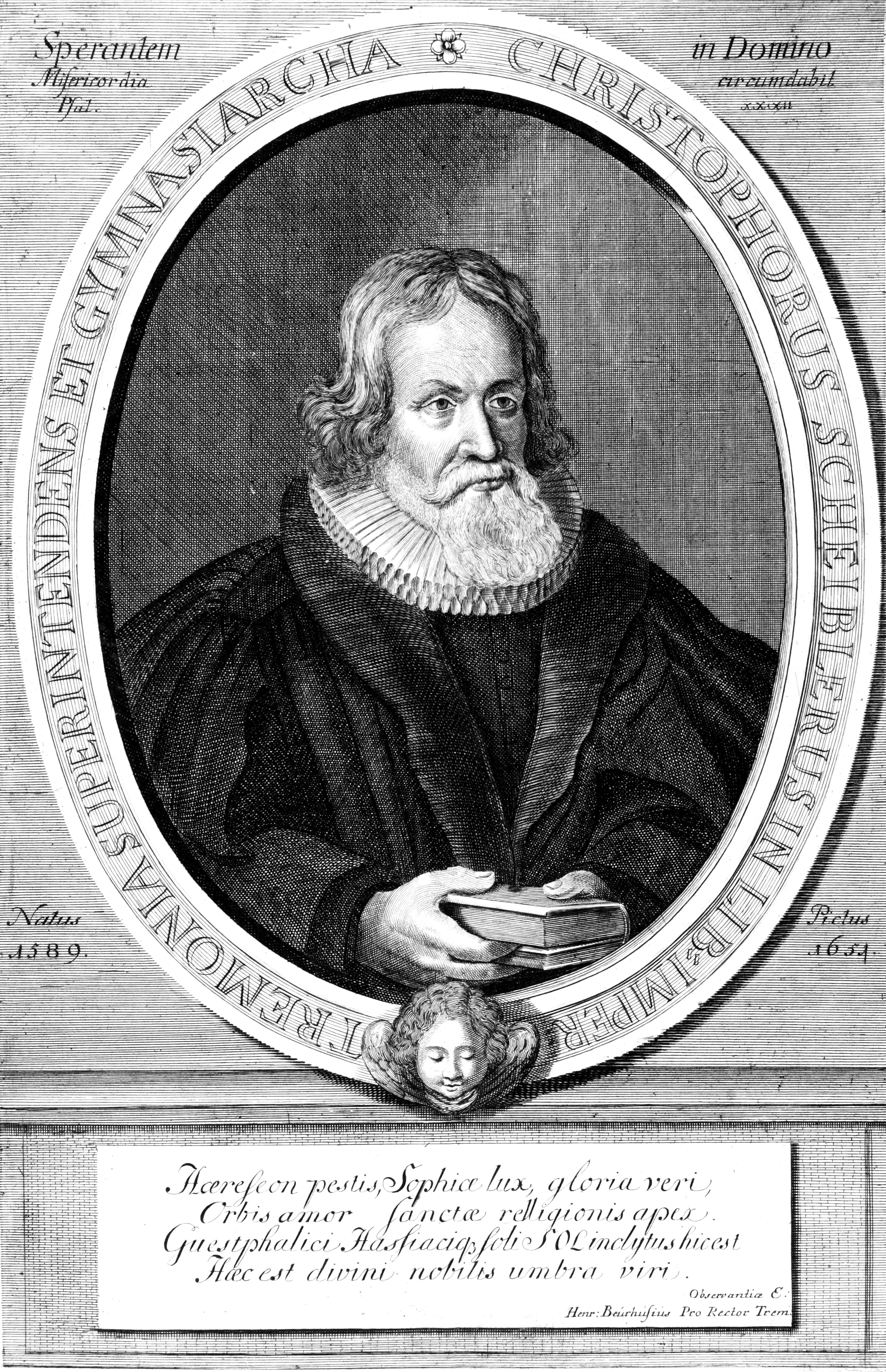
Christoph Scheibler

Christoph Scheibler (born 6 December 1589 in Armsfeld, died 10 November 1653 in Dortmund) was a German philosopher, classical philologist, Lutheran theologian and metaphysician. He was Professor of Logic and Metaphysics at the University of Giessen from 1610. He was appointed as Superintendent, i.e. Bishop, in 1625.

His descendants became a prominent family of both academics and industrialists in western Germany near the current Belgian border, and several descendants were ennobled.

== Works ==
- GlaubensProbe/ Welches Der rechte Uhralte Christliche Catholische Glaube Und Religion sey? : Darinnen gründlich erwiesen/ Daß die Papisten/ in den Streitigen Puncten, denselben Uhralten Glauben/ welchen Christus/ seine Propheten/ Aposteln und Evangelisten gelehret/ nicht haben ...; Wie auch insonderheit/ zwey Cöllnische Scribenten, Hermannus Fley/ genandt Stangenfoll/ Rector daselbst: Und Reinerus Mercator, widerleget werden / Durch Christophorum Scheiblerum, Bey des H. Reichs Stadt Dortmund Superintendenten. Nach dessen seligen Absterben herauß gegeben/ und von einigen Liebhabern der Warheit verlegt worden, 1683
- Philosophia compendiosa : exhibens 1. logicæ, 2. metaphysicæ, 3. physicæ, 4. geometriæ, 5. astronomiæ, 6. opticæ, 7. ethicæ, 8. politicæ & 9. oeconomicæ compendium methodicum, 1671
- Metaphysica dvobvs libris universum bujus scientiæ systema comprehendens : opus, tvm omnium facultatum tùm inprimis philosophiæ & theologiæ studiosis utile & necessarium / Christophori Scheibleri, antehac in academia Giessena professoris, 1655
- Liber commentariorum topicorvm, hoc est, De locis sive argumemtis logicis : additi sunt duo indices, alter capitum, generalium titulorum, & quæstionum, in initio, alter rerum in fine, 1653
- Antehac in Academia Gissena professoris, et pædagogiarchæ, nunc tremoniæ in ecclesia superintendentis, e in gymnasio rectoris metaphysica, 1637
- Metaphysica duobus libris universum huius scientiae systema comprehendens, 1636
- Opus metaphysicum, 1617
- Introductio logicae, 1618
- Epitome logica, 1624
- Liber Sententiarum, 1624
- Liber de anima, 1627
