= Frielendorf =

- Municipality
- Coat of arms

- Location of Frielendorf within Schwalm-Eder-Kreis district
- Interactive map of Frielendorf
- Location within Germany Location within Hesse
- Coordinates: 50°59′N 09°20′E
- Country: Germany
- State: Hesse
- Admin. region: Kassel
- District: Schwalm-Eder-Kreis

Government
  - Mayor (2021–27): Jens Nöll (SPD)

Area
  - Total: 85.83 km^{2} (33.14 sq mi)
- Elevation: 230–260 m (750–850 ft)

Population (2025-12-31)
  - Total: 7,081
  - Density: 82.50/km^{2} (213.7/sq mi)
- Time zone: UTC+01:00 (CET)
  - Summer (DST): UTC+02:00 (CEST)
- Postal codes: 34621
- Dialling codes: 05684
- Vehicle registration: HR, MEG, FZ
- Website: www.frielendorf.de

Frielendorf is a municipality in the Schwalm-Eder district, Hesse, Germany.

== Geography ==
=== Location ===
The state-recognized climatic spa (Luftkurort) of Frielendorf lies 9 km southwest of Homberg on the edge of the Knüllgebirge (a low mountain range).

== Constituent communities ==
Along with the main centre, which bears the same name as the whole municipality, the following centres are also part of Frielendorf:

- Allendorf
- Gebersdorf
- Großropperhausen
- Lanertshausen
- Leimsfeld
- Lenderscheid
- Leuderode
- Linsingen
- Obergrenzebach
- Schönborn
- Siebertshausen
- Spieskappel
- Todenhausen
- Verna
- Welcherod

== Politics ==
=== Municipal council ===
Municipal council is made up of 31 members.

- CDU 8 seats
- SPD 16 seats
- FWGF (citizens' coalition) 7 seats

(as of municipal elections held on 26 March 2006)

=== Mayor ===
Thorsten Vaupel is Frielendorf's mayor.

=== Coat of arms ===
Frielendorf's civic coat of arms might heraldically be described thus: In gules a crenellated tower argent with two small arrow slits, on a three-knolled hill vert, flanked by two rye stalks Or, before the tower a bill hook sable.

== Culture and sightseeing ==
=== Museums ===
- In the museum shop with its exhibit about the Frielendorf coalmine, one can learn about the community's history and about brown coal mining in and around the village.
- The Verna Village Museum has exhibits relating to home décor, chattels and hand tools.

=== Buildings ===
- In Spieskappel stands the Kirche St. Johannes (St. John's Church), consecrated in 1255 and originally belonging to the Premonstratensian church estate of Cappel. The church is usually called the Klosterkirche ("monastery church"). The church's organ was built in Hersfeld organ builder Johannes Schlottmann's workshop.
- The Spießturm is a mediaeval watchtower that can be found on the road between Spieskappel and Obergrenzebach. The tower stands at a spot where, in the Middle Ages, there was a crossroads of important trade roads; it was also at the border of Upper and Lower Hesse. Hessian Landtage (diets) were held here.

=== Parks ===
The Silbersee holiday camp lies east of Frielendorf on the lake of the same name.

== Economy and infrastructure ==
=== Transport ===
Frielendorf lies on Federal Highway (Bundesstraße) B 254 (Homberg – Fulda). The Neuental interchange on Autobahn A 49 (Kassel – Fritzlar – Marburg) is about 11 km away.

The community belongs to the North Hesse Transport Network.

The nearest railway stations are Wabern, Schwalmstadt-Treysa and Kassel-Wilhelmshöhe.

== Twin towns – sister cities ==
Frielendorf is twinned with:

- Kleinschmalkalden, Germany
- Poperinge, Belgium
