= Ottrau =

- Municipality
- Coat of arms

- Location of Ottrau within Schwalm-Eder-Kreis district
- Interactive map of Ottrau
- Location within Germany Location within Hesse
- Coordinates: 50°48′N 09°23′E
- Country: Germany
- State: Hesse
- Admin. region: Kassel
- District: Schwalm-Eder-Kreis

Government
  - Mayor (2021–27): Jonas Korell (CDU)

Area
  - Total: 48.49 km^{2} (18.72 sq mi)
- Elevation: 378 m (1,240 ft)

Population (2025-12-31)
  - Total: 2,201
  - Density: 45.39/km^{2} (117.6/sq mi)
- Time zone: UTC+01:00 (CET)
  - Summer (DST): UTC+02:00 (CEST)
- Postal codes: 34633
- Dialling codes: 06639
- Vehicle registration: HR
- Website: www.ottrau.de

Ottrau is a municipality in the Schwalm-Eder-Kreis in Hesse, Germany.

== Geography ==
Ottrau lies about 10 km northeast of Alsfeld.

=== Constituent communities ===
The community of Ottrau is made up of six constituent communities:

- Ottrau: 730 inhabitants
- Immichenhain: 605 inhabitants
- Weißenborn: 377 inhabitants
- Görzhain: 374 inhabitants
- Schorbach: 348 inhabitants
- Kleinropperhausen: 64 inhabitants

== History ==
The constituent community of Weißenborn had its first documentary mention in 1307 under the name Wisenburn. It was later also named Wiesenbrunn and the name that it has today comes from that.

=== Amalgamations ===
The Greater Community of Ottrau has consisted since Hesse's municipal reform in 1972 of the six formerly independent communities of Ottrau, Immichenhain, Weißenborn, Görzhain, Schorbach und Kleinropperhausen.

== Politics ==
=== Municipal council ===
Ottrau's municipal council is made up of 15 councillors.

- CDU 6 seats
- SPD 4 seats
- FWG (citizens' coalition) 3 seats
- UWG (citizens' coalition) 2 seats

(As of municipal elections held on 26 March 2006)

=== Town partnership ===
- Drávafok, Hungary

== Personalities ==
=== Honorary citizen ===
- Dr. Wilhelm Schäfer, poet and writer, became an honorary citizen on the occasion of his 70th birthday in 1938. Ottrau's primary school is also named after him.
