= Peterskopf (Kellerwald) =

Mountain in Germany

Highest point
- Elevation: 507 m (1,663 ft)
- Coordinates: 51°09′37″N 9°02′08″E

Geography
- Location: Landkreis Waldeck-Frankenberg, Hesse, Germany

Peterskopf is a mountain of Landkreis Waldeck-Frankenberg, Hesse, Germany.
