= Neukirchen, Hesse =

Neukirchen
- Town
- Coat of arms

- Location of Neukirchen within Schwalm-Eder-Kreis district
- Interactive map of Neukirchen
- Location within Germany Location within Hesse
- Coordinates: 50°52′N 9°20′E
- Country: Germany
- State: Hesse
- Admin. region: Kassel
- District: Schwalm-Eder-Kreis
- Subdivisions: 8 Stadtteile

Government
  - Mayor (2020–26): Marian Knauff

Area
  - Total: 66.25 km^{2} (25.58 sq mi)
- Elevation: 305 m (1,001 ft)

Population (2025-12-31)
  - Total: 6,721
  - Density: 101.4/km^{2} (262.8/sq mi)
- Time zone: UTC+01:00 (CET)
  - Summer (DST): UTC+02:00 (CEST)
- Postal codes: 34626
- Dialling codes: 06694
- Vehicle registration: HR
- Website: www.neukirchen.de

Neukirchen (German pronunciation: [nɔʏˈkɪʁçn̩]) is a small town in the Schwalm-Eder district in Hesse, Germany.

== Constituent communities ==
The town is made up of a main town bearing the same name as the whole town, and the centres of Asterode, Christerode, Hauptschwenda, Nausis, Wincherode, Riebelsdorf, Rückershausen and Seigertshausen.

== History ==
Neukirchen had its first documentary mention in 1142 in a document from the Hersfeld monastery. In 1351, Neukirchen was granted town rights. In the Middle Ages, the town was bedevilled by fires that repeatedly broke out. One catastrophe in 1533 destroyed three fourths of all the town's houses.

== Politics ==
The town council is made up of 31 members.

- SPD 9 seats
- CDU 8 seats
- FDP 4 seats
- UBL (citizens' coalition) 4 seats
- FWG (citizens' coalition) 4 seats
- Greens 2 seats

(as of town council elections held on 14 March 2021)

== Culture and sightseeing ==
=== Museums ===
The Heimatmuseum ("Homeland Museum") has documents about the town's history, a complete school classroom and prehistoric collections.

=== Churches ===
==== Nikolaikirche ====
This church's history is closely tied to the town's. The earliest known mention of Neukirchen is in a monastery document from 1142. It is assumed that a few years later, the choir at the Nikolaikirche was built. About 1350, the two-aisled symmetrical hall and the three lower floors of the tower were built onto the choir, as it was at this time that "Nuwenkirchen", as it was then called, was granted town rights. According to an inscription above the doorway of the south aisle, remodelling and expansion were undertaken in 1497 that led to the church being transformed into a three-aisled Gothic hall church with an irregular transept and an eight-sided choir area. Since the Reformation's introduction in Hesse in 1526, Evangelical services have been held there.

The 36-metre-high tower is the town's landmark and was originally built as a millitary structure. Its roof is encircled by a walkway with a tracery gallery dating from around 1500. At the same level, the former dwelling of the tower watchman can still be seen. A guided tower tour offers a fascinating glimpse into the daily life of the “tower family.” The climb of 132 steps is rewarded with outstanding views over Neukirchen and the Knüllgebirge. Since 2001, civil wedding ceremonies have been held in the parlour. For information, call 066 948 0810.

==== Kirche Christerode ====
The Christerode Church's oldest parts have their roots in the Middle Ages. The church is a plain hall whose ceiling rests on a beam laid lengthwise on a mighty oaken column. Over the last few years, the building, threatened as it was by collapse, has been thoroughly renovated. The organ was built about 1912 by Peter Battenberg, an organ builder from Weißenborn, and in 2001 it was restored.

==== Kirche Hauptschwenda ====
Hauptschwenda lies at an elevation of 500 m, making it the highest parish in the church district of Ziegenhain. The place was mentioned in 1223 under the name "Eizicheswinden". Even then, there was a chapel. The place is likely even older. In 1506, Hauptschwenda was mentioned as a pilgrimage place with its Annenquelle (spring, and now called Lindenborn) that could work wonders. The church was bigger before 1537 than the building that stands today. Worth seeing inside are some wall paintings from the 16th century that have been renovated over a long period of time and an organ from 2003.

=== Sport ===
Neukirchen became known nationwide for SC Neukirchen's First Football Team, who played for four years in the Regionalliga (football), which still had four divisions at that time

== Economy and infrastructure ==
=== Transport ===
Neukirchen lies on Federal Highway (Bundesstraße) B 454 (Kirchhain – Niederaula). The town also belongs to the North Hesse Transport Network.

== Personalities ==
- Manfred Roeder (1929-2014), convicted right-wing extremist and Holocaust denier
