= Große Aschkoppe =

Mountain in Germany

- Location within Hesse

Highest point
- Elevation: 639.8 m (2,099 ft)
- Coordinates: 51°4′6″N 9°1′40″E

Geography
- Location: Waldeck-Frankenberg, Hesse, Germany
- Parent range: Kellerwald

Große Aschkoppe is a mountain of Hesse, Germany.
