= Efze =

River in Germany

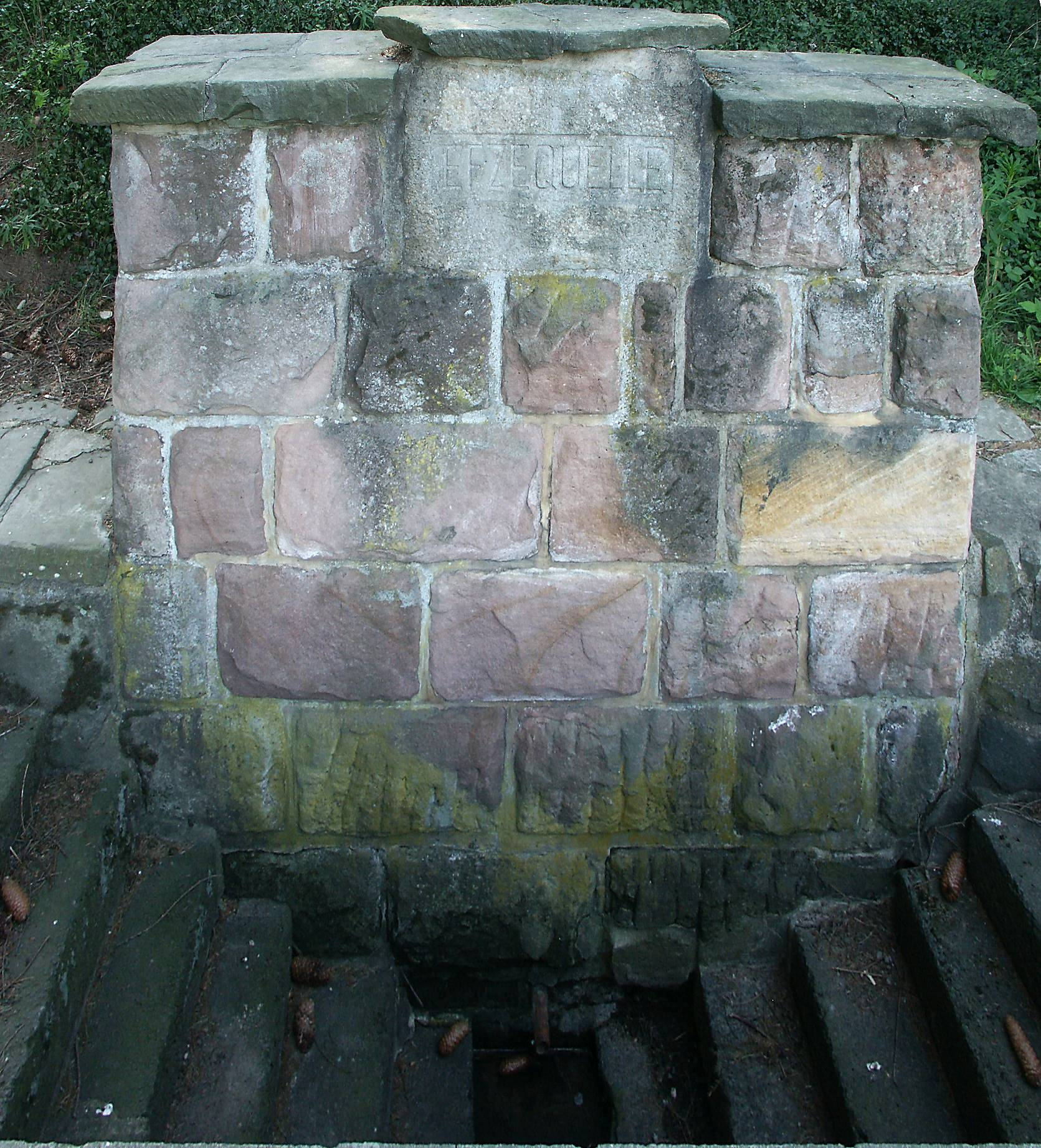

Location
- Country: Germany
- State: Hesse

Physical characteristics
- Mouth
  - location: Schwalm
  - coordinates: 51°04′52″N 9°21′37″E
- Length: 38.1 km (23.7 mi)
- Basin size: 220 km^{2} (85 sq mi)

Basin features
- Progression: Schwalm→ Eder→ Fulda→ Weser→ North Sea

The Efze (German pronunciation: [ˈɛftsə]) is a river of Hesse, Germany and tributary of the Schwalm. It joins the Schwalm on the right bank near Wabern. The tributaries of the Efze include the nearly 22-km long Ohebach.

== See also ==
- List of rivers of Hesse
