= Schwalm-Eder-Kreis =

- District
- Flag Coat of arms
- Coordinates: 51°02′N 9°22′E
- Country: Germany
- State: Hesse
- Adm. region: Kassel
- Capital: Homberg (Efze)

Government
  - District admin.: Winfried Becker (SPD)

Area
  - Total: 1,538.56 km^{2} (594.04 sq mi)

Population (31 December 2022)
  - Total: 182,595
  - Density: 120/km^{2} (310/sq mi)
- Time zone: UTC+01:00 (CET)
  - Summer (DST): UTC+02:00 (CEST)
- Vehicle registration: HR, FZ, MEG, ZIG
- Website: www.schwalm-eder-kreis.de

Schwalm-Eder-Kreis is a Kreis (district) in the north of Hesse, Germany. Neighbouring districts are Kassel, Werra-Meißner, Hersfeld-Rotenburg, Vogelsberg, Marburg-Biedenkopf, and Waldeck-Frankenberg.

== History ==
In 1821 districts were created in Hesse. They included the districts of Fritzlar, Homberg, Melsungen, and Ziegenhain. In 1932 the districts of Fritzlar and Homberg were merged; in 1974 the three districts of Fritzlar-Homberg, Melsungen, and Ziegenhain were merged into the Schwalm-Eder district.

The district is twinned with the Finnish city of Kajaani, the British district of Sedgemoor, and the Polish district of Piła.

== Geography ==
The Schwalm and Eder rivers give the district its name. After they merge close to Felsberg, the Eder enters the Fulda to the north at Edermunde. The southeast of the district includes a portion of the Knüllgebirge range of low mountains; the highest elevation is 634 metres (2,080 ft). In the north are the hills of the Homberger Hochland. The centre of the district is largely rural, and is surrounded by the mountains of the Knüll, the Stölzinger Gebirge, and the Kellerwald with the 675 metre-high Wüstegarten mountain, the highest peak in the district.

== Geology ==
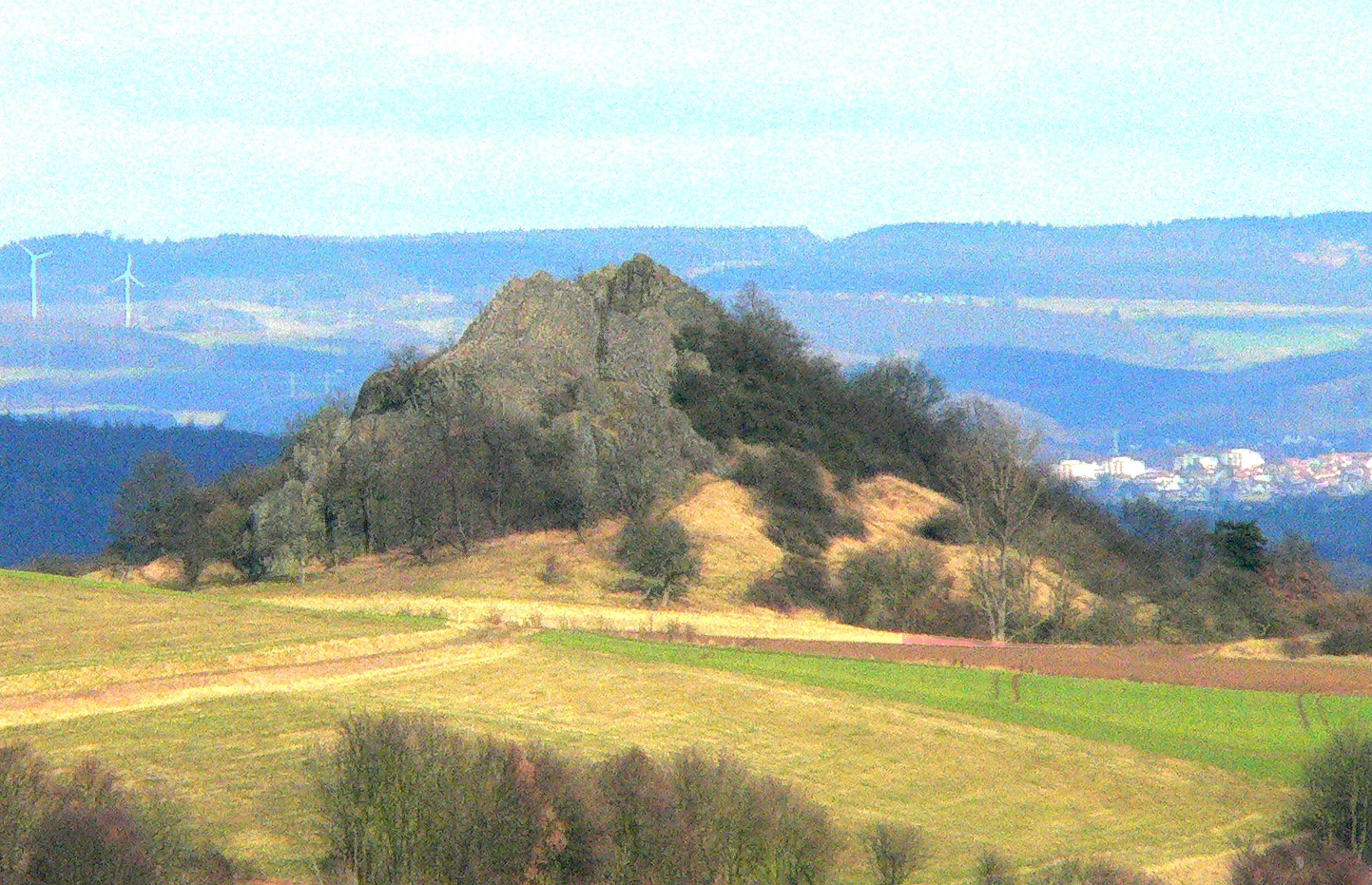
The Scharfenstein, an outcrop of an extinct volcano near Gudensberg

In the east, the geology of the Knüllgebirge is dominated by the clastic Triassic strata of the Middle Buntsandstein, as is the western region around the Gilserberg.

Soils of weathered Buntsandstein are generally acidic to slightly basic and nutrient-poor. For the most part the land is forested.

In the district of Fritzlar there are outcrops of younger Upper Buntsandstein, known as the Röt Formation, because of its red colour. These strata consist of clay beds and various kinds of calcareous beds, interbedded with clayey marls.

== Coat of arms ==
The coat of arms shows the lion of Hesse (azure a lion rampant crowned, barry of six argent and gules, armed or). Below are wavy lines (three bars wavy argent) that symbolise the three main rivers in the district, the Schwalm, the Eder, and the Fulda.

== Towns and municipalities ==
Clickable map of towns and municipalities in the district

Towns
1. Borken
2. Felsberg
3. Fritzlar
4. Gudensberg
5. Homberg
6. Melsungen
7. Neukirchen
8. Niedenstein
9. Schwalmstadt
10. Schwarzenborn
11. Spangenberg
Municipalities
1. Bad Zwesten
2. Edermünde
3. Frielendorf
4. Gilserberg
5. Guxhagen
6. Jesberg
7. Knüllwald
8. Körle
9. Malsfeld

10. Morschen
11. Neuental
12. Oberaula
13. Ottrau
14. Schrecksbach
15. Wabern
16. Willingshausen

== See also ==
- Schwalm (region)
