= Baden Army =

Military organisation of the German state of Baden until 1871

The Baden Army (German: Badische Armee) was the military organisation of the German state of Baden until 1871. The origins of the army were a combination of units that the Badenese margraviates of Baden-Durlach and Baden-Baden had set up in the Baroque era, and the standing army of the Swabian Circle, to which both territories had to contribute troops. The reunification of the two small states to form the Margraviate of Baden in 1771 and its subsequent enlargement and elevation by Napoleon to become the Grand Duchy of Baden in 1806 created both the opportunity and obligation to maintain a larger army, which Napoleon used in his campaigns against Austria, Prussia and Spain and, above all, Russia.

After the end of Napoleon's rule, the Grand Duchy of Baden contributed a division to the German Federal Army. In 1848, Badenese troops helped to suppress the Hecker uprising, but a year later a large number sided with the Baden revolutionaries. After the violent suppression of the revolution by Prussian and Württemberg troops, the army was re-established and fought in the Austro-Prussian War of 1866 on the side of Austria and the southern German states, as well as in the Franco-Prussian War of 1870 on the side of the Germans. When Baden joined the German Empire in 1870/71, the Grand Duchy gave up its military sovereignty and the Badenese troops became part of the XIV Army Corps of the Imperial German Army.

== Thirty Years' War ==
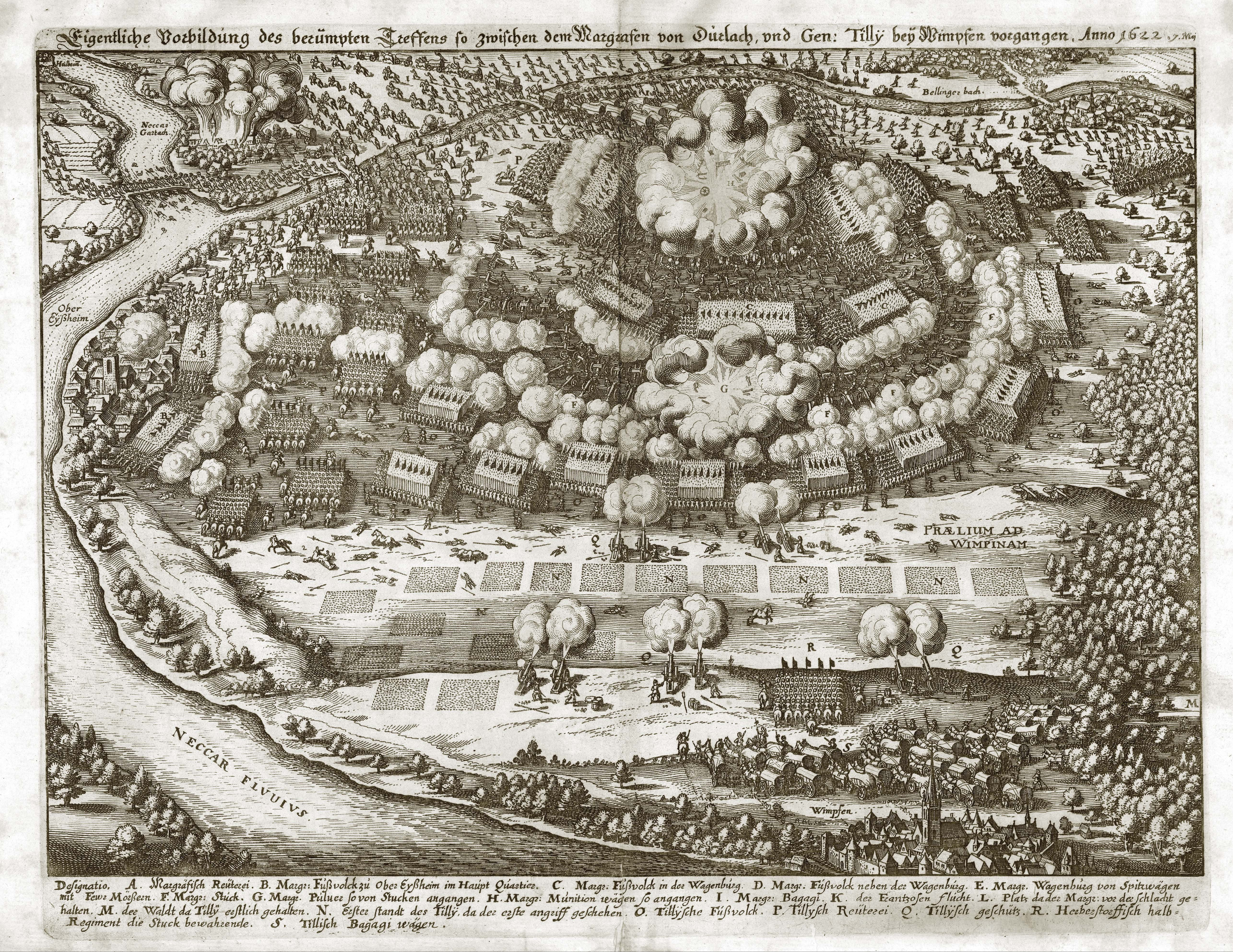
Matthäus Merian: The Battle of Wimpfen

During the Occupation of Upper Baden, George Frederick of Baden-Durlach was able to reunite the two parts of Baden-Baden and Baden-Durlach and, around 1600, generate a force of 200 cavalry, 600 foot soldiers and 40 guns. The Protestant margrave, whose territory was in the vicinity of the Habsburg Further Austria and who was in inheritance disputes with the Catholic Baden-Baden line, joined the Protestant Union in 1608 and increased the size of his army to 15,000 men around 1617.

For his sons Frederick, Charles and Christopher, George Frederick wrote his own book on military operations from 1614 to 1617, which he never published. He also relied on the military academy known as the School of War (Ritterliche Kriegsschule), founded in 1616 by John VII, Count of Nassau-Siegen in Siegen.

At the beginning of the Thirty Years' War he sided with the "Winter King", Frederick V of the Palatinate. After Spanish troops occupied the Palatinate and the Protestant Union had dissolved, George Frederick wanted to unite his now 20,000 strong army with the troops of Ernst von Mansfeld who were fighting in the Palatinate against the Catholic troops under Tilly. However, the Margrave and von Mansfeld did not agree on who should be in command of the united army, so a merger did not come about. Instead, the Badenese armed forces fought on 6 May 1622 without Mansfeld's troops against Tilly and were defeated in the Battle of Wimpfen, one of the bloodiest battles of the Thirty Years' War. George Frederick's army was smashed in the process, the margrave himself escaped, according to tradition, only through a sacrifice made by 400 men of Pforzheim who covered his retreat and all died in the process, with the exception of the standard bearer. As a result of the defeat, the Upper Baden Occupation was reversed, parts of Baden-Durlach were also occupied and plundered by troops of the League.

George Frederick also carried around 70 so-called pike or pointed wagons in his army. The pointed wagons are described as an invention of his. These are wagons with two or three axles, on which two beams are attached so that the wheels can be easily and widely rotated. Small swivelling howitzers (sometimes also referred to as mortars) were attached to the beams, as well as iron pikes (hence the name) which were pointed outwards, in particular to ward off enemy cavalry.

It was not until 1631 that George Frederick's son and successor Frederick V Was financially able to raise his own troops again, but this was prevented by the invasion of Bavarian troops. The Baden regions remained a theatre of war in the years that followed, mainly due to fighting between Swedish troops (which Frederick allied with) and Imperial troops. From 1634, the Imperial side gained the upper hand, Frederick lost his territory and was only able to get it back in the course of the Treaty of Westphalia, but without the Baden-Baden territories, which went back to the Catholic line. In Baden's case, the Peace of Westphalia did not restore the state to its pre-1618 borders, but rather to that before the occupation of Upper Baden.

== Swabian Imperial Circle and other territorial units to 1780 ==
The Margraviate of Baden reunited in 1771 (Hellbraun)

Under the leadership of Circle Field Marshal (Kreisfeldmarschall) Louis William of Baden-Baden and the Duchy of Württemberg the Imperial Swabian Circle decided to set up a standing body of circle troops (Kreisheer) for which the different regions of the Circle had to provide certain contingents. Between 1732 and 1796 this 'circle army' consisted of five regiments that were set up separately based on their Christian denominations. The Protestant Margraviate of Baden-Durlach provided 23 dragoons for the circle's regiment of dragoons (Kreisdragonerregiment) and 121 infantrymen for the 1st Circle Infantry Regiment (Kreisinfanterieregiment). Members of the Baden-Durlach ruling house held the command of the same 1st Infantry. The Catholic Margraviate of Baden-Baden provided 19 cuirassiers for the Circle Curassiers Regiment and 122 infantrymen for the 3rd Circle Infantry. In addition to the two Badenese margraviates, the Duchy of Württemberg, the Prince-Bishopric of Augsburg and the Imperial cities mainly bore the major cost of the circle army, but even smaller counties and lordships had to provide contingents (for example Gengenbach Abbey had to provide a cuirassier and two infantrymen).

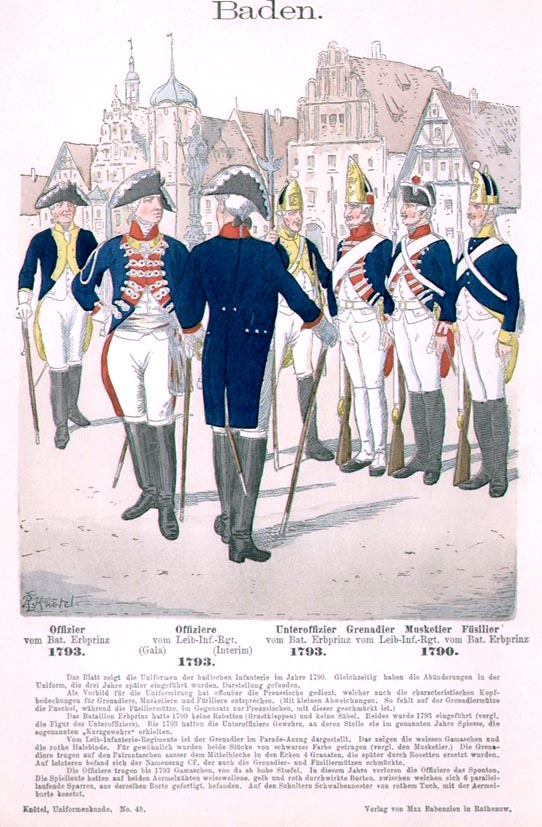
Uniforms of the various Baden associations, late 18th C. L to R: Fusilier officer, two officers of the Life Guard Infantry Regiment, NCO of fusiliers, grenadier of the Life Guards, musketeer of the Infantry Life Guards, fusilier. Drawing: Richard Knötel

Besides the circle troops, both Baden-Baden and Baden-Durlach had their own troops, so-called household troops, which included the Life Guards (Leibgarde). In Baden-Durlach, a grenadier battalion of four companies and a dragoon squadron was set up in 1752, Baden-Baden was followed in 1763 with an equally strong grenadier battalion, a cuirassier company and a squadron of hussars. After the death of the last Baden-Baden margrave, Augustus George Simpert, Frederick of Baden-Durlach finally reunited the two states into the Margraviate of Baden. United Baden now had a population of around 257,000, and although Charles Frederick had taken on the debts of the old Baden-Baden margraviate which he had to pay off, he was also able to enlarge the army. In 1780, he united the Baden-Baden and Baden-Durlach Grenadier Battalions to form the Life Guard Infantry Regiment consisting of a battalion of musketeers and a battalion of grenadiers. The hussar squadron remained as an independent unit, the Baden-Baden Cuirassiers and Baden-Durlachian Dragoons formed the Garde du Corps and on top of that two fusilier battalions were set up. Together with a garrison company and four three-pounder guns, the Baden Army comprised 1,125 men and the military budget in 1782/83 was a little more than 105,000 Baden gulden.

The illegitimate son of Margrave Charles Frederick, Charles Frederick Hermann of Freystedt created a militia system and is considered the pioneer of general conscription. With a reform of Baden's military law, he also ensured a certain protection of the soldiers from the arbitrariness of their superiors in 1782.

== Napoleonic Wars and Confederation of the Rhine ==
The French Revolution and resulting tensions between France and the great powers of the Holy Roman Empire put Baden in a difficult situation. On the one hand, in the course of the revolution, it finally lost control of its possessions on the left bank of the Rhine; and on the other hand it was situated on the Upper Rhine, wedged between France and Further Austria and exposed to the danger of becoming a theatre of war as it had been during the Thirty Years' War of 1618–1648.

=== First Coalition War ===
In the autumn of 1792, the Margraviate joined the anti-French coalition and undertook to provide 1,000 soldiers. In return, the coalition promised to return the occupied left bank of the Rhine to Baden when a peace treaty was agreed and to reimburse its war costs. In addition to its regular forces, Heinrich Medicus organised a Baden state militia consisting of single 19–50 year olds, so that the military strength of the Margraviate grew to around 16,000 men. Military spending also rose drastically, the average ten-year defence budget between 1789 and 1798 was around 158,000 gulden.

As a result of its defeat in the War of the First Coalition, however, the coalition's promises were not fulfilled and Baden's left bank of the Rhine was finally lost de facto in 1794. Prussia reached an accommodation with France in 1795, and the Margrave of Baden also committed to peace: in 1796 a separate treaty was signed, Baden left the coalition and gave up its left bank territory. However, since Austria continued the war, Baden, which was actually neutral, became a theatre of war: there were battles at Emmendingen and Schliengen in October 1796 and parts of South Baden were plundered by the French armies.

=== Second Coalition War ===
In the War of the Second Coalition, Margrave Charles Frederick remained neutral. As a result of the Reichsdeputationshauptschluss in 1803 and the Treaty of Pressburg, Baden increased its territory: in addition to land ruled by the Church and former Imperial cities, the Electoral Palatine and the Breisgau became part of the Margraviate which, in 1803, was elevated to become an Electorate and, in 1806, a Grand Duchy. Many of the new Baden territories had previously raised their own small military forces which now became part of the Baden Army. This grew and included the following in 1806:

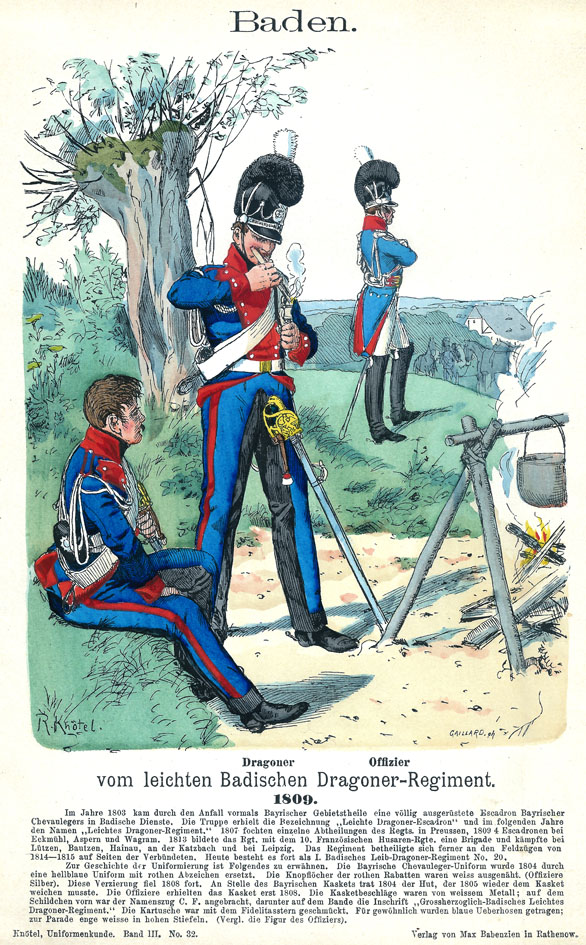
Baden Dragoons, 1809 (drawing by Richard Knötel)

Infantry	Cavalry	Artillery
One life guard regiment and three line regiments	The Garde du Corps	Three batteries
One independent battalion of grenadiers and one of Jägers	One regiment of dragoons	
Four garrison regiments	One regiment of hussars	

The total strength of the army was 14 battalions of infantry, 10 squadrons of cavalry and three batteries of artillery. The Electorate/Grand Duchy was divided into four cantons along the lines of the Prussian model.

=== Third Coalition War ===
With the increase in territory and military forces, thanks to Napoleon, came obligations. For the War of the Third Coalition, Baden switched sides to join France and had to provide 3,000 men. However, by the time they joined Napoleon's army, the war had already been decided by the battles of Ulm and Austerlitz.

=== Fourth Coalition War ===
In the Fourth Coalition War, Baden's quota comprised 6,000 men, who only entered the campaign after the Battle of Jena-Auerstedt. However, they were employed in the sieges of Danzig and Stralsund. Their commander was Joseph von Cloßmann.

=== Peninsular War ===
In 1808, the Grand Duchy had to provide another contingent comprising a regiment of foot with 46 officers and 1,687 men under Colonel (later Major General) Heinrich von Porbeck and a battery of six guns under Captain (later Lieutenant General and Adjutant General) von Lassolaye. These troops formed up in July and moved across the Rhine to Kehl on 25 August before assembling in Metz at the end of August where they were issued with French weapons. They marched through France and crossed the River Bidasoa on 13 October. Over the following six years they participated in the Peninsula War in Iberia. They fought the Spanish Guerilleros inter alia at Talavera where von Porbeck was killed, and the Battle of Vitoria. The Badenese suffered heavy losses: of their original strength of 1,733 men only 500 returned to Baden. At the beginning of the War of the Fifth Coalition in 1809, Napoleon asked for a new contingent of 6,850 men, who fought under the French Marshal André Masséna at the Battle of Ebelsberg. At the Battle of Aspern-Essling the Baden Dragoons distinguished themselves; twelve of its members receiving the Knight's Cross of the Legion of Honour. The Badenese troops were also used in the Battle of Wagram and against the insurgent Tyrolese, so that the last of them only returned to Grand Duchy in 1810.

== Napoleon's Russian campaign ==
An even heavier burden followed when Napoleon began his invasion of Russia and demanded around 6,700 men from Baden. Apart from a battalion assigned to the imperial headquarters, the Badenese contingent under Major General William of Hochberg formed a brigade in Marshal Victor's IX Corps. The corps was assembled in Tilsit and spent August 1812 there. Illnesses and the unusual weather with its rapid changes affected the soldiers and reduced the strength of the corps by around a sixth before they even left. The corps finally marched off on 30 August, via Wilna (8 September) and Minsk (15 September) reaching Smolensk on 28 September. On 31 October, the Baden Brigade fought in the Battle of Chashniki and lost 20 men killed and wounded. In the following days there were further skirmishes between the IX and II Corps of the French Army and the Russian Army under Wittgenstein, which tried to attack the rear of the main French army retreating from Moscow.

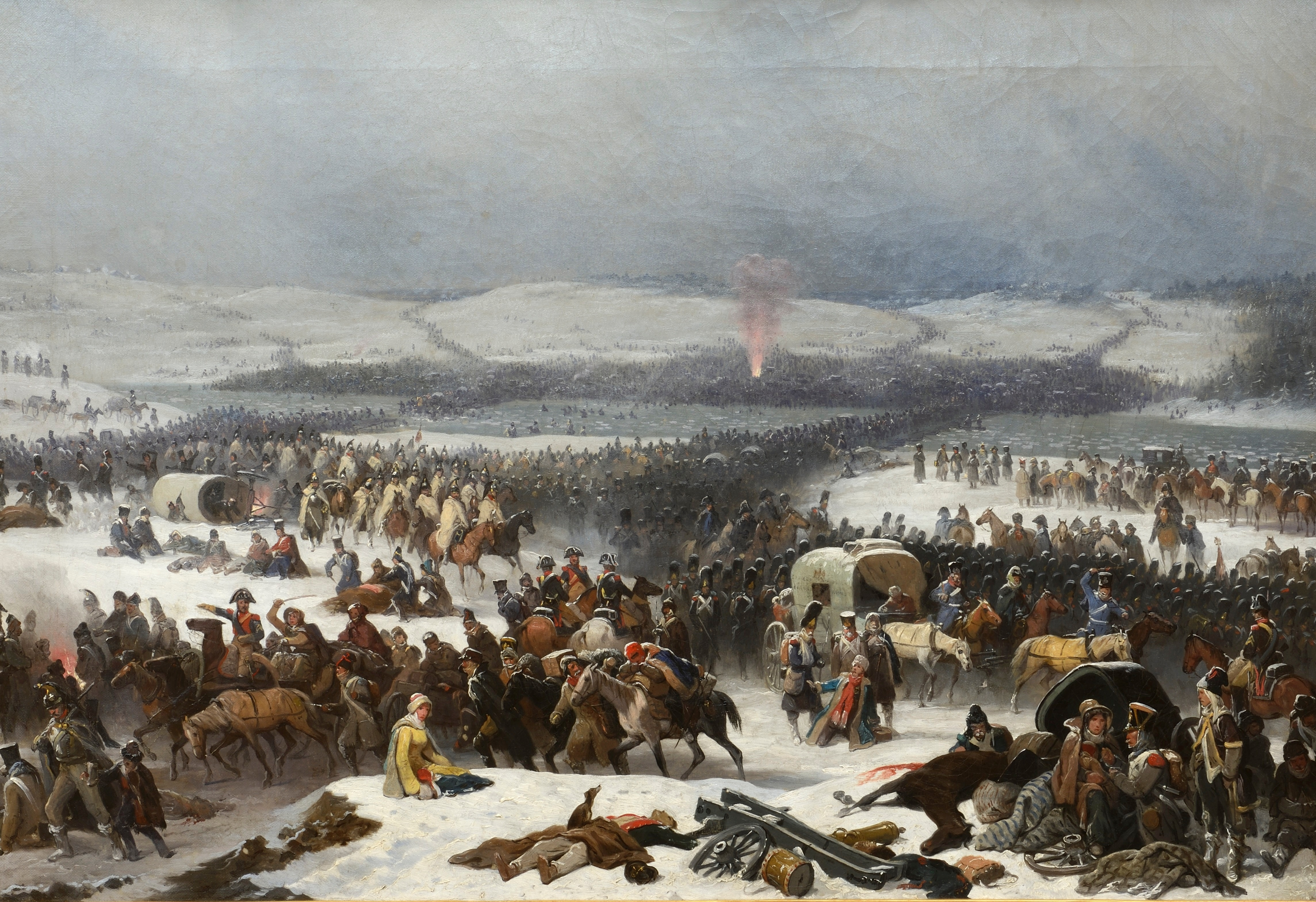
Napoleon's crossing of the Berezina was covered by Baden, Hessian, Polish and Bergian soldiers of the IX Corps.

The corps then also retreated under rearguard action, and on 26 November it met the remnants of the army coming from Moscow near Borisov. The strength of the Baden Brigade at this time was still 2,240 men and thus around a third of the original force. On 28 November the Battle of Berezina took place, in which the IX Corps, east of the river, faced Wittgenstein's army. The Baden Brigade was west of the river at this point, but was ordered back to the corps early in the morning, great confusion occurring at the river crossings. The Baden Brigade then formed the right wing of the IX Corps, their position ran from the Berezina to Studyanka. In fierce fighting, the infantry succeeded in repelling the Russian attacks. Losses were very high, more than 1,100 men were killed or wounded, leaving the brigade with a strength of only 900 after fighting ended. The Baden Hussars, reinforced by Hessian Chevau-légers, broke up a column of Russian infantry and took 500 prisoners, but was then wiped out by Russian cuirassiers. It lost the majority of its officers and around 150 soldiers and was then only a few men strong. After this bloody rearguard action, the IX Corps crossed the Berezina on the morning of 29 November and destroyed the bridge behind it.

In the years that followed, the Baden Brigade continued to function as the rear guard of the army. Further battles and above all the extreme cold claimed more and more lives. William of Hochberg later wrote:

7th December was the worst day of my life. At 3 o'clock in the morning the marshal ordered the march; the cold had sunk to its lowest point - when the signal was to be given, the last drum had frozen solid. So I now went round the individual soldiers and encouraged them to get up and collect themselves, but all efforts were in vain, I could hardly gather 50 men, the rest of 200-300 men lay dead or half-frozen on the ground.

— William of Hochberg, Memoranda of General of Infantry, Margrave William of Baden

The brigade was reconstituted as a regiment and arrived in Wilna on 8 December 1812, just around 400 strong. All in all, Napoleon's Russian campaign had cost the lives of more than 6,000 soldiers from Baden. As a consequence, the tailor, Franz Anton Egetmeyer, who was born in the Badenese town of Bretten, became famous, because he settled as a tailor in Penza and looked after Badenese prisoners of war there. The story of the "tailor of Pensa" was taken up in 1815 by Johann Peter Hebel in the form of a so-called calendar story (Kalendergeschichte).

== German campaign of 1813 ==
The remnants of the Baden Brigade were reinforced in Glogau by 1,200 men in order to defend the French-held fortress against the advancing Russian and Prussian besiegers. Additional troops were raised who took part in the Spring Campaign and fought in the Battle of Großgörschen, among others. A second brigade was set up from August, so that the Badenese contingent in Napoleon's army now comprised two brigades with around 7,000 men. Together with those troops still in Spain, the Baden Army looked like this in 1813:

Infantry	Cavalry	Artillery
Four line regiments	The Corps Guard	One battalion of 3 field batteries and 1 horse artillery battery
The Life Guard Grenadiers	Two regiments of dragoons	
One light battalion		

In the Autumn campaign the two Badenese brigades fought in Marshal MacDonald's XI Corps inter alia in the Battle of the Katzbach and in the Battle of Leipzig. As on the Berezina, it was their duty to cover Napoleon's retreat after the defeat at Leipzig. The Badenese infantry refused to defect and were taken prisoner by Prussia, from whom they were soon released again after the Grand Duchy broke away from Napoleon and on 20 November 1813 switched to the side of Austria, Prussia and Russia. Landwehr and Landsturm were set up based on the Prussian model, and with the introduction of general conscription in December 1813, a total of 16,000 men were called up. Reinforced by Liechtenstein and Hohenzollern troops, it formed the VIII Army Corps. Under the command of William of Hochberg, it besieged the French fortresses of Kehl, Strasbourg, Landau in der Pfalz and Pfalzburg and returned to Baden in June 1814. An exception was the Life Guard Grenadier Battalion, which fought together with the Prussian-Russian Guard Corps in the Battle of Paris and moved into the city on 1 April. During the Napoleon's reign of the Hundred Days a field division had to be raised again, but it did not take part in any combat operations.

== German Confederation to the Baden Revolution ==
=== The Baden Army within the German Federal Army ===
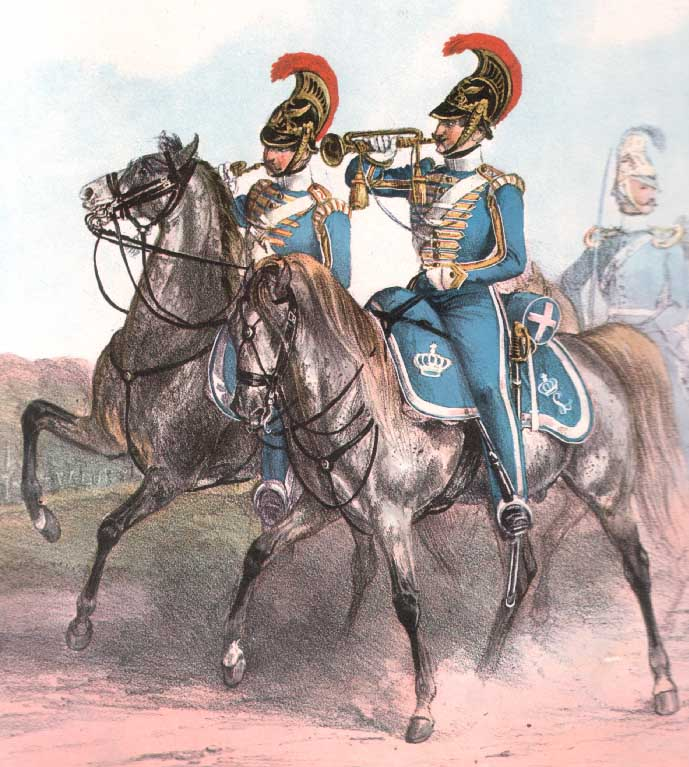
Baden Dragoons of the Federal Army, c. 1830, lithograph by Heinrich Ambros Eckert

At the Congress of Vienna in 1815, the German Confederation was founded, the Grand Duchy of Baden being one of its founder members. On 9 April 1821, the federal government issued its 'war constitution', which provided for a jointly established federal army to which the states had to contribute quotas. In order to be prepared in case of war, the contingents assigned to the Federation had to be kept ready in times of peace. The size of the respective contingents was determined by the population of the contributing state; essentially, a state's armed forces had to make up one percent of its total population, excluding auxiliary troops. In addition, when the Federal Army mobilised, each state had to field replacement troops comprising one six hundredth of its total population. Furthermore, the arms of service had to be provided in certain ratios to one another: one seventh of each contingent was to consist of cavalry, and there had to be two artillery pieces for every one thousand men.

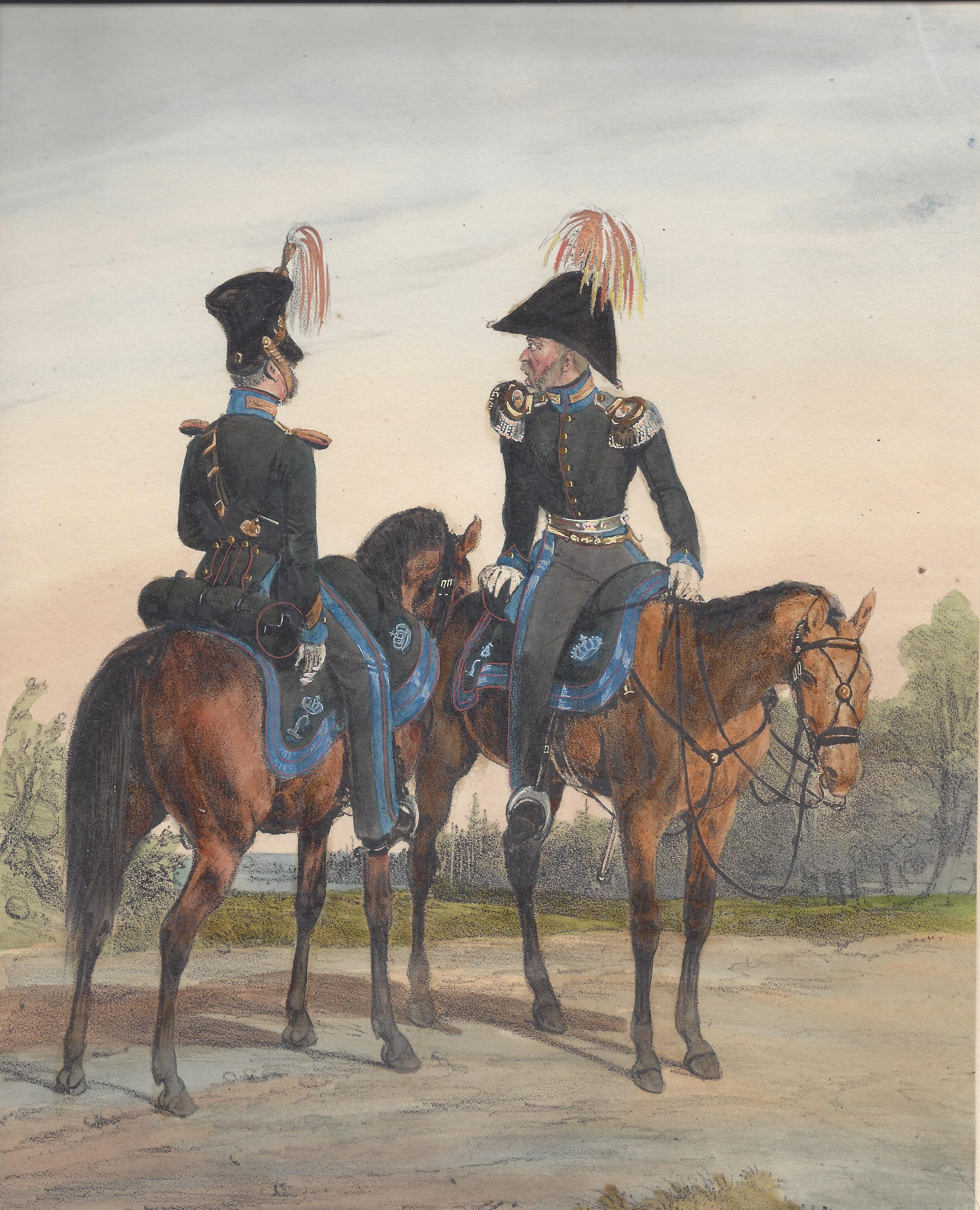
Baden Gendarmerie

A War Ministry was set up in Baden for military purposes. Its Commander-in-Chief (Oberste Kriegsheer) was the Grand Duke, who appointed a general as President of the Ministry of War. The Badenese contingent for the Federal Army was organised into a division and the subordinated to the VIII Army Corps where it formed the 2nd Division. The VIII Army Corps was a mixed corps, in addition to the Badenese troops, it also included Württembergian and Hessian troops. At the head of the division was a divisional commander with the rank of lieutenant general, the two brigades of the division were commanded by major generals or colonelss. A brigade consisted of two or three infantry regiments each with an establishment of three battalions and 2,088 men. The infantry life guard regiment was a little stronger at 3,125 men. The cavalry formed a brigade of three dragoon regiments, each of 718 men under the command of a lieutenant general. The artillery was also organised into a brigade and comprised four batteries of artillery and one company of engineers. Of the four batteries, one was mounted and had six guns, the three field batteries had eight each. The total strength was 30 guns and 1,315 men. In 1829 the Grand Duchy of Baden Gendarmerie Corps (Großherzoglich Badisches Gendarmeriekorps) was founded, which was part of the army and organisationally subordinate to the Ministry of War, but in service to the Ministry of the Interior. As far as is known, it had no military police duties.

The following gives an overview of the status of the Baden Army in 1832:

Infantry	Cavalry	Artillery
Life Guard Infantry Regiment (Leibinfanterieregiment)	Grand Duke's Dragoon Regiment (Dragonerregiment Großherzog)	Artillery brigade of four batteries
1st (Grand Duke's) Infantry Regiment (Linieninfanterieregiment Großherzog Nr. 1)	1st (Margrave Max's) Dragoon Regiment (Dragonerregiment Markgraf Max Nr. 1)	
2nd (Hereditary Grand Duke's) Infantry Regiment (Linieninfanterieregiment Erbgroßherzog Nr. 2)	2nd (von Freystedt's) Dragoon Regiment (Dragonerregiment von Freystedt Nr. 2)	
3rd (Margrave William's) Infantry Regiment (Linieninfanterieregiment Markgraf Wilhelm Nr. 3)		
4th (von Stockhorn's) Infantry Regiment (Linieninfanterieregiment von Stockhorn Nr. 4)		

With the exception of the Life Guards and the Dragoons (formerly Life Guard Dragoons or Gardedragonerregiment) the regiments were given a consecutive number and named after their regimental colonels.

The infantry were equipped with percussion rifles, the dragoons each carried a sabre, a pistol and a carbine. The artillery included six- and twelve-pounder guns, seven-pounder howitzers, plus sixteen and twenty-four-pounder guns and mortars of various calibres as siege artillery. The peacetime strength of the Army was 14,459 men. The contingent to be provided for the VIII Army Corps was 10,000 men, plus 1,667 as reserve personnel and 3,333 as reserves in the event of war.

There was a general school of war in Karlsruhe for the training of officers. Also in Karlsruhe was the Higher School of War for general staff officers. Artillery officers and non-commissioned officers were trained at Gottesaue Palace. The Badische Gewehrfabrik (Badenese Small Arms Factory) was initially the supplier of the percussion rifles.

In 1848, part of the Baden Army was sent to the war against Denmark. The deployment comprised five infantry battalions and one field battery that served in a brigade in the mixed division of the Württemberg General Moriz von Miller and were stationed in Holstein. The majority of the troops were soon withdrawn, but the 1st Battalion of the 4th Infantry Regiment remained in Schleswig after the Armistice of Malmö and took part in the Battle of Ulderup where, together with the Württemberg troops, acted as a reserve to prevent a defeat. Then it remained in the area Eckernförde for coastal security. In the meantime there had been several armed conflicts in Baden which culminated in the uprising of 1849.

=== The Baden Revolutions of 1848 ===
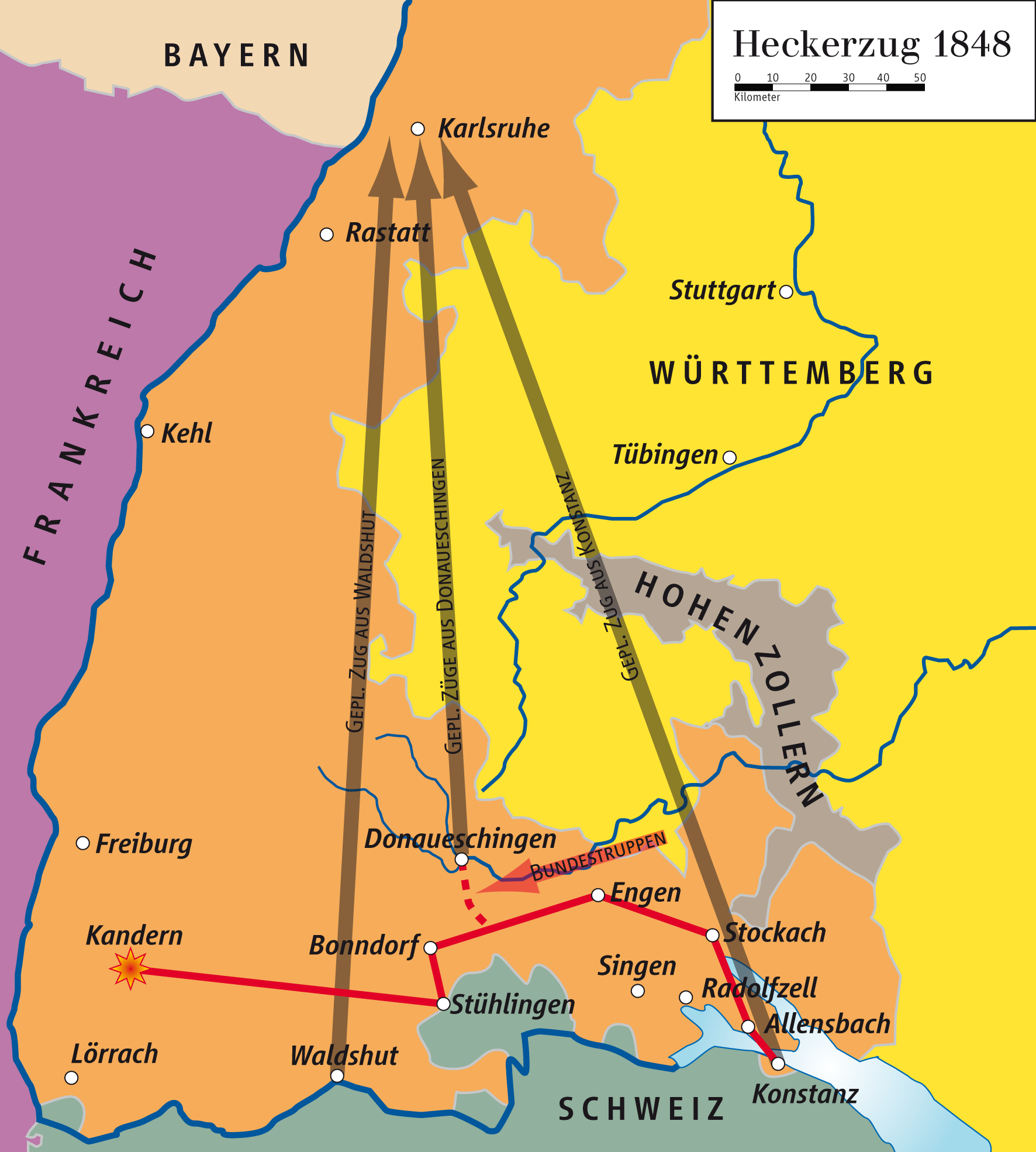
Map of the Hecker campaign

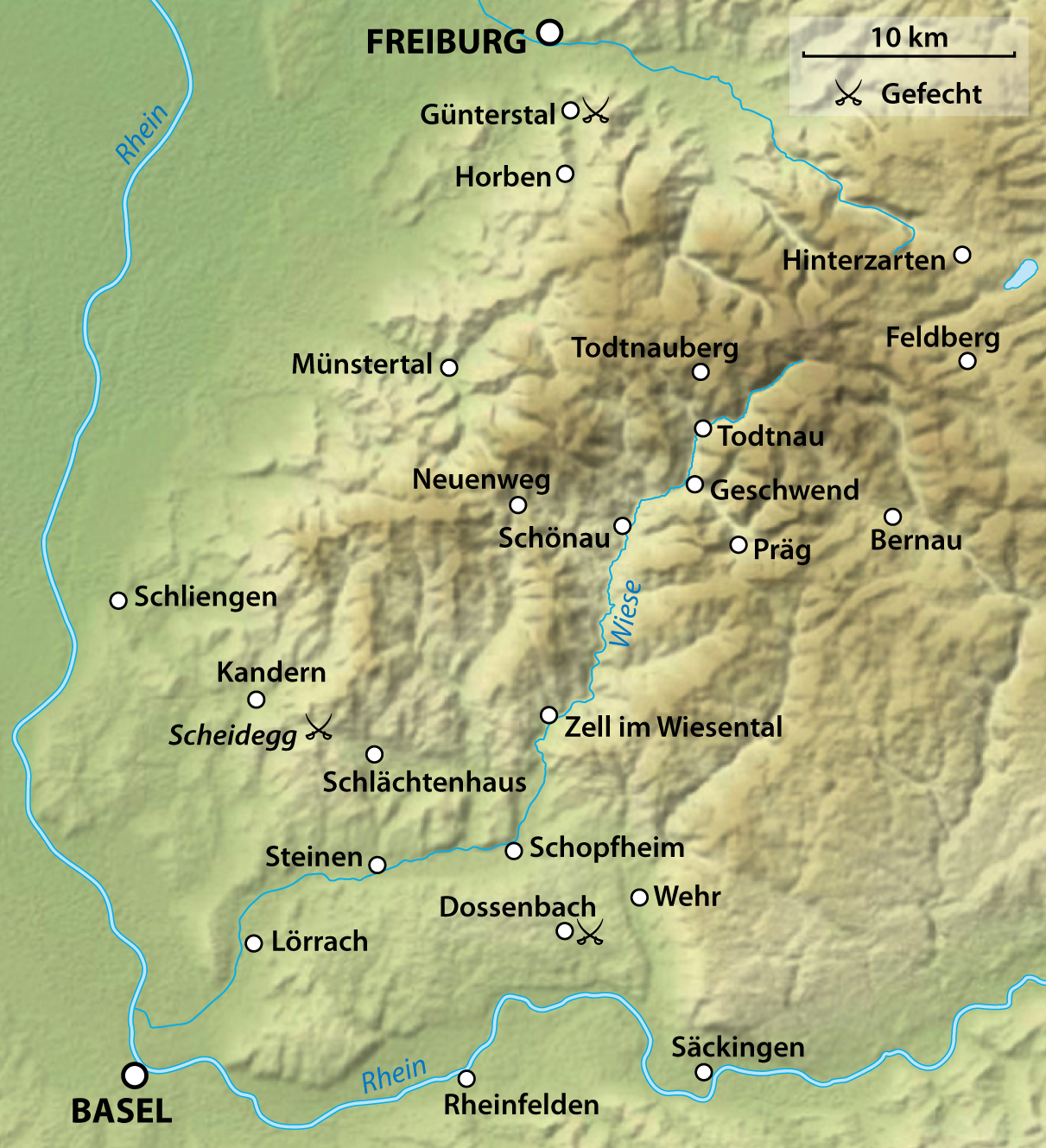
Map of the area affected by the uprising

In April 1848 there were several uprisings in Baden, the best known of which was the Hecker uprising. Led by Friedrich Hecker, Gustav Struve, Franz Sigel and Joseph Fickler, volunteers (Freischärle) moved from the county of Seekreis in the south-east of the country towards the west and north, while the German Democratic Legion raised in Paris and stationed in Alsace threatened to cross the Rhine. Against the revolutionaries from within and without, troops of the VII and VIII Army Corps were deployed in Baden, moving towards the Badenese Oberland in three columns: a large part of the Baden Army, reinforced by Hessian and Nassau troops, marched through the Upper Rhine Plain from north to south. The commander of this force was General Friedrich von Gagern, who was actually in Dutch service. At the same time, a Württemberg division under General Moriz von Miller was moving southwest from the Baden-Württemberg border to Donaueschingen, and a Bavarian brigade was marching west from Bavaria into the Seekreis.

Due to the presence of Württemberg troops near Donaueschingen, the direct route from Konstanz to Freiburg and further north was blocked for the revolutionaries. Hecker was pushed south and moved west in mid-April until he reached the Wiesental valley and marched through it to Steinen. From Steinen he tried to turn north again and reached Kandern on 19 April. However, on 20 April he encountered there some of the Badenese-Hessian troops under Friedrich von Gagern. Hecker withdrew from Kandern in the direction of the Wiesental, where another group of rebels under Joseph Fickler was waiting in Steinen, but before that he was defeated in the Battle on the Scheideck between Kandern and the Wiesental. The battle claimed around a dozen serious injuries and dead on both sides. Among the dead was Gagern, who was succeeded by Badenese colonel, Heinrich von Hinckeldey. Hinckeldey continued to pursue the rebels and on the same day defeated Fickler's men at Steinen. Hecker's and Fickler's defeat also prevented the two rebel groups from uniting with a third led by Franz Sigel, whose irregulars were at Todtnau on 20 April. Instead, Sigel marched against Freiburg. In the Battle of Günterstal his men were also defeated on 23 April and dispersed the next day. That left only the German Legion of Georg Herwegh that had been raised in Paris, but he decided to retreat across the Rhine after the defeats of Hecker, Fickler and Sigel. On 27 April, in the Battle of Dossenbach, it encountered parts of the Württemberg division and was also crushed. This ended the first Baden insurrection (16–27 April).

However, only 5 months later, in September, there was another uprising, the Struve Putsch. Gustav Struve, who fled to Switzerland after the April insurrection, crossed the border into Baden again on 21 September and proclaimed the German Republic in Lörrach that same day. From Lörrach he moved north and reached Staufen im Breisgau via Kandern and Schliengen on 24 September. Between eight and ten thousand men had meanwhile joined his ranks. At Staufen, however, he encountered a force that had been summoned from Karlsruhe and Rastatt consisting of two battalions of infantry, one squadron of cavalry and four guns and commanded by General Friedrich Hoffmann. Hoffmann's contingent, about 800 strong met around 3,000 revolutionaries who had barricaded themselves near Staufen. The rebels were decisively defeated in the Battle of Staufen in the course of which 19 of their number and one soldier were killed, several houses were set on fire and 60 insurgents were captured. The revolutionaries fled to the upper Wiesental valley and from there to Wehr, where Struve was captured on 25 September.

== The Revolution of 1849 ==
The failure of the German nations' Constitution of St. Paul's Church and the resulting Imperial Constitution Campaign also led to unrest in the Grand Duchy of Baden. A congress of the people's associations in Offenburg was scheduled for 12 May 1849, which was to be followed by a people's assembly. In contrast to 1848, however, the revolutionary-republican mood had also reached the Army. The garrison of Rastatt Fortress held a joint meeting with the Rastatt Democrats on 9 and 10 May, at which the soldiers demanded recognition of the imperial constitution and the dismissal of "anti-people" officers. The commander of the fortress had the leaders of the assembly arrested on 11 May, but this led to a mutiny. Baden's Minister of War, Hoffmann, marched to Rastatt with other troops to crush them, but most of the soldiers accompanying him also switched over to the side of the revolutionaries.

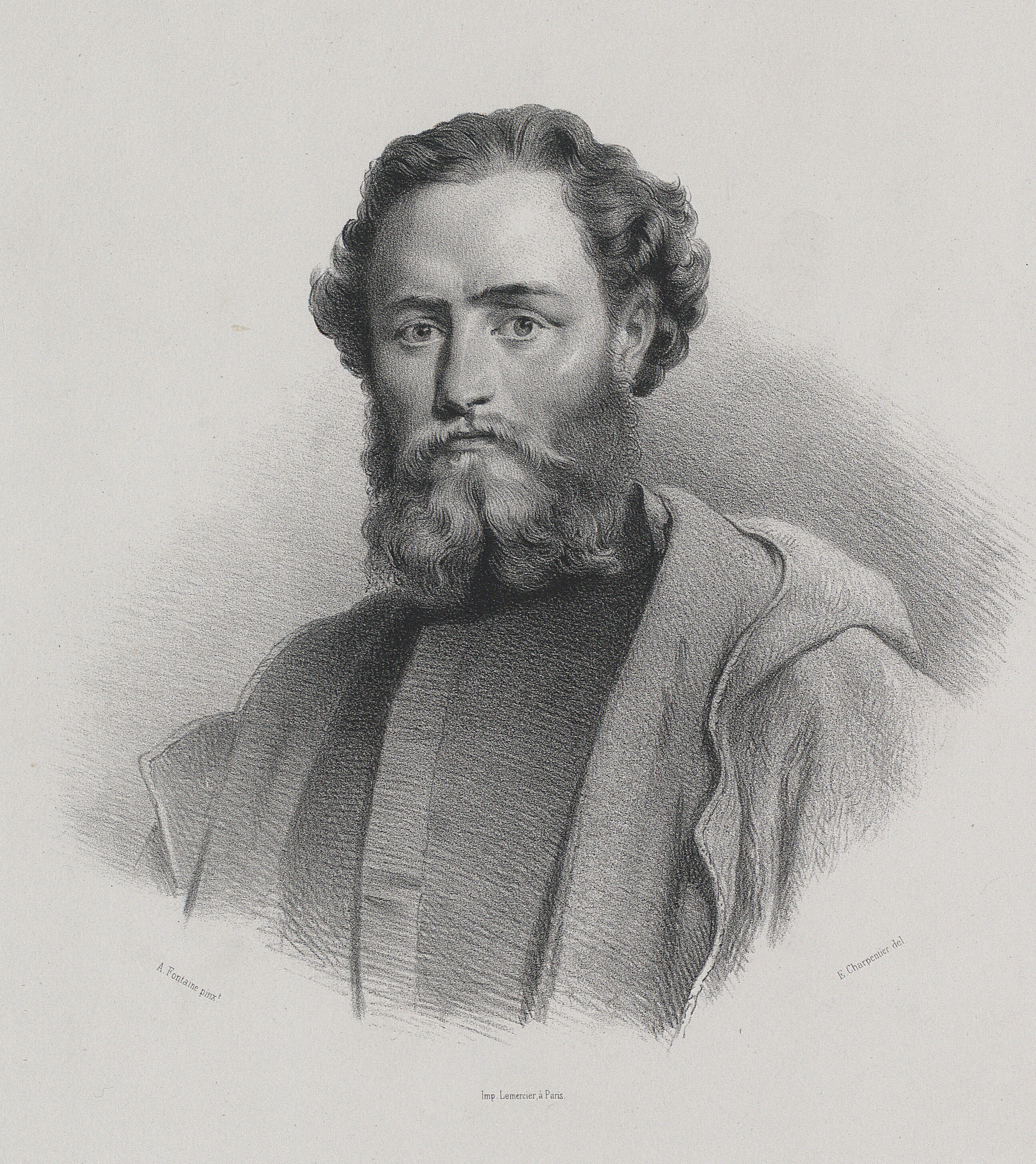
Mieroslawski, commander of the Baden Revolutionary Army in 1849

In the days that followed all the other garrisons in the country joined. As a result, Grand Duke Leopold had to leave the country and fled with his family and his government to the federal fortress at Mainz. Revolutionaries also took power in the neighbouring Bavarian Palatinate, and the two revolutionary governments formed a military union that raised an army of 20-25,000 men. In addition to the former troops of the regular Baden Army and the people's militias of the larger cities, the revolutionary army was also joined by volunteers from other European countries and numerous people from Württemberg. Among the latter was Fritz Heuss, great-great uncle of Theodor Heuss. A Polish commander of the army, Ludwik Mierosławski, was appointed. The former First Lieutenant Karl Eichfeld became Minister of War, but the War Ministry itself was severely restricted in its ability to act due to the flight of numerous officials. Two attempts to invade Hesse with the revolutionary troops and to offer military protection to the St. Paul's Church Parliament failed: firstly because the Hessian military and population proved to be less revolutionary than expected and, secondly, because the Badenese troops only wanted to defend their own country.

Precautions for the defence had to be taken soon, because federal troops under Prussian leadership were mobilised to suppress the Baden Revolution and its government. Prussia improvised two corps for this, which were divided into seven divisions and numbered almost 35,000 men. Another 18,000 armed men were combined into the "Neckar Corps" and consisted of contingents from several other German states. Their overall commander-in-chief was the Prince of Prussia, later Emperor William I, who since the March Revolution in Berlin had been nicknamed the "Prince of Grapeshot" (Kartätschenprinz).

The attack on Baden was carried out on two fronts: the I Prussian Corps under Moritz von Hirschfeld was to secure the Palatinate and then cross the Rhine and attack the Revolutionary Army concentrated in North Baden from the west, while the II Corps under Karl von der Groeben and Eduard von Peucker's Neckar Corps were to invade Baden from the north, so that the Baden Army as a whole would be sandwiched between the Rivers Neckar and Rhine. The advance of I Corps was highly successful, the Palatinate was quickly overcome and, from 15 June Prussian troops were in front of Mannheim, where they were initially stopped by artillery in the Battle of Ludwigshafen. Instead, they managed to cross the Rhine further south at Germersheim on 20 June and were then able to threaten the Baden Revolutionary Army from the south. The successes of the Baden Army against II Corps and the Neckar Corps, whose advance had been stopped at the Neckar, were thus negated. Mieroslawski switched the main effort of his troops to the south and attacked the outnumbered 1st Prussian Division on 21 June at the Battle of Waghäusel. The insurgents captured the two villages of Waghäusel and Wiesental (today both belong to Waghäusel) and pushed the Prussians back to Philippsburg. However, when the 4th Prussian Division arrived as reinforcements, the Revolutionary Army was routed. A total of 21 Prussian soldiers lost their lives, 100 were wounded and 130 went missing.

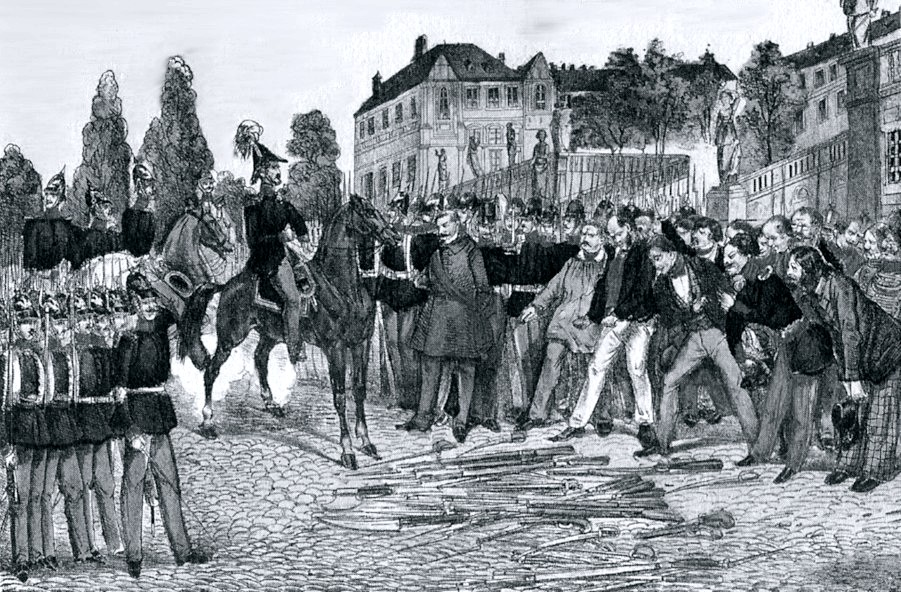
Capitulation of the rebel garrison of Rastatt to troops of the German Confederation on 23 July 1849

The defeat at Waghäusel weakened the discipline and cohesion of the Revolutionary Army, and individual units withdrew. On 22 June, the Federal Army's Neckar arm finally crossed the Neckar and threatened Mieroslawski's right flank. However, the commander of the Revolutionary Army managed to escape the encirclement and withdraw his troops behind the River Murg near Rastatt. On the Murg, however, the Revolutionary Army opposed the now united federal army, and after several skirmishes it largely broke up. The government of Baden fled from Karlsruhe to Rastatt and from there via Offenburg to Freiburg. Mierowslaski asked for his release on 1 July and was replaced by Franz Sigel. However, since coherent resistance was no longer an option, Sigel's main task was to save the remaining troops from being captured. Freiburg was occupied on 7 July, and on 11 July the Revolutionary Army crossed the Rhine into Switzerland.

Only about 6,000 men remained and they were trapped in Rastatt Fortress under Gustav Tiedemann and they continued to resist. The Prussian, General Karl von der Groeben, offered the rebel commander, Otto von Corvin, a chance to assess the situation outside the fortress, in Freiburg and Konstanz. Corvin accepted, and when, after his return, he reported to the besieged that there was no trace of the Revolutionary Army to be found, the revolutionaries laid down their arms on 23 July and were taken prisoner.

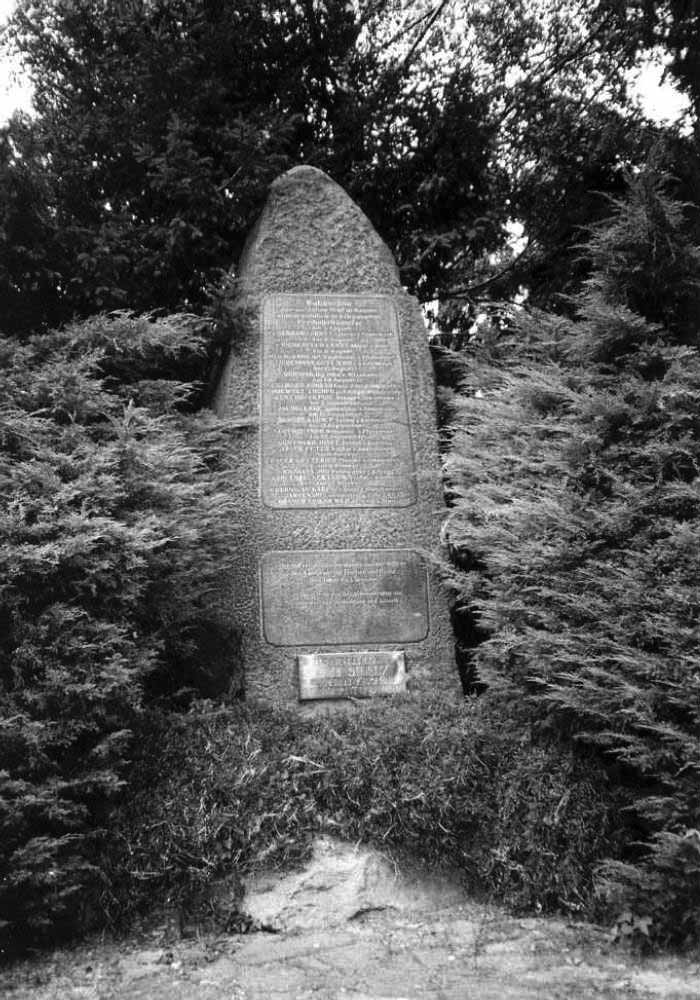
Memorial to those executed in Rastatt in 1849

After the Baden Revolution was suppressed, 51 death sentences and 715 ten-year prison sentences were pronounced. The sentences were imposed by Prussian courts martial and often appear harsh and arbitrary. The aim was probably to act as a deterrent beyond Baden's borders, but another result was resentment by the people of Baden against the Prussians and their military. A commemorative medal issued by Grand Duke Leopold became popularly known as the "fratricide medal" (Brudermordmedaille).

Numerous members of the Baden Revolutionary Army fled to the United States as Forty-Eighters and served in the American Civil War with the Union Army. Several natives of Baden and revolutionaries achieved the rank of general: Franz Sigel became a major general and general officer commanding of an army corps, Max (von) Weber commanded a division as a brigadier general and August Mersy had a brigade in the rank of colonel. All three had been officers in the Baden Army before the revolution and had graduated from the Karlsruhe Military Academy.

== Wars of Unification ==
=== Reorganisation of the army ===
The Baden Army was dissolved and completely reorganized under pressure from Prussia. Commissions checked the entire personnel, whereby 700 were placed in detention, 300 of them non -commissioned officers. In addition, military courts of honour were set up, which released around a third of the Baden Army's officer corps from the Army. Some were also moved to Prussia for re-training. When the Army was remodelled, no regiments were formed; instead, the new Baden Army was divided into ten infantry battalions, three cavalry units (Reiterdepots) and five gun batteries. This changed when Frederick I became first Regent and then Grand Duke. In 1852, the old regiments were reformed (the cavalry as early as 1850), the conscription law of 1825 came back into force, and in 1861 the Army was expanded by an additional regiment, so that the structure in 1861 was as follows:

Infantry	Cavalry	Artillery
1st Baden Life Guard Grenadiers (1. Badisches Leib-Grenadierregiment No. 109)	1st Baden Life Guard Dragoons (1. Badisches Leib-Dragonerregiment No. 20)	Field Artillery Regiment (1 mounted, 4 field batteries)
2nd Baden Grenadiers (King of Prussia's Own) (2. Badisches Grenadierregiment "Kaiser Wilhelm I." No. 110)	2nd Baden Dragoons (Margrave Maximilian's Own) (2. Badisches Dragonerregiment No. 21)	Fortress Artillery Battalion
3rd Infantry Regiment (3. Infanterieregiment)	3rd Dragoons (Prince Charles' Own) (3. Badisches Dragonerregiment "Prinz Karl" No. 22)	
4th Infantry Regiment (Prince William's Own) (4. Infanterieregiment Prinz Wilhelm)		
5th Infantry Regiment (5. Infanterieregiment)		
2 fusilier battalions and a Jäger battalion		

Baden also had to furnish a 15,000-man contingent for the VIII Federal Army Corps of the German Confederation. Commander-in-chief of the Army was the Grand Duke, as before; its management was vested in the Ministry of War headed by the War Minister (Kriegspräsident). The Ministry of War was divided into a military, an administrative (responsible for catering, payment, medical services, etc.) and legal department (rechtsgelehrte) and had other departments such as the War Treasury, the Directorate of Armouries, the Directorate of Magazines and others.

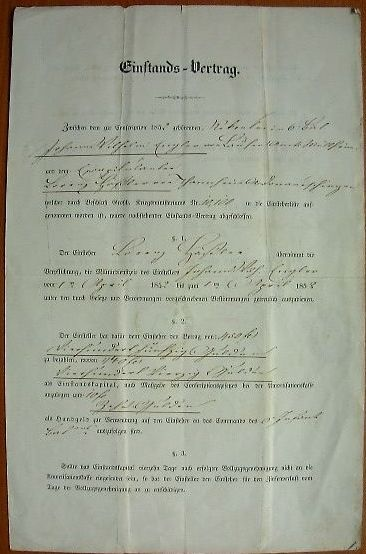
A deed of deputisation, 1852

Under the 1825 conscription act, there was general conscription for men, which began when they reached the age of 20 and for the enforcement of which the Grand Duchy was divided into three recruitment districts, Freiburg, Karlsruhe and Mannheim. The period of service was six years. Between 1849 and 1855, an average of slightly under than 12,000 young men were subject to compulsory military service each year, of whom an average of around 3,500 were actually conscripted. From the age of 17, voluntary service was possible; it was also possible to do military service in such a way that you served a full year and then stood by as a reserve in case of war. One way of avoiding military service was by deputising as an Einsteher: there were associations that organised a deputy in return for a fee and, in the event of a draft, the deputy came forward to serve. In this way, the sons of wealthier citizens could avoid military service, while poorer men were able to earn a living as deputies.

From 1857 onwards, the infantry was equipped with the Vereinsgewehr 1857 ("union rifle") jointly procured by Baden, Hesse and Württemberg. This was a muzzle-loader with a 0.54 calibre rifled barrel and percussion lock.

=== Austro-Prussian War ===
The tensions between Prussia and Austria in the 1860s put Baden in a precarious position. On the one hand, there was a close connection between the Prussian and Baden dynastic houses: Grand Duke Frederick had married Princess Louise of Prussia in 1856 and was therefore a son-in-law of the Prussian King William. Politically, Frederick had also tended to side with Prussia in federal affairs, with the support of his foreign minister Franz von Roggenbach, who advocated the Lesser Germany solution. However, the anti-liberal attitude of the Minister President of Prussia, Otto von Bismarck, turned the Badenese liberals against Prussia. They repeatedly expressed their solidarity with their Prussian party comrades, which finally led to the resignation of the Roggenbachs in 1865 and the appointment of the liberal, pro-Austrian Ludwig von Edelsheim. When the tensions surrounding the Schleswig-Holstein question escalated in 1866, the Grand Duchy initially remained neutral; however, when Prussia left the German Confederation, the armed conflict became a federal execution that the Grand Duchy could not escape, especially since the neighbouring kingdoms of Württemberg and Bavaria both sided with Austria and the people of Baden also had no sympathy for Prussia and its king after 1849. The 10,000-strong Baden Army contingent moved out and formed the 2nd Division of VIII Army Corps under Prince Alexander of Hesse-Darmstadt.

Order of Battle of VIII Corps in 1866 in a contemporary depiction

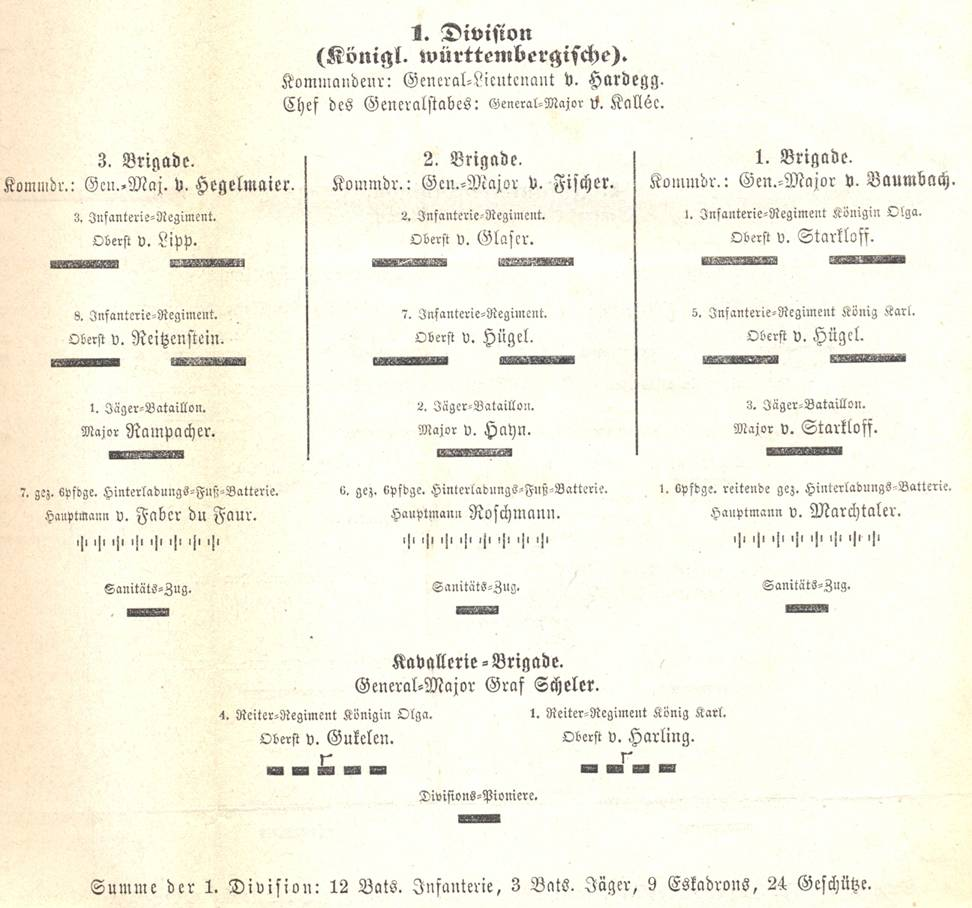

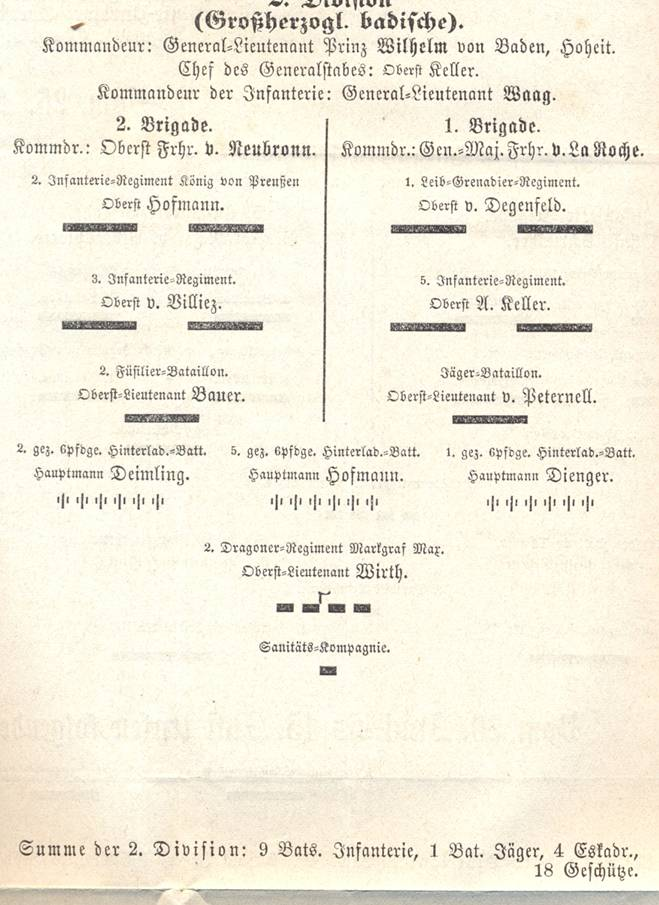

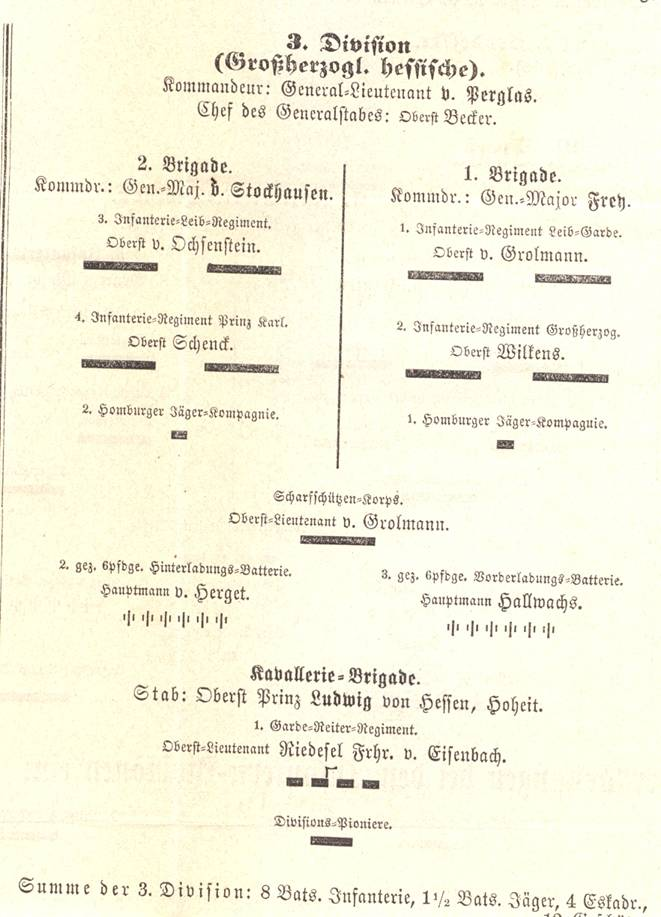

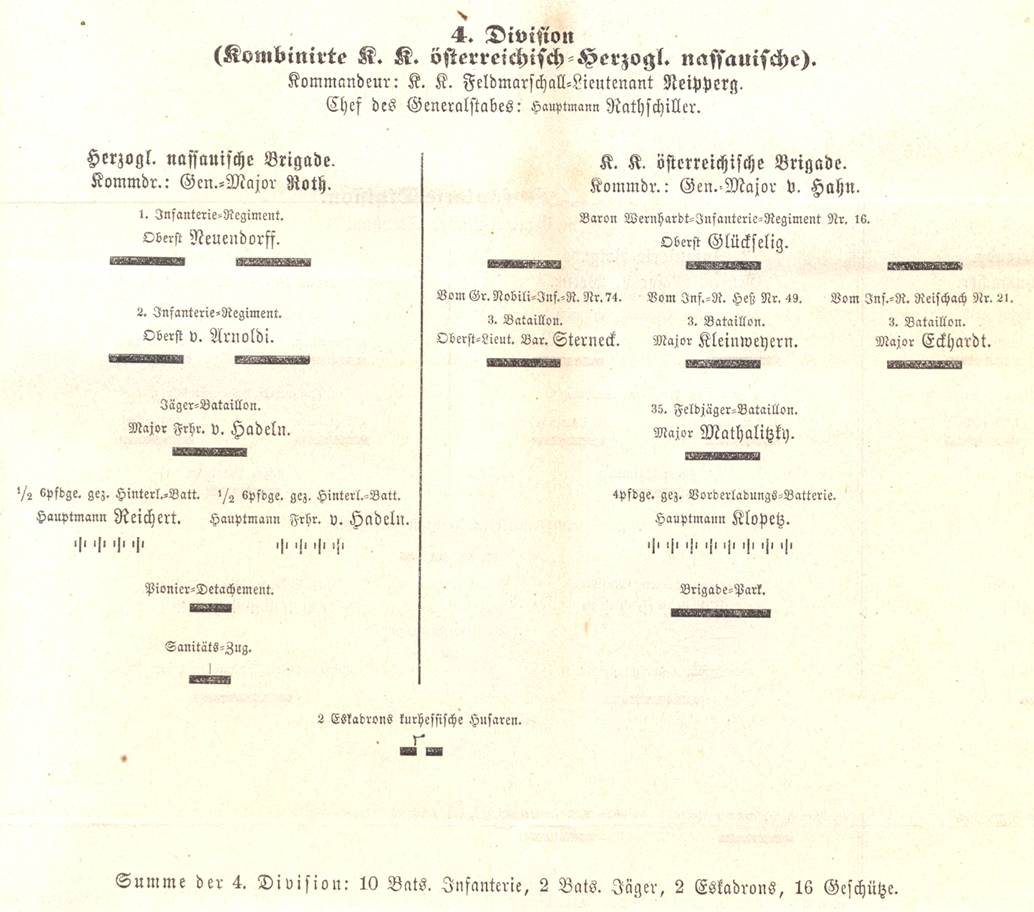

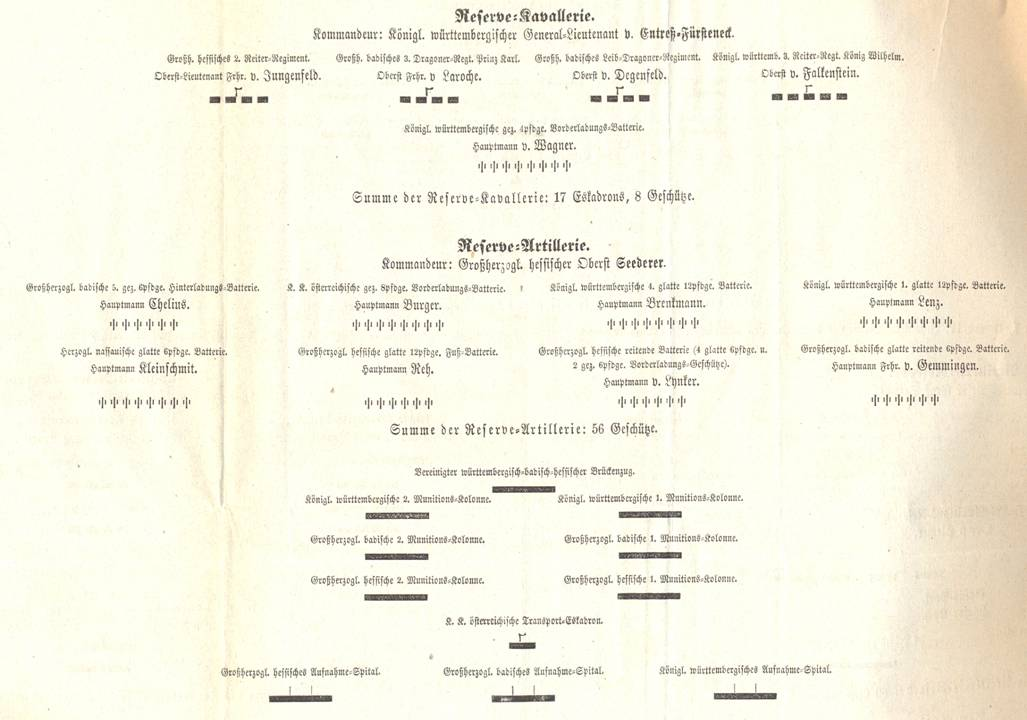

The VIII Corps took part in the Campaign of the Main during the Austro-Prussian War. When the Corps retreated to the River Tauber, Badenese troops were involved in the battles at Hundheim (23 July), Werbach (24 July) and Gerchsheim (25 July). Problems were caused by the fact that Prussian and Baden uniforms were very similar, so that the people of Baden had to march in winter coats to avoid confusion. Overall, participation in the Austro-Prussian War claimed the lives of 27 Baden soldiers, while around 200 were wounded.

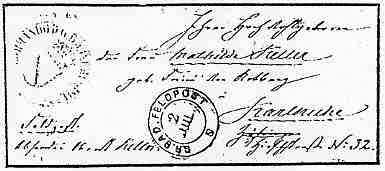
A Baden field letter dated 2 July 1866

Even before Badenese troops had contact with the enemy for the first time, the war was de facto decided at the Battle of Königgrätz. For this reason, there was a debate in Baden throughout July as to whether and when the Grand Duchy should join the Prussian cause. The cabinet under Ludwig von Edelsheim was replaced by a new, Lesser Germany-minded one led by Julius Jolly and Karl Mathy. On 29 July, the Badenese troops began to withdraw home, and on 3 August, an armistice was concluded between Baden and Prussia, limited to 22 August. As early as 17 August, Otto von Bismarck and Rudolf von Freydorf concluded a peace treaty between the Grand Duchy and Prussia. Baden had to pay reparations of 6 million guldens, and the two states concluded a secret defence and attack alliance (Schutz- und Trutzbündnis). This alliance included, among other things, that the Baden Army would come under Prussian command in the event of a joint war.

In the period that followed, there was another reorganization of the Army, closely based on the Prussian model. The option of having a deputy was abolished, instead there was now a seven-year compulsory service in the army (of which the last four were in the reserve), followed by five years of service in the Landwehr. The Prussian general Gustav Friedrich von Beyer became the Badenese Minister of War, the Army was equipped and enlarged with Prussian needle guns and breech-loading rifles. Its structure in 1869 was as follows:

Infantry	Cavalry	Artillery	Landwehr
1st Life Guard Regiment (1. Leibgrenadierregiment)	1st Life Guard Dragoons (1. Leibdragonerregiment)	Field Artillery Regiment (1 mounted, 4 field batteries)	10 battalions
2nd Grenadiers (King of Prussia's Own) (2. Grenadierregiment König von Preußen)	2nd Dragoons (Margrave Maximilian's Own) (2. Dragoon Regiment Margrave Maximilian)	Fortress Artillery Battalion	
3rd Infantry Regiment (3. Infanterieregiment)	3rd Dragoons (Prince Charles' Own) (3. Dragonerregiment Prinz Karl)		
4th Infantry Regiment (Prince Williams' Own) (4. Infanterieregiment Prinz Wilhelm)			
5th Infantry Regiment (5. Infanterieregiment)			
6th Infantry Regiment (6. Infanterieregiment)			

=== Franco-Prussian War ===
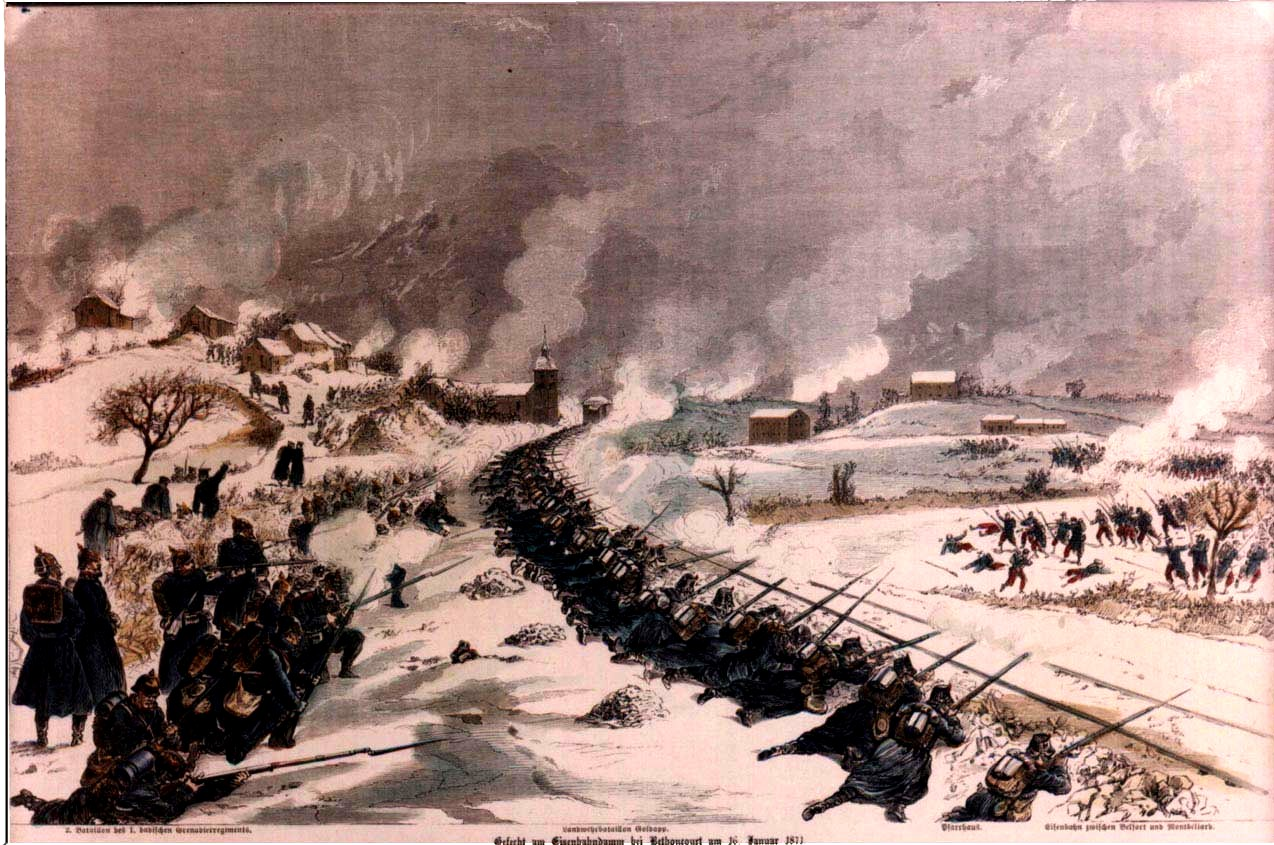
Battle of the Lizaine, painting by J.P.Néri

An alliance between Baden and Prussia occurred less than four years after the treaty of 1866 as a result of the Franco-Prussian War. As early as 15 July 1870, just two days after the Ems Dispatch, the Grand Duchy mobilised its troops, and a week later the government considered the alliance to have come into effect. The Baden Army formed a field division, which comprised almost the entire army with 13 infantry battalions, 12 cavalry squadrons and 54 guns and was placed under General Gustav Friedrich von Beyer. Together with Württembergian, Bavarian and Prussian troops, the division formed the 3rd Army under the command of Prussian Crown Prince Frederick. After securing the Upper Rhine, the Badenese division was deployed in August 1870 as part of General August von Werder's siege corps in the Siege of Strasbourg, which ended on 27 September with the surrender of the fortress.

Subsequently Werder's formation, now designated as the XIV Army Corps, was deployed against newly raised French troops in south-eastern France. In October, the Corps advanced on Dijon, which resulted in several skirmishes. On 18 December, two Badenese brigades were victorious in the Battle of Nuits, but lost 940 men. In January, they took part in the Battle of the Lisaine, where the XIV Army Corps faced the army of General Charles Denis Bourbaki, which was three times larger. From 15 to 17 January Bourbaki attacked, with the fighting from 16 January mainly being concentrated on the right wing, where the Badenese division had taken up position. In heavy fighting, which cost the Badenese division 855 men, the French attacks were finally repelled; Bourbaki's army retreated to Besançon and from there to Switzerland, where it was interned. With Bourbaki's defeat, there was no hope of relief for the besieged Fortress at Belfort, which surrendered on 16 February 1871.

== Service within the Imperial Army ==
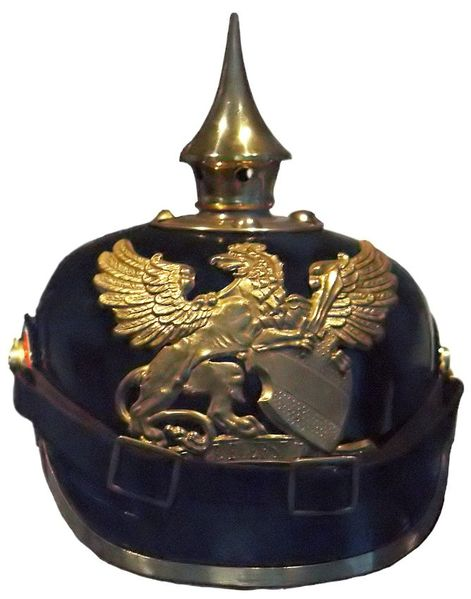
A Pickelhaube embellished with Baden's coat of arms

Following the victorious Battle of Sedan, the Badenese government proposed Baden's accession to the North German Confederation in a memorandum to Bismarck. Three weeks later, on Bismarck's recommendation, an official application for accession was submitted and, together with Bavaria and Württemberg, the new German Empire was constituted with William's proclamation as emperor. On 18 January 1871, the treaties between the various states was ratified and, in March, the imperial constitution was adopted.

By contrast with Württemberg and Bavaria, the Grand Duchy finally ceded military sovereignty to Prussia. On 25 November 1870, a military convention was signed with the Kingdom of Prussia at Versailles. According to this, the Baden Army became "an immediate part of the German or Royal Prussian Army" (Article 1). The regiments kept their standards and flags and were referred to as the "Baden Regiment", their crests showed the griffin of the Baden state coat of arms. Commanding General of the Badenese troops was the Grand Duke, the terms of service and oaths were somewhat more complicated: the Grand Duke was the employer for non-commissioned officers and men, and these were also sworn to him (with an additional obligation to obey the "Federal General ", i.e. the German Emperor). The officers, on the other hand, were subordinate to the German emperor and took their oath to him. The Grand Duke came second to them, to whom they pledged to "promote the best and to avert harm and disadvantage from the highest and his house and country". The corps number XIV assigned in the war against France was retained by the Badenese troops, they formed the core of the XIV Army Corps. In 1874, this was structured as follows:

division	brigade	regiment
28th Division		
	55th Infantry Brigade	
		1st Baden Life Guard Grenadiers (1. Badisches Leibgrenadierregiment Nr. 109)
		2nd Baden Life Guard Grenadiers (Emperor William's Own) (2. Badisches Grenadierregiment "Kaiser Wilhelm I." Nr. 110)
		2nd Baden Landwehr (2. Badisches Landwehrregiment Nr. 110)
	56th Infantry Brigade	
		1st Upper Silesian Infantry (Keith's Own) (Infanterie-Regiment "Keith" (1. Oberschlesisches) Nr. 22)
		3rd Baden Infantry (Margrave Louis William's Own) (3. Badisches Infanterie-Regiment "Markgraf Ludwig Wilhelm" Nr. 111)
		3rd Baden Landwehr (3. Badisches Landwehrregiment Nr. 111)
	28th Cavalry Brigade	
		1st Baden Life Guard Dragoons (1. Badisches Leibdragonerregiment Nr. 20)
		3rd Baden Dragoons (Prince Charles' Own) (3. Badisches Dragonerregiment "Prinz Karl" Nr. 22)
29th Division		
	57th Infantry Brigade	
		5th Baden Infantry (5. Badisches Infanterieregiment Nr. 113)
		6th Baden Infantry (Emperor Frederick III's Own) (6. Badisches Infanterieregiment "Kaiser Friedrich III." Nr. 114)
		5th and 6th Baden Landwehr (5. und 6. Badisches Landwehr-Regiment (Nr. 113 und 114))
	58th Infantry Brigade	
		4th Westphalian Infantry (Count Barfuß) (Infanterie-Regiment "Graf Barfuß" (4. Westfälisches) Nr. 17)
		4th Baden Infantry (Prince William's Own) (4. Badisches Infanterie-Regiment "Prinz Wilhelm" Nr. 112)
		4th Baden Landwehr (4. Badisches Landwehrregiment Nr. 112)
	29th Cavalry Brigade	
		14th Mark Dragoons (Kurmärkisches Dragoner-Regiment Nr. 14)
		2nd Baden Dragoons (2. Badisches Dragonerregiment Nr. 21)
Corps troops		
		14th Baden Field Artillery Battalion (Badisches Fußartillerie-Bataillon Nr. 14)
		14th Baden Engineer Battalion (Badisches Pionier-Bataillon Nr. 14)
		14th Baden Baggage Train Battalion (Badisches Train-Bataillon Nr. 14)
	14th Field Artillery Brigade	
		1st Baden Field Artillery Regiment (Grand Duke's Own) (Feldartillerie-Regiment "Großherzog" (1. Badisches) Nr. 14)
		2nd Baden Field Artillery Regiment (2. Badisches Feldartillerie-Regiment Nr. 30)

With the military convention of 1870, Baden gave up its military sovereignty, the Baden Army ceased to exist and became part of the Imperial German Army, albeit as a separate corps. After Germany's defeat in the First World War this concentration of Badenese troops was also dissolved; in the new Reichswehr only the 14th (Baden) Infantry Regiment carried forward the tradition of the old Badenese regiments.

== Baden Ministers of War ==
In 1808 the responsibility of the former War Commission (Kriegskommission) was transferred to the newly created Ministry of War (Kriegsministerium). The following Ministers of War held office:

- 7 March 1808 to 17 September 1808 Karl von Geusau
- 1808–1814 Karl Friedrich von Fischer (management)
- 16 August 1814 to 4 Dezember 1833 Konrad von Schäffer
- 9 December 1833 to 22 March 1848 Karl Wilhelm Eugen von Freydorf
- 22 March 1848 bis 9 June 1849 General Friedrich Hoffmann
- 16 June 1849 to 7 April 1854 August von Roggenbach
- 17 May 1854 to 13 February 1868 Damian Ludwig
- 13 February 1868 to 29 June 1871 Gustav Friedrich von Beyer

The Grand Duchy of Baden Ministry of War was disbanded by statute on 27 December 1871.

== Literature ==
- Philipp Röder von Diersburg, ed. (1864): Denkwürdigkeiten des Generals der Infanterie Markgrafen Wilhelm von Baden aus den Feldzügen 1809 bis 1815. Nach dessen hinterlassenen eigenhändigen Aufzeichnungen. Mit Noten und Beilagen. A. Bielefeld's Hofbuchhandlung, Karlsruhe, work/mode/2up bub_gb_MZNBAAAAcAAJ at the Internet Archive
- Frank Engehausen (2008). Kleine Geschichte des Großherzogtums Baden. G. Braun Buchverlag, Karlsruhe, ISBN 978-3-7650-8328-0
- Frank Engehausen (2010). Kleine Geschichte der Revolution 1848/49 in Baden. G. Braun Buchverlag, Karlsruhe, ISBN 978-3-7650-8596-3.
- Siegfried Fiedler: Das Militärwesen Badens in der Zeit Napoleons. In: Baden und Württemberg im Zeitalter Napoleons. Württembergisches Landesmuseum (publ.), supplementary volume, Stuttgart 1987, pp. 255–273.
- Hans-Joachim Harder: Militärgeschichtliches Handbuch Baden-Württemberg. Militärgeschichtliches Forschungsamt (ed.), Kohlhammer, Stuttgart 1987, ISBN 3-17-009856-X.
- Angelika Hauser-Hauswirth (ed.): Wege der Revolutionäre. Wanderrouten Deutsche Revolution in Baden 1848/49. LpB Baden-Württemberg 1998.
- Adam Ignaz Valentin Heunisch, Joseph Bader: Das Großherzogthum Baden, historisch-geographisch-statistisch-topographisch beschrieben. Heidelberg 1857, this work at the Internet Archive
- Armin Kohnle: Kleine Geschichte der Markgrafschaft Baden. Leinfelden-Echterdingen 2007, ISBN 978-3-7650-8346-4.
- Karl Stiefel: Baden – 1648–1952. Vol. II, Karlsruhe 1979, pp. 989–1039.
- Max Ritter von Xylander: Das Heer-Wesen der Staaten des deutschen Bundes. Vol. 1. 2nd edn. Kollmann, Augsburg 1842; this work at the Internet Archive
- Ludwig Scharf: Uniformes du Grand-Duché de Bade, 1835–1851. gallica
- Wilhelm Krieg von Hochfelden: Geschichtliche Darstellung sämmtlicher Begebenheiten und Kriegsvorfälle der Großherzoglich Badischen Truppen in Spanien, 1808 bis Ende 1813. Freiburg [undated, 1823?] 226 pp.
- Bernhard von Poten: Geschichte des Militär-Erziehungs- und Bildungswesens in den Landen deutscher Zunge. Hofmann, Berlin 1889–1900, Vol. 1 (1889), Allgemeine Übersicht, Baden, Bayern, Braunschweig, Colmar. here pp. 17–50; this work at the Internet Archive (page n29)
- Veteranen-Chronik der Krieger Badens. Karlsruhe 1843 digital copy by UB Freiburg
- Karl-Heinz Lutz: Das badische Offizierskorps 1840–1870/71. 1997, In: Veröffentlichung der Kommission für geschichtliche Landeskunde in Baden-Wuerttemberg. Series B: Forschungen. 135th vol., ISBN 978-3-17-013146-0.
- Das großherzogliche Armeekorps im Jahre 1843. In: Universal-Lexikon vom Großherzogthum Baden. 2nd, low cost edition, revised and published by a group of scholars and friends of the Fatherland. Karlsruhe, 1847. Columns 75–105 Google digitalisation
- Wehrgeschichtliches Museum Rastatt (publ.) Unter dem Greifen – Altbadisches Militär von der Vereinigung der Markgrafschaften bis zur Reichsgründung 1771-1871 – Rastatt 1984
