= Kerstenhausen =

Coordinates: 51°3′49.7538″N 9°12′59.54″E

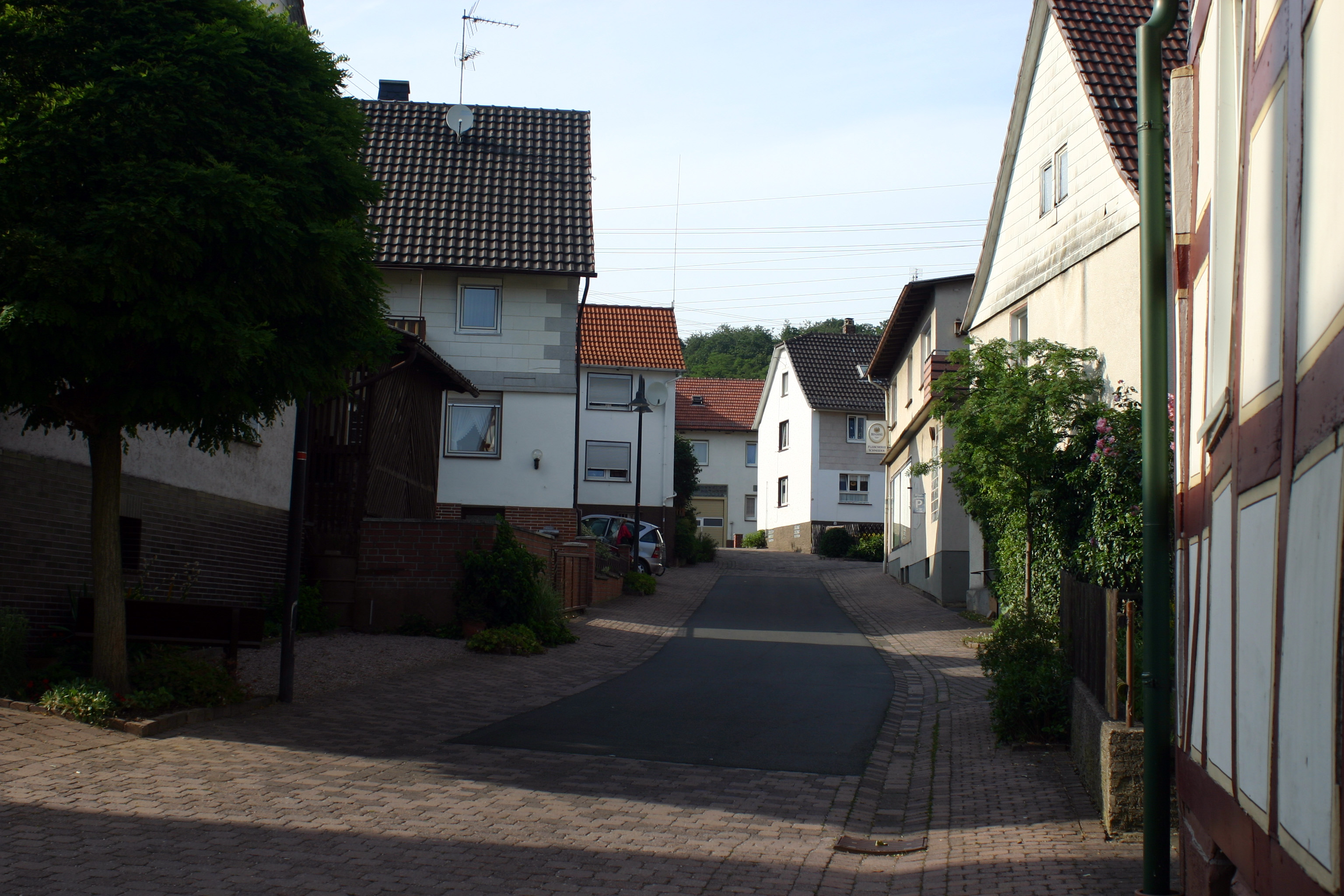
Kerstenhausen

Kerstenhausen is a village of about 600 inhabitants and since 1974, it's a constituent part of the town of Borken (Hesse, Germany). It had its first documentary mention in 1044 as Christinehysen. The document, issued by Gandersheim Abbey, is today preserved in the State Archive in Lucerne.

== History ==
In 1344, the Margarethenkirche (St. Margaret's Church) had its first documentary mention. Kleinkerstenhausen lay to one side of the road that today runs between Arnsbach and Kerstenhausen. Over the course of the centuries, Kleinkerstenhausen shrank to a single farmstead, and in 1578 it had its last documentary mention, at least as a living community. The Margarethenkirche fell into ruins.
