= Merrebach =

River in Germany

Location
- Country: Germany
- States: Hesse

Physical characteristics
- Mouth
  - location: Olmes
  - coordinates: 51.0175°N 9.2632°E

Basin features
- Progression: Olmes→ Schwalm→ Eder→ Fulda→ Weser→ North Sea

Merrebach is a small river of Hesse, Germany. It flows into the Olmes south of Borken.

== See also ==
- List of rivers of Hesse
