= Arnsbach =

Arnsbach may refer to:

- Arnsbach, Borken, a community of the town Borken, Hesse, Germany
- Arnsbach (Usa), a river of Hesse, Germany, tributary of the Usa
