= Heinrich von Porbeck =

Heinrich Philipp Reinhard von Porbeck (born 15 October 1771 in Cassel; died 28 July 1809 at Talavera) was a Baden major general and military writer.

== Life ==
Porbeck's father (né Boedicker) was of middle-class origin. He had been adopted by an uncle and was thenceforth known as von Porbeck. On his father's estate of Kalbsburg near Fritzlar (today part of the city of Borken) Heinrich was taught academically by tutors. At his father's request, he first studied cameralism, but when he turned 18, his father gave in to his wishes to be allowed to join the military and (like his father) entered the service of the Landgrave of Hesse-Cassel. In 1787, he became a Fahnenjunker in the Guard Regiment, in 1790 he was promoted to ensign and finally, in 1792, to adjutant for General Wurmb. In this role he fought in the War of the First Coalition against revolutionary France until 1795.

After the war he wrote a book entitled Kritische Geschichte der Operationen zur Verteidigung Hollands 1794–95 (Critical History of Operations for the Defence of Holland, 1794-95, Brunswick 1802-04), which became highly controversial in the years that followed. He had been active as a writer since 1798 and published articles in the Neues militärisches Journal (New Military Journal) of Prussian Army reformer, Scharnhorst. He then worked as editor of the magazine Neue Bellona.

In the meantime he had been appointed as a lieutenant quartermaster on the Hessian general staff and attained the rank of first lieutenant. But since 1801, when he was transferred to Marburg to the position he had held before the war, he had been thinking about entering the service of another prince. Thanks to the mediation of his wartime comrade, Colonel von Baumbach he transferred to the Baden Army in 1803. Here he became a captain and aide-de-camp. His father and brother also entered Baden service at this time.

In September 1803, he became a member of the War Ministry and a commission for the reform of the Baden army. He quickly rose to the rank of lieutenant colonel and commander of the new Life Guard Grenadier Regiment (Leib-Grenadier-Regiment). With this unit, another battalion and a squadron, he took part in 1807 in Napoleon's war against Prussia at the Siege of Stralsund. After that, in 1808, he was briefly chief of the Baden general staff. In August 1808, Porbeck was appointed major general in command of the Baden contingent that went to the war against Spain as part of General François-Joseph Lefebvre's IV Corps. There he took command of the 1st Brigade in the Lewal's Division. This he led in the battles of Zornoza (31 October 1808) and Valmaseda (18 November 1808). In December, the brigade moved into Madrid. In March 1809, Porbeck distinguished himself again in the battles at Val de Cannas (19 March) and Medellin (28 March). On 28 July 1809 he fell at the Battle of Talavera while leading a bayonet charge on the English centre.

== Family ==
On 29 August 1798 he married Amalie Bornemann (1778–1813). The couple had several children:

- Friedrich Ernst Heinrich (1802–1867), lieutenant general

married Hannah Colman (1803–1844) in 1835, daughter of Arthur Colman
married Sophie Steinwachs (1824–1885) in 1846

- Ludwig Viktor (1805–1851), chargée d'affaires of the Baden embassy in Prussia
- Mathilde Caroline Amalie (* 1807), lady-in-waiting to Margravine Elisabeth, married Freiherr Friedrich von Reck (1792–1845), chamberlain and principal government official

== Literature ==
- Bernhard von Poten (1888). "Porbeck, Heinrich von" . Allgemeine Deutsche Biographie (in German). Vol. 26. Leipzig: Duncker & Humblot. pp. 438–441.
- Bernhard von Poten (ed.): Handwörterbuch der gesamten Militärwissenschaften. Vol. 8, Leipzig 1880.
- Österreichische Militärzeitschrift. 4/1838.
- Friedrich Cast: Historisches und genealogisches Adelsbuch des Grossherzogthums Baden. Section 2, Vol. 1, pp. 292 ff.
- Genealogisches Taschenbuch der Ritter- u. Adels-Geschlechter 1879. 4th annual, p. 428.
