= Borken =

Borken may refer to:

- Borken, North Rhine-Westphalia
- Borken (district), in North Rhine-Westphalia
- Borken, Hesse
