= Großenenglis =

Coordinates: 51°04′42″N 9°16′32″E

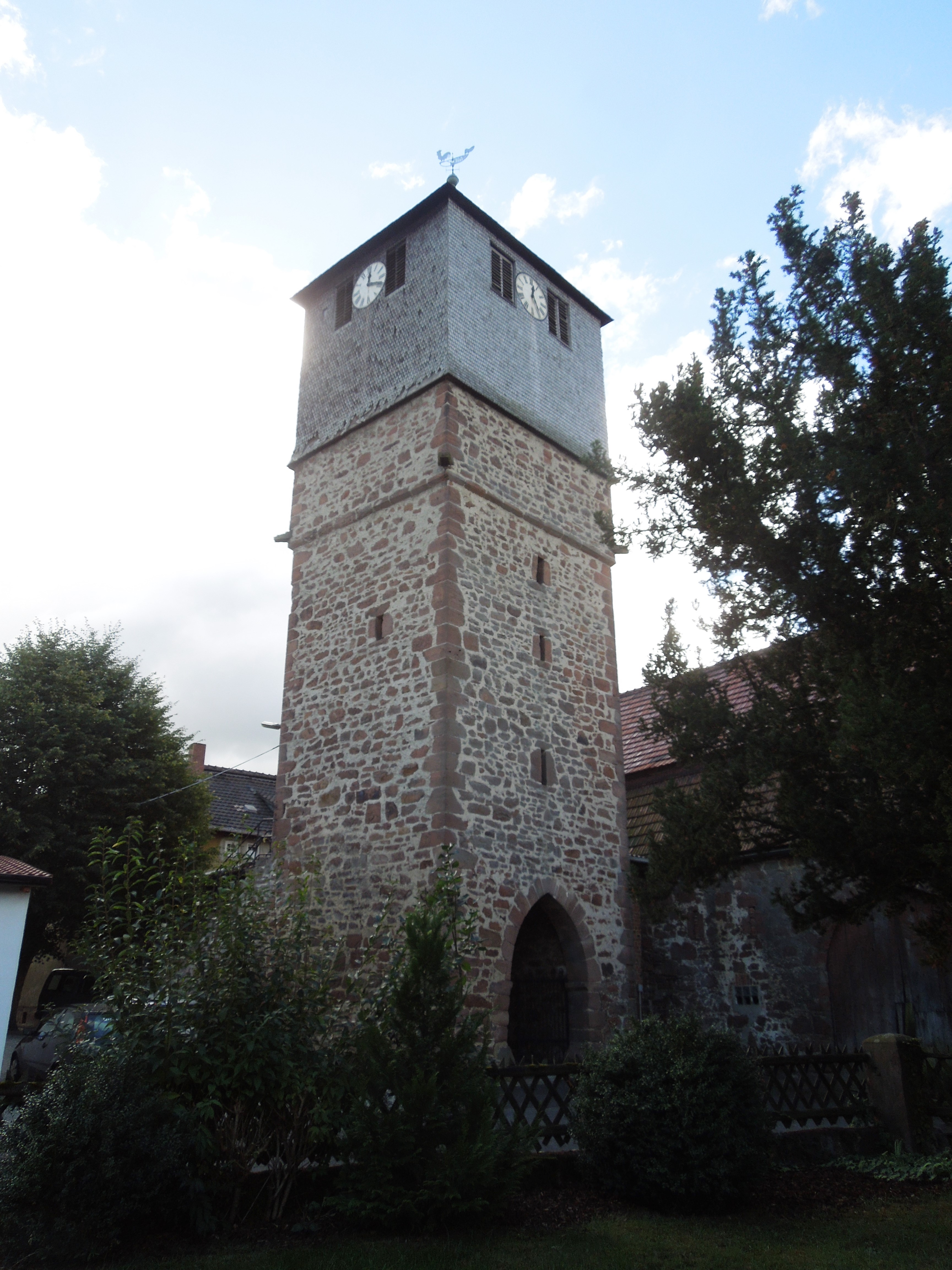

The formerly independent community of Großenenglis has been since its amalgamation with Borken in 1974 with its population then of 1,190 the northernmost and largest by land area (988 ha) of Borken's constituent communities.

The following constituent communities are in direct neighbourhood. In the south is Gombeth, in the west Kleinenglis and in the east Udenborn (among to the municipal of Wabern).

== History ==
Großenenglis's first documentary mention came in 775 under the name "Angelgise" in the Breviarium sancti Lulli, the Hersfeld Abbey Goods Directory. In 1125, the village was known as "Engilgis", and in 1225 as "Engilgis major", thereby distinguishing it from the neighbouring village of Kleinenglis.

In 1951, a southern neighbourhood, with 34 households, had to make way for the "Altenburg II" brown coal mine. A new settlement was built in the upper village.

With a celebratory programme from 31 May to 4 June 2000, and the publication of a book, the town marked the 1,225th anniversary of its first documentary mention.

In Großenenglis, the theologian Marianne Hartung, née Pisch, was born and grew up. Her main work, "Angst und Schuld in Tiefenpsychologie und Theologie " ("Fear and Guilt in Depth Psychology and Theology"), came out in 1979.

== Historic buildings ==
- Church tower "Warte auf der Landwehr" (built 1431)
- Amtshaus (Sternstraße, built 1686)
- Rittergut Handt (stately house, built 1505 - 1515)
- Rittergut Kalbsburg (about 2 km north of town) with "Hohenenglis" tower and villa (built 1911 - 1913)
