= Borken, Hesse =

Borken
- Town
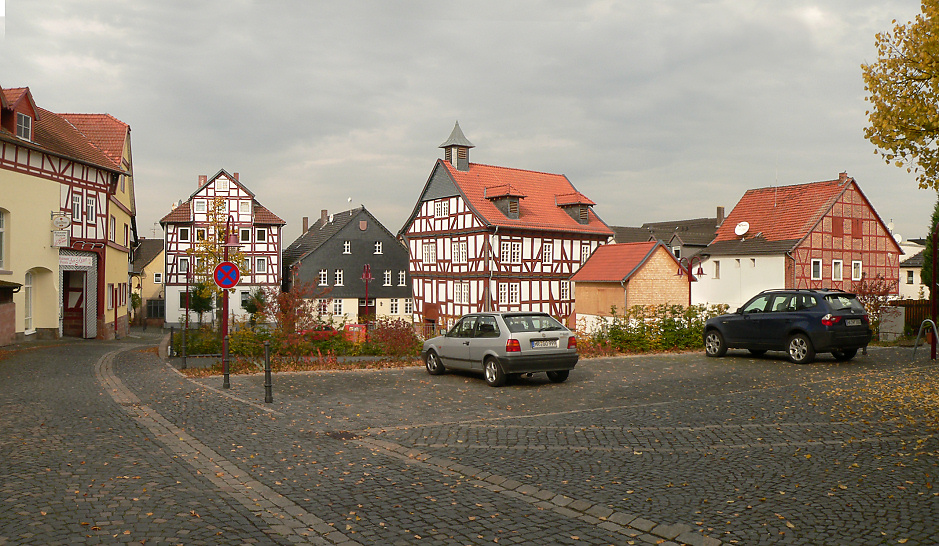
- Historic centre

- Coat of arms

- Location of Borken within Schwalm-Eder district
- Interactive map of Borken
- Location within Germany Location within Hesse
- Coordinates: 51°02′45″N 09°16′02″E
- Country: Germany
- State: Hesse
- Admin. region: Kassel
- District: Schwalm-Eder-Kreis
- Subdivisions: 14 Quarters

Government
  - Mayor (2021–27): Marcèl Pritsch (FW)

Area
  - Total: 82.46 km^{2} (31.84 sq mi)
- Elevation: 205 m (673 ft)

Population (2025-12-31)
  - Total: 12,232
  - Density: 148.3/km^{2} (384.2/sq mi)
- Time zone: UTC+01:00 (CET)
  - Summer (DST): UTC+02:00 (CEST)
- Postal codes: 34582
- Dialling codes: 05682
- Vehicle registration: HR
- Website: www.borken-hessen.de

Borken (German pronunciation: [ˈbɔʁkn̩]) is a small town with about 13,000 inhabitants in the Schwalm-Eder district in northern Hesse, Germany.

The town is a former centre for brown coal mining and coal-fired electrical generation in Hesse. The coalmine, unlike those in other regions, also had underground workings. After a major disaster – namely a coal dust explosion – the mine was shut down on 1 June 1988.

Since that time, the former coal pits have been redeveloped into recreation areas with lakes, nature areas – some actually protected by law – and sporting grounds. Among these areas are der Borkener See (Borken Lake) with its nature reserve, der Singliser See (Singlis Lake) with windsurfing, and die Stockelache ("Stagnant Puddle"), used as a bathing lake.

One particular attraction in Borken is the Hessian Brown Coal Mining Museum (Hessisches Braunkohle Bergbaumuseum) which displays the town's coal-mining tradition. Since 2003, an open-air museum, where visitors may learn about "coal and energy", has also been open. The museum is also affiliated with a nature conservation information centre for the Borkener See.

Borken's best known landmark is its watertower.

== Geography ==
=== Geographical location ===
The next towns to Borken are Fritzlar (15 km) in the northwest and Homberg (15 km) in the west. Within 50 km distance is Kassel the next large city in the north and with 55 km Marburg in the south.

Table: Using the area:
Utilization	Area in acre and Percent
Farming	11,873.41 (58.3 %)
Forest	4,262.58 (20.9 %)
Building	1,393.67 (6.9 %)
Traffic	1,322.01 (6.5 %)
Water	753.67 (3.7 %)
Companies	363.24 (1.8 %)
Recreations	108.73 (0.5 %)
Nature protection area	259.46 (1.4 %)
Summary	20,336.77 acres (82.3000 km^{2}) (100.0 %)

=== Geology ===
The municipal area is a part of natural region of the West Hesse Depression. The following sub-divisions of this natural region impinge on Borken:

- Landsburg Depression with the divisions:
  - Trockenerfurth Plain
  - Borken Basin
- Hessengau with the division:
  - Großenenglise Plateau

In the municipality of Borken are different rivers and streams. The best known river is the Schwalm and its tributary the Olmes (right side) with Merrebach, Lembach (right side) and Hundsbach (left side).

=== Using municipal area ===
The municipal area are 82.3 square kilometres or 8,230 hectare in metric orientated countries (f.e. Germany). In Anglophone based countries (f.e. United States or United Kingdom) 31.78 square miles or 20,336.77 ar. 11,873.41 ar were used by farming, 4,262.58 ar are forest, buildings for living are used 1,393.67 ar, the roads and railroad are using 1,322.01 ar, waterbodies using 753.67 ar, companies using 363.24 ar, for recreation 108.73 ar and 259.46 ar are nature protection area.

=== In the neighbourhood ===
Map of Borken, Hesse

The municipality of Borken is located adjacent to other municipalities: Fritzlar to its northwest, Wabern to its northeast, Homberg to its east, Frielendorf to its southeast, Neuental to its southwest, and Bad Zwesten to its west.

=== Quarters ===
The municipality of Borken (Hesse) has 14 quarters (in bracket the date of annexation):

- 1. Großenenglis (1 January 1974)
- 2. Gombeth (31 December 1971)
- 3. Singlis (31 December 1971)
- 4. Lendorf (31 December 1971)
- 5. Freudenthal (31 December 1971)
- 6. Pfaffenhausen (31 December 1971)
- 7. Stolzenbach (31 December 1971)
- 8. Dillich (31 December 1971)
- 9. Haarhausen (31 December 1971)
- 10. Nassenerfurth (1 January 1974)
- 11. Trockenerfurth (1 January 1974)
- 12. Arnsbach (1 January 1974)
- 13. Kleinenglis (1 January 1974)
- 14. Kerstenhausen (1 January 1974)

== History ==
=== Mining in Borken ===
In the Borken region in the 20th century, the most important brown coal deposit in Hesse was mined and used at a thermal power plant to generate electricity. With the end of the coal stocks, the Stolzenbach mine disaster in 1988 and the Borken Power Plant shutdown on 15 March 1991, this epoch in the region's history, which had lastingly shaped the economy, the landscape and the people, came to an end. Since then, the brown coal mining area has found itself the subject of a restructuring process by a service company.

In the 21st century, the "Borkener Seenland" ("Borken Lakeland") and the Hessian Brown Coal Mining Museum turned the landmarks and the legacy, as well as the coal-mining and power plant era into a leisure and museum area.

== Politics ==
=== Municipal council ===
The municipal council vote for the last two elections:

	2006				2001	
Party	Percentage	Seats	± Percentage	± Seats	Percentage	Seats
CDU	21.4%	8	− 1%	± 0	22.4%	8
SPD	52.2%	19	− 2.1%	−1	54.3%	20
FWG	26.4%	10	− 0.9%	+1	27.3%	9

=== Mayor ===
Since the second world war Borken have four majors:

- Heinrich Albrecht (26. April 1945 till 2. Juno 1961)
- Konrad Vogel (SPD) (3. Juno 1961 till 7. March 1971)
- Heinz Kniest (SPD) (12. July 1971 till 30. September 1987)
- Bernd Heßler (SPD) (1. October 1987 till today)

The mayor of Borken is Bernd Heßler (SPD). By the last direct election he reached 60.0%.

=== Town partnerships ===
Borken has a partnership to Méru, France since 1964. This partnership received a donation from the German French Culture Foundation for exemplary partnership in 1978. In 1999 received the partnership a donation from the European Parliament with the European diplom.

Since 1989 it gives a partnership to Hüttschlag, Austria.

For more good relationship to Eastern European people came in 2001 a partnership to Izabelin, Poland.

In the course of the German reunification said the parliament of Borken in 1991 we should get a partnership with Teuchern, Saxony-Anhalt in the former eastern Germany.

The quarter of Borken Großenenglis decided in 1970 a partnership with Noailles, France.

Another quarter of Borken Kleinenglis decided in 1966 a partnership with Haucourt-Moulaine-St. Charles, France.

This quarters (Großenenglis, Kleinenglis) where in the years of hers decision independent communities.

=== Coat of arms ===
Borken's civic coat of arms might heraldically be described thus: Argent a lion rampant gules, armed Or and langued gules, within, a mullet of six argent.

The arms were granted in their present form in 1951 after a series of different arms that all featured the lion, the oldest known of which dates from the late 14th century. Later, the lion in the town's arms was the red-and-silver-striped Lion of Hesse (which also appears in Hesse's arms and a great number of civic arms throughout Hesse). Other arms showed a red or blue lion. The star is a medieval symbol used by the Counts of Ziegenhain who held sway in the area in the early Middle Ages.

== Landmarks ==
=== Borkener Seenland ===
The "Stockelache Nature Bathing Lake", the Singlis surfing lake and the Borkener See nature reserve use the old coal-mining lands for tourism with a broad choice of activities ranging from bathing, swimming and diving to beach volleyball, windsurfing and Aqua-Golf, to recreation, hiking, and nature watching.

=== Hessian Brown Coal Mining Museum ===
The Hessian Brown Coal Mining Museum, founded in 1992, presents under the theme of "Discover industrial culture – experience landscape change" many exhibits from coal-mining and electrical generation, whose workings are demonstrated for visitors. These exhibits include the underground and above-ground mining of the raw material, brown coal, its use, and the conversion of the former mining lands as the centrepiece.

The visitor may choose from among four museum areas:

- In the 3.5 ha experience-oriented "Coal & Energy" theme park, rattling excavators, humming turbines and smoking power station kettles show how coal was mined from the pits, and how it was used for energy.
- A reconstructed gallery displays the miners' work and everyday lives, and shows through original equipment the change in mining procedures.
- A permanent exhibition presents the 400-year history of Hessian brown coal mining.
- The "Borkener See" nature conservation information centre explains how "second-hand" landscapes are fashioned from former strip mining areas.

The visitors' mine and the "mining history" exhibit are housed in Borken's oldest building, "Am Amtsgericht" – built in 1473 – in the Old Town. The "Coal & Energy" theme park and the adjoining "Borkener See" nature conservation information centre are found Am Freilichtmuseum ("At the Open-Air Museum") before the town's gates.

=== Great power plant Borken ===
The Borken power plant building, which still stands today is protected as a monument. It was built in 1922‒1923 by the famous industrial architects Werner Issel and Walter Klingenberg.

== Constituent communities ==
=== Nassenerfurth ===
Nassenerfurth is a small livable village with good infrastructure. Nassenerfurth had its first documentary mention in 1040. There is a Wasserschloss (stately home with a moat) as well as a church from the 15th century. The population is about 630.

=== Stolzenbach ===
Stolzenbach has 123 inhabitants. The Stolzenbach Pit mined brown coal beginning in 1956. On 1 June 1988, 51 miners were killed in a coal dust explosion there. The now abandoned coal pit is an important site for palaeontological finds, notably of the turtle species Palaeoemys hessiaca and Borkenia oschkinisi, the former named after Hesse, and the latter after Borken.

=== Trockenerfurth ===
Trockenerfurth has 967 inhabitants (as of March 2004).

== Sons of the town ==
- Wilhelm Christoph Friedrich Arnold (1826-1883), cultural historian
- Heinrich von Porbeck, major general, died at the Battle of Talavera (1809)
- Hans Wittich (1911-1984), mathematician
- Ernst Koch (1807-1858), writer and jurist
- Johann von Geyso (1593-1661), general

== Schools ==
- Gesamtschule Gustav-Heinemann-Schule GHS-Borken]
- Grundschule Borken
- Förderschule - Teichgartenschule (Teichgartenweg 1)
- Grundschule Kleinenglis
