= Lendorf, Borken =

Coordinates: 51.063396°N 9.346494°E

Lendorf is a constituent community of Borken (Hesse, Germany) and had its first documentary mention in 1221 as "Lintdorf". Once an independent community, it has now been amalgamated with Borken since 1971. Lendorf has about 400 inhabitants.

474 Hectare (51,020,886 sq ft) are the boundary of Lendorf.
