= Singlis =

Coordinates: 51°03′51″N 9°19′08″E

- Village
- Location within Germany
- Country: Germany
- State: Hesse
- District: Schwalm-Eder-Kreis
- Municipality: Borken
- First documented: 775

Area
  - Total: 5.03 km^{2} (1.94 sq mi)

Population
  - Total: 909
  - Density: 181/km^{2} (468/sq mi)
- Time zone: UTC+1/+2 (CET/CEST)

The formerly independent municipality of Singlis merged with Borken in 1974 at which time its population was 880. It lies within the county of Schwalm-Eder-Kreis in Hesse, Germany.

Its neighbouring municipalities are: Lembach (part of the municipality of Homberg) to the southeast, Borken to the southwest, Gombeth to the northwest and Lendorf to the east.

== History ==
Singlis lies at the point where the Gilsbach stream, coming from Pfaffenhausen, empties into the Schwalm. It is an ancient settlement whose roots reach back to the early Stone Age. It is first documented, like Großenenglis, in 775 in the Breviarium sancti Lulli. In the centuries that followed, the House of Züschen, a local noble family, thrived and amassed considerable wealth. In 1265, the family sold their estates in Singlis together with all their trappings, including the mill and the court in Singlis and Nordwig, to the monastery at Haina. The monastery turned their new estate, with about 55 morgens of land, into one of its most important farms. As a result of the Reformation and the monastery's consequent dissolution, its farm in Singlis, along with its income, was assigned to the University of Marburg. The farm was put into the care of a landgravial vogt and was called the Universitäts-Vogtei Singlis ("Singlis University Vogtei"). In the middle of the 19th century, the farm was sold and, later, elements were sold off to various farmers in Singlis. In 1578, the village belonged to the Amt of Borken and at the time had about 52 households. After a drop in population, like much of Central Europe caused by the Thirty Years' War, it was not until the early 19th century that the population once again reached its former level. Today, Singlis has 909 inhabitants. The church's current location was presumably the centre of settlement in the early Middle Ages. The land there is roughly 2 m higher than that around it, keeping it well above most floodwater. A church was first mentioned in 1265 when the Züschens sold the monastery their landholdings. The church that stands today was built between 1700 and 1710 as a simple hall and has since been comprehensively renovated several times, the latest work being carried out in 1971. Since then, the bell tower has stood to the north next to the church. Since the Reformation, Singlis has been the seat of a parish and has an affiliated church in Lendorf.

Singlis's Schwalmmühle – Mill on the Schwalm – was first mentioned in 1266. At that time it lay immediately on the Schwalm, that is to say, where the river Gilsbach joins it today. Only in 1508 was a millstream dug and the mill moved to its present site. From then until 1977, the mill was owned by the Wagner and Nöll families. In 1807, the writer Ernst Koch was born in Singlis. PreussenElektra, its new owner, shut the mill down, at least as a grist mill, but to this day they still use it to generate electricity, which is fed into the grid. The 503-hectare rural area was also affected by brown coal strip mining from 1960 to 1972. The former strip mine with the name "Singlis" lay just west of the village and is nowadays a pond 70 hectares in area.
