= Noailles, Oise =

Noailles
- Commune
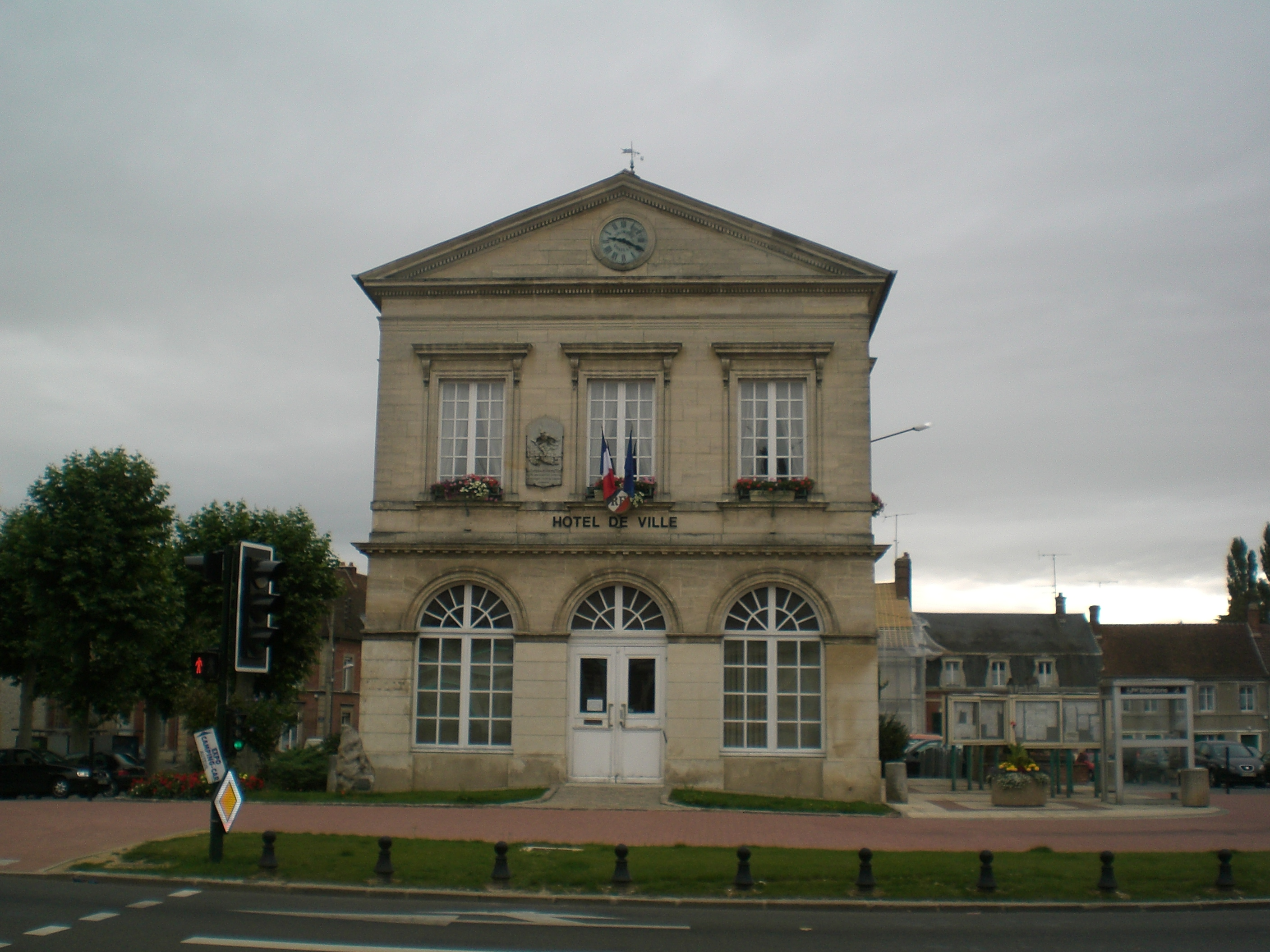
- The town hall in Noailles

- Coat of arms
- Location of Noailles
- Location within France Location within Hauts-de-France
- Coordinates: 49°19′43″N 2°12′02″E
- Country: France
- Region: Hauts-de-France
- Department: Oise
- Arrondissement: Beauvais
- Canton: Chaumont-en-Vexin
- Intercommunality: CC Thelloise

Government
  - Mayor (2020–2026): Benoît Biberon
- Area^{1}: 10.04 km^{2} (3.88 sq mi)
- Elevation: 91 m (299 ft)
- Highest elevation: 225 m (738 ft)
- Lowest elevation: 60 m (200 ft)
- Population (2023): 2,877
  - Density: 286.6/km^{2} (742.2/sq mi)
- Time zone: UTC+01:00 (CET)
  - Summer (DST): UTC+02:00 (CEST)
- INSEE/Postal code: 60462 /60430
- ^{1} French Land Register data, which excludes lakes, ponds, glaciers > 1 km^{2} (0.386 sq mi or 247 acres) and river estuaries.

Noailles (French pronunciation: [nɔaj]) is a commune in the Oise department in northern France.

== Population ==
Historical population
Year	Pop.	±% p.a.
1968	1,333	—
1975	1,538	+2.06%
1982	1,757	+1.92%
1990	2,415	+4.06%
1999	2,672	+1.13%
2007	2,675	+0.01%
2012	2,820	+1.06%
2017	2,826	+0.04%
2023	2,877	+0.30%
Source: INSEE

== International relations ==
Noailles has a partnership with Großenenglis in Germany since 1969.

== See also ==
- Communes of the Oise department
