= Olmes =

River in Germany

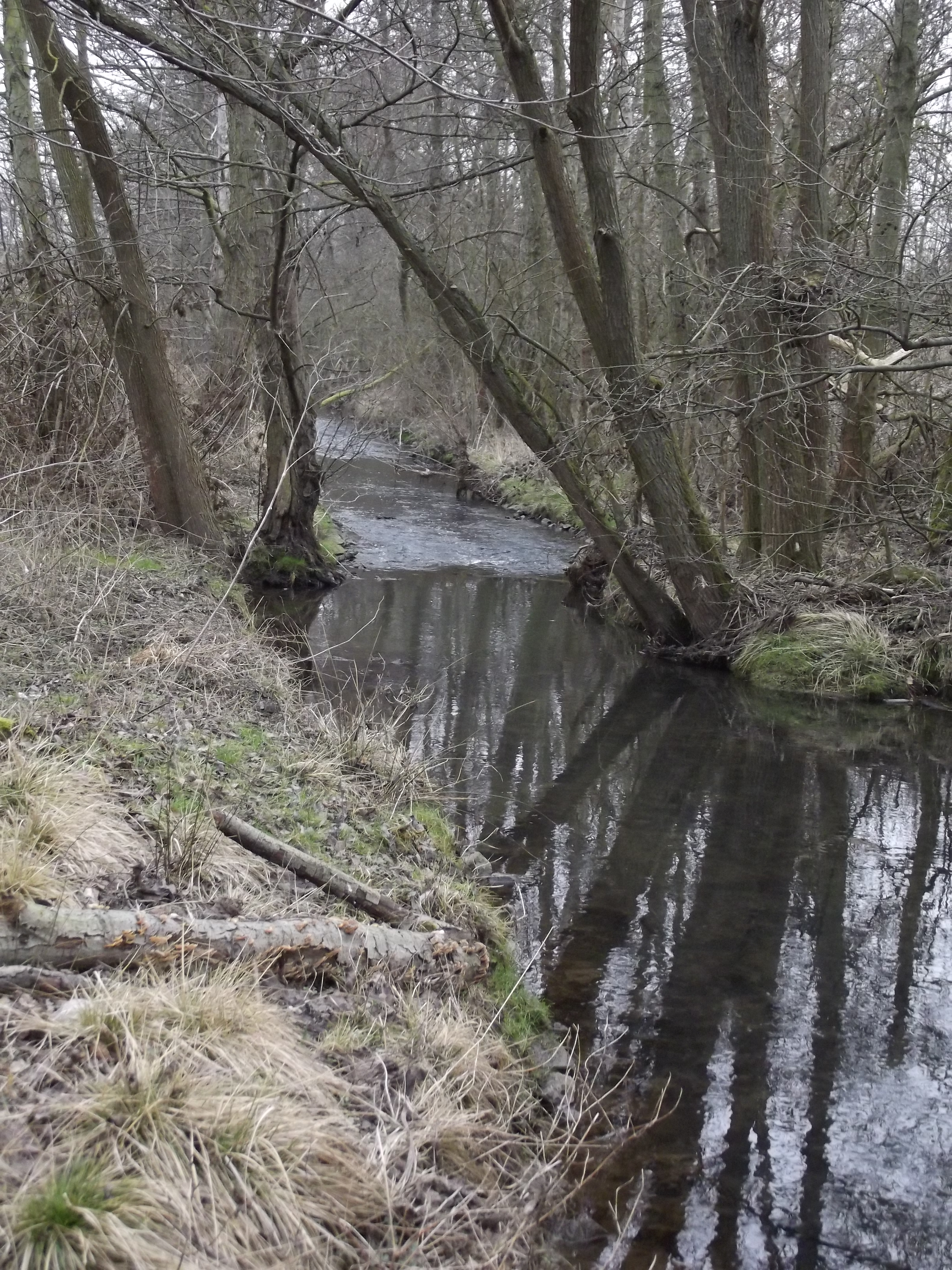

Location
- Country: Germany
- State: Hesse

Physical characteristics
- Mouth
  - location: Schwalm
  - coordinates: 51.0609°N 9.2756°E
- Length: 11.1 km (6.9 mi)

Basin features
- Progression: Schwalm→ Eder→ Fulda→ Weser→ North Sea

Olmes is a river of Hesse, Germany. It flows into the Schwalm near Borken.

== See also ==
- List of rivers of Hesse
