= Karl Eichfeld =

German politician

Karl Eichfeld served as the War Minister of the Baden revolutionary provisional government in 1849.
