= Kleinenglis =

Coordinates: 51°4′16.3092″N 9°15′24.66″E

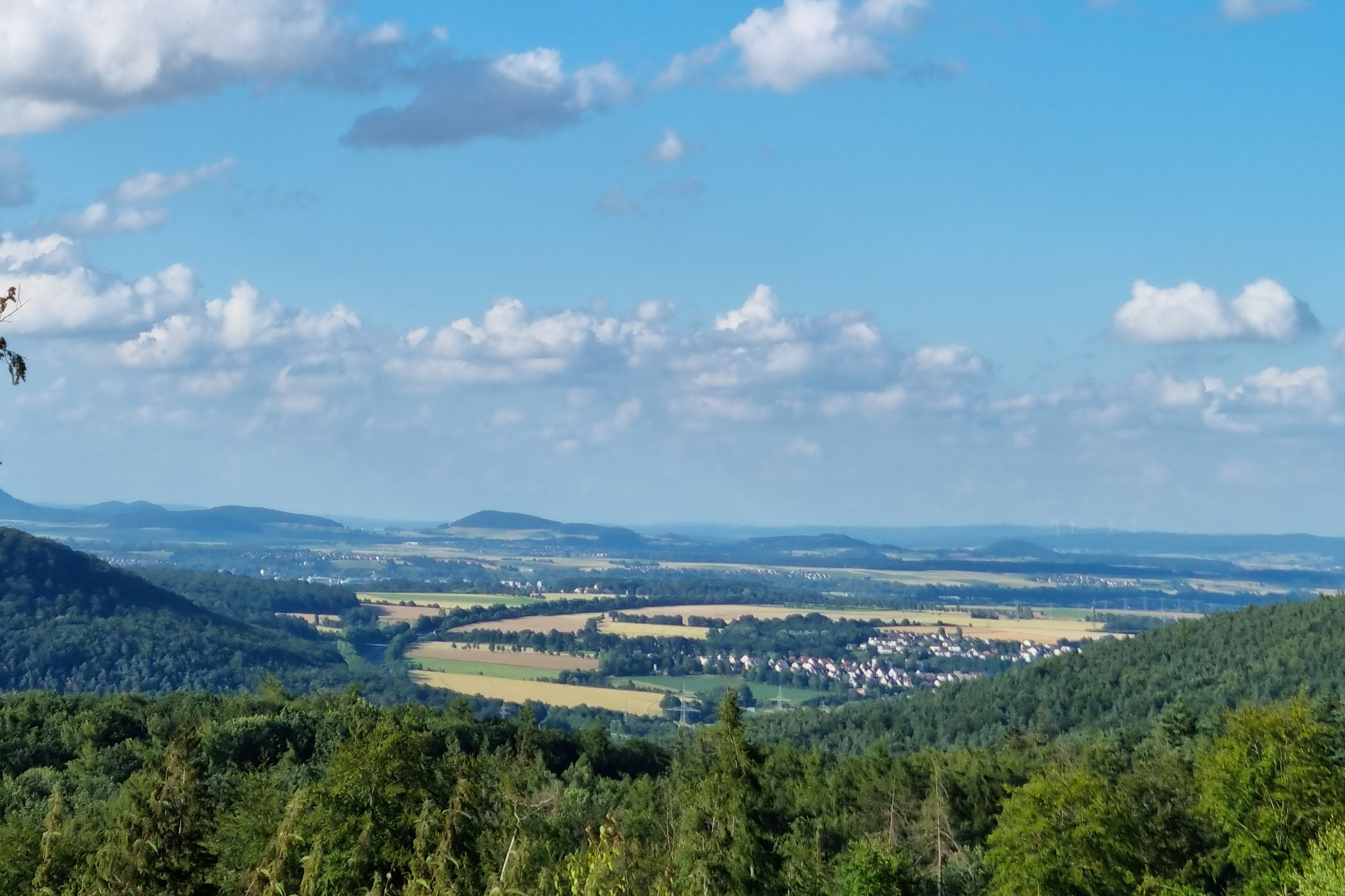

Kleinenglis is a constituent community of Borken (Hesse, Germany). Kleinenglis has about 1300 inhabitants, and over the years it has become Borken's biggest community.

== Sightseeing ==
A memorial of significance to the nation's history is the Kaiserkreuz ("Emperor's Cross"). Here on 5 June 1400, Duke Friedrich of Braunschweig-Wolfenbüttel was murdered. The inscription on the cross itself, written in Gothic minuscule, has never been interpreted beyond doubt, despite many attempts over the ages.

A further cultural monument is the St. Michael Kirche (church) on Hundsburgstraße with its late Gothic wall paintings from the 15th to 16th century.
