= Gombeth =

Coordinates: 51°03′54″N 9°17′21″E

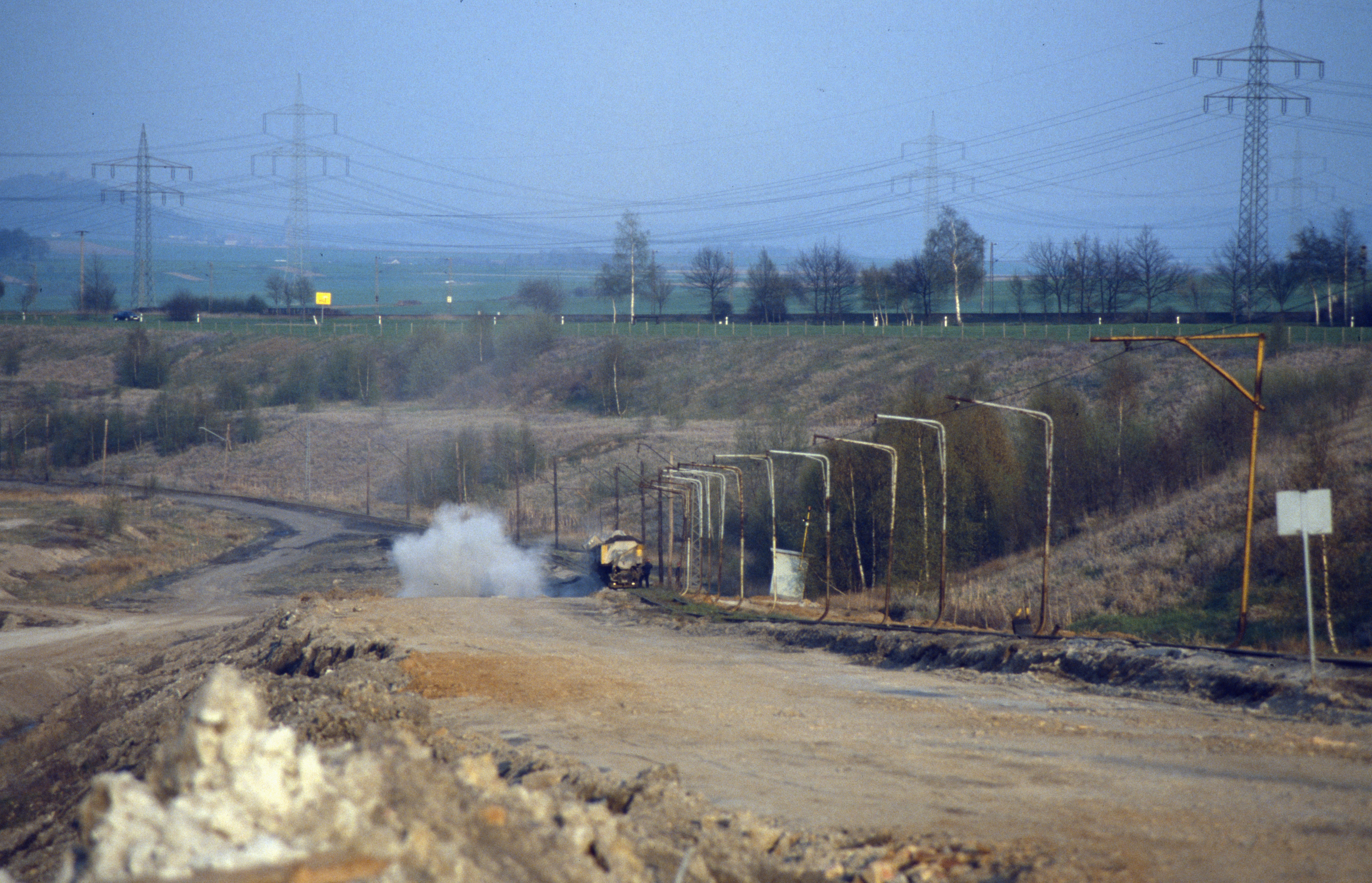

Gombeth is a constituent community of Borken (Hesse, Germany) and had its first documentary mention in 857 as "Gumbetta die Marka". Once an independent community, it was amalgamated with Borken in 1974. Gombeth is surrounded on all sides by former open-pit brown coal mines, being found to the south, towards Singlis (nowadays a windsurfing lake), and towards Borken. The pit east of Gombeth was filled in by PreussenElektra as part of the renaturation programme.

== Historic buildings ==
- Church tower "Warte auf der Landwehr" (built 1431)
- Amtshaus (Sternstraße, built 1686)
- Rittergut Handt (stately house, built 1505 - 1515)
- Rittergut Kalbsburg (about 2 km north of town) with villa (built 1911 - 1913)
