= Arnsbach, Borken =

Arnsbach
- Village of Borken
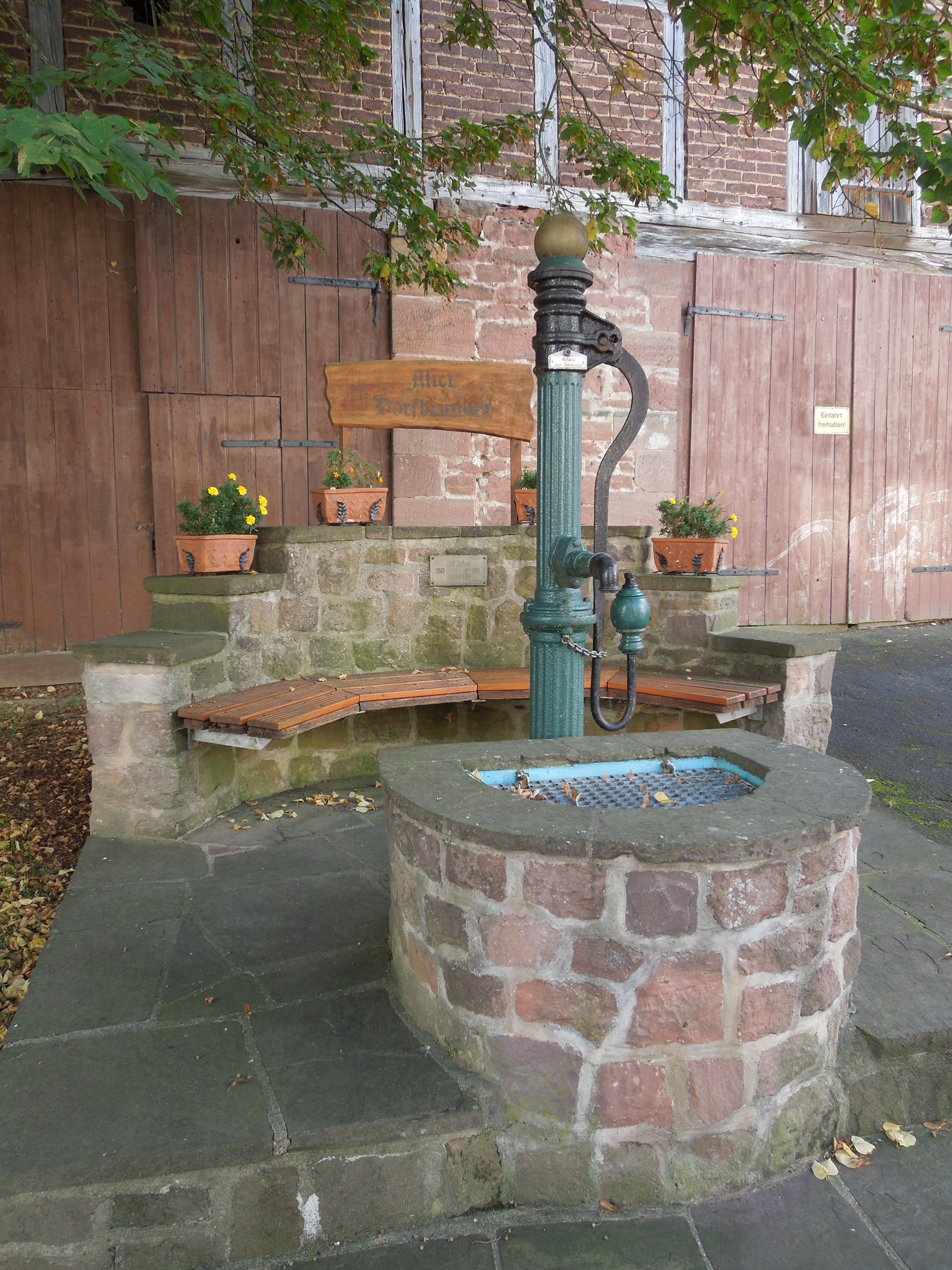
- Interactive map of Arnsbach
- Location within Germany Location within Hesse
- Coordinates: 51°03′16″N 9°14′46″E
- Country: Germany
- State: Hesse
- District: Schwalm-Eder-Kreis
- Town: Borken

Area
  - Total: 6.88 km^{2} (2.66 sq mi)

Population (2020)
  - Total: 482
  - Density: 70.1/km^{2} (181/sq mi)
- Time zone: UTC+01:00 (CET)
  - Summer (DST): UTC+02:00 (CEST)

Arnsbach is a village in the Schwalm-Eder-Kreis, northern Hesse, Germany. It became a district of Borken in 1974. It has 482 inhabitants (February 2020). It lies near the Stockelache bathing lake. On the northeastern foot of the Altenburg (castle) lies the early settlement of Blankenhain. The village is first mentioned in documents in 1245 as Arnesbach. The district of Arnsbach is located in the west of the Borken basin and has a size of approximately 688 hectares. The bathing lake of Stockelache was created from a lignite mine in the area. Southeast, on the summit of the mountain Altenburg and partly on Arnsbacher district, are the remains of an Iron Age circular wall called Altenburg, or Altenburg at Römersberg.
