= Bernhard von Poten =

Prussian colonel (1828–1909)

- Birth name: Karl Georg Heinrich Bernhard von Poten
- Born: 8 August 1828
- Died: 22 November 1909 (aged 81)
- Allegiance: Prussia
- Branch: Prussian Army
- Rank: Colonel
- Commands: Queen's Hussar Regiment. Hussar Regiment no. 4

Karl Georg Heinrich Bernhard von Poten (8 August 1828 – 22 November 1909), known as Bernhard von Poten, was a royal Prussian colonel best known for his military writing.

== Family and life ==
Poten was born in Celle on 8 August 1828, into a bourgeois family of officers from the Kingdom of Hanover. His parents were the Hannoversche Major Georg Poten (1799–1882) and Juliane Dorothea Kannengießer (1804–1841). His uncle Friedrich Poten (1779–1845), Hanoverian lieutenant colonel, was made hereditary baron in 1827 by Grand Duke Ludwig I of Baden. His nephew continued the baronial lineage.

On 17 September 1861, Poten married Anna Sophie Elisabeth Behncke (1837–1905) in Celle. They had a son Heinrich Georg Wilhelm Alexander von Poten (1863–1920) also a Prussian major general and commander of the Cuirassiers in Brandenburg. Poten died in Berlin on 22 November 1909.

== Career ==
Berhard von Poten served from 1847 to 1866 in the Hanover Military services. In 1847, he was a second lieutenant, and was promoted to first lieutenant in 1854 and in 1863 to captain. As such, he belonged to the Hanoverian Queens Hussar Regiment. In 1867, Poten was squadron leader in Hussar Regiment no. 4. His promotion to major came in 1870. Between 1871 and 1874, he was on the staff of the regiment and 1874–1884 adjutant at the General Inspectorate of the military education and training system. He was promoted to the rank of lieutenant colonel in 1875, and then to colonel in 1878.

== Writings ==
- Militairischer Dienst-Unterricht für die Kavallerie des deutschen Reichsheeres, Berlin 1875.
- Unser Volk in Waffen : Das dt. Heer in Wort u. Bild, Berlin/Stuttgart 1887.
- Georg Freiherr von Baring, königlich hannoverscher Generallieutenant 1773–1848 : Ein Lebensbild auf Grund v. Aufzeichngn d. Verstorbenen u. v. Mittheilgn d. Familie entworfen, Berlin 1898.
- Geschichte des Militär-Erziehungs- und Bildungswesens in den Landen deutscher Zunge, Berlin 1900.
- Des Königs Deutsche Legion : 1803–1816, 1905.
- Handbuch für den Einjährig-Freiwilligen sowie für den Reserve- und Landwehr-Offizier der Kavallerie, Berlin 1911 (gemeinsam mit Albrecht Axel von Maltzahn).
- Handwörterbuch der gesamten Militärwissenschaften, mehrere Bände, Leipzig 1878.
- Kommandobuch zum ExerzirReglement für die Kavallerie vom 10. April 1886,
- Geschichte des Militär-erziehungs- und Bildungswesens in Sachsen,
- Poten hat zudem zahlreiche Einzelartikel in der Allgemeinen Deutschen Biographie (ADB) verfasst, meist zu Offizieren.
