= Stockelache =

Lake in Germany

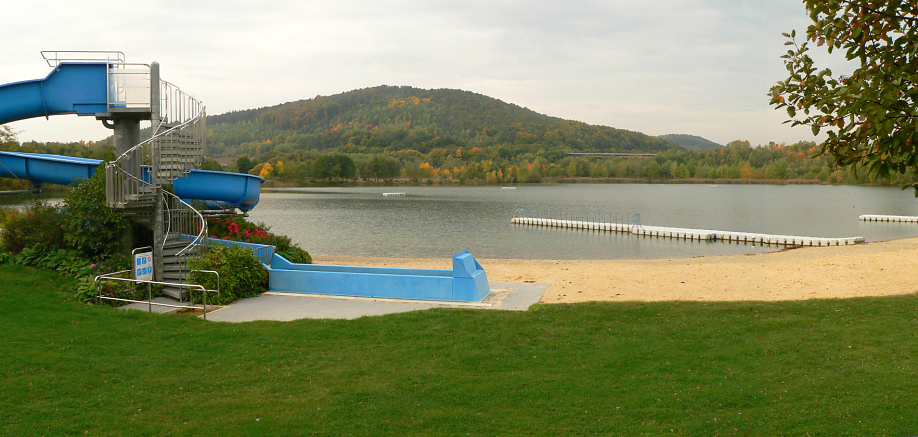

- Location within Hesse
- Location: West Hesse Depression, Hesse
- Coordinates: 51.06454°N 9.242764°E
- Basin countries: Germany
- Max. length: 0.32 km (0.20 mi)
- Max. width: 0.255 km (0.158 mi)
- Surface area: 10 ha (25 acres)
- Surface elevation: 185 m (607 ft)

Stockelache is a lake in West Hesse Depression, Hesse, Germany. At an elevation of 185 m, its surface area is 10 ha. It is a bathing lake.
