= Kuhbach (Itter) =

River in Germany

Location
- Country: Germany
- State: Hesse

Physical characteristics
- Mouth
  - location: Itter
  - coordinates: 51.2308°N 8.8930°E
- Length: 11.9 km (7.4 mi)

Basin features
- Progression: Itter→ Eder→ Fulda→ Weser→ North Sea

Kuhbach is a river of Hesse, Germany. It passes through Korbach and flows into the Itter near Vöhl-Obernburg.

== See also ==
- List of rivers of Hesse
