= Klingebach =

River in Germany

Location
- Country: Germany
- States: Hesse

Physical characteristics
- Mouth
  - location: Reiherbach
  - coordinates: 51°12′55″N 9°01′18″E

Basin features
- Progression: Reiherbach→ Eder→ Fulda→ Weser→ North Sea

Klingebach is a river of Hesse, Germany. It flows into the Reiherbach near Waldeck.

== See also ==
- List of rivers of Hesse
