= Spolebach =

River in Germany

Location
- Country: Germany
- State: Hesse

Physical characteristics
- Mouth
  - location: Elbe
  - coordinates: 51.2372°N 9.1858°E
- Length: 12.2 km (7.6 mi)

Basin features
- Progression: Elbe→ Eder→ Fulda→ Weser→ North Sea

Spolebach is a river of Hesse, Germany. It flows into the Elbe (a tributary of the Eder) near Naumburg.

== See also ==
- List of rivers of Hesse
