= Waldeck Pumped Storage Station =

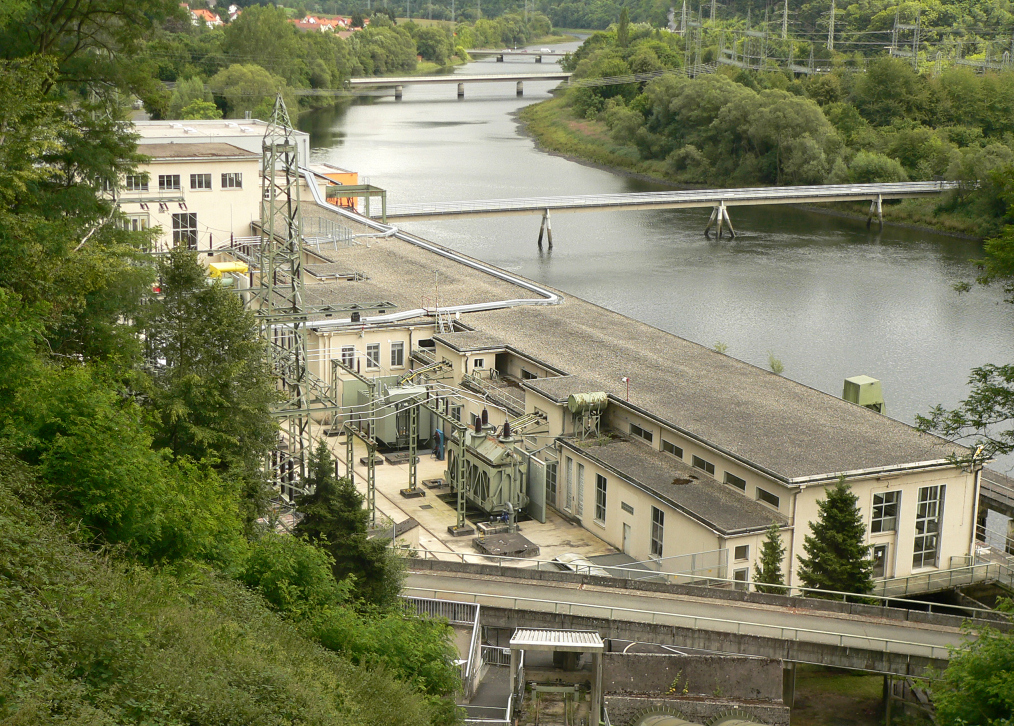
- Power house of Waldeck I
- Official name: Pumpspeicherkraftwerk Waldeck
- Country: Germany
- Location: Waldeck, Hesse
- Coordinates: 51°10′05″N 009°02′44″E
- Status: Operational
- Commission date: 1931, 1974
- Owner: E.ON

Power generation
- Nameplate capacity: 623 MW

External links
- Commons: Related media on Commons

Waldeck Pumped Storage Station (in German: Pumpspeicherkraftwerk Waldeck) is one of the largest pumped storage power stations in Germany. It is located in the Waldeck-Frankenberg district in the municipality Edertal near the town Waldeck in the northern part of the state Hesse and is owned by German electric utility E.ON.

The power station consists of two parts with a common lower reservoir (Affoldener See).

Diagramm of reservoirs and power plants at Eder river in Waldeck-Frankenberg: Reservoirs: Edersee, Waldeck I Upper Reservoir, Waldeck II Upper Reservoir, Affoldener See / Power stations: Hemfurth Power Station, Waldeck I Power Station, Waldeck II Power Station, Affoldern Power Station

== Waldeck I ==
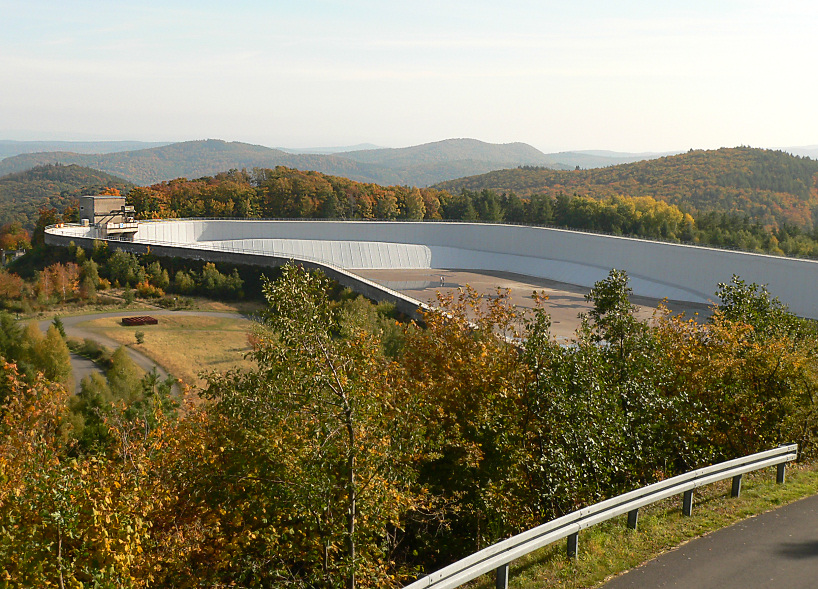
Empty Waldeck I Upper Reservoir

Waldeck I was commissioned in 1931 and has currently an installed capacity of 143 MW. Water is stored in the Waldeck I Upper Reservoir which has a volume of 0.7 mn m³.

== Waldeck II ==
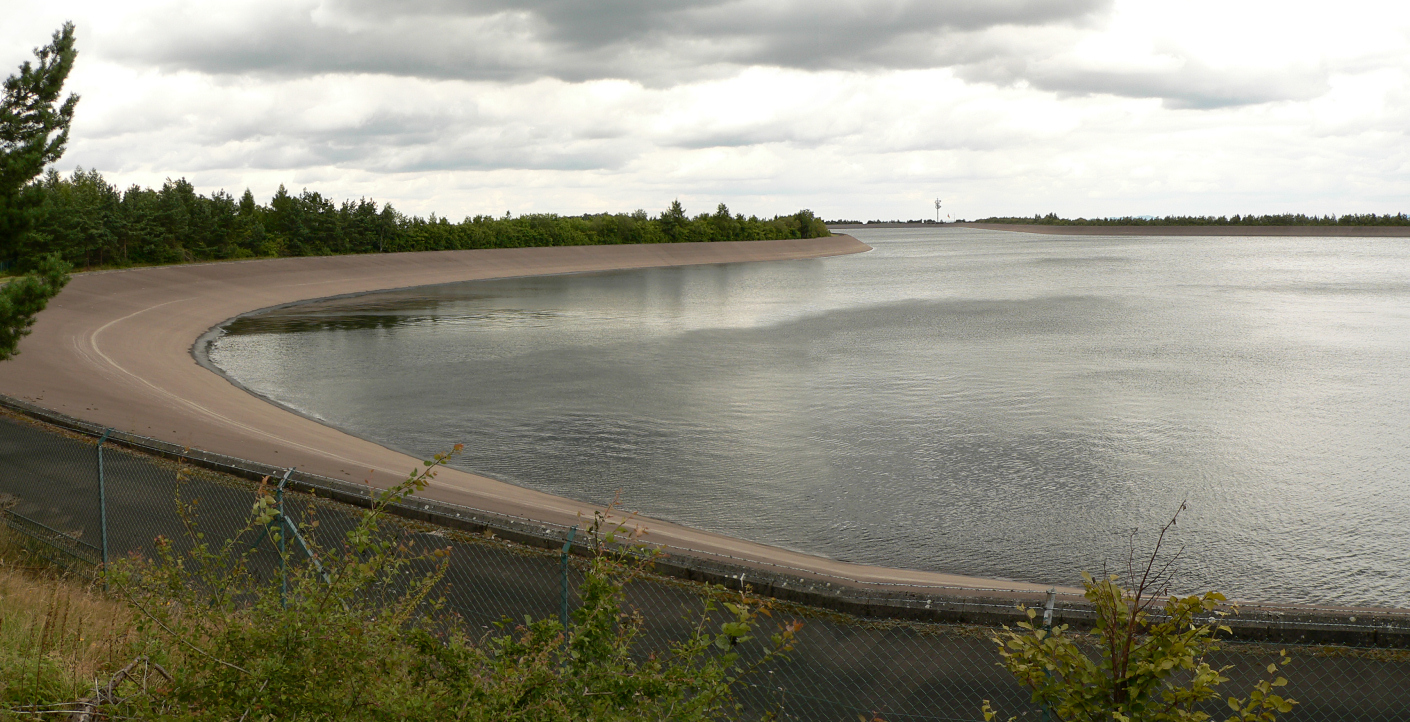
Waldeck II Upper Reservoir

Waldeck II was commissioned in 1974 and has currently an installed capacity of 480 MW. Water is stored in the Waldeck II Upper Reservoir which has a volume of 4.4 mn m³. Waldeck II is built as an underground power station, its machinery is located in a large cavern.

It was planned to extend Waldeck II with an additional turbine of 300 MW. This project is postponed at some indefinite future date because (according to E.ON) new pumped storage stations are not profitable in Germany.

== Electrical substation ==
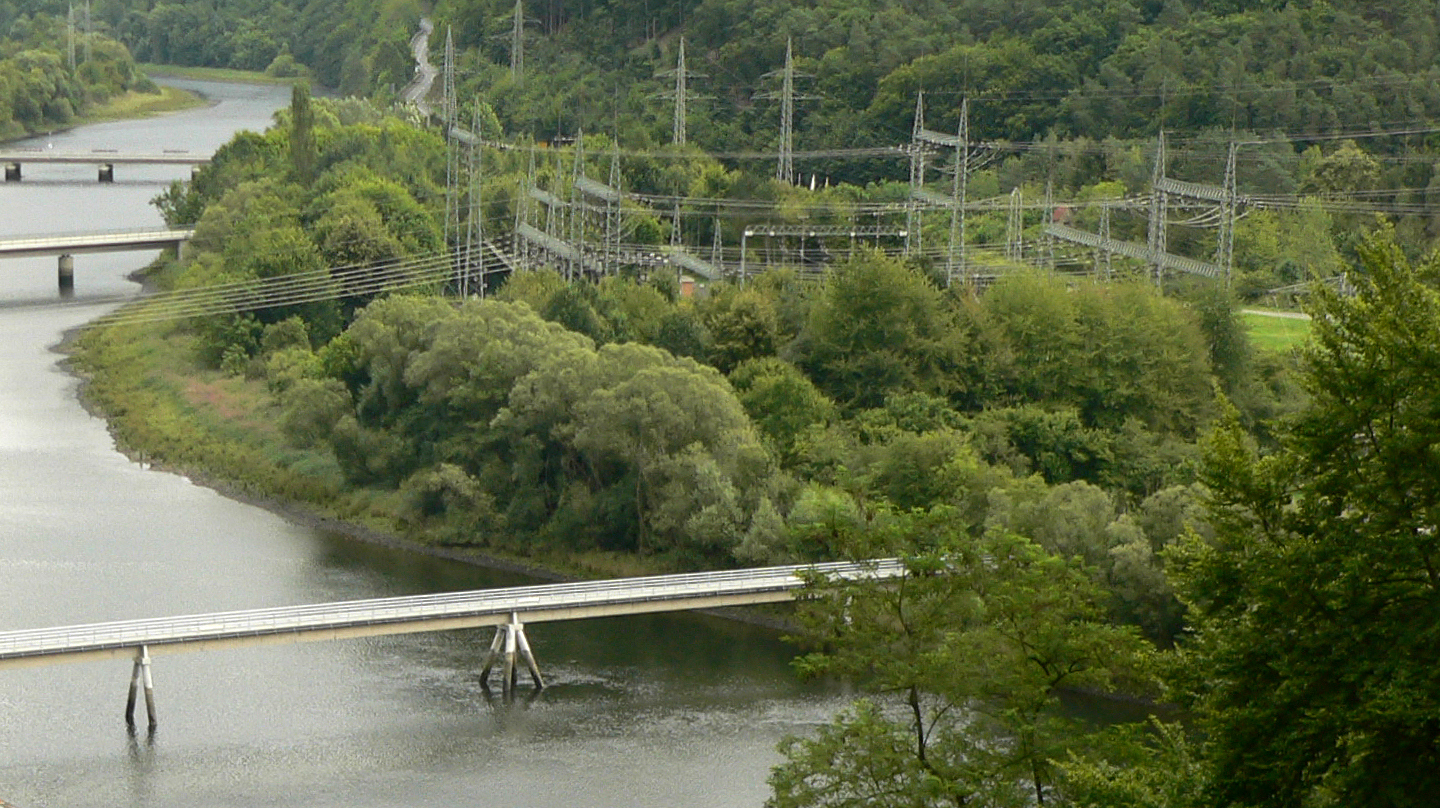
Electrical substation of Waldeck Pumped Storage Station

Waldeck I and II have a common electrical substation. Waldeck I is connected to the 110 kV electrical grid of Avacon. Waldeck II is connected to the 380 kV electrical grid of TenneT TSO.

== Peterskopfbahn ==
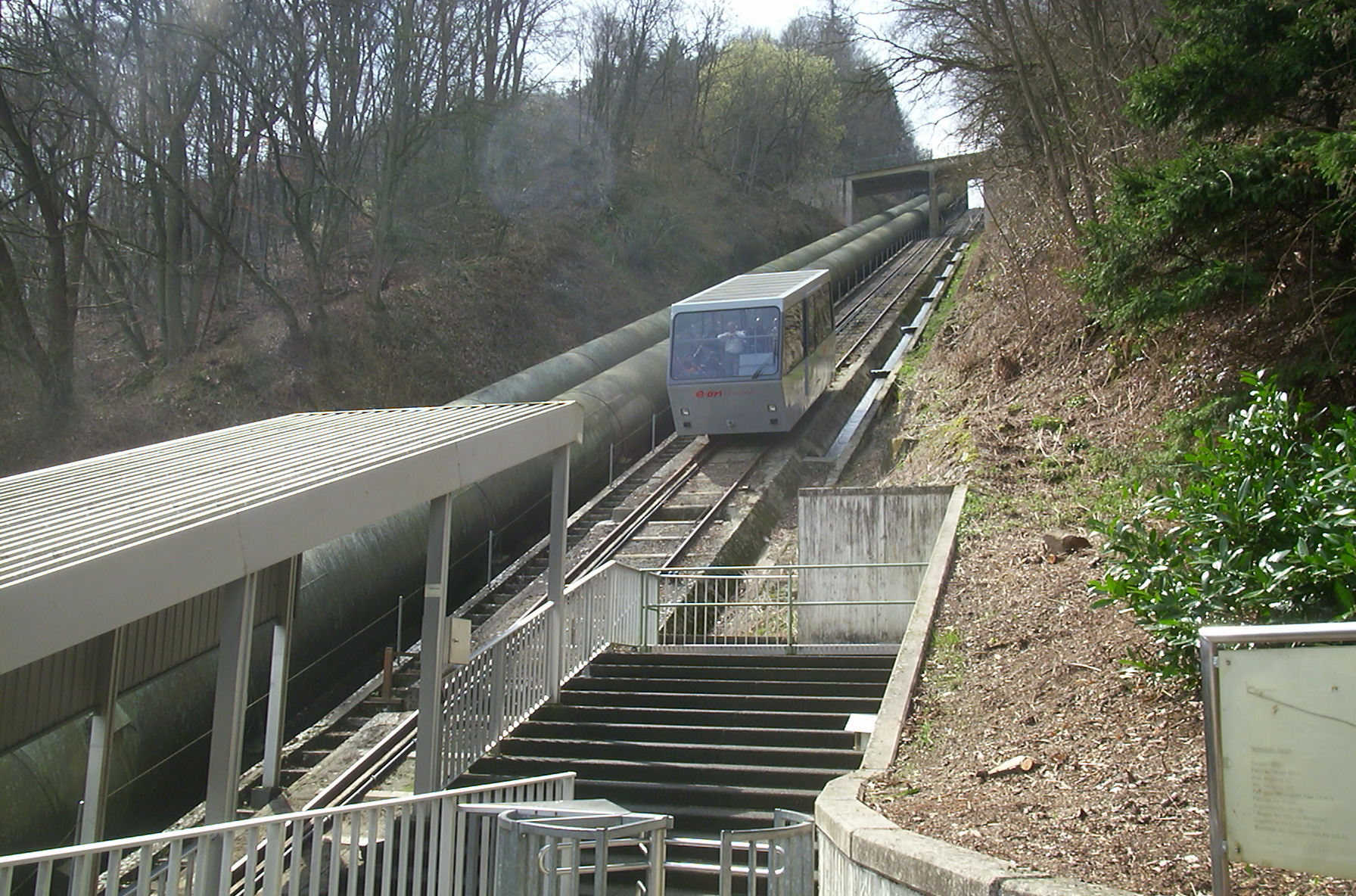
Peterskopfbahn

A funicular called Peterskopfbahn runs in parallel to the penstocks between the upper reservoir and power house of Waldeck I. The funicular is publicly accessible between Easter and October.
