= Netze =

Netze may refer to:

- Netze, the German name for the Noteć river in central Poland
- Netze (Eder), a river of Hesse, Germany, tributary of the Eder
- Netze District, a territory in the Kingdom of Prussia
- DB Netze, a German railway infrastructure manager (Deutsche Bahn)
- Netze, a constituent community of the town Waldeck, Hesse, Germany

== See also ==
- Netz
