= Aselbach =

River in Germany

- Location of mouth in Hesse

Location
- Country: Germany
- State: Hesse

Physical characteristics
- Mouth
  - location: Edersee
  - coordinates: 51.1854°N 8.9493°E

Basin features
- Progression: Eder→ Fulda→ Weser→ North Sea

The Aselbach (also called the Asel) is a small river of Hesse, Germany. It flows into the Edersee on the left bank near Vöhl. It is located between Asel and Asel-Süd/Vöhl. The Aselbach is noted as both a waterway and water area. There are 25 other rivers around the same area. The 6.55 kilometers long Aselbach has a 18.103 km² catchment area.

== See also ==
- List of rivers of Hesse
