= Werbe =

Werbe may refer to:

- Werbe (Eder), a river of Hesse, Germany, tributary of the Edersee
- Peter Werbe, American radio talk show host and anarchist
- Nieder-Werbe and Ober-Werbe, two districts of the town Waldeck, Hesse, Germany
