= Werbe (Eder) =

River in Germany

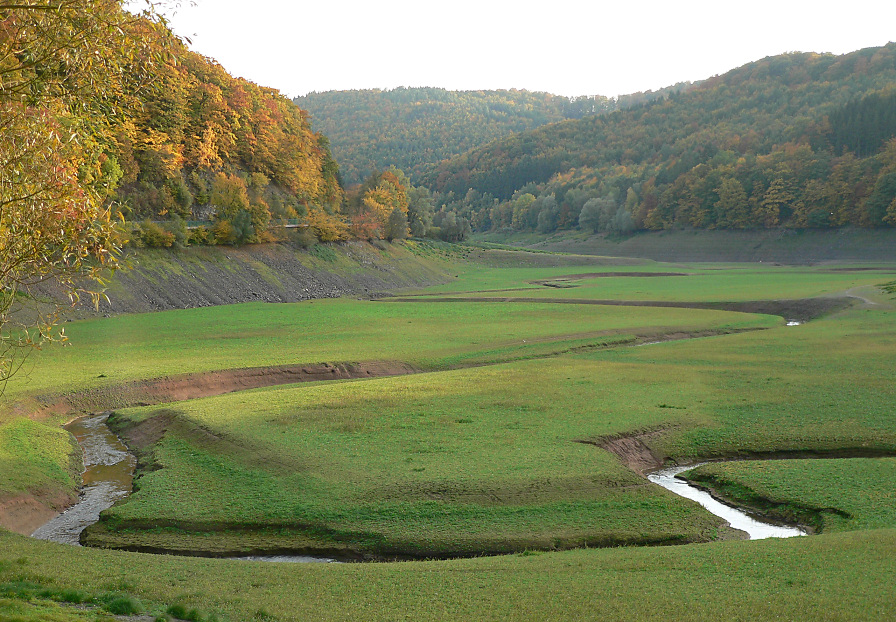

Location
- Country: Germany
- State: Hesse

Physical characteristics
- Mouth
  - location: Edersee
  - coordinates: 51.210°N 9.003°E
- Length: 13.2 km (8.2 mi)

Basin features
- Progression: Eder→ Fulda→ Weser→ North Sea

Werbe is a river of Hesse, Germany. It flows into the Edersee in Waldeck-Nieder-Werbe.

== See also ==
- List of rivers of Hesse
