= Reiherbach (Edersee) =

River in Germany

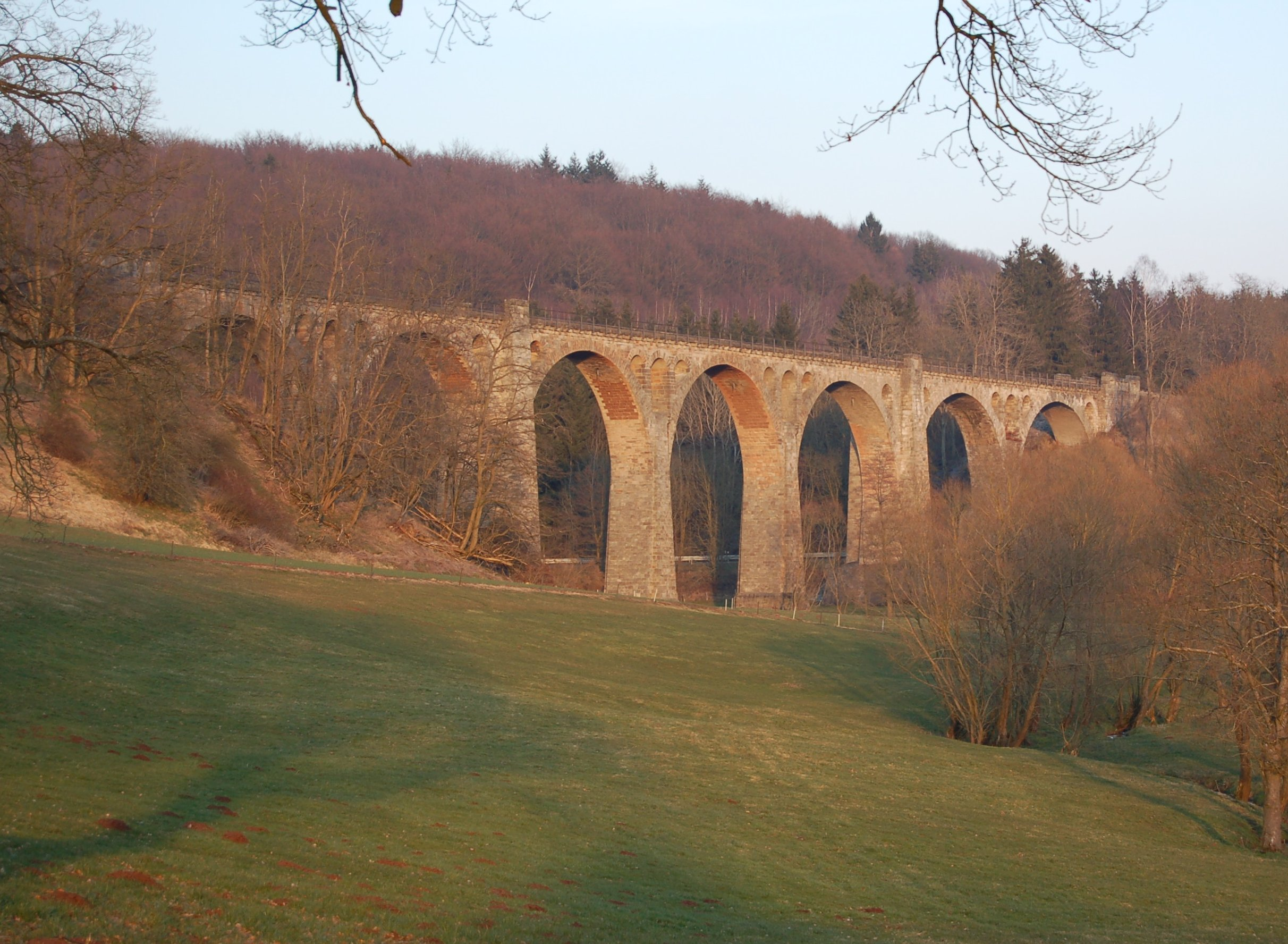

Location
- Country: Germany
- States: Hesse

Physical characteristics
- Mouth
  - location: Edersee
  - coordinates: 51.2119°N 9.0104°E

Basin features
- Progression: Eder→ Fulda→ Weser→ North Sea

Reiherbach is a river of Hesse, Germany. It is a tributary of the Edersee near Waldeck.

== See also ==
- List of rivers of Hesse
