= Netz =

Netz is a surname. Notable people with the name include:

- Luca Netz (born 2003), German professional footballer
- Rani Netz (born 2003), American streamer
- Reviel Netz (born 1968), Israeli scholar of the history of pre-modern mathematics
- Wolf-Rüdiger Netz (born 1950), former football player from East Germany

== See also ==
- Natz (disambiguation)
- Netzer (disambiguation)
- Notz
