= Wesebach =

River in Germany

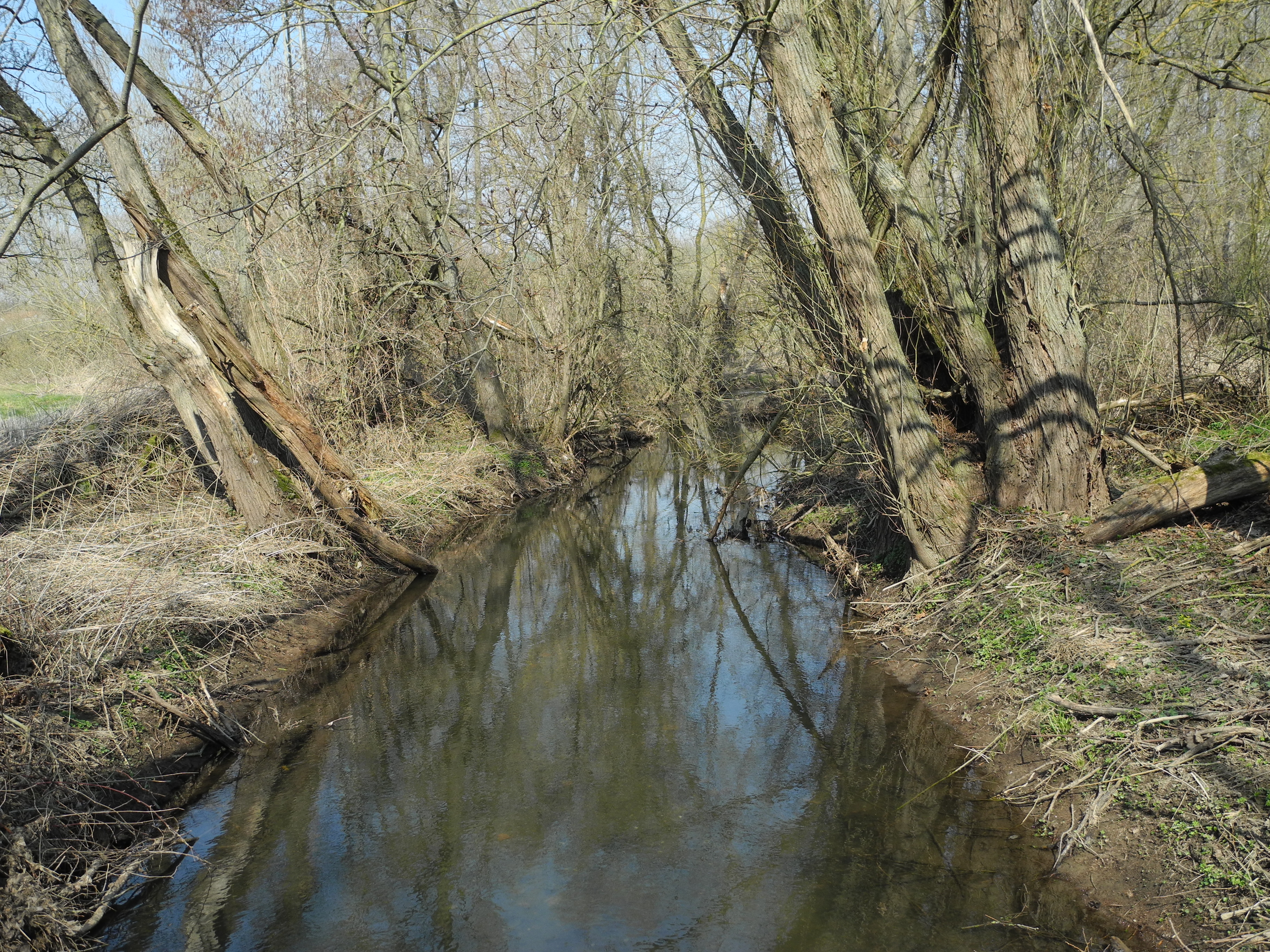

Location
- Country: Germany
- State: Hesse

Physical characteristics
- Mouth
  - location: Eder
  - coordinates: 51.1649°N 9.1296°E
- Length: 24.9 km (15.5 mi)

Basin features
- Progression: Eder→ Fulda→ Weser→ North Sea

Wesebach is a river of Hesse, Germany. It flows into the Eder in Edertal.

== See also ==
- List of rivers of Hesse
