= Netze (Eder) =

River in Germany

- Location within Germany

Location
- Country: Germany
- State: Hesse

Physical characteristics
- Source
  - location: Waldeck
  - elevation: 120 m (390 ft)
- Mouth
  - location: Eder
  - coordinates: 51.1708°N 9.1086°E
  - elevation: 195 m (640 ft)
- Length: 10.8 km (6.7 mi)
- Basin size: 29.0 km^{2} (11.2 sq mi)

Basin features
- Progression: Eder→ Fulda→ Weser→ North Sea

Netze is a river of Hesse, Germany. It flows into the Eder in Mehlen.

== See also ==
- List of rivers of Hesse
