= Elsoff (river) =

River in Germany

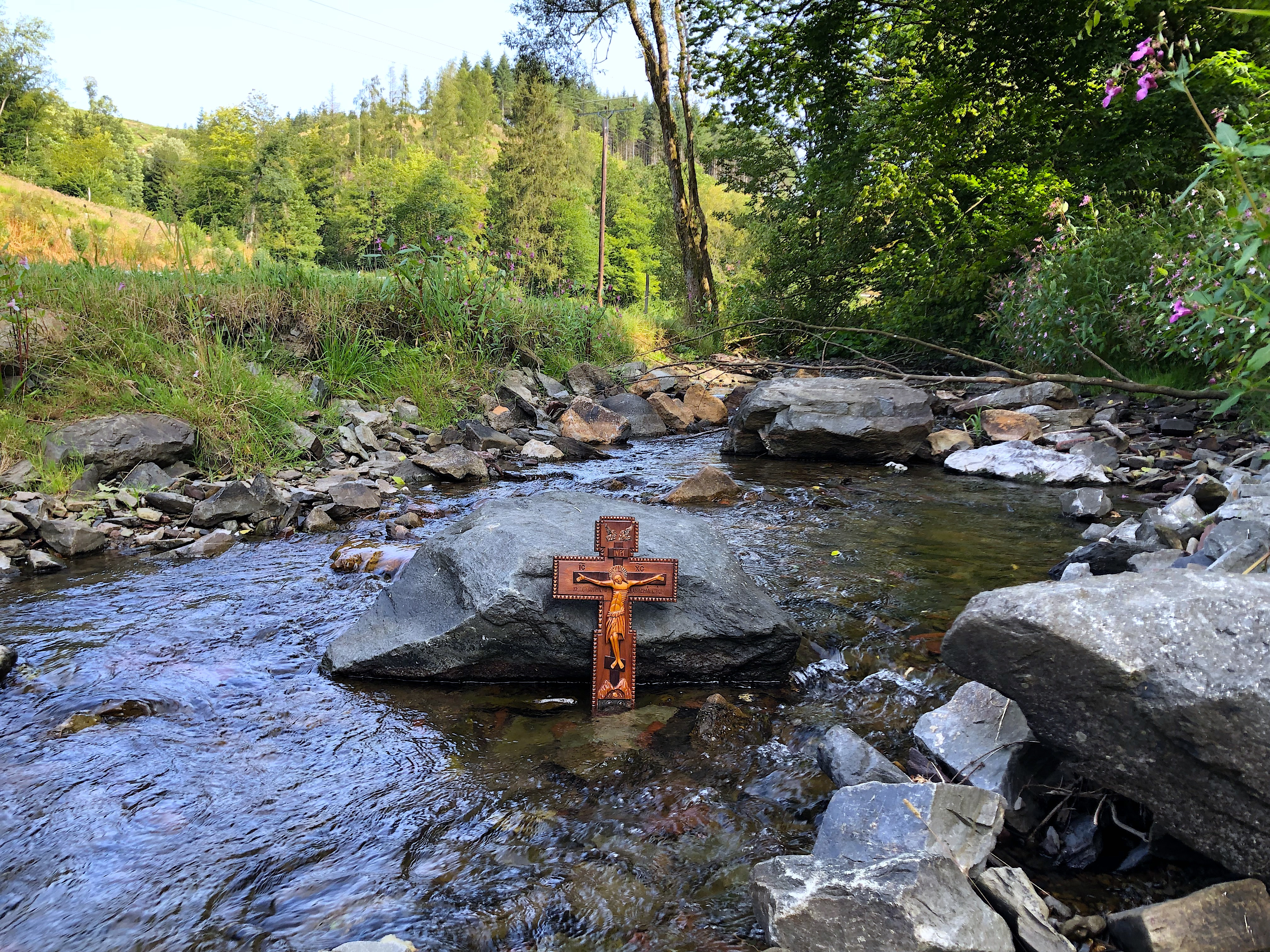

Location
- Country: Germany
- State: Hesse

Physical characteristics
- Mouth
  - location: Eder near Hatzfeld
  - coordinates: 50°59′32″N 8°31′45″E
- Length: 19.2 km (11.9 mi)

Basin features
- Progression: Eder→ Fulda→ Weser→ North Sea

Elsoff is a river of North Rhine-Westphalia and Hesse, Germany. It is a left tributary of the Eder, which it joins near Hatzfeld.

== See also ==
- List of rivers of North Rhine-Westphalia
- List of rivers of Hesse
