= Benfe =

River in Germany

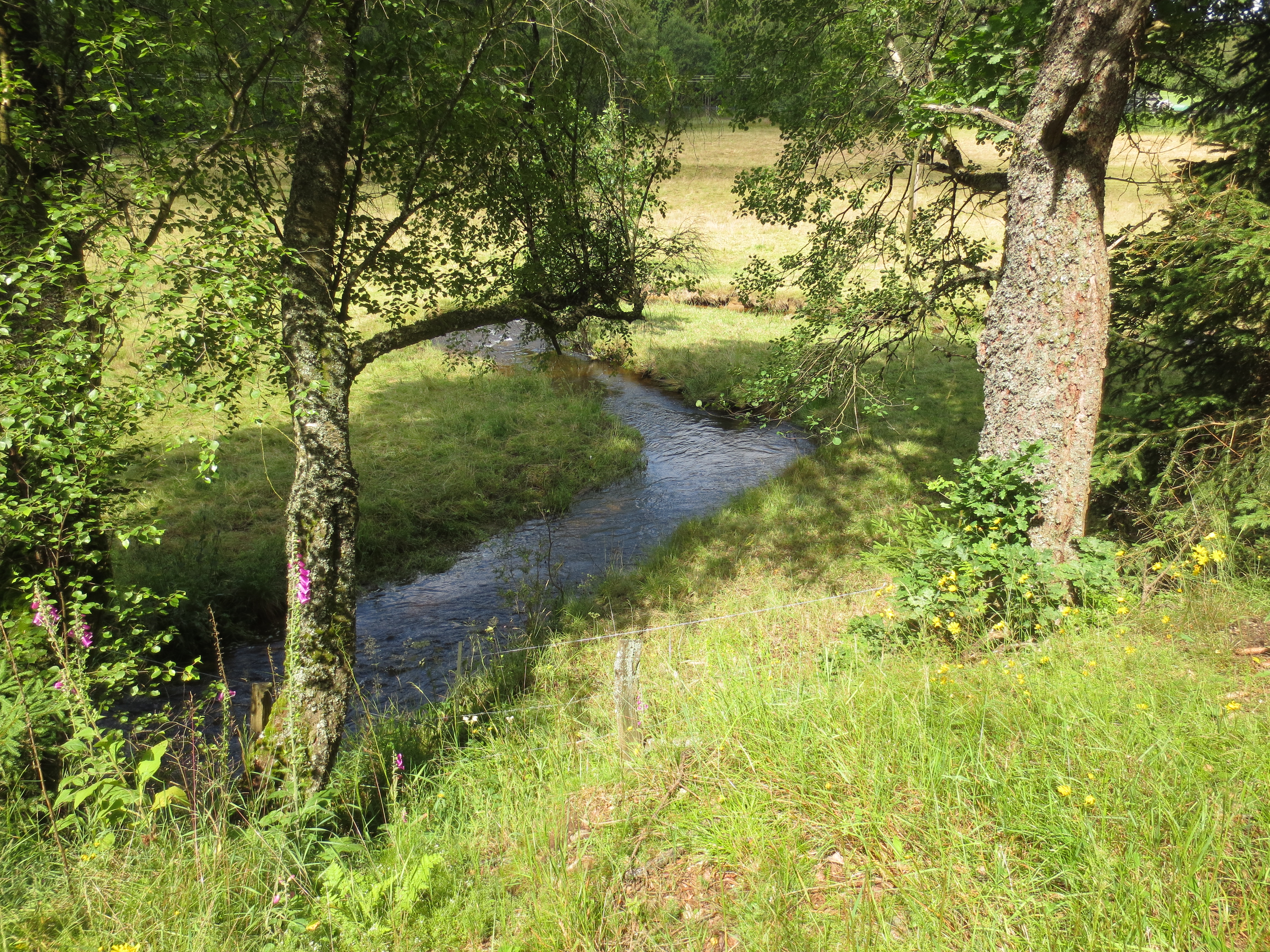

Location
- Country: Germany
- State: North Rhine-Westphalia

Physical characteristics
- Mouth
  - location: Eder
  - coordinates: 50.9898°N 8.2562°E
- Length: 11.2 km (7.0 mi)

Basin features
- Progression: Eder→ Fulda→ Weser→ North Sea

Benfe is a river in North Rhine-Westphalia, Germany. It flows into the Eder in Erndtebrück.

== See also ==
- List of rivers of North Rhine-Westphalia
