= Itter (Eder) =

River in Germany

- Location within Germany

Location
- Country: Germany
- State: Hesse

Physical characteristics
- Mouth
  - location: Edersee
  - coordinates: 51.1836°N 8.8928°E
- Length: 11.6 km (7.2 mi)

Basin features
- Progression: Eder→ Fulda→ Weser→ North Sea

The Itter (German pronunciation: [ˈɪtɐ]) is a river of Hesse, Germany and left tributary of the Edersee. It flows through the area of the former medieval Ittergau, which is named after it, and into the Edersee in Vöhl-Herzhausen.

The lower Itter valley forms the western border of the northern part of the Kellerwald-Edersee National Park.

== See also ==
- List of rivers of Hesse
