= Linspherbach =

River in Germany

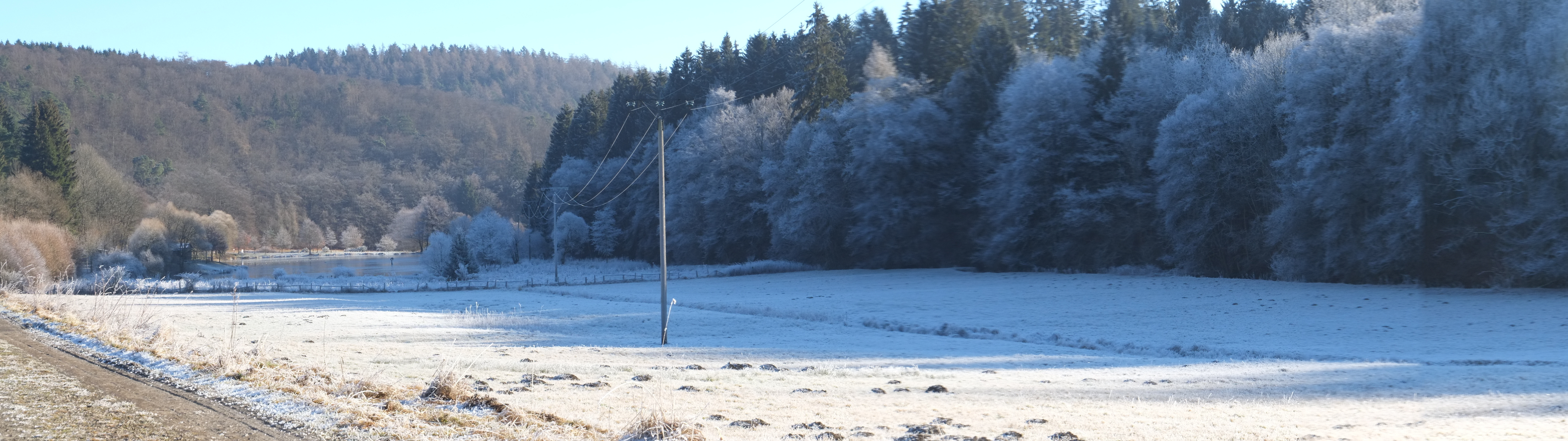
- Linspherbach valley near the watermill Oberlinspher Mühle

Location
- Country: Germany
- State: Hesse

Physical characteristics
- Source
  - coordinates: 51.1043°N 8.5579°E
- Mouth
  - location: Eder
  - coordinates: 51.0189°N 8.6842°E
- Length: 18.2 km (11.3 mi)

Basin features
- Progression: Eder→ Fulda→ Weser→ North Sea
- Tributaries
  - left: Bach von Bromskirchen

Linspherbach is a river of Hesse, Germany. It flows into the Eder near Allendorf.

== See also ==
- List of rivers of Hesse
