= Trüfte =

River in Germany

Location
- Country: Germany
- State: North Rhine-Westphalia

Physical characteristics
- Mouth
  - location: Eder
  - coordinates: 51.0368°N 8.3369°E

Basin features
- Progression: Eder→ Fulda→ Weser→ North Sea

Trüfte is a river of North Rhine-Westphalia, Germany. It is 8.9 km (5.5 mi) long and flows as a left tributary into the Eder near Bad Berleburg.

== See also ==
- List of rivers of North Rhine-Westphalia
