= Nemphe =

River in Germany

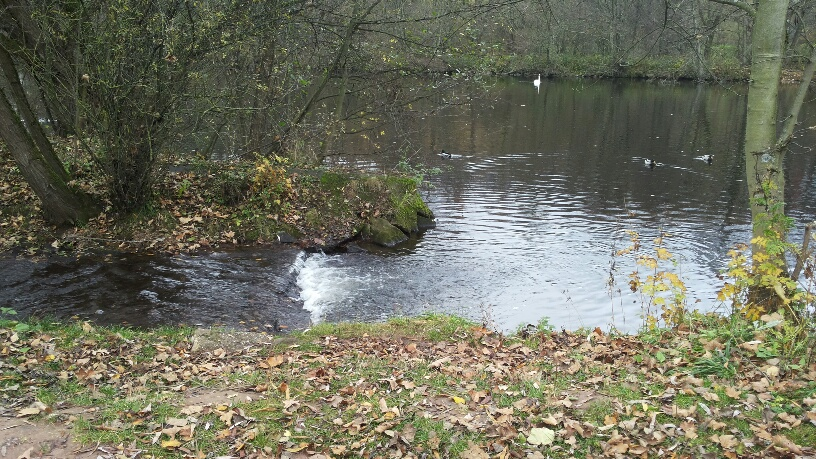

- Location within Germany

Location
- Country: Germany
- State: Hesse

Physical characteristics
- Mouth
  - location: Eder
  - coordinates: 51.0596°N 8.7945°E
- Length: 14.2 km (8.8 mi)

Basin features
- Progression: Eder→ Fulda→ Weser→ North Sea

Nemphe is a river of Hesse, Germany. It flows into the Eder in Frankenberg.

== See also ==
- List of rivers of Hesse
