= Hofbrauhaus Arolsen =

Brewery in Bad Arolsen, Hesse, Germany

Coordinates: 51.3815565°N 9.0193307°E

- Interactive map of Hofbrauhaus Arolsen
- Type: Private enterprise
- Location: Kaulbachstraße 33, Bad Arolsen, Hesse, Germany
- Opened: 1131
- Website: www.hofbrauhaus.biz

Hofbrauhaus Arolsen or Royal Brewery Arolsen is the oldest brewery in the Hesse federal state, located in Bad Arolsen town, Germany. Recent company name is "Hofbrauhaus Heinrich Brüne GmbH & Co. KG" and from 1910 is run by 4th generation of the Brüne family.

Beer was originally produced for the "Aroldessen" (old name for Arolsen) monastery and then for the court of the Count of Waldeck before city of Arolsen was founded.

Brewing operations were discontinued in the fall of 2013. The Hofbrauhaus was deleted from the commercial register on January 30, 2024.

== See also ==
- List of oldest companies
