= Goldbach (Eder) =

River in Germany

Location
- Country: Germany
- States: Hesse

Physical characteristics
- Mouth
  - location: Eder
  - coordinates: 51°02′59″N 8°46′16″E

Basin features
- Progression: Eder→ Fulda→ Weser→ North Sea

Goldbach (German pronunciation: [ˈɡɔltbax]) is a river of Hesse, Germany. It is a tributary of the Eder in Röddenau, district of Frankenberg.

As the name suggests, gold was found in the river.

== See also ==
- List of rivers of Hesse
