= Wilde (Eder) =

River in Germany

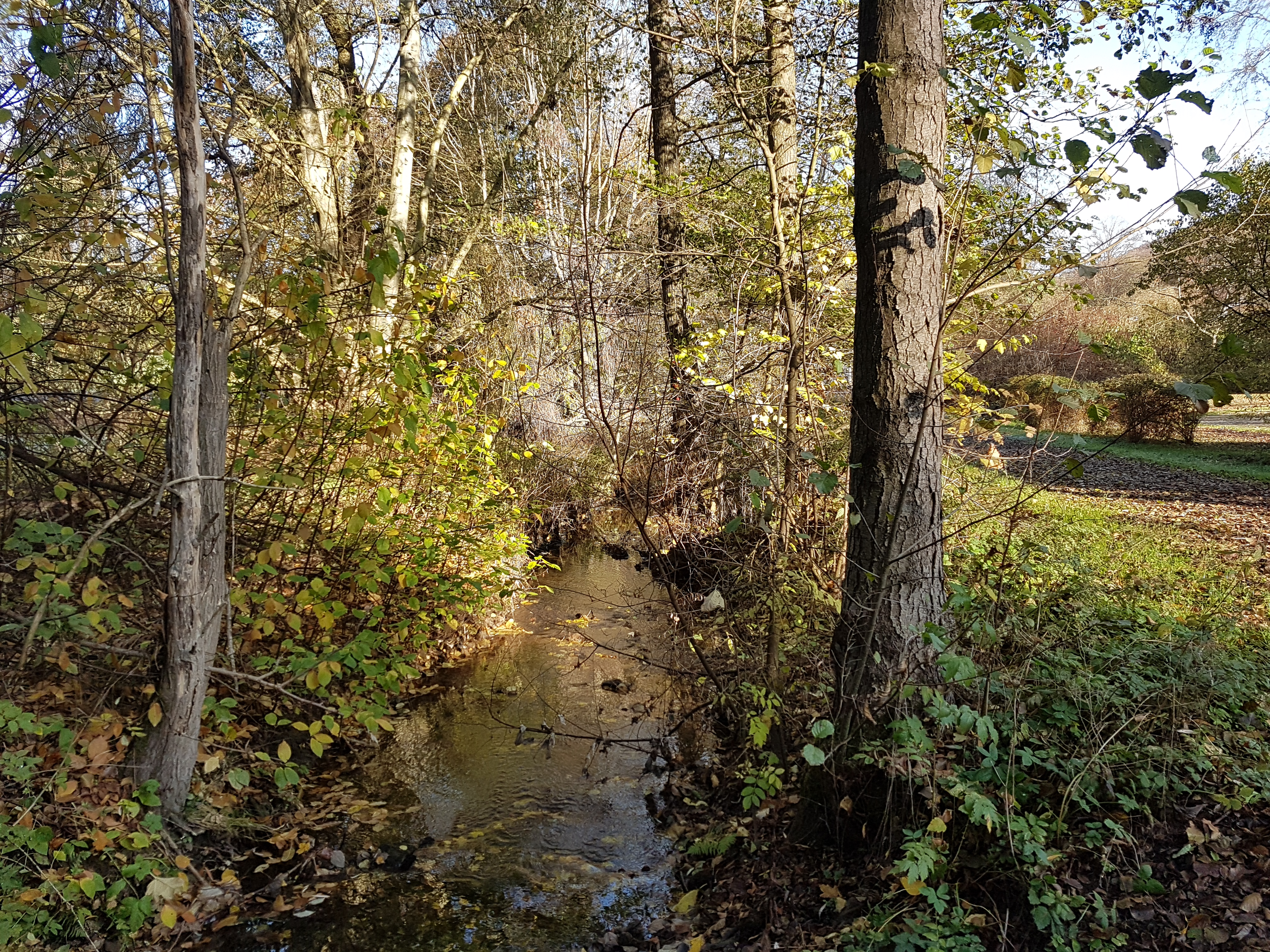

Location
- Country: Germany
- State: Hesse

Physical characteristics
- Mouth
  - location: Eder
  - coordinates: 51.1364°N 9.1762°E
- Length: 17.2 km (10.7 mi)

Basin features
- Progression: Eder→ Fulda→ Weser→ North Sea

Wilde (also: Wölfte) is a river of Hesse, Germany. It passes through Bad Wildungen, and flows into the Eder in Wega.

== See also ==
- List of rivers of Hesse
