= Edertal =

- Municipality
- Coat of arms

- Location of Edertal within Waldeck-Frankenberg district
- Interactive map of Edertal
- Location within Germany Location within Hesse
- Coordinates: 51°10′N 09°06′E
- Country: Germany
- State: Hesse
- Admin. region: Kassel
- District: Waldeck-Frankenberg

Government
  - Mayor (2018–24): Klaus Gier (Ind.)

Area
  - Total: 115.65 km^{2} (44.65 sq mi)
- Elevation: 226 m (741 ft)

Population (2025-12-31)
  - Total: 6,113
  - Density: 52.86/km^{2} (136.9/sq mi)
- Time zone: UTC+01:00 (CET)
  - Summer (DST): UTC+02:00 (CEST)
- Postal codes: 34549
- Dialling codes: 05623, 05621
- Vehicle registration: KB
- Website: www.edertal.de

Edertal (German pronunciation: [ˈeːdɐtaːl], lit. 'Eder Valley') is a municipality in Waldeck-Frankenberg in northern Hesse, Germany.

== Geography ==
=== Location ===
Edertal lies roughly 30 km in a straight line southwest of Kassel. It is on the north and northwest edges of the Kellerwald range and stretches to the south shore of the Edersee and south and southwest of its dam. It lies at the eastern edge of the Kellerwald-Edersee National Park, a small part of which is inside municipal limits.

The municipality of Edertal is crossed by the river Eder, the biggest body of flowing water in the municipality, from northwest to southeast. Into this empties the Wesebach at the constituent municipality of Giflitz. The Affolderner See, which is found within municipal limits, is another reservoir used as lower reservoir for the Waldeck Pumped Storage Station (one of Germany's largest hydro power stations) and for recreation.

On the whole, hydroelectric use at the Edersee is also well developed.

=== Neighbouring municipalities ===
Edertal borders in the north on the town of Waldeck, in the east on the towns of Naumburg (Kassel district) and Fritzlar (Schwalm-Eder-Kreis), in the south on the town of Bad Wildungen, and in the west on the town of Frankenau and the municipality of Vöhl (all three in Waldeck-Frankenberg).

=== Constituent municipalities ===
In Giflitz is the municipality's administrative seat. With the neighbouring centre of Bergheim to the northeast, it forms the heart of the municipality and, accordingly, a lower centre in the Regional Plan (in terms of Walter Christaller's Central Place Theory).

The municipality of Edertal consists of the following centres:

- Affoldern
- Anraff
- Bergheim
- Böhne
- Bringhausen
- Buhlen
- Gellershausen
- Giflitz
- Hemfurth-Edersee
- Kleinern
- Königshagen
- Mehlen
- Wellen

Bringhausen was one of three villages that originally stood where the Edersee is now. It was relocated to higher ground early in the 20th century.

=== Geology ===
The area belongs to the foothills of the Rhenish Slate Mountains. Outcrops here are mainly shale and greywacke.

== Politics ==
=== Municipal council ===
Edertal's council is made up of 31 councillors, with seats apportioned thus, in accordance with municipal elections held on 26 March 2006:

SPD	14 seats
CDU	9 seats
FWG	5 seats
FDP	3 seats

Note: FWG is a citizens' coalition.

- Elections in March 2016:
- CDU: 6
- SPD: 10
- Greens: 3
- FDP: 3
- FW: 6
- WIR: 3

== Mayor ==
In November 2012 Klaus Gier (independent) was elected the new mayor.
