= Sophie Wolff-Fritz =

Sophie Wolff-Fritz (15 July 1858 – 1938) was a German composer, singer and teacher. She was born in Vohl and studied singing in Darmstadt under Luise Muller, and later under Femy Schnyder. Woff-Fritz taught in a nursery school and at the Kirschbaum Institute before moving to Buenos Aires in 1891, where she was the principal of a music school until 1904. After 1907, she returned to Berlin and taught singing there. She wrote at least one article on singing, which was published in 1921. Her compositions for voice and piano include:

- Children's Songs (1912-1928)
- Fate
- Five Songs (1912-1922)
- Peace
- Picture
- Prayer
