= Elbe (Eder) =

River in Germany

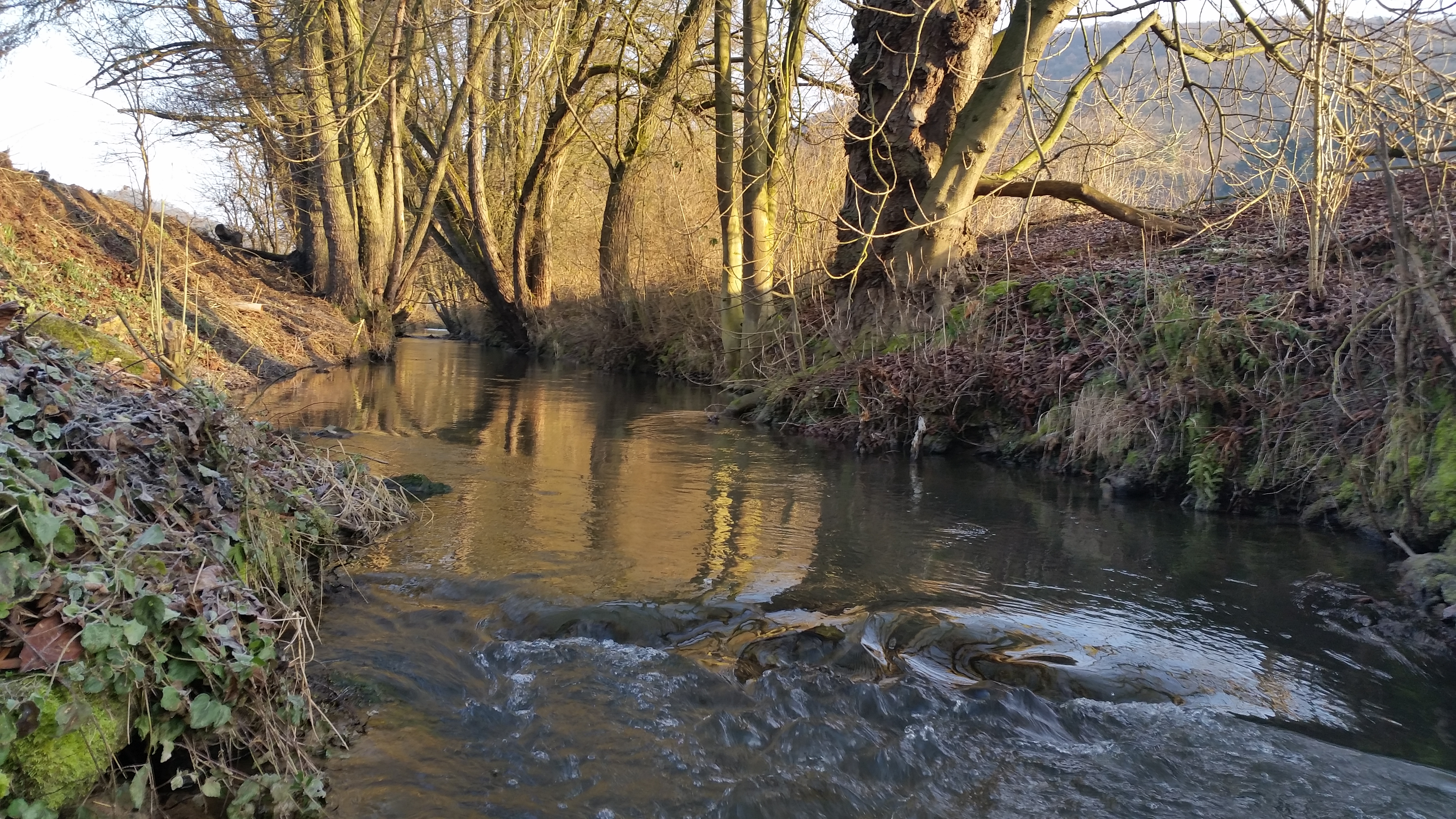

Location
- Country: Germany
- State: Hesse

Physical characteristics
- Mouth
  - location: Eder
  - coordinates: 51.1257°N 9.2468°E
- Length: 33.7 km (20.9 mi)
- Basin size: 123 km^{2} (47 sq mi)

Basin features
- Progression: Eder→ Fulda→ Weser→ North Sea

Elbe (German pronunciation: [ˈɛlbə]) is a river of Hesse, Germany. It flows into the Eder near Fritzlar.

== See also ==
- List of rivers of Hesse
