= Eisenberg (Korbach) =

Coordinates: 51°15′04″N 8°49′38″E

Highest point
- Elevation: 562 m (1,844 ft)

Geography
- Location: Landkreis Waldeck-Frankenberg, Hesse, Germany

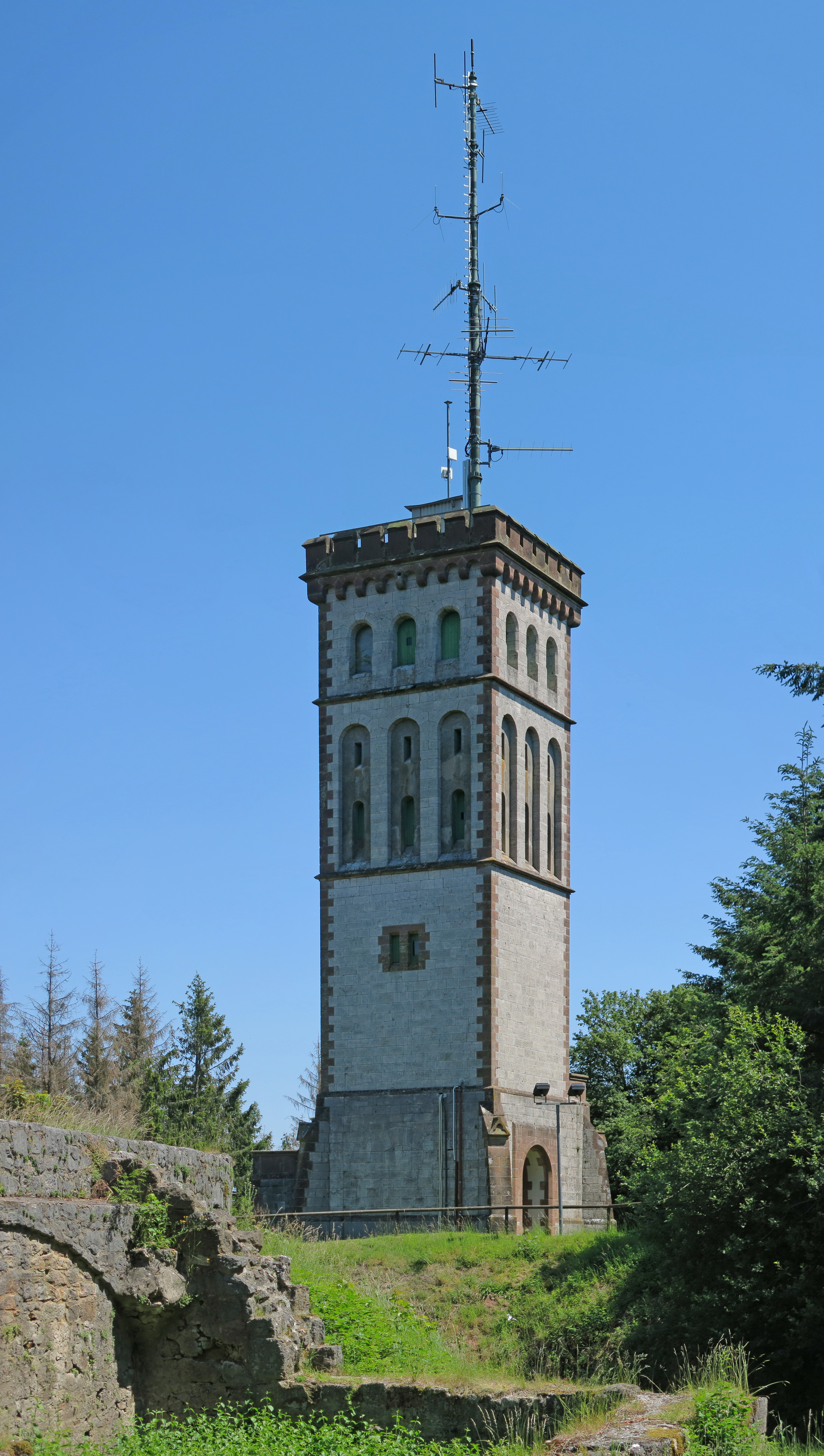
Georg-Viktor Tower on Eisenberg.

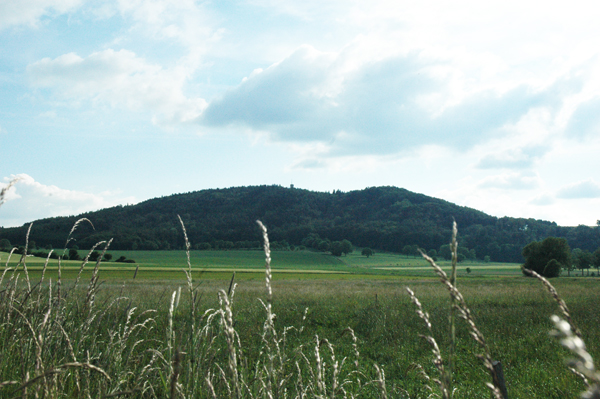
Eisenberg near Korbach

The Eisenberg (German pronunciation: [ˈaɪzn̩bɛʁk]) is a hill in the county of Landkreis Waldeck-Frankenberg, district of Hesse, Germany. It is a part of the East Sauerland mountain range, bordering the Korbach Plain. There is a gold deposit, ruined castle, and the Georg-Viktor observation tower on the summit.
