= Natz =

Natz may refer to:

== People ==
- Jack Natz, American bass guitarist and vocalist

== Places ==
- Natz-Schabs, Italy
