= Notz =

Notz is a surname. Notable people with the surname include:

- Dieter Notz (born 18 September 1955), German cross-country skier
- Florian Notz (born 24 April 1992), German cross-country skier
- Jedrij Notz (born 6 September 1974), Swiss-born alpine skier
- Juan Notz (born 21 October 1939), Venezuelan former tennis player
- Konstantin von Notz (born 21 January 1971), German lawyer and politician
- Walter Notz, Swiss footballer
