= Netzer =

Netzer may refer to:

- Netzer Olami, a worldwide Jewish organization for youth.
- Amnon Netzer, Iranian-Israeli historian
- Călin Peter Netzer, Romanian film director
- Ehud Netzer, Israeli archaeologist
- Erika Netzer (1937–1977), Austrian alpine skier
- Günter Netzer, (born 1944), a former German football player and manager
- Joseph Netzer, former mayor of Arlon in Belgium
- Josef Netzer (1808-1864), Austrian composer
- Michael Netzer, (born 1955), American comics artist
- Patrick Netzer, Swiss curler
