= Vöhl =

- Municipality
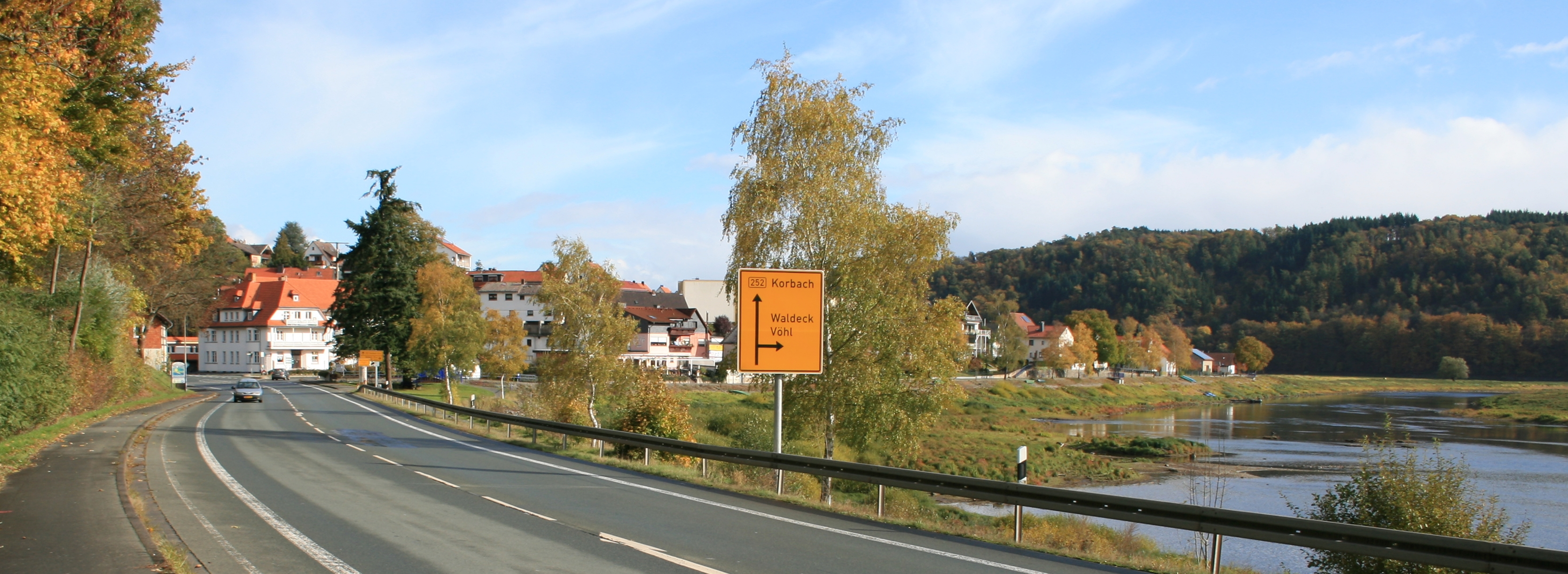

- Coat of arms

- Location of Vöhl within Waldeck-Frankenberg district
- Interactive map of Vöhl
- Location within Germany Location within Hesse
- Coordinates: 51°12′N 08°56′E
- Country: Germany
- State: Hesse
- Admin. region: Kassel
- District: Waldeck-Frankenberg

Government
  - Mayor (2019–25): Karsten Kalhöfer

Area
  - Total: 98.85 km^{2} (38.17 sq mi)
- Elevation: 302 m (991 ft)

Population (2025-12-31)
  - Total: 5,445
  - Density: 55.08/km^{2} (142.7/sq mi)
- Time zone: UTC+01:00 (CET)
  - Summer (DST): UTC+02:00 (CEST)
- Postal codes: 34516
- Dialling codes: 05635
- Vehicle registration: KB
- Website: www.voehl.de

Vöhl (German pronunciation: [føːl]) is a municipality in Waldeck-Frankenberg in Hesse, Germany, not far southwest of Kassel.

== Geography ==
=== Location ===
Vöhl lies in the northern part of the Kellerwald-Edersee Nature Park on the Edersee, a man-made lake. It is located 40 kilometers southwest of Kassel.

=== Neighbouring municipalities ===
Vöhl borders in the north on the town of Korbach, in the east on the town of Waldeck and the municipality of Edertal, in the south on the towns of Frankenau and Frankenberg, and in the west on the town of Lichtenfels (all in Waldeck-Frankenberg).

=== Constituent municipalities ===
Vöhl consists of the following mostly quite small centres spread out northwestwards and southeastwards from the western end of the Edersee.

- Asel – including Asel-Süd
- Basdorf
- Buchenberg
- Dorfitter
- Ederbringhausen
- Harbshausen
- Herzhausen
- Kirchlotheim
- Marienhagen
- Niederorke
- Obernburg
- Oberorke
- Schmittlotheim
- Thalitter
- Vöhl (administrative centre)

==== Asel ====
Asel is the only constituent municipality that lies on both sides of the man-made lake. It is thus divided into two parts:

- Asel "proper" lies on a mountain north of the Edersee.
- Asel-Süd lies on the northern slope of the Kellerwald, on the lake's south shore and right on the northern boundary of the Kellerwald-Edersee park.

Furthermore, Asel, just like Bringhausen a short way to the east, lies in a "dead end", at least from a traffic engineering point of view, meaning that it can only be reached from the western end of the lake from Herzhausen through Harbshausen, as barely any roads run through the hardly developed northern part of the Kellerwald.

==== Basdorf ====
Basdorf lies on a mountain north of the Edersee. Part of it is a holiday village called Trappenhart, built above the village proper.

==== Dorfitter ====
Dorfitter lies next to the circuit city Korbach. There live about 900 inhabitants. Famous is the picture of the canvas in the church. It's the oldest in Hesse.

==== Marienhagen ====
Marienhagen is Vöhl's second biggest constituent municipality. Besides the lovely village heart built around the Evangelical church, there are also two "new town" areas. After the Second World War, many Germans who had been driven from lost territories to the east – most of them were from the Sudetenland – were integrated into Marienhagen. The current (16 August 2005) population is just below 1000.

Alongside the gymnastic club founded by Fritz and Otto Lohof, Wilhelm Bauch, Karl Müller and others, there is a men's singing club, a women's choir, the volunteer fire brigade, a senior citizens' club, the pond association (Teichgemeinschaft) and the Club Saskatchewan 1972.

In 1959, a swimming pool was built, after a gym had already opened in 1926. By the late 1960s, a ski-jumping arena and a downhill skiing run were inviting people to partake of winter sports.

==== Obernburg ====
Obernburg lies at the edge of the Kuhbach Valley on a hill. Its attractions include not only a little Protestant church but also the Drachenhöhle ("Dragon's Cave"). From the cave, lying on the village's outskirts, a secret passage leads under the pulpit in the church. In earlier times, this was used as an escape route.

=== Waterways ===
- Eder
- Edersee
- Itter (river)
- Orke (river)
- Asel (brook)
- lake near Kirchlotheim

== History ==
Archaeological finds have established that there has been continuous habitation in the area since the Stone Age.

In the Early Middle Ages, the border between the Saxon and Frankish tribal homelands ran through what is now Vöhl, as still witnessed by the Sprachgrenze, or language border, running east to west between Central German and Low German astride which the municipality sits.

Vöhl's municipal area is roughly coëxtensive with the old lordly domain of Itter, which in the High Middle Ages developed in the former Ittergau. After the Lords of Itter died out, the area was split between the Landgraviate of Hesse and the Electorate of Mainz.

After meanwhile being pledged to the Counts of Waldeck and the Wolff von Gudensberg family, the Itter domain became part of Hesse for good in 1589. Disputed as it was between Hesse-Kassel (or Hesse-Cassel) and Hesse-Darmstadt, in 1650, it passed once and for all to the latter and formed an enclave inside Waldeck territory. In 1821, as part of administrative reform, the Itter domain became the district of Vöhl, until in 1866 it passed to Prussia and was united with Frankenberg district in 1886.

=== Basdorf ===
About Basdorf's founding and the time thereafter up until the village's first documentary mention in 1206, nothing is clear. It seems likely that, owing to soil and water factors, Basdorf was an early settlement centre here in the tribal marches between the Chatti and the Cherusci. Together with the other places in the Ittergau it would hence have held an important place with regards to through traffic and north-south trade.

Since the deaconate of Vöhl fell under the ecclesiastical jurisdiction of the Archbishop of Mainz, it is assumed that the area around nearby Fritzlar, or rather the Büraburg, was Christianized by Saint Boniface or his followers before Charlemagne's years-long Saxon Wars, into which the local border region was drawn.

Documents surviving today show how Basdorf grew from a village of free farmers bit by bit into an estate of the Werbe Monastery and into a small part of the Berich Monastery. Furthermore, the documents show how the Ittergau, to which Basdorf belonged, many times became the object of its stronger neighbours' disputes.

In 1810 came the Kampf den Maikäfern – the "Struggle against the Cockchafers" – and its larvae, the white grubs. One leaflet sent throughout the village declared that every farmer was to decrease this pest as much as he could, sparing no effort to that end. It furthermore suggested feeding the dead cockchafers to chickens, ducks and geese, with a warning that these birds should also get plenty of water, as cockchafers tended to make them very thirsty. Swine, too, enjoyed cockchafers, according to the leaflet.

In 1875, Basdorf's children were given a new school when a dismantled house was bought over in Asel and reassembled in Basdorf as a place for teaching the village's children. In 1878, the village bought a new hand-driven fire pump. In 1879, the men's singing club was founded by Johann Christian Bangert, whose thirst for adventure once led him on a 120-day sailing voyage to Australia, and whose homesickness 20 years later led him back to Basdorf.

Basdorf farmers became milk suppliers to the Höringhausen Dairy in 1885, and in 1892, Basdorf became an independent parish with a branch in Oberwerba. In 1900, the postal coach connection came to an end. In 1919, electricity and running water came to the village. In 1920, the streets were lit and a threshing municipality was founded. The Basdorf Gymnastic and Sport Club was founded in 1922.

In 1934, the volunteer fire brigade was founded.

In 1946, Basdorf took in 165 refugees from former German territories out of which they had been driven, thereby giving the school a reason to hire a further teacher in 1948. Between 1952 and 1986, Basdorf was connected to the sewer system. In 1960, the Basdorf Gymnastic and Sport Club was brought back to life as a football and sport club. In 1964, school ended in Basdorf when all school functions were transferred to Vöhl (main town).

In the 1972 contest "Unser Dorf" ("Our Village"), Basdorf was deemed to be Hesse's second prettiest village. Basdorf became part of Vöhl in 1974.

In 2006 Basdorf celebrated 800 years of existence with a weeklong festival.

=== Amalgamations ===
On 1 February 1971, the municipalities of Dorfitter, Herzhausen and Thalitter merged into the municipality of Ittertal, and Vöhl formed with Asel and Basdorf a new municipality. On 1 January 1972, the municipality of Hessenstein was formed out of Buchenberg, Ederbringhausen, Harbshausen, Kirchlotheim, Niederorke, Oberorke and Schmittlotheim. The municipalities of Marienhagen and Obernburg for the time being remained independent.

On 1 January 1974, the municipalities of Hessenstein, Marienhagen, Obernburg, Ittertal and Vöhl merged into the greater municipality of Vöhl. The administrative seat is in the original village of Vöhl.

== Politics ==
=== Municipal council ===
Vöhl's council is made up of 31 councillors, with seats apportioned thus, in accordance with municipal elections held on 26 March 2006:

SPD	11 seats
CDU	8 seats
FWG	7 seats
FDP	3 seats
BI-Grüne Liste	2 seats

Note: FWG and BI-Grüne Liste are citizens' coalitions.

=== Coat of arms ===
Vöhl's civic coat of arms might heraldically be described thus: In argent a hill vert upon which a castle gules with tower dexter, the whole with roof azure, before the castle an inescutcheon in which in azure a lion rampant party per fess, above argent, below gules, crowned Or, armed argent and langued gules.

These arms were bestowed upon the municipality on 17 August 1977 with the Hessian Interior Minister's approval.

=== Partnerships ===
- Mouchard, département of Jura, France, since 1986
- (Germany) Basdorf, Brandenburg, since 1990

== Culture and sightseeing ==
- Maize labyrinth at the Edersee
- Edersee
- Schloss Waldeck (nearby stately home)
- The neighbouring Kellerwald
- Hof Lauterbach
- Itterburg (castle ruins)
- Gerichtslinde ("Court Linden") with memorial
- Church in the middle of Basdorf
- Half-timbered buildings in Basdorf

== Personalities ==
- George III, Landgrave of Hesse-Itter (1632-1676), Landgraf of Hesse-Darmstadt-Itter
- Friedrich Karl Henkel (1848-1930), industrialist, founder of the Henkel Group
- Sophie Wolff-Fritz (1858-1938), composer
- Jan Jansen (born 1945), Dutch cyclist, born in Basdorf
- Felicitas Woll (born 1980), actress
