= Naumburg, Hesse =

Naumburg
- Town
- Coat of arms

- Location of Naumburg within Kassel district
- Interactive map of Naumburg
- Location within Germany Location within Hesse
- Coordinates: 51°15′N 9°10′E
- Country: Germany
- State: Hesse
- Admin. region: Kassel
- District: Kassel
- Subdivisions: 5 districts

Government
  - Mayor (2019–25): Stefan Hable

Area
  - Total: 66.32 km^{2} (25.61 sq mi)
- Elevation: 210–450 m (690–1,480 ft)

Population (2025-12-31)
  - Total: 4,890
  - Density: 73.7/km^{2} (191/sq mi)
- Time zone: UTC+01:00 (CET)
  - Summer (DST): UTC+02:00 (CEST)
- Postal codes: 34311
- Dialling codes: 05625
- Vehicle registration: KS
- Website: www.naumburg.eu

Naumburg (German pronunciation: [ˈnaʊmbʊɐ̯k]) is a town in the district of Kassel, in Hesse, Germany. It is located 25 km southwest of Kassel on the German Timber-Frame Road.
