= Eder (Fulda) =

River in Germany

Eder Edder
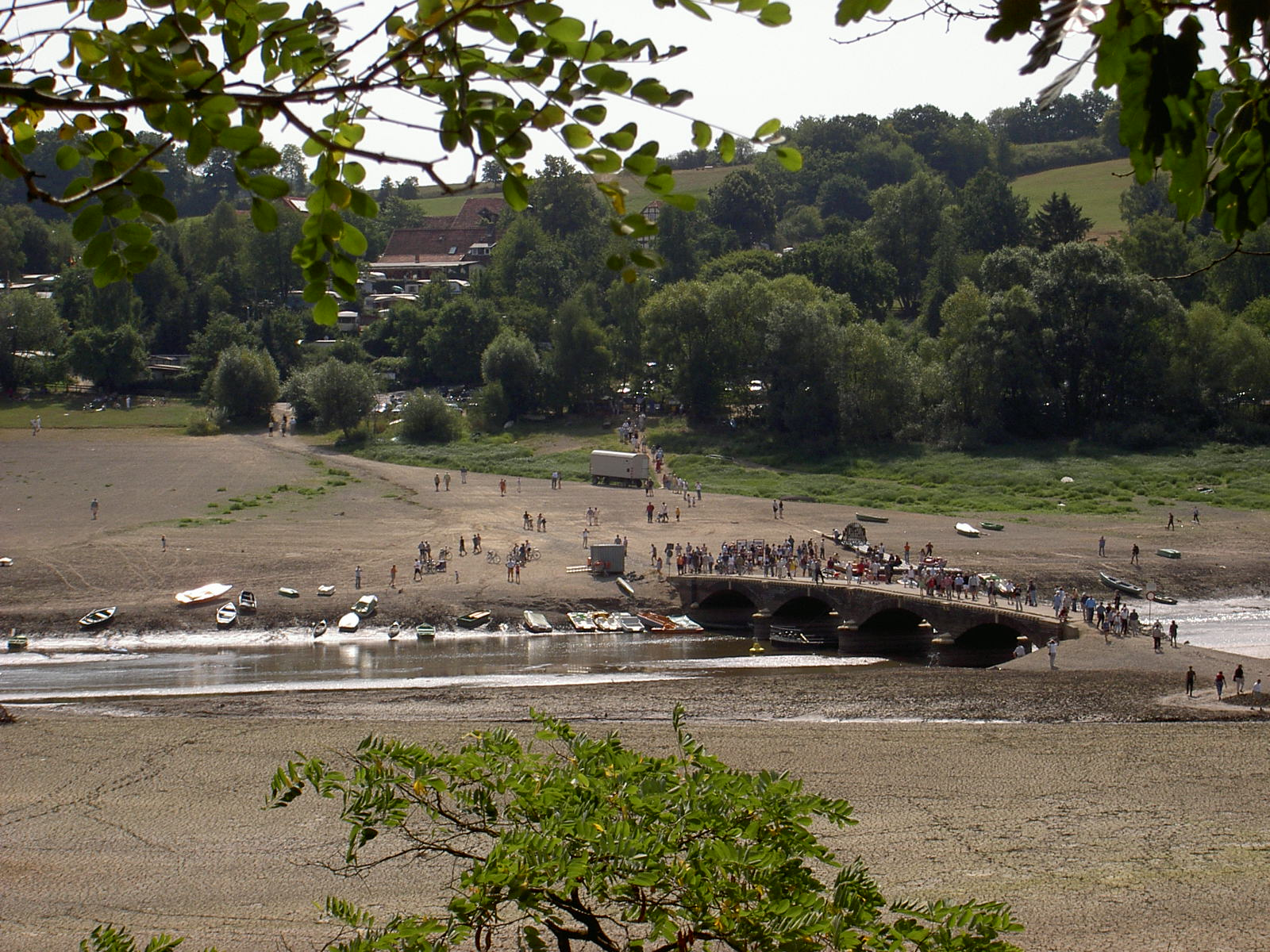
- The Eder in Edersee when the lake dried out in 2003

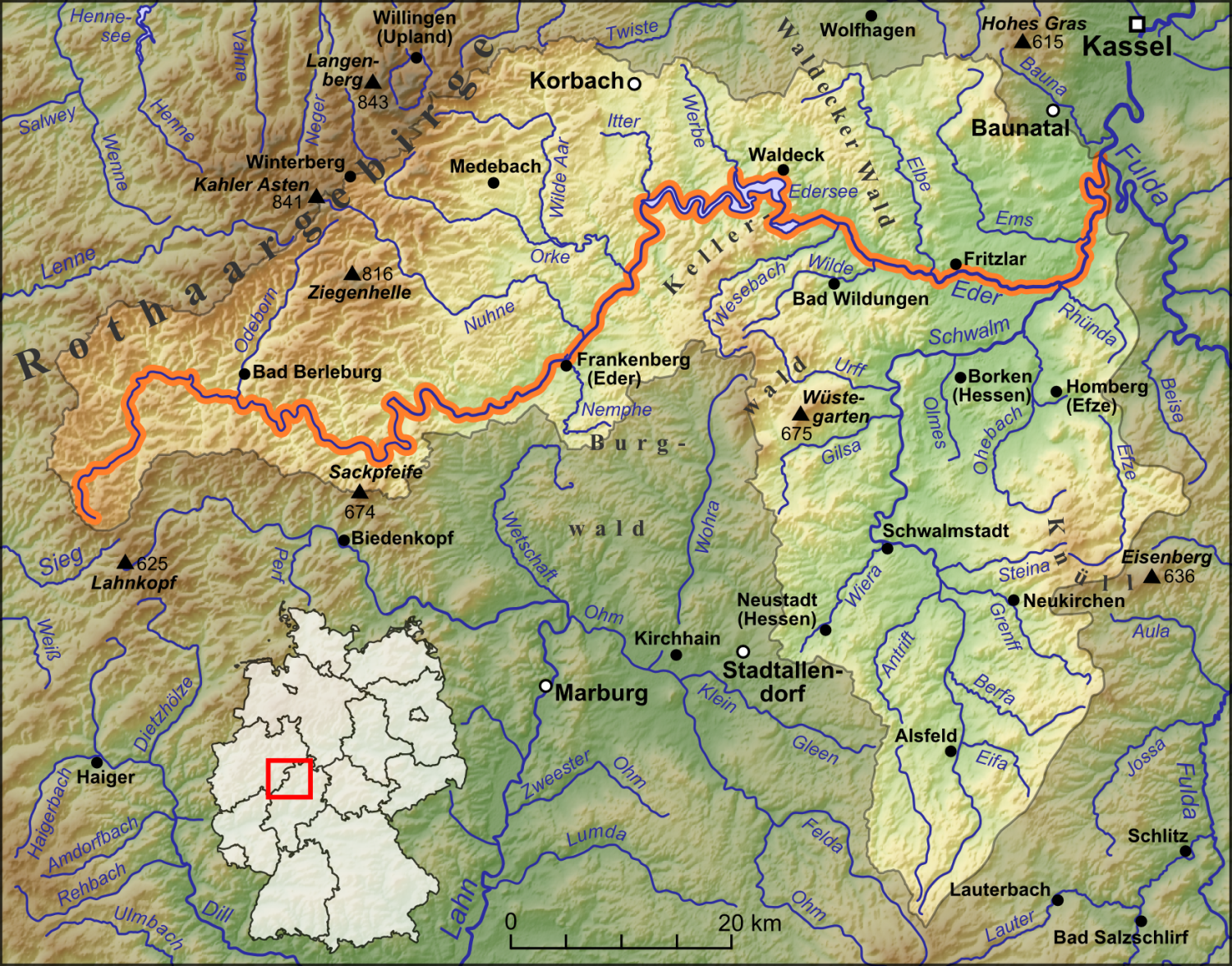
- Map of the Eder, its tributaries and water catchment area
- Etymology: Adrana-Aderna-Adarna-Adrina-Edder-Eder
- Native name: Eder (German)

Location
- Country: Germany
- States: North Rhine-Westphalia-Hesse

Physical characteristics
- Source
  - location: Ederkopf
  - elevation: 634 m (2,080 ft)
- Mouth
  - location: Edermünde
  - coordinates: 51.216677°N 9.455075°E
  - elevation: 142 m (466 ft)
- Length: 176.1 km (109.4 mi)
- Basin size: 3,362 km^{2} (1,298 sq mi)
- Discharge
  - average: 23.8 m^{3}/s (840 cu ft/s)

Basin features
- Progression: Fulda→ Weser→ North Sea
- Tributaries
  - left: main: Odeborg, Orke, Ems. see also below
  - right: main: Nuhne, Wesebach, Schwalm. see also below

The Eder (German pronunciation: [ˈeːdɐ]) is a 177-kilometre-long (110 mi) major river in Germany that begins in eastern North Rhine-Westphalia and passes into Hesse, where it empties into the River Fulda.

== History ==
The river was first mentioned by the Roman historian Tacitus. In his Annals, he describes the Roman campaign against the Chatti under the command of Germanicus in 15 AD. Forty-five thousand soldiers of the Roman army destroyed the major centre of the Chatti, Mattium, directly after they crossed the Adrana (Eder).

In the Middle Ages, the river was known by the names Aderna, Adarna and Adrina.

On the banks of the Eder, in the town of Schwarzenau, near Bad Berleburg, a religious (Anabaptist) group, the Schwarzenau Brethren, was founded in August 1708. Eight adults were completely baptised thrice in the Eder. This group emigrated to America where its members are still to be found.

As late as the end of the 19th century, the river was also known in local dialect as Edder. For instance, in Felsberg-Gensungen, the pharmacy is known as the Edder-Apotheke.

== Gold in the Eder ==
Sediments of the Eder contain a proportion of gold. The majority of this gold is said to originate from Eisenberg (Korbach), which contains one of the largest reserves of gold in Middle Europe. Gold is eroded out of the Eisenberg, for example, by the Itter stream, which, since the Edersee dam was built, flows into the Edersee lake.

Gold panning in the Eder has been known since 1308. The main historical area for panning the gold is between Affoldern and Fritzlar. In the 14th century, the Teutonic Order panned gold out of the Eder sediments near Obermöllrich. In the 18th century, even ducats were minted from Eder gold; they are collector's items today.

Up to the 1970s, school children from Duisburg, who stayed at a nearby holiday camp, together with a teacher from Marienhagen, part of the town of Vöhl, went panning for gold in the sediments of the River Itter. Panning for gold along the Eder is still popular.

== Course ==
The river rises from the Ederkopf mountain in the Rothaar mountain range in eastern North Rhine-Westphalia, near the springs of the Lahn and Sieg rivers. However, unlike the Lahn and Sieg, which are both tributaries of the Rhine, the Eder flows east and north, into the river Fulda at Edermünde, south of Kassel. The Fulda then converges with the Werra River at Hann. Münden to form the Weser River, which flows into the North Sea.

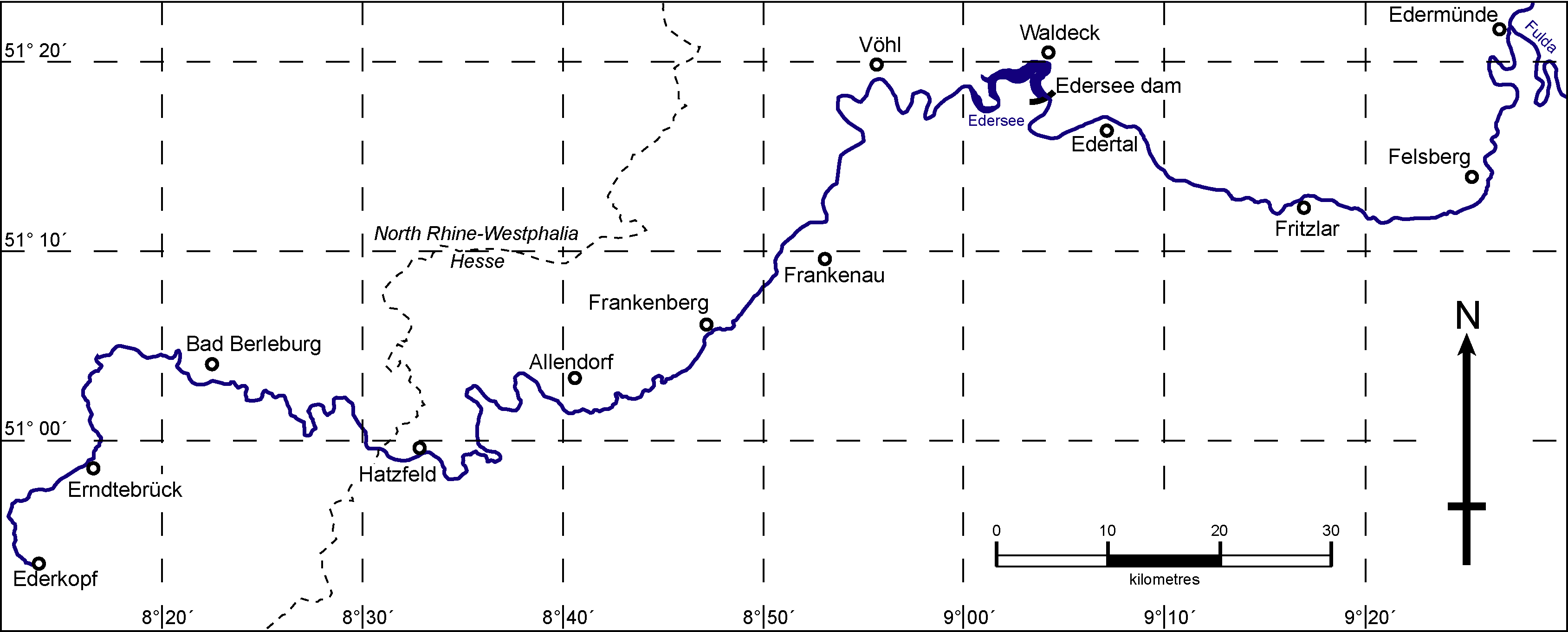
Course of the River Eder

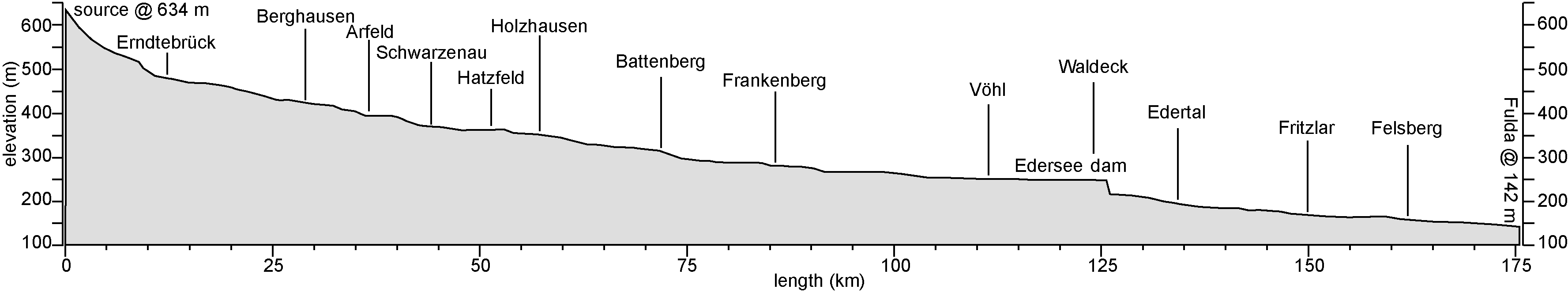
River profile of the Eder

== Edersee Dam ==
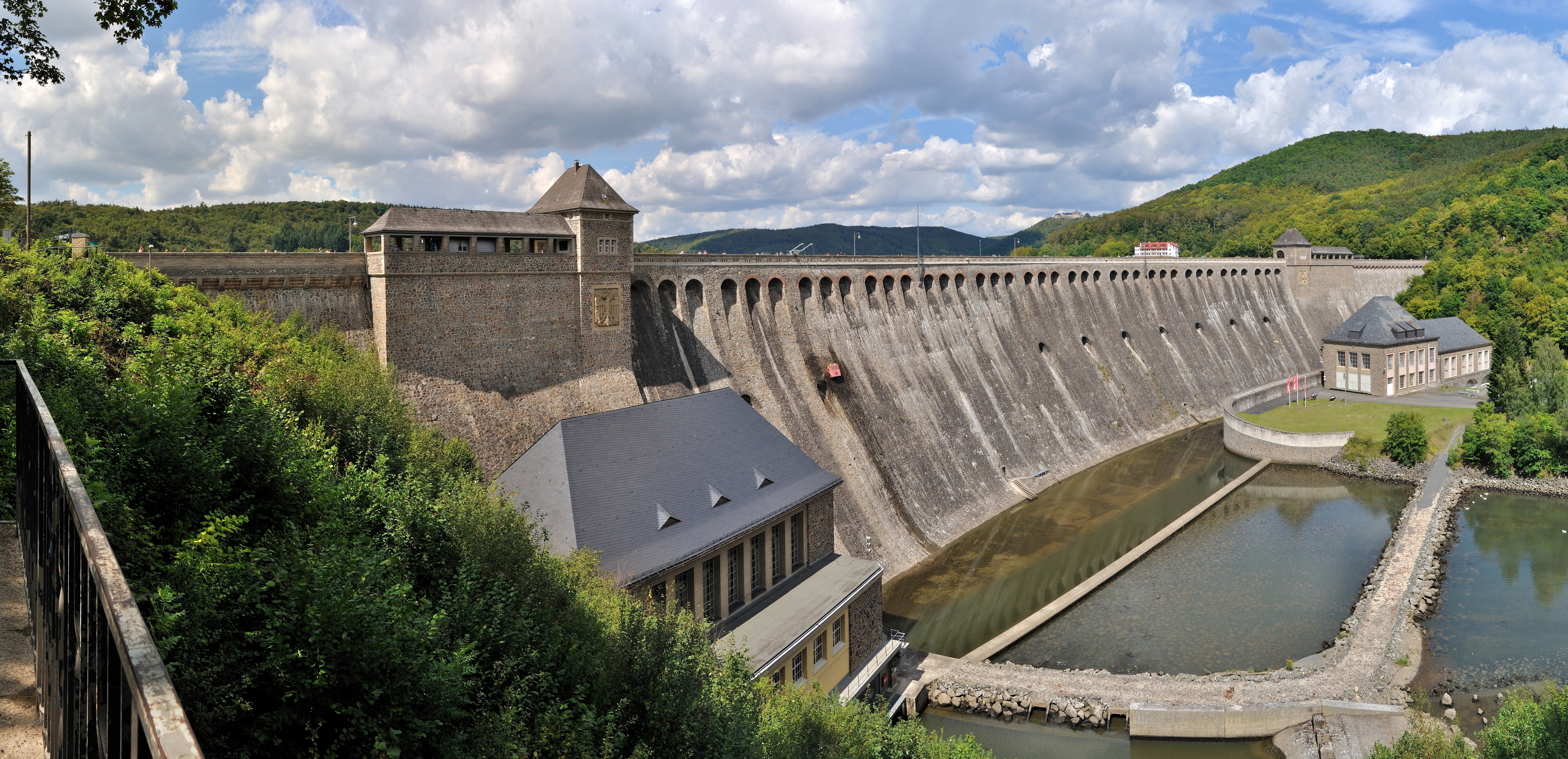
Edersee Dam near Waldeck

The Edersee Dam is situated below the town of Waldeck. The rock-and-concrete dam is 47 metres (154 ft) high and 400 metres (1,300 ft) long. It was completed in 1914; in 2014 its 100th birthday was celebrated. It forms the Edersee lake, which is 27 kilometres (17 mi) long and contains 200 million cubic metres of water. This is used to generate hydroelectricity and regulate water levels for shipping on the Weser river.

At low water in late summer, and during dry years, the remnants of three villages (Asel, Bringhausen, and Berich) and a bridge across the original riverbed, which was submerged when the lake was filled in 1914, can be seen. Descendants of those buried there go to visit the graves of their ancestors.

== Destruction of the Eder dam ==
Animation of the principle of the bouncing bomb. The bomb is dropped close to the surface of the lake. Because it is moving almost horizontally, at high velocity and with backspin, it bounces several times instead of sinking. Each bounce is smaller than the previous one. The "bomb run" is calculated so that at its final bounce, the bomb will reach close to the target, where it sinks. A depth charge causes it to explode at the right depth, creating destructive shockwaves.

On the night of the 17 May 1943, Avro Lancaster bombers of the RAF 617 Squadron used specially developed bouncing bombs (codename: Upkeep) that were engineered by Barnes Wallis. They were used to destroy the Möhne and Eder dams, as part of Operation Chastise. The dam was repaired and in use again before the end of the year. The story of the raid was documented by the 1955 film called The Dam Busters.

== Tributaries of the Eder ==
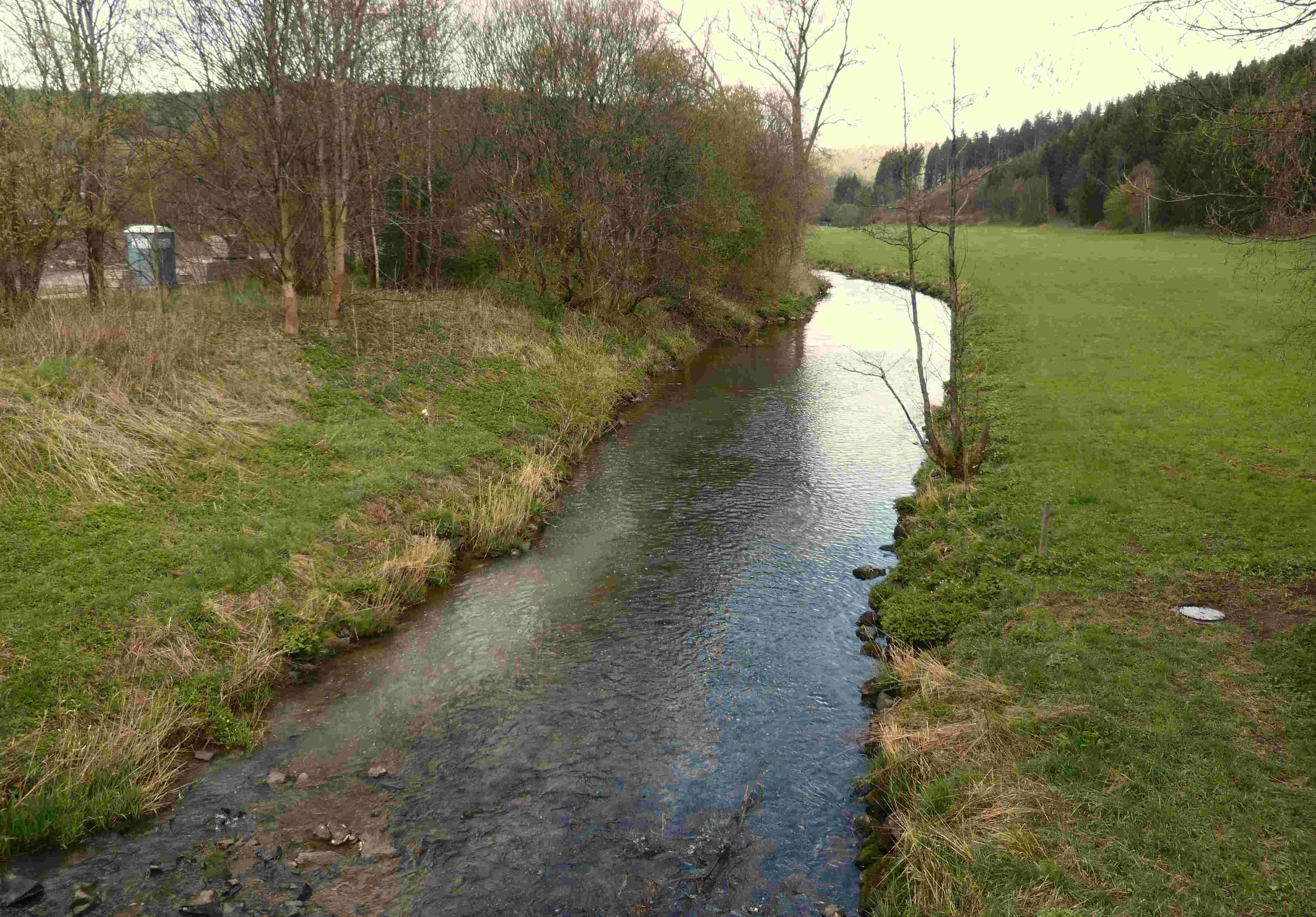
The Eder at Goddelsbach (Erndtebrück)

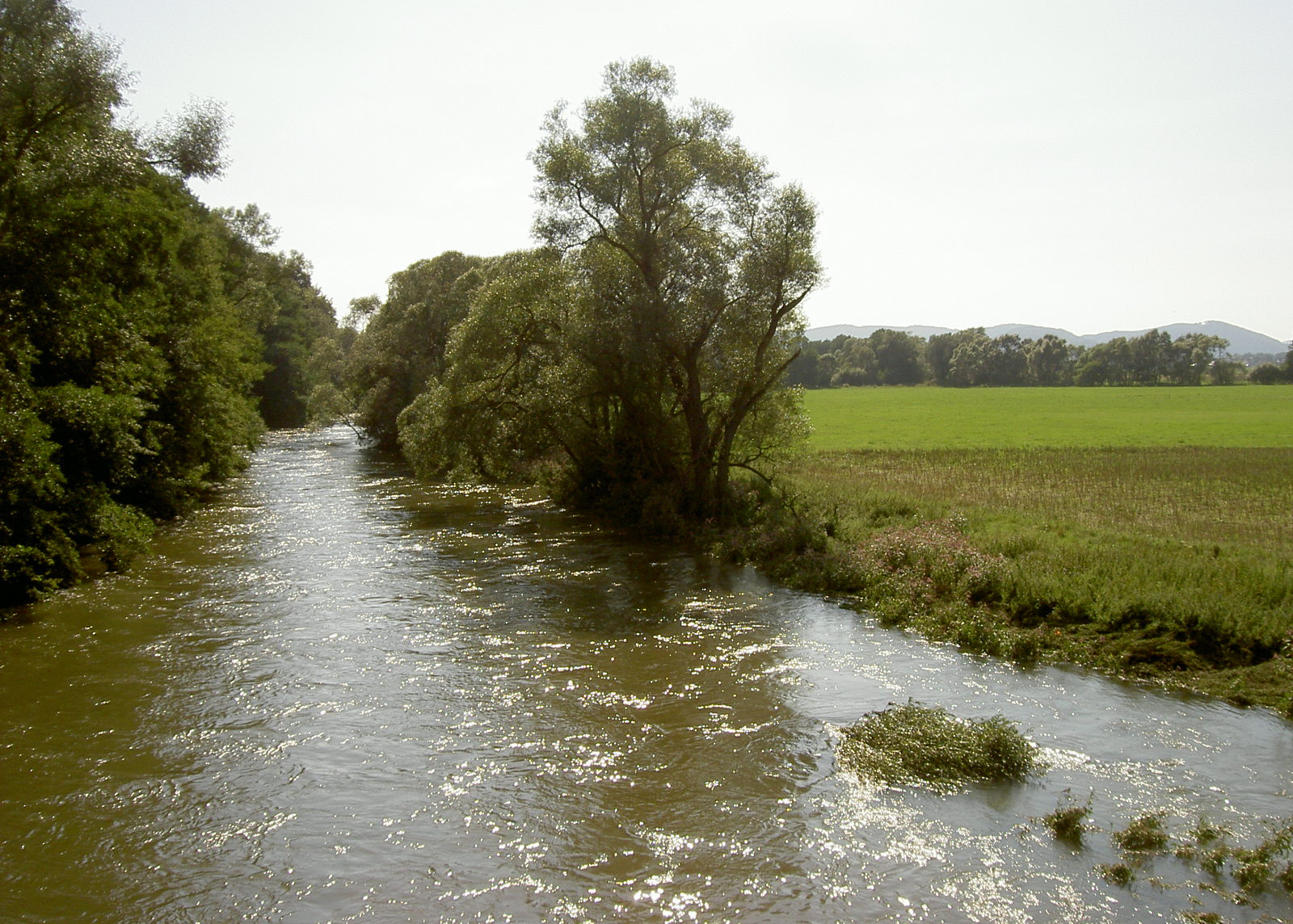
The Eder near Frankenberg

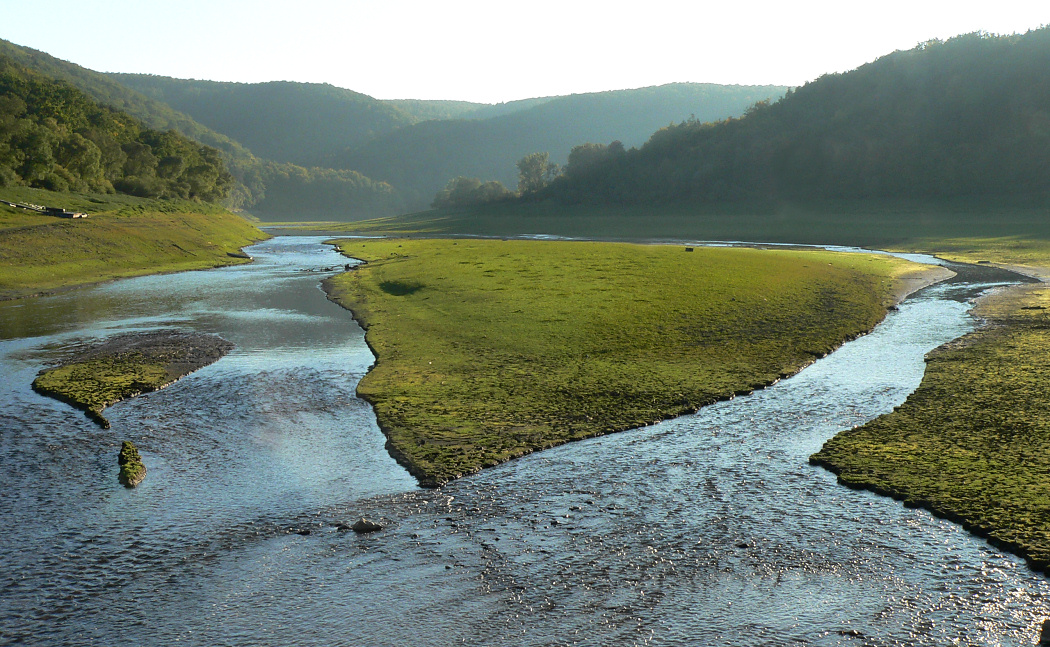
The Eder in the Edersee at low water near Asel

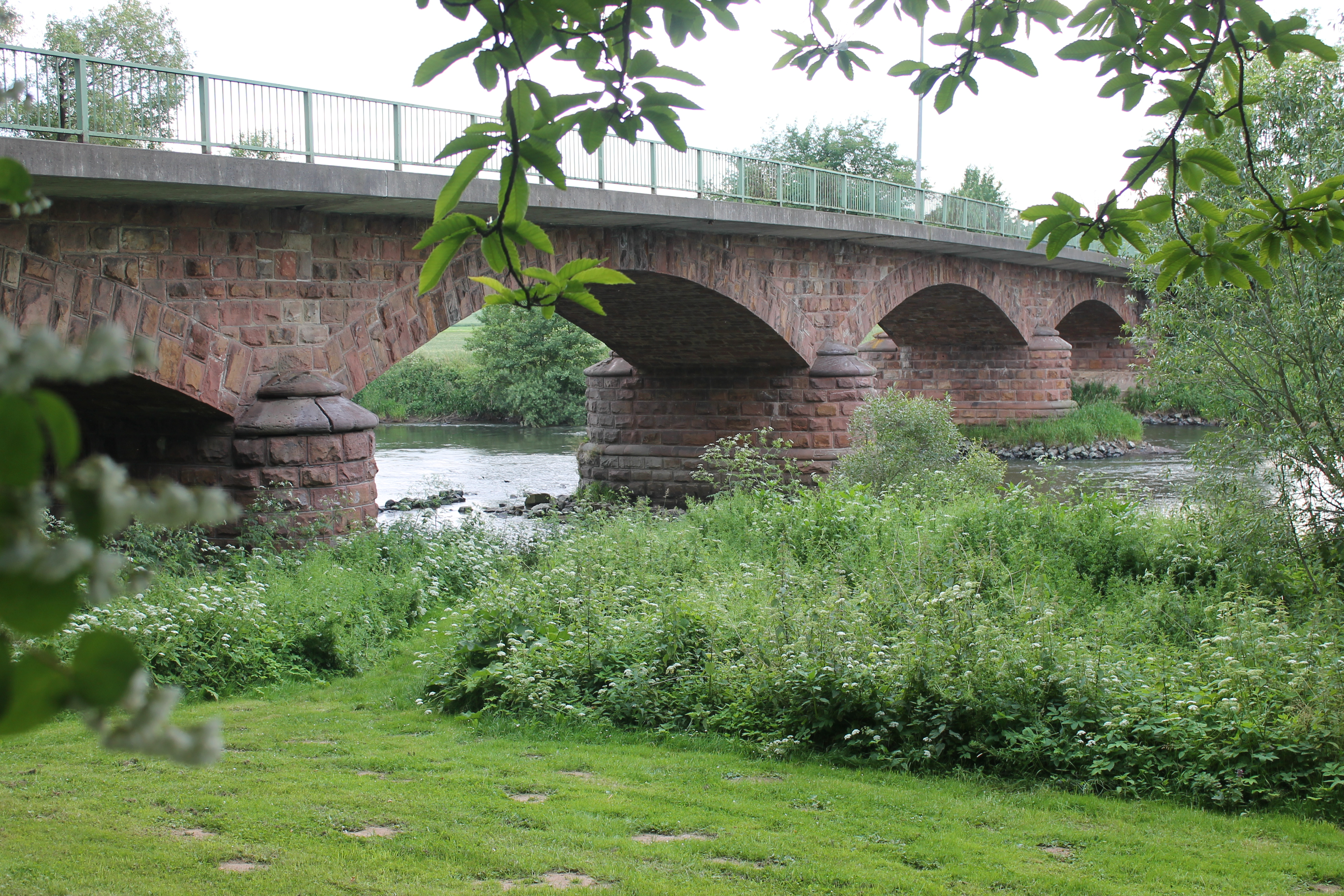
The sandstone bridge over the Eder between Altenbrunslar und Neuenbrunslar

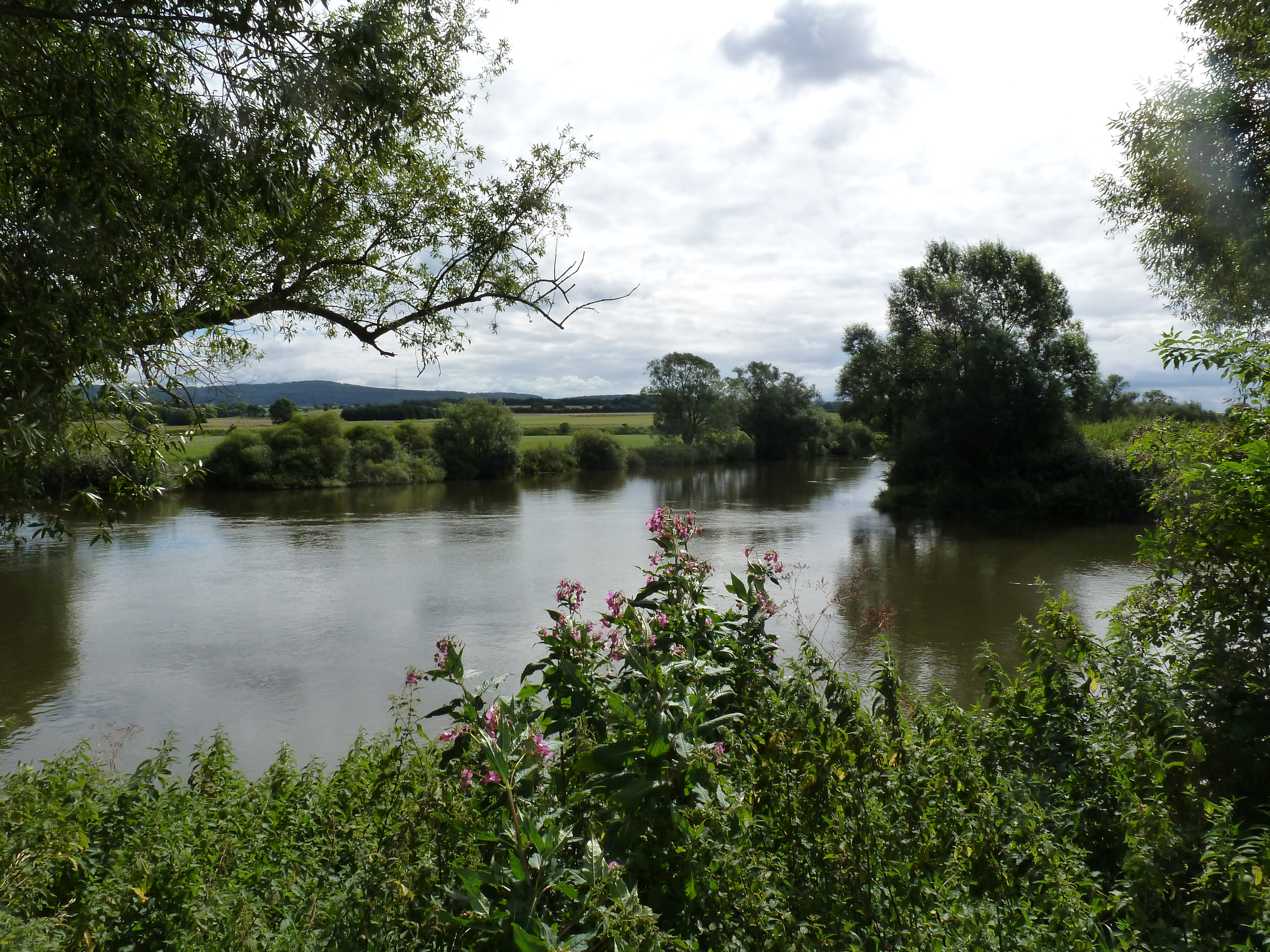
The Eder (right) converges near Grifte into the Fulda (from back right to left)

The most important tributaries of the Eder are (listed first in Eder-kilometres from source to the Fulda):

Name	orographic order	length (km)	Drainage basin (km^{2})	discharge (discharge rate; l/s)	mouth (Eder-kilometres)	mouth elevation (m ü. NHN)	German river numbering system
Wähbach	right	6.0	6.717		6.9	514	428–112
Benfe	right	11.2	19.446		11.9	479	428–114
Elberndorfer Bach	left	9.0	10.733		13.6	470	428–118
Röspe	left	8.6	37.013		17.7	450	428–12
Kappel	left	7.3	27.443		21.8	431	428–132
Preisdorf	right	6.0	8.506		14.2	425	428–1334
Trüfte	left	9.7	16.576		27.1	413	428–134
Altmühlbach	right	5.3	14.459		27.9	410	428–136
Rinther Bach	right	6.1	9.12		30.3	406	428–138
Odeborn	left	21.2	85.064		31.3	403	428–14
Grundbach	rechts	5.1	7.507		33.1	399	428–152
Lützelsbach	left	5.6	6.437		34.8	395	428–154
Leisebach	right	4.6	12.375		38.7	380	428–156
Arfe	left	5.4	5.401		39.6	377	428–158
Lindenhöferbach	right	4.1	12.034	189.8	48.9	349	428–1596
Elsoff	left	19.0	48.925	948.1	50.0	345	428–16
Eifaer Bach	right	4.5	7.211	103.3	54.2	342	428–172
Riedgraben	left	7.6	11.319	173.4	69.0	305	428–174
Elbrighäuser Bach	left	10.8	17.768	321.3	70.5	301	428–176
Nitzelbach	left	10.6	8.397	132.4	73.7	295	428–178
Linspherbach	left	18.3	33.107	565.8	77.0	286	428–18
Hainerbach	left	7.3	10.132	103.7	80.4	280	428–192
Goldbach	left	9.5	13.838	155.8	84.5	273	428–1952
Nemphe	right	14.2	38.383	293.5	86.9	270	428–198
Nuhne	left	36.9	156.747	2661.6	89.3	267	428–2
Lengelbach	right	11.4	25.848	209.9	96.3	255	428–32
Orke	left	38.2	278.867	3844.5	97.5	254	428–4
Lorfe	right	11.8	24.281	245.7	101.4	250	428–512
Itter*	left	11.6	76.131	771.3	105.8	247	428–531
Aselbach*	left	6.6	18.103	135.4	112.4	246	428–533
Banferbach*	right	7.2	16.383	213.9	115.2	245	428–535
Werbe*	left	13.2	42.263	322.6	122.2	245	428–537
Reiherbach*	left	7.4	27.322	188.9	122.3	245	428–538
Netze	left	12.9	29.04	169.5	134.0	194	428–554
Wesebach	right	25.3	63.433	618.2	135.7	191	428–56
Wilde	right	17.1	51.868	471.4	140.6	183	428–58
Elbe	left	33.7	123.47	731.3	146.2	174	428–6
Schwalm	right	97.1	1298.783	9044.5	159.5	158	428–8
Ems	left	34.1	146.214	753.3	164.9	151	428–92
Pilgerbach	left	8.8	25.593	102.2	175.5	145	428–98

- rivers that used to flow to the Eder, but now flow in to the Edersee lake.
