= Edersee =

Reservoir in Hesse, Germany

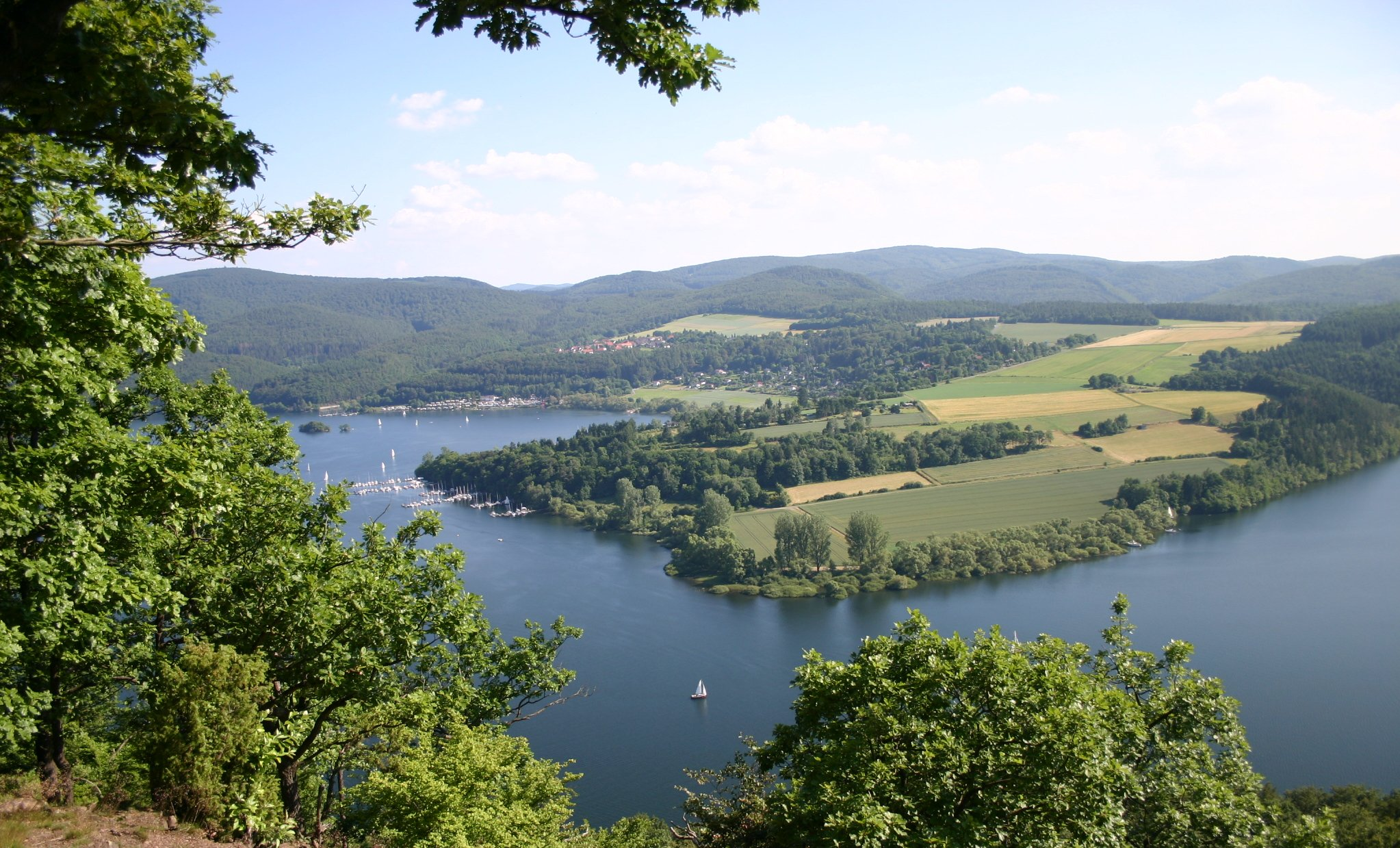
- An aerial view of the Edersee

- Location within Hesse
- Location: West Hesse Depression, Hesse
- Coordinates: 51.19337°N 9.037851°E
- Catchment area: 1,443 km^{2} (557 sq mi)
- Basin countries: Germany
- Max. length: 28.5 km (17.7 mi)
- Max. width: 1.2 km (0.75 mi)
- Surface area: 11.8 km^{2} (4.6 sq mi)
- Max. depth: 41.7 m (137 ft)
- Water volume: 199,300,000 m^{3} (7.04×10^{9} cu ft)
- Surface elevation: 244.97 m (803.7 ft)
- Settlements: Waldeck

The Edersee (German pronunciation: [ˈeːdɐzeː]), also known as the Ederstausee, is an 11.8 km^{2} (4.6 sq mi) reservoir in Waldeck-Frankenberg, Hesse, Germany holding back an estimated 199.3 million m^{3} (7.04 billion cu ft). It has the second-largest area (behind the Forggensee), and the third-largest volume (behind the Bleilochstausee and Rurstausee), of all reservoirs in Germany. It is on the chief western tributary of the Fulda, the Eder, behind the 48 m-high (157 ft) Edersee Dam near the town of Waldeck in the Waldeck-Frankenberg district of North Hesse.

The dam and reservoir are owned by the Federal Waterways and Shipping Administration, whose Hann. Münden Waterways and Shipping office is locally responsible. The primary purpose is provision of water for the federal waterways, the Oberweser and Mittellandkanal. The dam also protects downstream residents from small and medium floods, generates electrical energy and the lake is used for sports and leisure.

== Setting ==
Being in the Naturpark Kellerwald-Edersee and the Nationalpark Kellerwald-Edersee and overlooked by Waldeck Castle, it and its surroundings constitute a large recreational/touristic area, economically as well as a reserve for mature trees, woodland flowers, fungi and lichens, wildflowers, animals such as deer, foxes, badgers and occasionally the Eurasian wolf.

This fairly brief central portion of the Eder has its dam near Hemfurth-Edersee, about 35 km (22 mi) south-west of Kassel, linked by a winding road. The lake stretches from the joining of a tributary, short of Herzhausen, in the west to the dam aforesaid. Beyond an intermittent band of tree-lined fields to the south associated with two shoreside villages is the "Ederhöhen", very high, often steep, wooded foothills to the Kellerwald mountain range. Together they form a protected upland forest roughly congruent with the Nationalpark Kellerwald-Edersee.

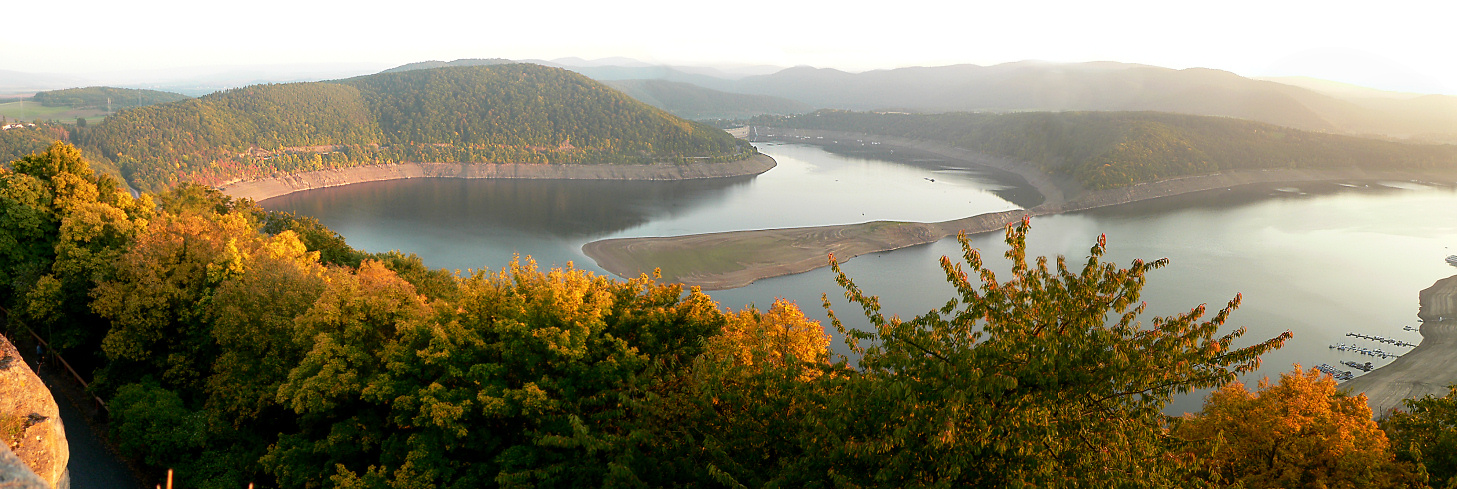
The Edersee in a dry hazy early autumn when it had low water

This is the largest lake in Hesse. It takes in four bends, sharp meanders, to its south side.

== 2025 European heatwaves ==
The Edersee is important for tourism and water sports in the North Hessian holiday region. At the same time, it also serves shipping on the Weser. This is because it is used to regulate the Weser and the Mittelland Canal. The dam supplies federal waterways so that they remain navigable. It can store around 200 million m³ of water. Around 10 August 2025, the water level was around 38 million m³ (19.1 %). In July 2025, 7.5 million m³ flew in; the long-term average has been about 23 million m³.

The Regionalverband Eder-Diemel e.V. (RVED) has called for a change in water management in view of the tense situation, also in light of the ongoing global warming. Lake Edersee is too small to compensate missing rainfalls and high temperatures.

== See also ==
- Edersee Dam
