= Waldeck, Hesse =

Waldeck
- Town
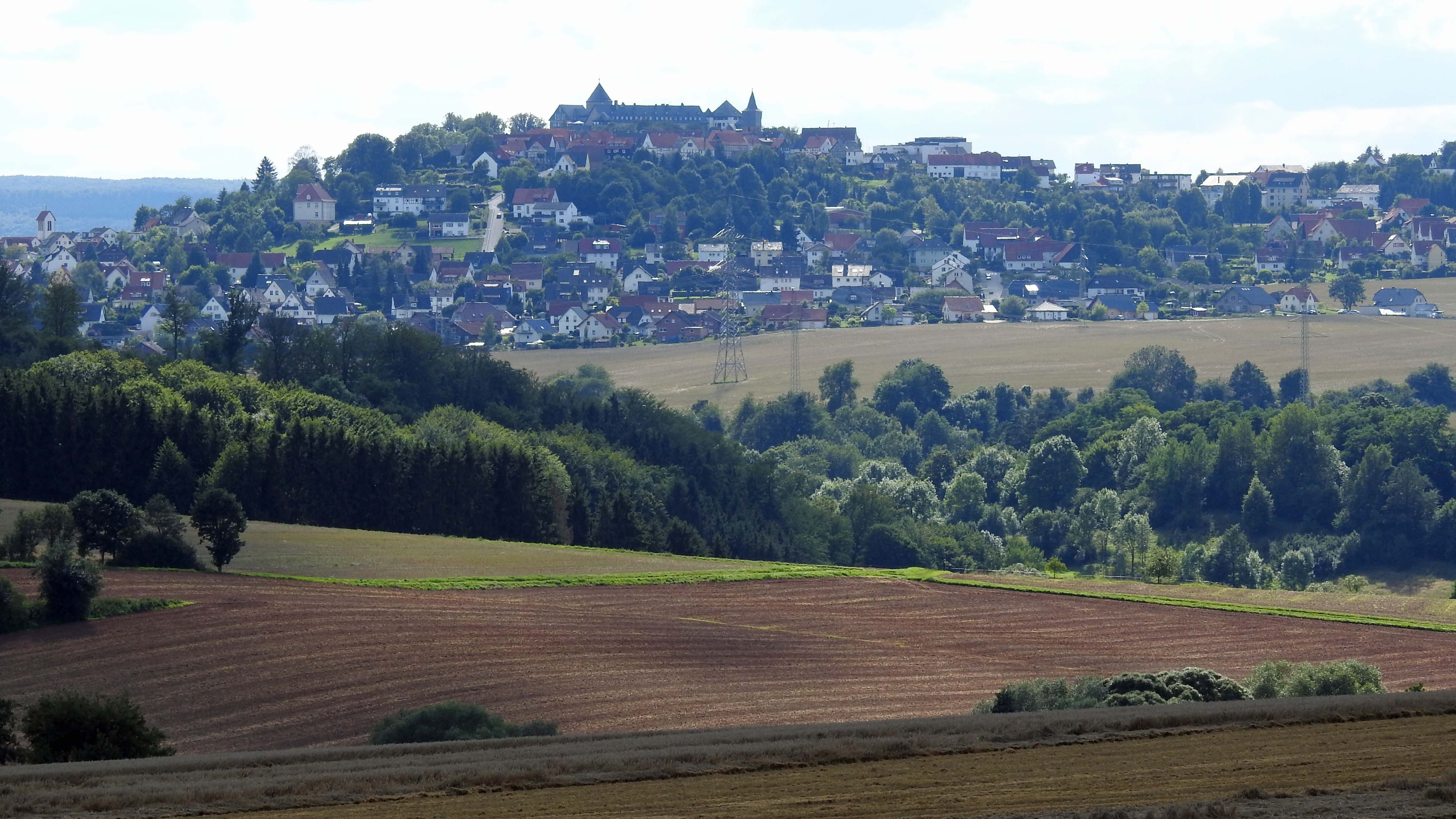
- Waldeck seen from the northeast

- Coat of arms

- Location of Waldeck within Waldeck-Frankenberg district
- Interactive map of Waldeck
- Location within Germany Location within Hesse
- Coordinates: 51°12′N 09°4′E
- Country: Germany
- State: Hesse
- Admin. region: Kassel
- District: Waldeck-Frankenberg
- Subdivisions: 10 Stadtteile

Government
  - Mayor (2018–24): Jürgen Vollbracht (CDU)

Area
  - Total: 115.7 km^{2} (44.7 sq mi)
- Elevation: 245–475 m (804–1,558 ft)

Population (2025-12-31)
  - Total: 6,882
  - Density: 59.48/km^{2} (154.1/sq mi)
- Time zone: UTC+01:00 (CET)
  - Summer (DST): UTC+02:00 (CEST)
- Postal codes: 34513
- Dialling codes: 05634
- Vehicle registration: KB
- Website: www.waldeck.de

Waldeck (German pronunciation: [ˈvaldɛk]) is a small town in Waldeck-Frankenberg district in northwestern Hesse, Germany. Its located near the Edersee, which is a popular destination for tourists and locals alike.

== Geography ==
=== Location ===
Waldeck lies on the Edersee, a man-made lake. Waldeck's constituent municipalities stretch from the shore of the Edersee into the Kellerwald.

=== Neighbouring municipalities ===
Waldeck borders in the north on the municipality of Twistetal, in the northeast on the town of Bad Arolsen (both in Waldeck-Frankenberg), in the east on the towns of Wolfhagen and Naumburg (both in the district of Kassel), in the south on the municipality of Edertal, and in the west on the municipality of Vöhl and the town of Korbach (all three in Waldeck-Frankenberg).

=== Constituent municipalities ===
The town of Waldeck consists of the centres of Alraft, Dehringhausen, Freienhagen, Höringhausen, Netze, Nieder-Werbe, Ober-Werbe, Sachsenhausen, Selbach and Waldeck.

== History ==
The first evidence of settlement at Waldeck comes from the year 1232 when a document from the Netze Monastery mentioned the universitas civitatis de waldeke. Until 1254, the town was also called Rode, possibly because there was a clearing there. The town's first seal was acquired in 1266, and the town had its first historically verifiable mayor in 1311. Until the beginning of the 20th century, Waldeck's population barely exceeded 400.

Waldeck was the residence of the Counts of Waldeck who, beginning around 1200, gradually gathered a sizeable realm under their control and, having added the county of Pyrmont to their holdings through inheritance, were elevated to Princes of Waldeck-Pyrmont in 1712. In 1655, the residence was transferred to Arolsen, and Waldeck lost its importance.

The Edersee, Germany's third largest reservoir, was created by the construction of the Eder dam in 1914. The dam, designed to help regulate water levels for shipping on the Weser and to generate hydroelectricity, was destroyed by the RAF on 17 May 1943 (see Operation Chastise), causing massive flooding and loss of life downstream, but was rebuilt.

=== Freienhagen ===
Until municipal reforms in 1974, Freienhagen was a town in its own right. It already had town rights when history first mentioned the town in 1253; it is believed that they were granted in 1231. On the Hünenburg, a 472 m-high mountain in the Freienhagen Municipal Forest, traces of a prehistoric settlement have been found.

In the Middle Ages, Freienhagen had a complete ring of walls with two town gates through which led the old trade road from Cologne to Leipzig. Likewise historically interesting is the Freienhagen Free Court (Freienhagener Freigericht), which sat at first at the Schiebenscheid and later under the linden tree at the Steinborn. Under the Free Counts (Freigrafen – chairmen of the court) Sigmund Manegold (1435–1455) and Johann Manhoff (1438–1458), the court reached its greatest importance: the Teutonic Knights, and the cities of Frankfurt and Cologne, were referred to Freienhagen.

=== Amalgamations ===
As part of municipal reforms, the greater town of Waldeck was formed out of the formerly independent municipalities of Alraft, Höringhausen, Netze, Nieder-Werbe, Selbach, Sachsenhausen and Waldeck. In 1974, Dehringhausen, Freienhagen and Ober-Werbe also joined the town.

== Politics ==
=== Town council ===
The town council's 31 seats are apportioned thus, in accordance with municipal elections held on 6 March 2016:

SPD	8 seats
CDU	10 seats
FWG	6 seats
FDP	3 seats
Greens	4 seat

Note: FWG is a citizens' coalition.

The town's executive consists of 7 councillors. Three of these seats are held by the SPD, 2 by the CDU, and one seat each by the FWG and the FDP.

Mayoral elections are held every six years. The most recent mayors were:

- 2018–incumbent: Jürgen Vollbracht (CDU)
- 2006–2018: Jörg Feldmann (independent)
- 1994–2006: Peter Brandenburg (SPD)

=== Coat of arms ===
The official blazon roughly translates thus: In Or a six-pointed star sable.

This simply describes a black six-pointed star on a gold background, with no mention at all of the fleur-de-lys. Furthermore, Waldeck's official Internet presence does not contain any text about the civic coat of arms, although it does display the version with the lily. At least one source, however, shows arms for Waldeck matching the blazon.

According to this same source, the star was originally eight-pointed, as commonly appears in many civic arms in the Waldeck region. It is an heraldic charge once borne by the Counts of Waldeck in the Middle Ages. The number of points was changed in the 19th century to distinguish the town's arms from the district's.

=== Town partnerships ===
- (Germany) Blankenhain, Thuringia, since 1990

== Culture and sightseeing ==
=== Museums ===
- Heimatmuseum Höringhausen (local history)
- Dorfstube Nieder-Werbe

=== Buildings ===
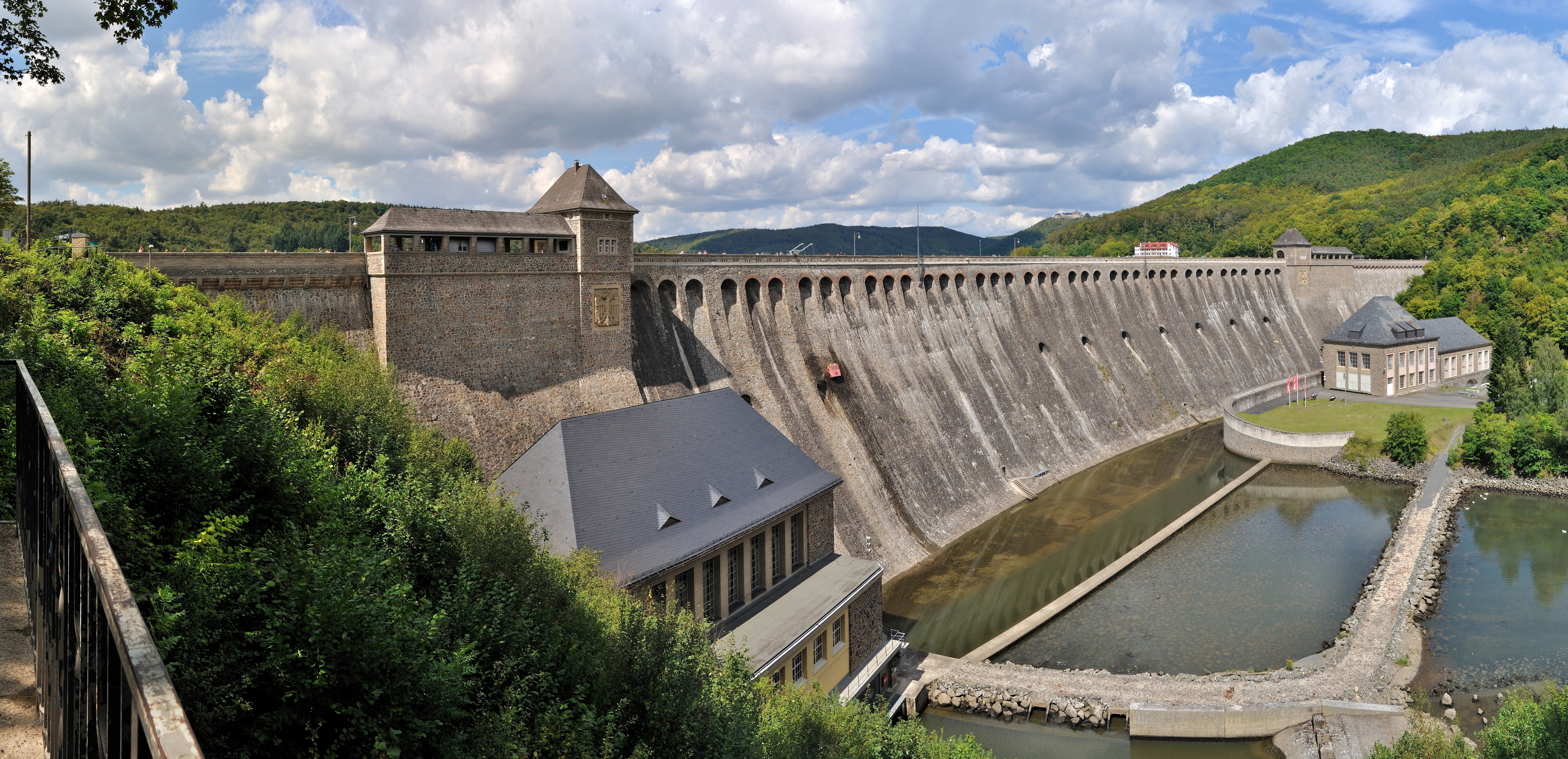
Edersee Dam (Edertalsperre)

- Schloss Waldeck, stately home, and the town's landmark
- Netze monastery church with an altar from the 14th century
- Sachsenhäuser Warte (watchtower in Sachsenhausen)
- Edertalsperre (dam)
- Romanesque "fortress church" with onion domes in Freienhagen
- half-timbered houses in Freienhagen
- Old mills near Freienhagen

=== Parks ===
- Uferpromenade Waldeck (shoreline promenade)

=== Sport ===
- Golf courses north of town: 18-hole championship course and 9-hole short course

== Economy and infrastructure ==
=== Transport ===
Through the town run the Federal Highways (Bundesstraßen) B 251 and B 485.

Operations on the stretch of the Ederseebahn railway line between Bad Wildungen and Korbach, on which lies Waldeck, ceased on 27 May 1995.

There is a cableway to the Edersee and well built hiking trails in the Kellerwald-Edersee National Park.
