= Fulda (river) =

River in Germany

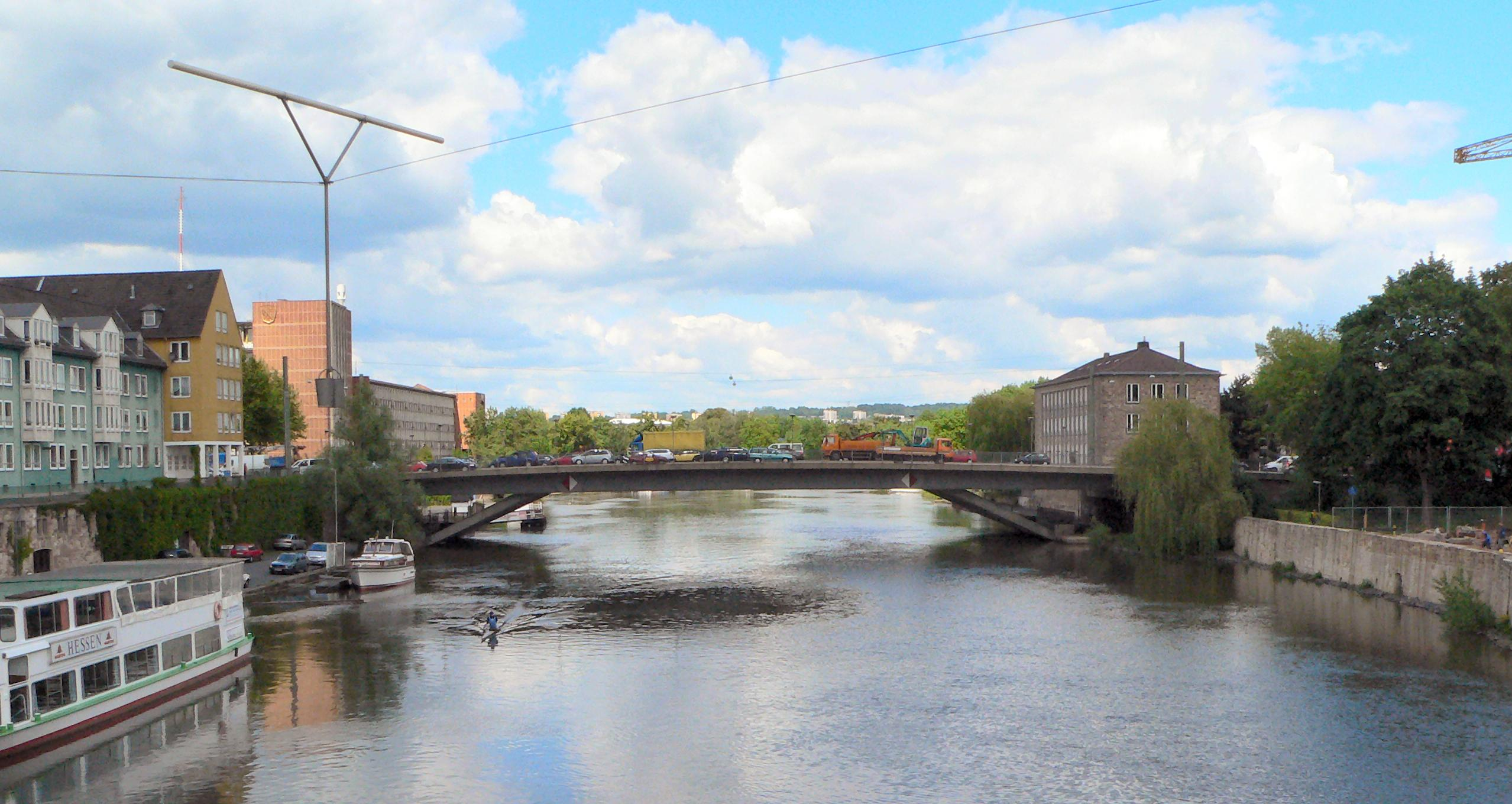
- The Fulda in Kassel

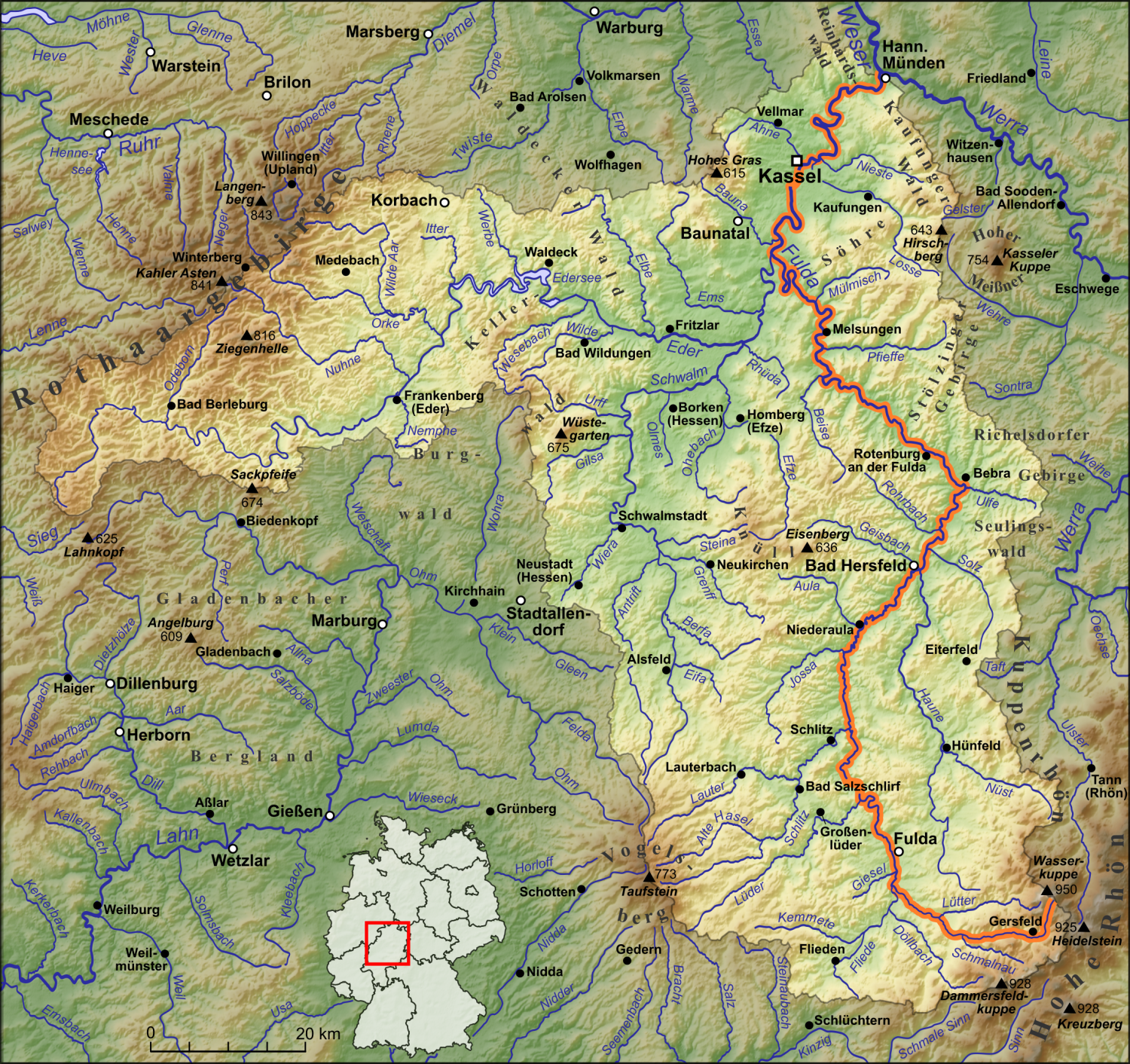
- Course of the Fulda shown in red

Location
- Country: Germany
- States: Hesse and Lower Saxony

Physical characteristics
- Source
  - location: Rhön
  - coordinates: 50°29′40″N 9°56′42″E
  - elevation: 850 m (2,790 ft)
- Mouth
  - location: Weser
  - coordinates: 51°25′16″N 9°38′54″E
- Length: 220.4 km (137.0 mi)
- Basin size: 6,947 km^{2} (2,682 sq mi)

Basin features
- Progression: Weser→ North Sea
- Tributaries
  - left: Schlitz, Eder
  - right: Haune, Losse

The Fulda (German pronunciation: [ˈfʊlda]) is a river of Hesse and Lower Saxony, Germany. It is one of two headstreams of the Weser (the other one being the Werra). The Fulda is 220.4 kilometres (137.0 mi) long.

The river arises at Wasserkuppe in the Rhön mountains in Hesse. From there it runs northeast, flanked by the Knüll mountains in the west and the Seulingswald in the east. Near Bebra it changes direction to the northwest.

After joining the Eder river it flows straight north until Kassel, then changes direction to the northeast, with the Kaufungen Forest to the east and the beginning of the Reinhardswald forest to the northwest. The north end of the river meets the Werra in Hannoversch Münden, Lower Saxony, where the Fulda and the Werra join to form the Weser river.

Cities along the Fulda include:

- Gersfeld
- Fulda
- Bad Hersfeld
- Bebra
- Rotenburg an der Fulda
- Melsungen
- Kassel

== See also ==
- List of rivers of Hesse
- List of rivers of Lower Saxony
