= Vogelsberg (disambiguation) =

The Vogelsberg is a major mountain region in central Germany.

Vogelsberg may also refer to:

- Vogelsberg (Feldatal), a hill in the Vogelsberg range
- Vogelsberg, Thuringia, a small village in Thuringia, Germany
- Vogelsbergkreis, a county in Hesse, Germany
- 10952 Vogelsberg, a minor planet

== See also ==
- Fogelberg
- Vogelberg
