= Schrecksbach =

- Municipality
- Coat of arms

- Location of Schrecksbach within Schwalm-Eder-Kreis district
- Interactive map of Schrecksbach
- Location within Germany Location within Hesse
- Coordinates: 50°50′N 9°17′E
- Country: Germany
- State: Hesse
- Admin. region: Kassel
- District: Schwalm-Eder-Kreis

Government
  - Mayor (2023–29): Daniel Helwig (SPD)

Area
  - Total: 36.61 km^{2} (14.14 sq mi)
- Elevation: 280 m (920 ft)

Population (2025-12-31)
  - Total: 2,921
  - Density: 79.79/km^{2} (206.6/sq mi)
- Time zone: UTC+01:00 (CET)
  - Summer (DST): UTC+02:00 (CEST)
- Postal codes: 34637
- Dialling codes: 06698
- Vehicle registration: HR
- Website: www.schrecksbach.de

Schrecksbach is a municipality in the Schwalm-Eder district in Hesse State, Germany.

== Geography ==
=== Location ===
Schrecksbach lies in the southern part of Schwalm-Eder on the River Schwalm, and forms the border with the Vogelsbergkreis.

=== Constituent communities ===
The following centres belong to the greater community:

- Hof Röllhausen
- Holzburg
- Röllshausen
- Salmshausen
- Schönberg
- Schrecksbach
- Trockenbach

== History ==
Schrecksbach is a very old place that was mentioned in one of Charlemagne's documents as "Screggesbaha am Sualmanahafluß" as early as 782.

The community itself was first mentioned in 1223.

On 31 October 1806, Napoleon's army overran the country. Elector William I fled and was unseated. At this time, Schrecksbach was occupied by enemy (ie French) troops, suffering heavily as a result.

== Politics ==
=== Municipal council ===
Municipal council is made up of 23 members.

- CDU 4 seats
- SPD 11 seats
- UWG (citizens' coalition) 5 seats
- FWG (citizens' coalition) 3 seats

(as of municipal elections held on 26 March 2006)

== Economy and infrastructure ==
=== Transport ===
The community is connected to the buslines through the railway stations at Schwalmstadt-Treysa and Alsfeld.
