= Schwalmtal =

Schwalmtal can refer to two municipalities in Germany:

- Schwalmtal, North Rhine-Westphalia, in the district of Viersen, North Rhine-Westphalia
- Schwalmtal, Hesse, in Vogelsbergkreis, Hesse
