= Mücke =

- Municipality
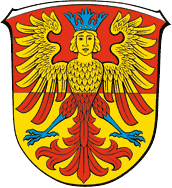
- Coat of arms

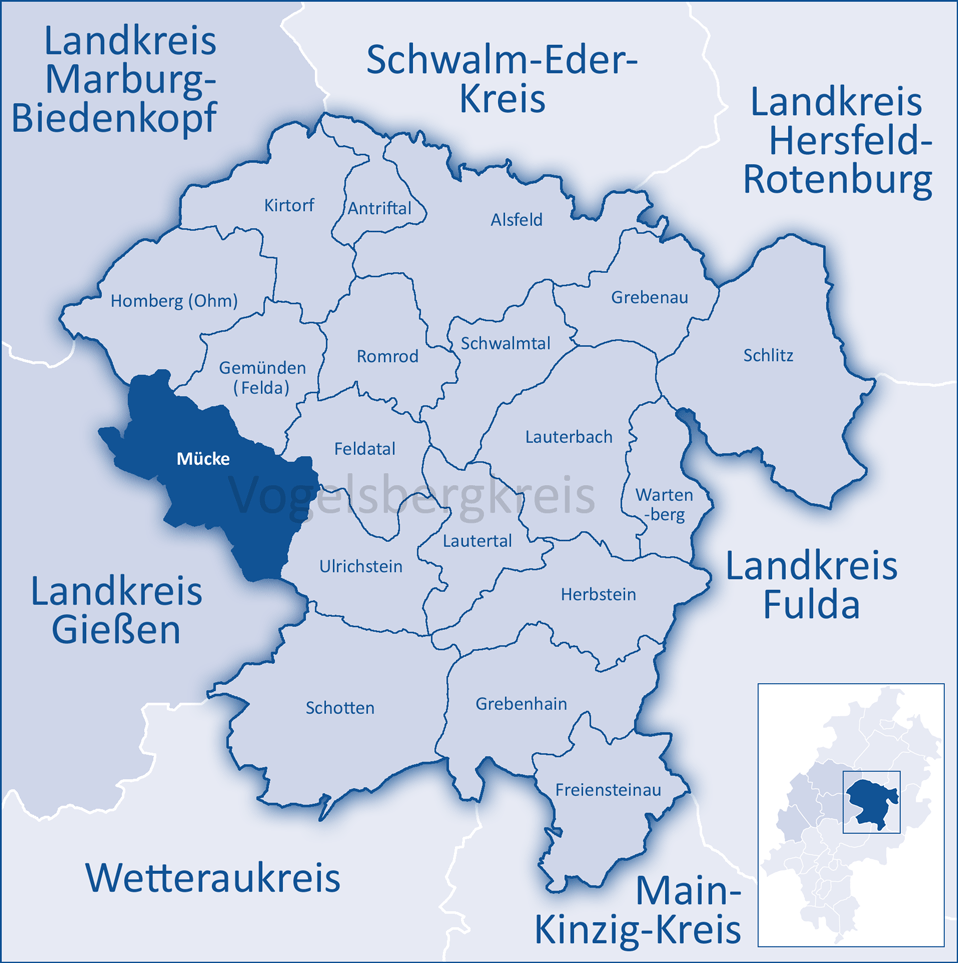
- Location of Mücke within Vogelsbergkreis district
- Interactive map of Mücke
- Location within Germany Location within Hesse
- Coordinates: 50°37′N 09°02′E
- Country: Germany
- State: Hesse
- Admin. region: Gießen
- District: Vogelsbergkreis

Government
  - Mayor (2023–29): Andreas Sommer

Area
  - Total: 86.23 km^{2} (33.29 sq mi)
- Elevation: 280 m (920 ft)

Population (2025-12-31)
  - Total: 9,182
  - Density: 106.5/km^{2} (275.8/sq mi)
- Time zone: UTC+01:00 (CET)
  - Summer (DST): UTC+02:00 (CEST)
- Postal codes: 35325
- Dialling codes: 06400
- Vehicle registration: VB
- Website: www.gemeinde-muecke.de

Mücke (German pronunciation: [ˈmʏkə]) is a municipality in the Vogelsbergkreis in Hesse, Germany.

== Geography ==
=== Location ===
Mücke lies from 200 to 350 m above sea level in the northwest foothills of the Vogelsberg Mountains on the upper reaches of the river Ohm, a tributary to the Lahn

=== Neighbouring municipalities ===
Mücke borders in the north on the town of Homberg, in the northeast on the municipality of Gemünden, in the east on the municipality of Feldatal and the town of Ulrichstein, in the south on the town of Laubach (Gießen district), and in the west on the town of Ulrichstein and the municipality of Grünberg (Gießen district).

=== Constituent municipalities ===
The municipality came into being, like many other municipalities through Hesse's municipal reforms, with the amalgamation of twelve formerly independent municipalities. These are listed here:

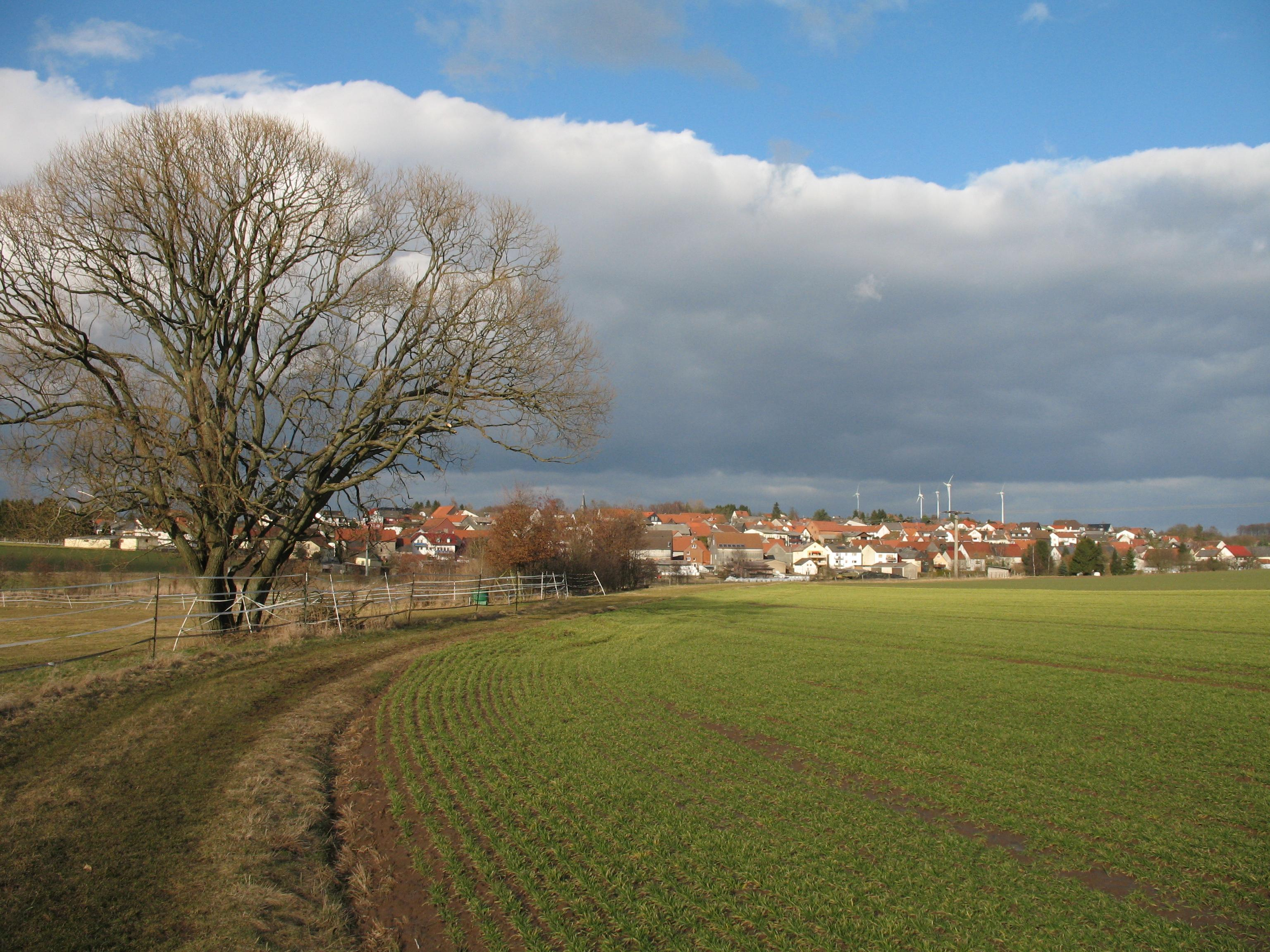
Atzenhain

- Atzenhain
- Bernsfeld
- Flensungen
- Groß-Eichen
- Höckersdorf
- Ilsdorf
- Merlau (including Kirschgarten)
- Nieder-Ohmen (including Windhain)
- Ober-Ohmen
- Ruppertenrod
- Sellnrod (including Schmitten)
- Wettsaasen

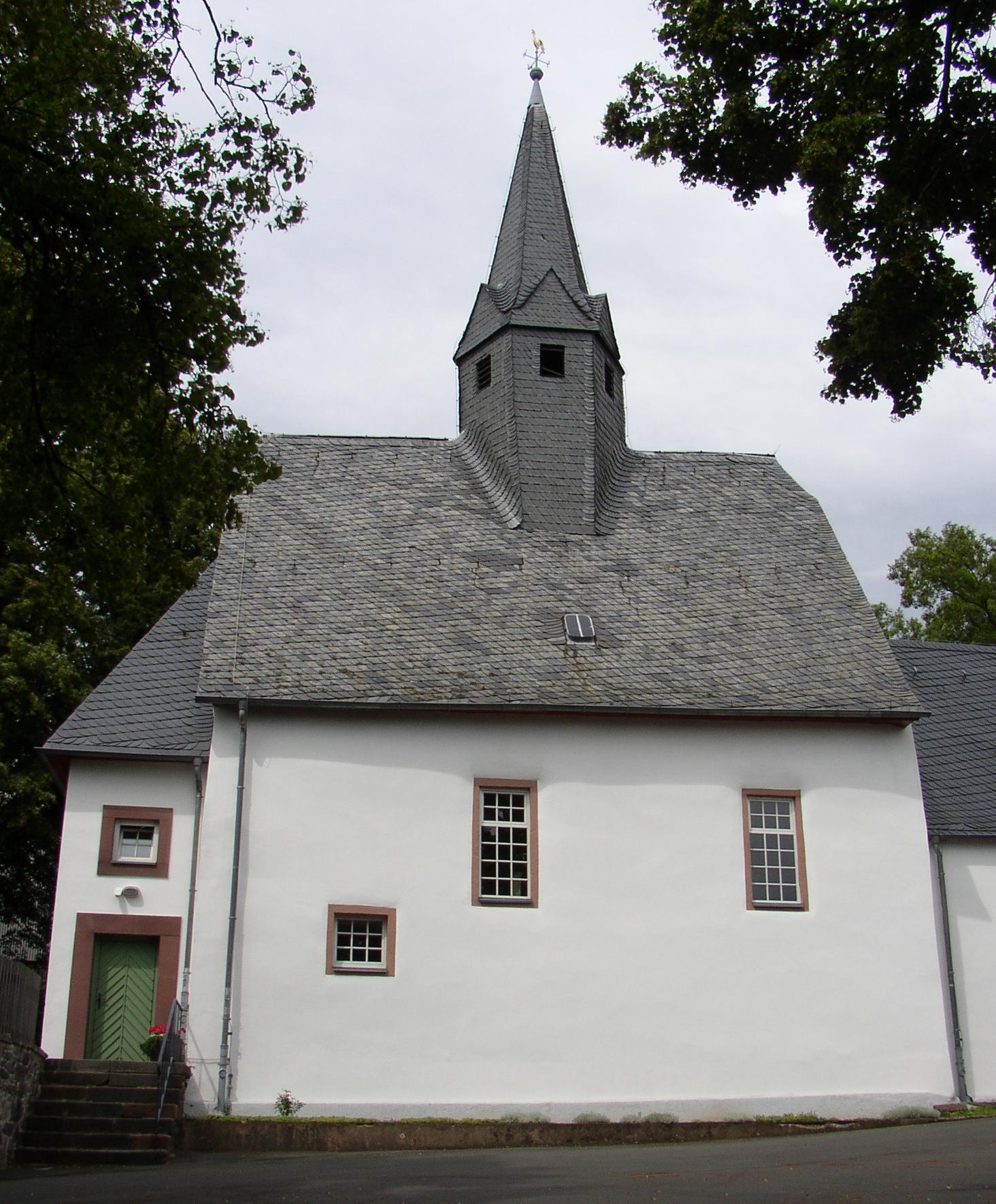
Church in Atzenhain

Among these, Nieder-Ohmen with its 2,800 inhabitants is by far the biggest. The centre of Ilsdorf bears a certain peculiarity. Until the municipal reforms, one part of Ilsdorf lay in the old district of Alsfeld, whereas the other parts were called Solms-Ilsdorf and lay in the Gießen district. This owed itself to the village's history. Ilsdorf had formerly been a part of the Province of Upper Hesse in the Landgraviate of Hesse-Darmstadt, while Solms-Ilsdorf was ruled by the Counts of Solms. Even today, this former split can still be seen in Ilsdorf, as the village has two cemeteries at its disposal.

Before the municipal reforms, there was no place with the name "Mücke", but there was a Mücke railway station on the Gießen-Fulda line (the Vogelsbergbahn) and a postal designation "Mücke".

Despite what may seem obvious – Mücke is German for "gnat" – the municipality's name is of Celtic origin. It comes from much or mack, meaning something like "moist","boggy" or "mucky". The name Mücke was mentioned in connection with this region in a Merlau parish taxation roll in 1482.

In the constituent municipality of Flensungen lies Hesse's geographical centre point.

== Politics ==
=== Municipal council ===
As of municipal elections held on 26 March 2006 the seats are apportioned thus:

- SPD 15 seats
- CDU 11 seats
- FWG (citizens' coalition) 8 seats
- Greens 3 seats

A political peculiarity is the Jugendparlament Mücke ("Mücke Youth Parliament"), which stands up for children's and youth's interests. Its 35 members aged between 14 and 21 are elected every two years. The Jugendparlament has the right to speak and make motions on the municipal council's youth, sport and cultural committee.

=== Partnership ===
The municipality of Mücke maintains a partnership with:

- Sydfalster, Denmark, since 1993

== Personalities ==
=== People with connections to the municipality ===
- Anne Chaplet, criminal author
- Reinhard Schober, from 1945 to 1948 leader of the Nieder-Ohmen forestry office
- Harald Lesch, physicist, astronomer, natural philosopher, author, television presenter and professor at LMU Munich, grew up in Nieder-Ohmen

== Infrastructure and leisure ==
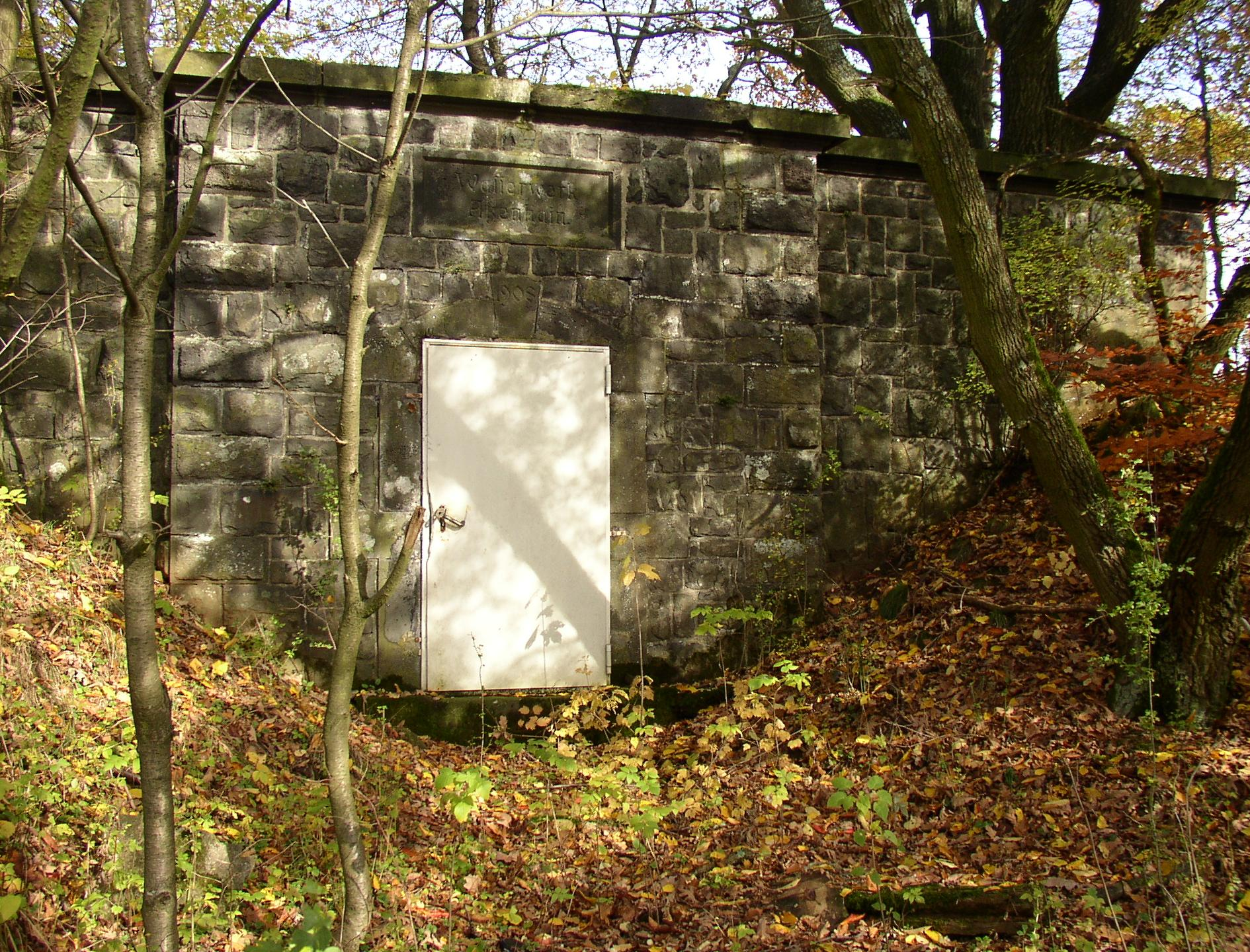
Former waterworks in Atzenhain

The municipality of Mücke has at its disposal, through the Homberg (Ohm) Autobahn interchange (A5) and Federal Highway (Bundesstraße) 49 that runs through the municipal area, very good transport connections. A few years ago, at the Autobahn interchange, the "Am Gottesrain" industrial park was established complete with an off-Autobahn service centre ("Autohof"). Mücke station and the station in the constituent municipality of Nieder-Ohmen are on the Vogelsberg Railway (Vogelsbergbahn) between Gießen and Fulda via Alsfeld.

The municipality has an indoor swimming pool with an adjoining sauna, seven kindergartens, two primary schools, and a comprehensive school without upper level in the constituent municipality of Nieder-Ohmen. Furthermore, there is a Sozialstation ( ≈ welfare station for the elderly and the sick) with trained personnel.

In all constituent municipalities are found Village municipality Houses that may be used for all kinds of events. Moreover, there are many clubs to choose from. Anyone can find something to suit his interests.

There are plenty of supermarkets and smaller shops in each constituent municipality to satisfy shopping needs.

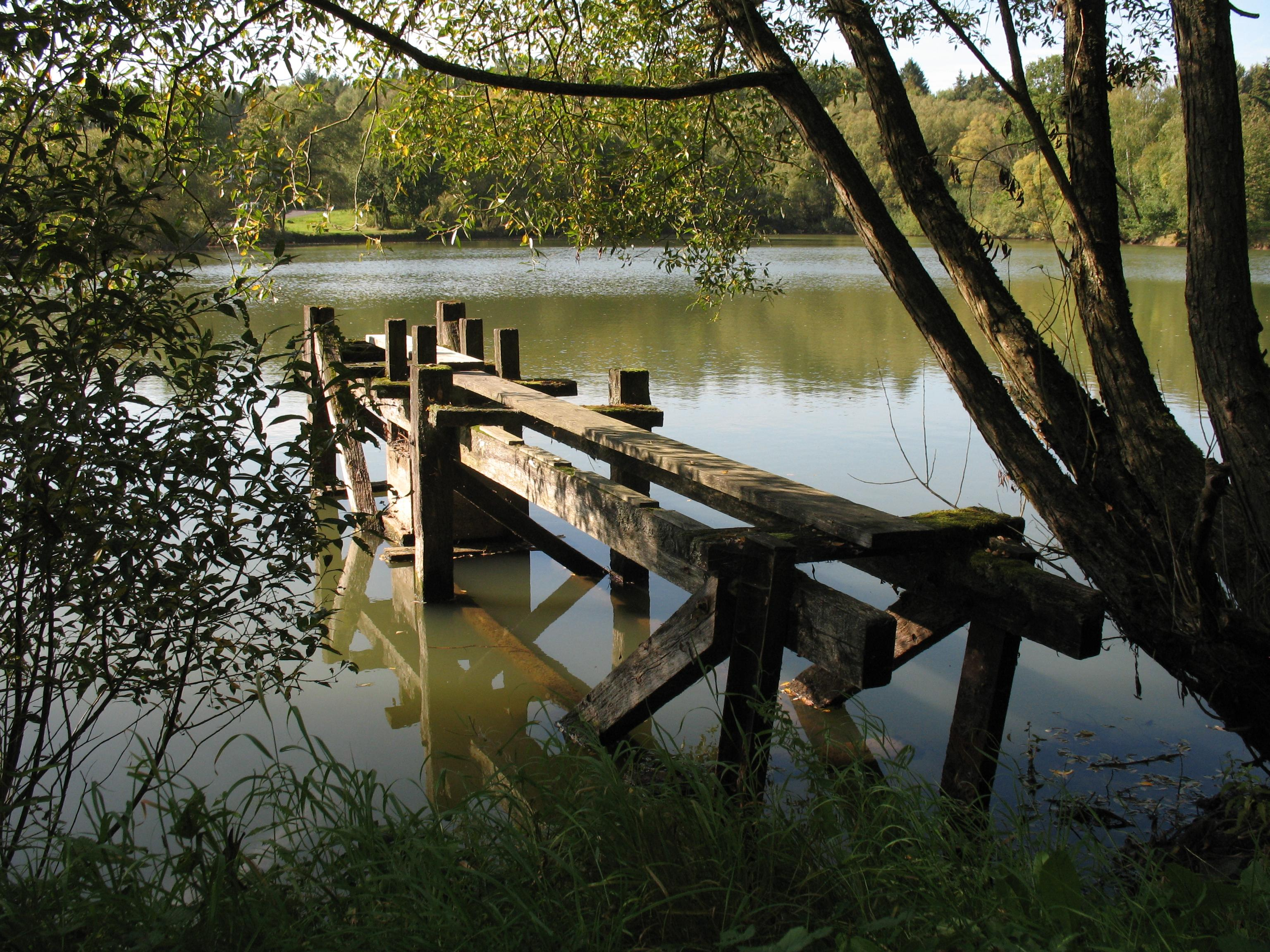
Lake in Atzenhain

Among more particular leisure facilities is the Flensunger Hof, run by a missionary body. It is a fully equipped sport and leisure centre. On the Kratzberg in the Nieder-Ohmen rural area, the Luftsportgruppe Mücke e. V. runs a model glider airfield. In Atzenhain is the Reit- und Fahrverein Mücke e. V. with riding hall and grounds.
