= Vogelsberg (Feldatal) =

Hill in Germany

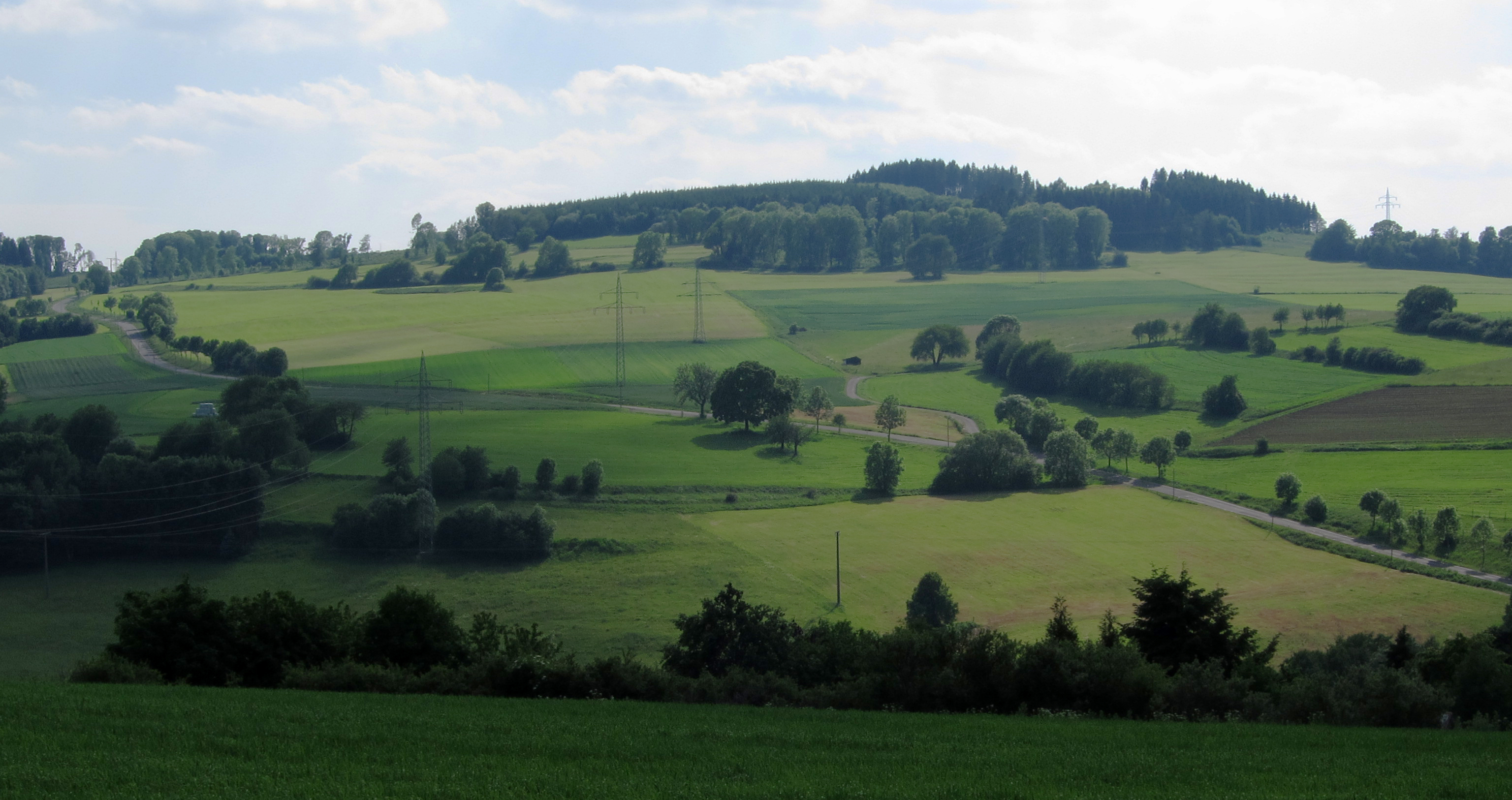
- The Vogelsberg from the east

Highest point
- Elevation: 598 m above sea level (NHN) (1,962 ft)
- Coordinates: 50°35′50″N 9°12′45″E

Geography
- Location within Hesse
- Location: Hesse, Germany
- Parent range: Vogelsberg
- Topo map: LAGIS Hessen

The Vogelsberg is a hill, 598 m above sea level (NHN), in the eponymous range of the German Central Uplands. It rises within the municipality of Feldatal in the county (Landkreis) of Vogelsbergkreis, Middle Hesse.

It is located between Köddingen to the north, Ulrichstein to the southwest and Helpershain to the northeast.

About the origin of its name there is a legend about a blacksmith who promised his soul to the devil. However, he was able to outwit the devil using a trick in which his wife disguised herself as a bird. It is unclear whether the name of the Vogelsberg mountain range is derived from this hill.
