= Romrod =

- Town
- Coat of arms

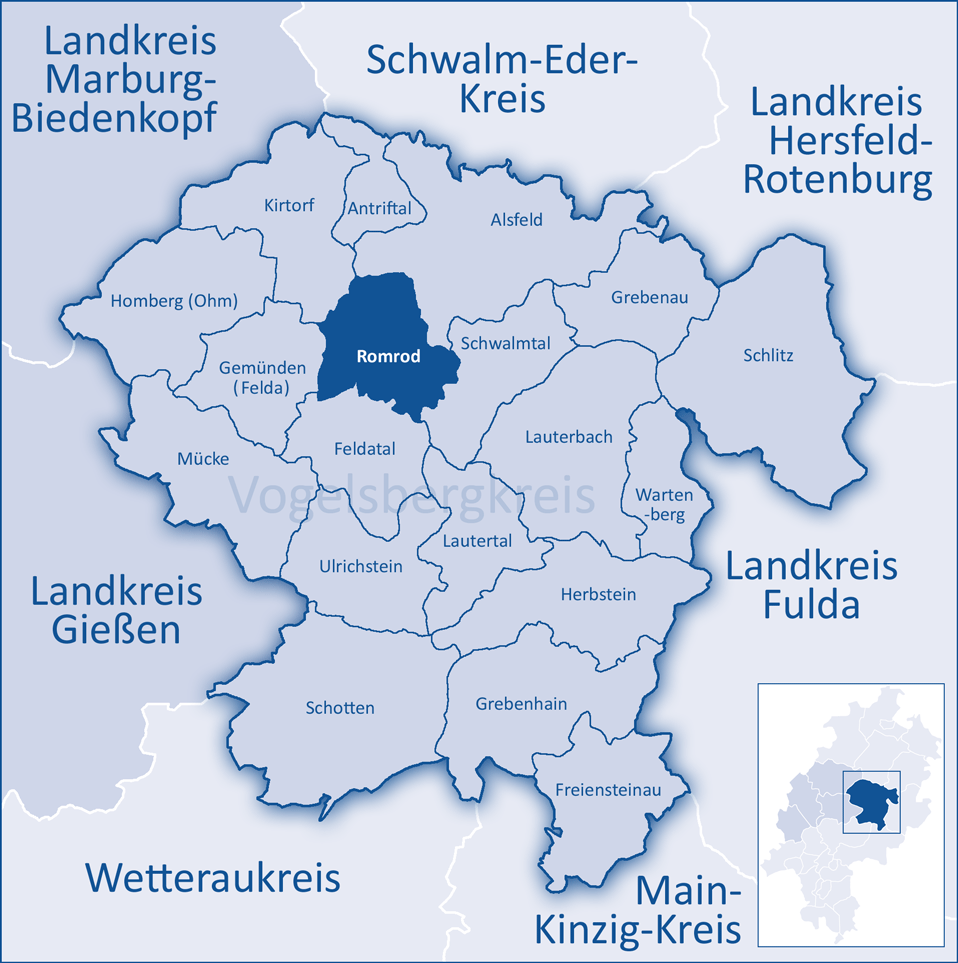
- Location of Romrod within Vogelsbergkreis district
- Interactive map of Romrod
- Location within Germany Location within Hesse
- Coordinates: 50°43′N 09°13′E
- Country: Germany
- State: Hesse
- Admin. region: Gießen
- District: Vogelsbergkreis
- Subdivisions: 5 Stadtteile

Government
  - Mayor (2021–27): Hauke Schmehl (CDU)

Area
  - Total: 54.43 km^{2} (21.02 sq mi)
- Elevation: 334 m (1,096 ft)

Population (2025-12-31)
  - Total: 2,585
  - Density: 47.49/km^{2} (123.0/sq mi)
- Time zone: UTC+01:00 (CET)
  - Summer (DST): UTC+02:00 (CEST)
- Postal codes: 36329
- Dialling codes: 06636
- Vehicle registration: VB
- Website: www.romrod.de

Romrod (German pronunciation: [ˈʁɔmʁoːt]) is a small town in the Vogelsbergkreis in central Hesse, Germany.

== Geography ==
=== Location ===
Through the town flows the river Antrift.

=== Neighbouring municipalities ===
Romrod borders in the north on the town of Alsfeld, in the east on the municipality of Schwalmtal, in the south on the municipality of Feldatal, and in the west on the municipality of Gemünden and the town of Kirtorf.

=== Constituent municipalities ===
Romrod consists of the municipalities of Nieder-Breidenbach, Ober-Breidenbach, Romrod, Strebendorf and Zell.

== History ==
The village of Rumerode developed at the crossroads of the Diotweg ("People's Way") and the Kurze Hessen army road. The first castle was built in the 11th century in the Antrift Valley. It is thus assumed that there was already a settlement there, as valley castles were often built in places where there were already people.

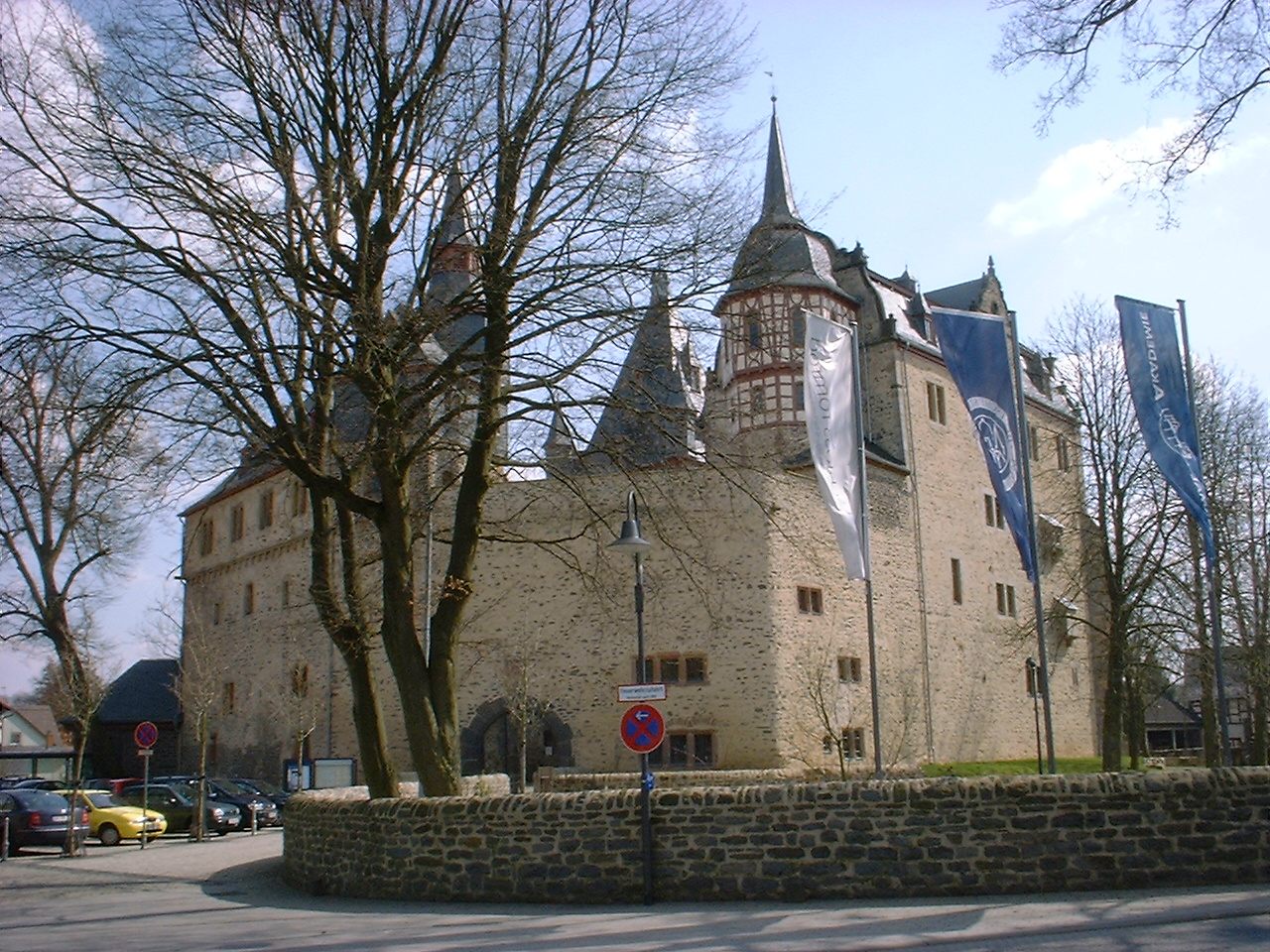
Schloss Romrod

In the first half of the 12th century, the old castle with the moat was built. The builders of this castle were presumably the local von Romrod noble family's forebears. These nobles were first mentioned in writing in 1197, when Ludwig von Romrod's name cropped up when he witnessed a document from the Fulda Abbey. In the centuries that followed, the von Romrods held important offices. Heinrich von Romrod was a Hessian marshal and Hermann von Romrod held command over the Order of St. John in Grebenau. Also worthy of noting are the Abbots Heinrich VI von Romrod (1320 - 1323/1324) in Hersfeld and Friedrich I von Romrod (1383–1395) in Fulda.

Through the course of the 14th century, the von Romrods fell on hard times and had to sell their stately home to the Landgraves Otto and Heinrich von Hessen. By 1408 at the latest, Romrod had passed to Hesse.

=== Amalgamations ===
As part of municipal reforms, the new greater municipality of Romrod came into being on 31 December 1971 with the amalgamation of the town of Romrod and the municipalities of Nieder-Breidenbach, Ober-Breidenbach, Strebendorf and Zell.

== Politics ==
Romrod town council is made up of 23 members. As of municipal elections held on 15 March 2026, the seats are apportioned thus:

SPD	: 6 seats
CDU/FWG	: 9 seats

The town executive consists of 5 councillors and the mayor.

The mayor, Hauke Schmehl was elected on 28 November 2021 with a 65.13% share of the vote.

=== Coat of arms ===
Heraldically, Romrod's civic coat of arms might be described thus: In Or a stone wall with a crenellated tower sable, below the tower and before the wall an inescutcheon, therein the Lion of Hesse (in azure a lion rampant striped nine times silver and gules, armed Or and langued gules).

The golden shield with the wall and tower has its roots in Romrod's old knightly family. The Lion of Hesse, of course, refers to Hesse, to which Romrod has belonged for centuries.

=== Town partnerships ===
- La Coquille, Dordogne, France since 1990

== Culture and sightseeing ==
=== Buildings ===
- Schloss Romrod (stately home)
- Romrod Synagogue (from 1722)

== Economy and infrastructure ==
=== Transport ===
Romrod lies on Autobahn A 5, at interchange 3, Pfefferhöhe. Furthermore, Federal Highway (Bundesstraße) B 49 runs through Romrod.

=== Public institutions ===
At the Schloss is a "memorial academy" educational centre of the Deutsche Stiftung Denkmalschutz, an initiative whose goal is to protect cultural monuments.

== Sons and daughters of the town ==
- August von Bibra (1808–1894), Manager of the Mainzer Adelsverein in Texas
- Karl Follen, German-American academic and writer
