= Lautertal (Vogelsberg) =

- Municipality
- Coat of arms

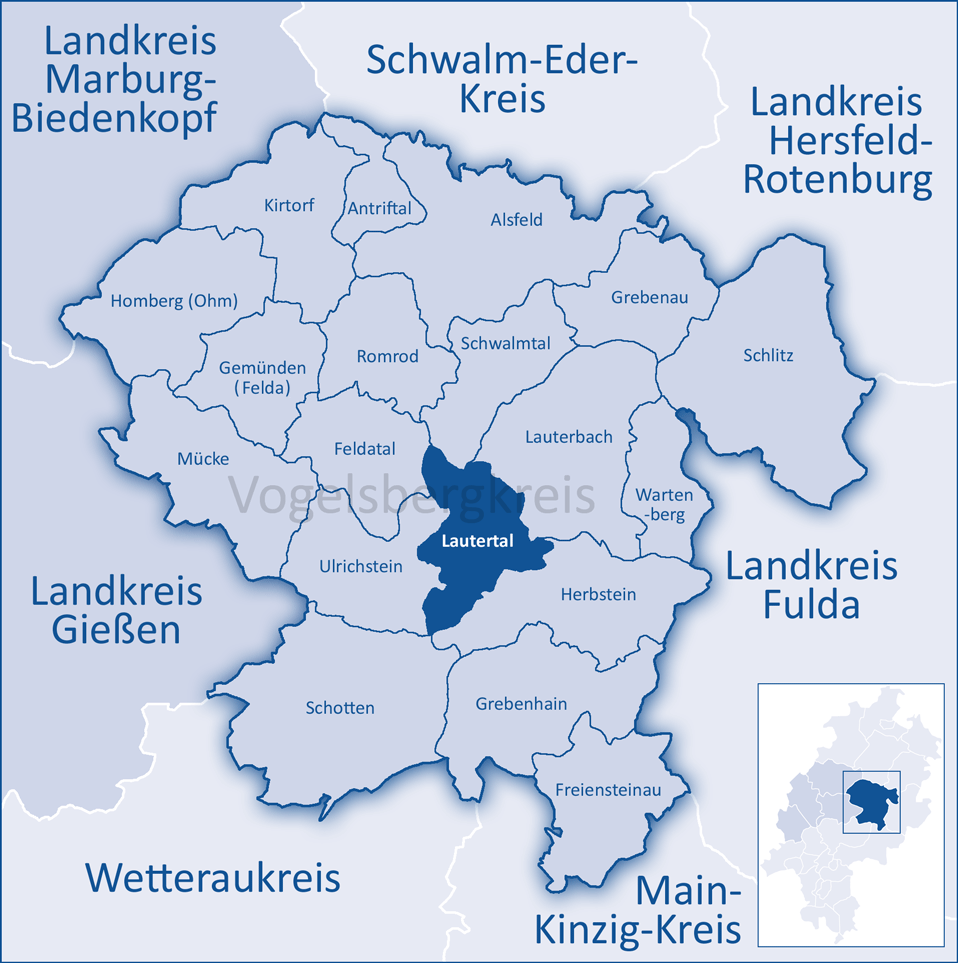
- Location of Lautertal (Vogelsberg) within Vogelsbergkreis district
- Interactive map of Lautertal (Vogelsberg)
- Location within Germany Location within Hesse
- Coordinates: 50°35′N 09°17′E
- Country: Germany
- State: Hesse
- Admin. region: Gießen
- District: Vogelsbergkreis

Government
  - Mayor (2023–29): Lukas Becker (SPD)

Area
  - Total: 53.6 km^{2} (20.7 sq mi)
- Elevation: 477 m (1,565 ft)

Population (2025-12-31)
  - Total: 2,219
  - Density: 41.4/km^{2} (107/sq mi)
- Time zone: UTC+01:00 (CET)
  - Summer (DST): UTC+02:00 (CEST)
- Postal codes: 36369
- Dialling codes: 06643, 06645 Engelrod, 06630 Meiches
- Vehicle registration: VB
- Website: www.lautertal-vogelsberg.de

Lautertal (Vogelsberg) (German pronunciation: [ˈlaʊtɐtaːl], lit. 'Lauter Valley') is a municipality in the Vogelsbergkreis in Hesse, Germany.

== Geography ==
=== Location ===
Lautertal lies from 400 to 700 m above sea level in the High Vogelsberg Nature Park (Naturpark Hoher Vogelsberg). Lautertal is famous for the spectacular natural monument Felsenmeer. It is the product of geological processes that began about 340 million years ago. At that time two continents drifted towards each other and collided in the area of today's Odenwald. At this "junction" a huge mountain range was formed. At great depth the rock melted and rose as liquid magma. About 330 million years ago it cooled in the "core" of the piled up mountains to a rock similar to granite, the melaquarz diorite.

=== Neighbouring municipalities ===
Lautertal borders in the north on the municipality of Schwalmtal, in the east on the town of Lauterbach, in the south on the town of Herbstein, and in the west on the town of Ulrichstein and the municipality of Feldatal.

=== Constituent municipalities ===
The municipality of Lautertal consists of seven centres:

- Dirlammen
- Eichelhain
- Eichenrod
- Engelrod
- Hörgenau (administrative seat)
- Hopfmannsfeld
- Meiches

== Politics ==
=== Municipal council ===
As of municipal elections held on 26 March 2006 the seats are apportioned thus:

- CDU 7 seats
- SPD 7 seats
- UBG (citizens' coalition) 1 seat
