= Fogelberg =

Fogelberg is a Swedish-language surname. Notable people with the surname include:

- Bengt Erland Fogelberg (1786–1854), Swedish sculptor
- Dan Fogelberg (1951–2007), American musician, songwriter, composer, and multi-instrumentalist
- Ola Fogelberg (1894–1952), Finnish cartoonist
- Toto Fogelberg-Kaila (1924–2013), Finnish cartoonist
- Malin Fogelberg (Andersson) (1986–), NASA's Artemis Avionics Manager at Kennedy Space Center

== See also ==
- Vogelberg
- Vogelsberg (disambiguation)
