= Feldatal =

- Municipality
- Coat of arms

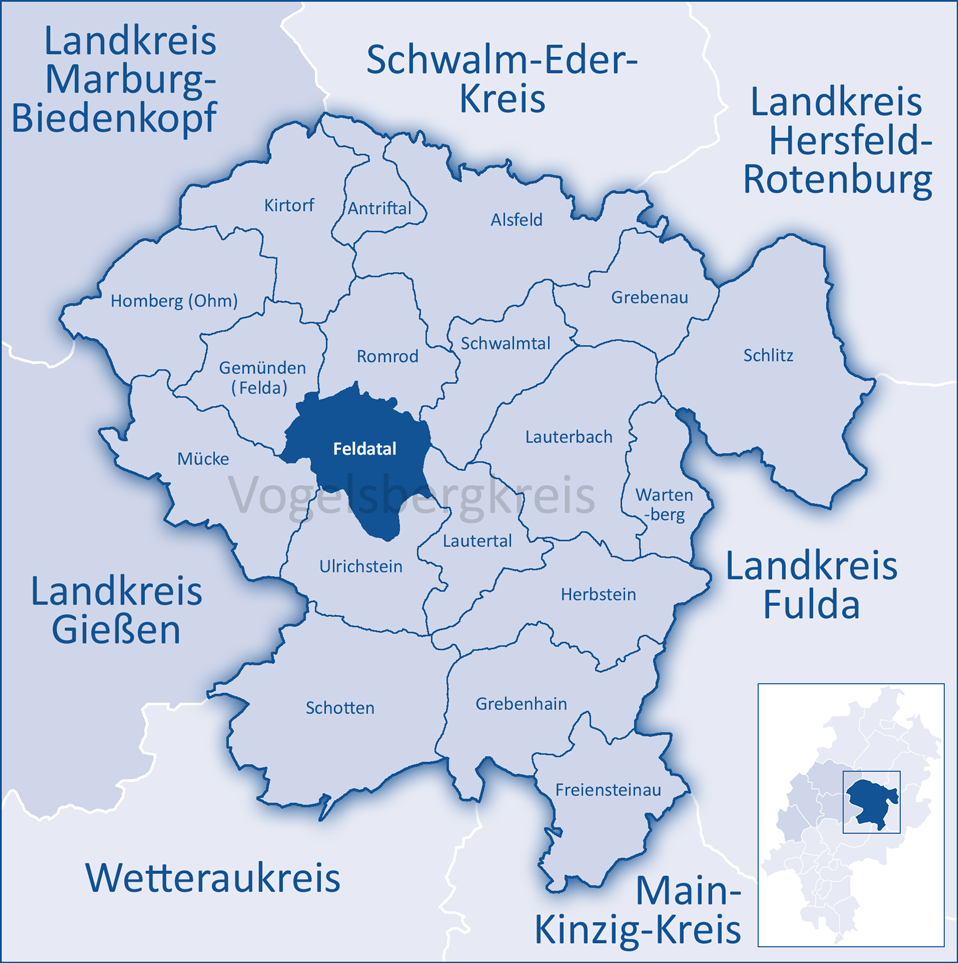
- Location of Feldatal within Vogelsbergkreis district
- Interactive map of Feldatal
- Location within Germany Location within Hesse
- Coordinates: 50°39′N 09°10′E
- Country: Germany
- State: Hesse
- Admin. region: Gießen
- District: Vogelsbergkreis
- Subdivisions: 7 Ortsteile

Government
  - Mayor (2023–29): Leopold Bach

Area
  - Total: 55.69 km^{2} (21.50 sq mi)
- Elevation: 385 m (1,263 ft)

Population (2025-12-31)
  - Total: 2,185
  - Density: 39.24/km^{2} (101.6/sq mi)
- Time zone: UTC+01:00 (CET)
  - Summer (DST): UTC+02:00 (CEST)
- Postal codes: 36325
- Dialling codes: 06637
- Vehicle registration: VB
- Website: www.feldatal.de

Feldatal (German pronunciation: [ˈfɛldataːl], lit. 'Felda Valley') is a municipality in the Vogelsbergkreis in Hesse, Germany.

== Geography ==
=== Location ===
The municipality lies 285 to 598 m above sea level on the north slope of the Vogelsberg mountains. Through the municipality flows the river Felda, which empties into the Ohm at Gemünden.

=== Neighbouring municipalities ===
Feldatal borders in the north on the town of Romrod, in the northeast on the municipality of Schwalmtal, in the east on the municipality of Lautertal, in the south on the town of Ulrichstein, in the southwest on the municipality of Mücke, and in the northwest on the municipality of Gemünden.

=== Constituent municipalities ===
The municipality consists of the centres of Ermenrod, Groß-Felda with constituent municipality of Schellnhausen, Kestrich, Köddingen, Stumpertenrod, Windhausen, and Zeilbach.

== History ==
=== Amalgamations ===
Feldatal came into being as a result of the municipal reforms in 1972 when the aforesaid constituent municipalities were united into a greater municipality.

== Politics ==
The municipal council is made up of 15 members. As of the municipal elections held on 26 March 2006, 4 seats are held by the SPD, 4 by the CDU, 6 by the FWG, a citizens' coalition, and one by the A.L.F.

The municipal executive is made up of 7 members and the mayor. Two seats are held by the SPD, 2 by the CDU, 2 by the FWG, and one by the A.L.F.

The current mayor, Leopold Bach, was elected in 2018.

=== Coat of arms ===
Feldatal's civic coat of arms might heraldically be described thus: Or a virgin-headed spreadeagle gules crowned azure, therein an inescutcheon argent a hammer and four nails azure.

The inescutcheon (smaller inner shield, called a Herzschild or "heartshield" in German heraldry) refers to the dominant handicraft in the municipality, namely nailsmithing. This trade was practised even into the early 20th century. The virgin-headed spreadeagle (Jungfrauenadler) has its roots in Feldatal's mediaeval noble family's arms.

== Culture and sightseeing ==
=== Buildings ===
- Hesse's biggest timber-framed church, built in 1696 (in Stumpertenrod)
- Zeilbach Church, built in 1668 – shake roof
- Kestrich Church, half-timbered, and right next door the former synagogue and Jewish school (in Kestrich)
- Jewish cemetery (in Kestrich)
- Still working mills, for instance Wolfenmühle in Groß-Felda, Burgsmühle in Zeilbach and Herrenmühle in Ermenrod.

=== Regular events ===
- Feldataler Mühlenfest ("mill festival")- Stumpertenrod
- Ostermarkt (Easter Market)- Gross Felda
- Weihnachtsmarkt (Christmas Market)
- Goldwing Meeting in Groß-Felda (every two years)
- Schmiedefest (Blacksmith festival)

== Economy and infrastructure ==
=== Transport ===
Through the municipality runs the Federal Highway (Bundesstraße) B 49.
