= Schwalmtal, Hesse =

Schwalmtal
- Municipality
- Coat of arms

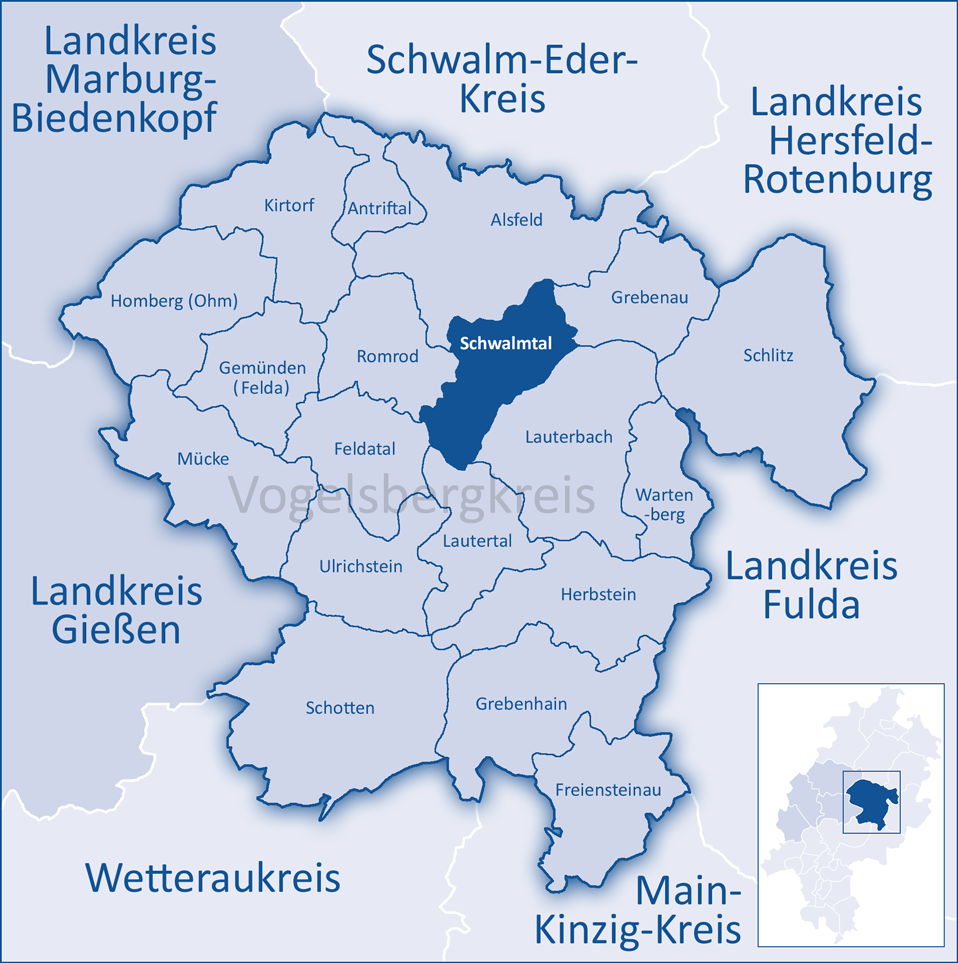
- Location of Schwalmtal within Vogelsbergkreis district
- Interactive map of Schwalmtal
- Location within Germany Location within Hesse
- Coordinates: 50°41′N 09°18′E
- Country: Germany
- State: Hesse
- Admin. region: Gießen
- District: Vogelsbergkreis

Government
  - Mayor (2023–29): Timo Georg

Area
  - Total: 54.36 km^{2} (20.99 sq mi)
- Elevation: 332 m (1,089 ft)

Population (2025-12-31)
  - Total: 2,721
  - Density: 50.06/km^{2} (129.6/sq mi)
- Time zone: UTC+01:00 (CET)
  - Summer (DST): UTC+02:00 (CEST)
- Postal codes: 36318
- Dialling codes: 06638, 06630
- Vehicle registration: VB
- Website: www.schwalmtal-hessen.de

Schwalmtal (German pronunciation: [ˈʃvalmˌtaːl], lit. 'Schwalm Valley') is a municipality in the Vogelsbergkreis in Hesse, Germany.

== Geography ==
=== Neighbouring municipalities ===
Schwalmtal borders in the north on the towns of Alsfeld and Grebenau, in the east on the town of Lauterbach, in the south on the municipality of Lautertal, and in the west on the municipality of Feldatal and the town of Nidda (Wetteraukreis) and the town of Romrod.

=== Constituent municipalities ===
The municipality of Schwalmtal consists of 9 centres:

- Brauerschwend (administrative seat)
- Renzendorf
- Rainrod
- Hopfgarten
- Hergersdorf
- Ober- and Unter-Sorg
- Vadenrod
- Storndorf

Brauerschwend and Storndorf are the two biggest of these centres, the latter being slightly bigger than the former.

== Politics ==
Currently represented on municipal council are three parties, the SPD, the CDU and the FWG (a citizens' coalition). The current mayor is an SPD member whose support on council derives from an SPD-FWG coalition.

== Economy and Transport ==
The constituent municipalities of Brauerschwend and Storndorf each have a primary school, a kindergarten and a grocer's shop. Furthermore there is a butcher's shop in each as well as branches of the Kreissparkasse/VR-Bank. The municipality's main industrial area is to be found in Storndorf. Moreover, the district rubbish tip, administered by the ZAV (Zentralstelle für Arbeitsvermittlung, or "Central Post for Work Placement"), lies in the municipality's outlying countryside. In the constituent municipality of Hopfgarten is one of Hesse's few knacker's yards (where old horses are slaughtered and the by-products are sent for rendering).

Renzendorf is home to the municipality's only railway station, and a location of the Bäckerei Karl (bakery) whose head office is in Storndorf.

Brauerschwend and Storndorf each have a medical general practice and a dental practice.

=== Transport ===
Through the municipality runs Federal Highway (Bundesstraße) 254 from Alsfeld by way of Lauterbach to Fulda. Whereas until a few years ago it went through some of the municipalities, there is now a bypass.
