= Grebenau =

- Town
- Coat of arms

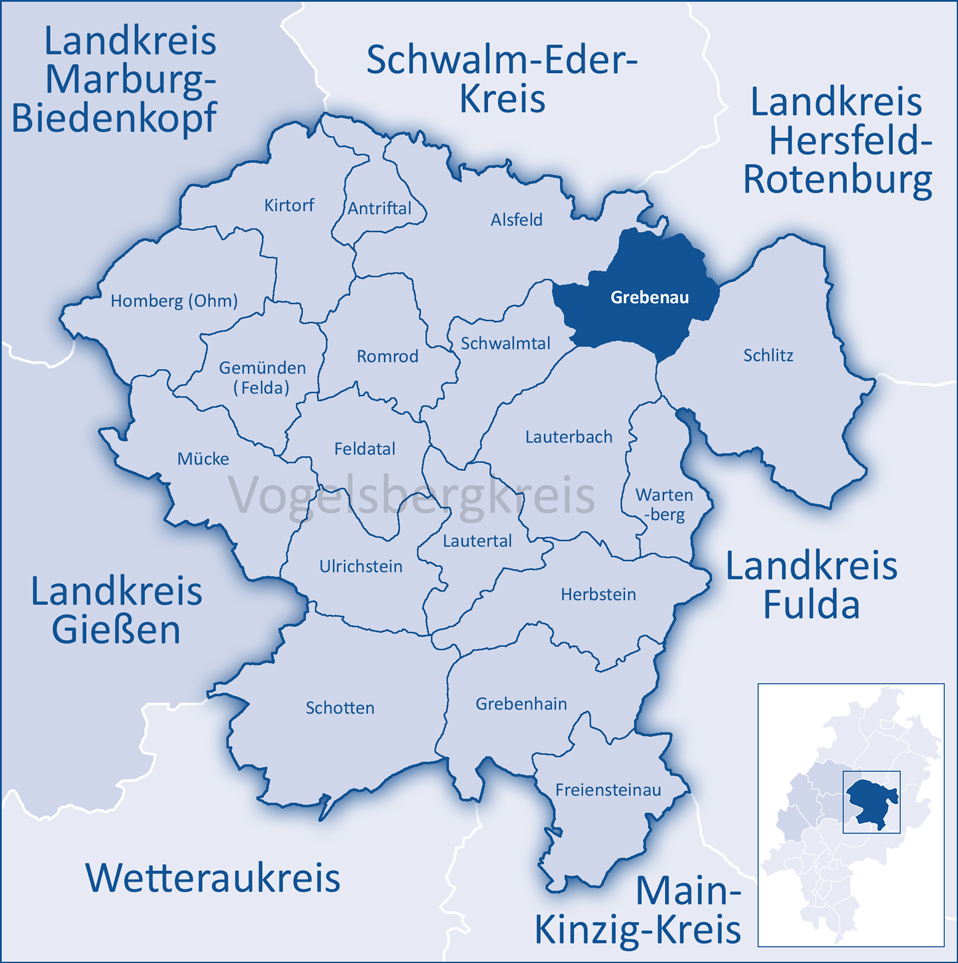
- Location of Grebenau within Vogelsbergkreis district
- Interactive map of Grebenau
- Location within Germany Location within Hesse
- Coordinates: 50°45′N 9°28′E
- Country: Germany
- State: Hesse
- Admin. region: Gießen
- District: Vogelsbergkreis
- Subdivisions: 7 Stadtbezirke

Government
  - Mayor (2019–25): Lars Wicke (FW)

Area
  - Total: 55.34 km^{2} (21.37 sq mi)
- Elevation: 286 m (938 ft)

Population (2025-12-31)
  - Total: 2,232
  - Density: 40.33/km^{2} (104.5/sq mi)
- Time zone: UTC+01:00 (CET)
  - Summer (DST): UTC+02:00 (CEST)
- Postal codes: 36323
- Dialling codes: 06646
- Vehicle registration: VB
- Website: www.grebenau.de

Grebenau (German pronunciation: [ˈɡʁeːbənaʊ]) is a town in the Vogelsbergkreis in Hesse, Germany.

== Geography ==
=== Location ===
Lying from 220 to 350 m above sea level, Grebenau is northeast of the Vogelsberg some 26 km northwest of Fulda, at the place where the Schwarza empties into the Jossa, itself a tributary to the Fulda.

=== Neighbouring municipalities ===
Grebenau borders in the north on the town of Alsfeld and the municipality of Breitenbach am Herzberg (Hersfeld-Rotenburg), in the east on the town of Schlitz, in the south on the town of Lauterbach, and in the west on the municipality of Schwalmtal, Hesse.

=== Constituent municipalities ===
- Bieben, representative Klaus Gaudl
  - Merlos – belongs to Bieben
- Eulersdorf, representative Ernst Hölscher
- Grebenau, representative Lotti Frick
- Reimenrod, representative Gerhard Agel
- Schwarz, representative Klaus Weitzel
- Udenhausen, representative Herbert Schäfer
- Wallersdorf, representative Gerd-Dieter Kaiser

== Politics ==
=== Town council ===
Chairman:

Herbert Appel (SPD)

- CDU: 6 seats, factional chairman Gerd-Dieter Kaiser
- SPD: 6 seats, factional chairman Helmut Ihm
- FWG (citizens' coalition): 3 seats, factional chairman Rudolf Dippel

(as of municipal elections held on 26 March 2006)

The municipal council is the legislative body governing local administrative affairs in Grebenau. Local elections determine the distribution of seats among political parties and citizen coalitions representing the town and its constituent districts (Stadtbezirke).
