= Alsfeld =

- Town
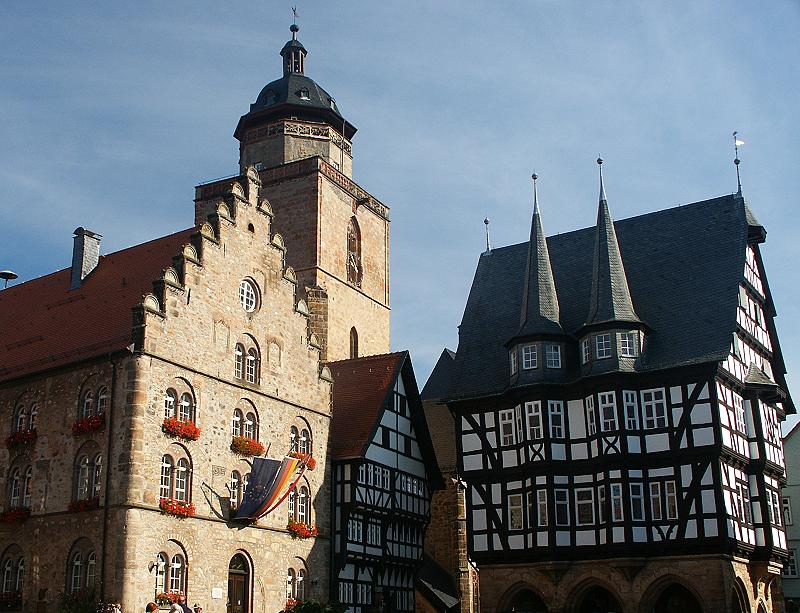
- Town Hall, Weinhaus, oldest timber-framed building and Walpurgiskirche

- Coat of arms

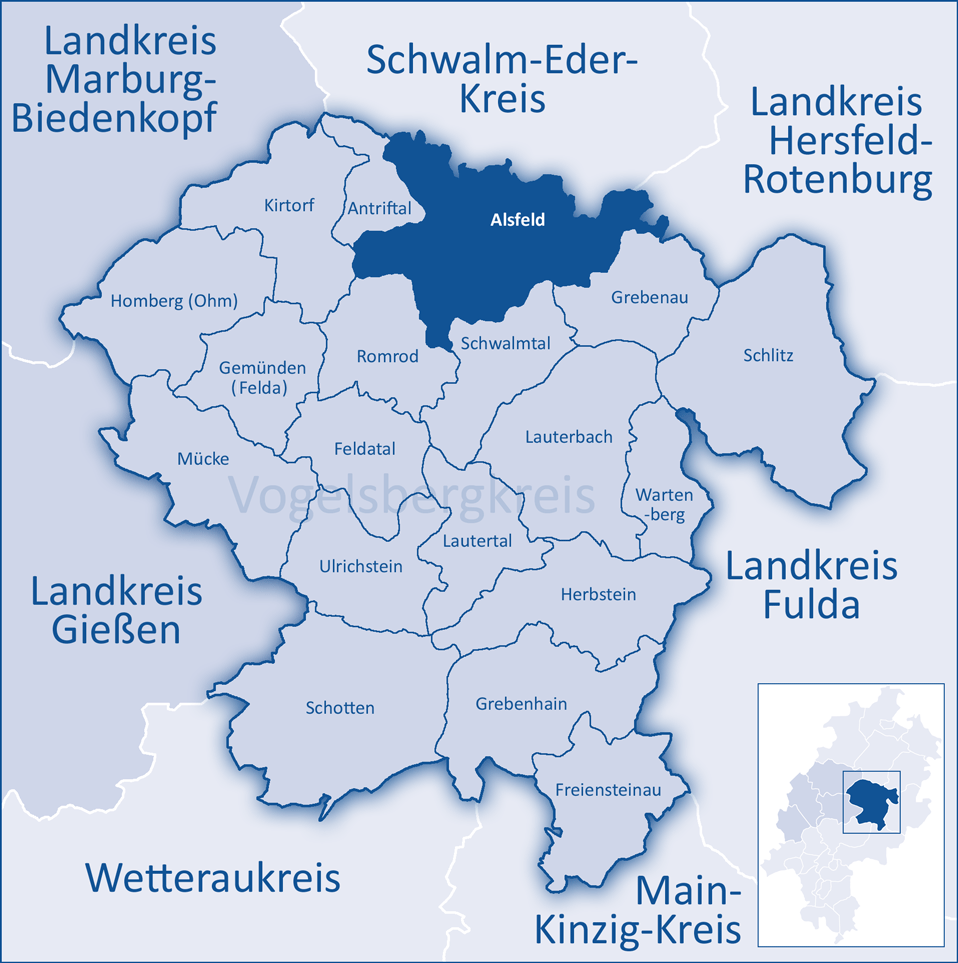
- Location of Alsfeld within Vogelsbergkreis district
- Interactive map of Alsfeld
- Location within Germany Location within Hesse
- Coordinates: 50°45′04″N 09°16′16″E
- Country: Germany
- State: Hesse
- Admin. region: Gießen
- District: Vogelsbergkreis
- Subdivisions: 16 Stadtteile

Government
  - Mayor (2025–31): Stephan Paule (CDU)

Area
  - Total: 129.71 km^{2} (50.08 sq mi)
- Elevation: 260–290 m (850–950 ft)

Population (2025-12-31)
  - Total: 15,279
  - Density: 117.79/km^{2} (305.08/sq mi)
- Time zone: UTC+01:00 (CET)
  - Summer (DST): UTC+02:00 (CEST)
- Postal codes: 36304
- Dialling codes: 06631
- Vehicle registration: VB
- Website: www.alsfeld.de

Alsfeld (German pronunciation: [ˈalsfɛlt]) is a town in the center of Hesse, in Germany.

Located about 100 km (62 mi) north of Frankfurt, Alsfeld is part of the densely populated Frankfurt Rhine-Main Metropolitan Region, with nearby Lauterbach (about 15 km (9.3 mi) east), one of the two centre cities of the Vogelsbergkreis district.

Alsfeld is best described as a blend of a historic bourgeois European town and its rural-agricultural environs and shaped by typical Lutheran-Pietist characteristics, such as austerity and a Protestant work ethic. It is well known for its well-preserved old town with hundreds of picturesque timber-frame houses, and part of the German Timber-Frame Road. The town is twinned with New Mills, England.

== Geography ==
Large towns nearby are Bad Hersfeld about 33 kilometres (21 miles) to the east, Fulda 36 kilometres (22 miles) to the southeast, Gießen 47 kilometres (29 miles) to the west and Marburg an der Lahn about 36 kilometres (22 miles) to the northwest. Alsfeld is located on the upper part of the Schwalm in the northern Vogelsberg and just to the south of the Knüll mountains at the western edge of the Alsfeld basin.

=== Neighbouring municipalities ===
Alsfeld borders on the following towns, listed here clockwise starting in the north: Willingshausen, Schrecksbach, Ottrau (all Schwalm-Eder district), Breitenbach (Hersfeld-Rotenburg district) and Grebenau, Schwalmtal, Romrod, Kirtorf and Antrifttal (all Vogelsbergkreis).

=== Boroughs ===
In addition to Alsfeld (proper) the town includes the following boroughs: Altenburg, Angenrod, Berfa, Billertshausen, Eifa, Elbenrod, Eudorf, Fischbach, Hattendorf, Heidelbach, Leusel, Liederbach, Lingelbach, Münch-Leusel, Reibertenrod and Schwabenrod.

== History ==
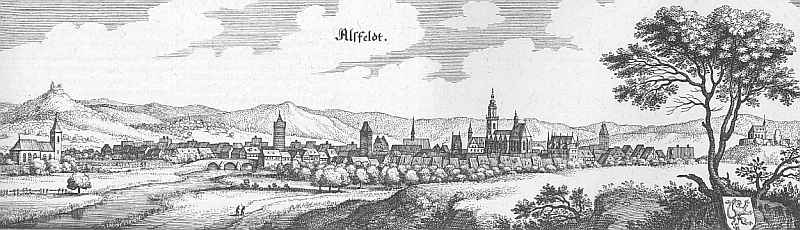
Alsfeld in 1655

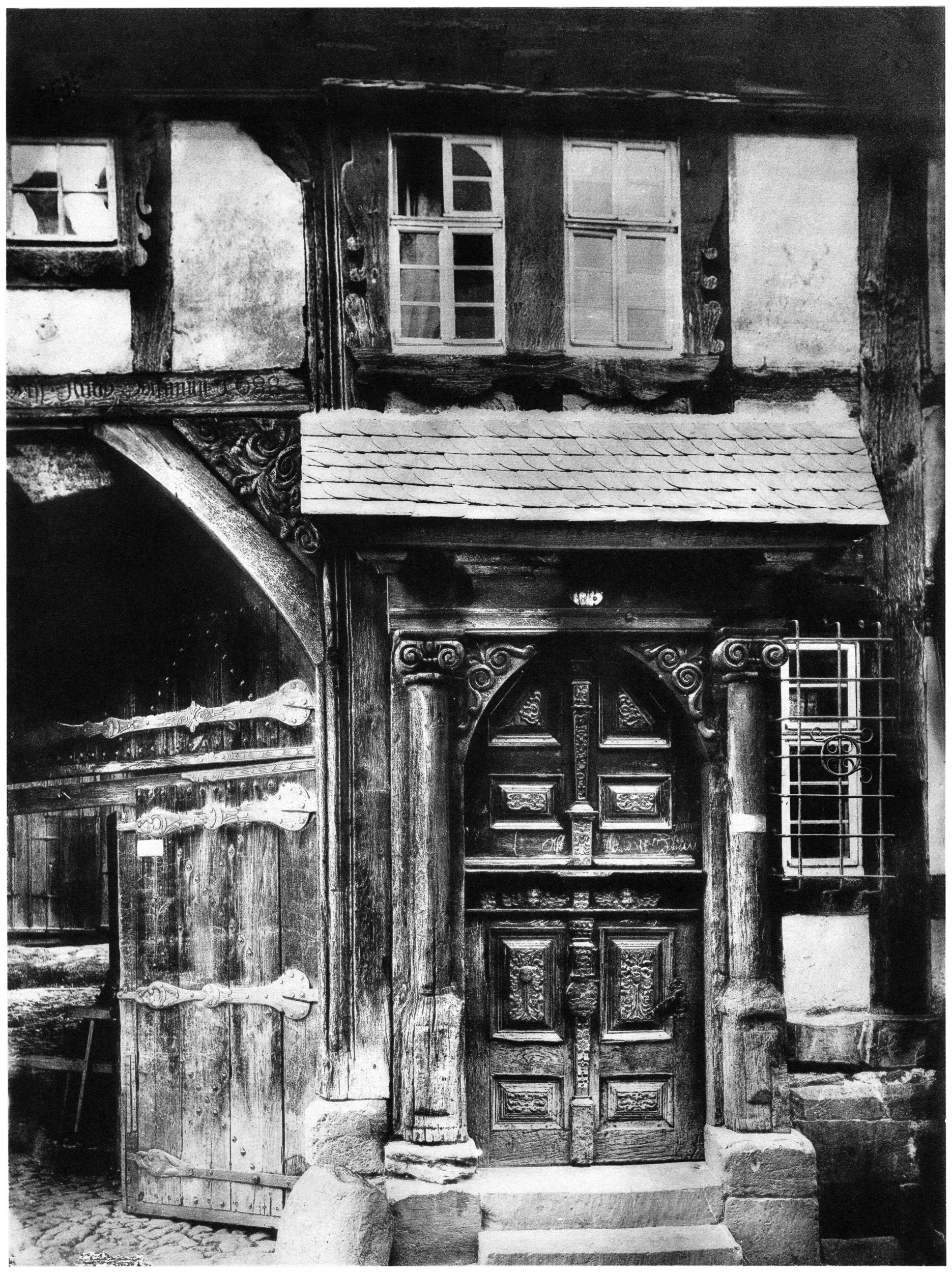
Renaissance door at the Neurathhaus, (photographed in 1874 or 1884 by Ludwig Bickell)

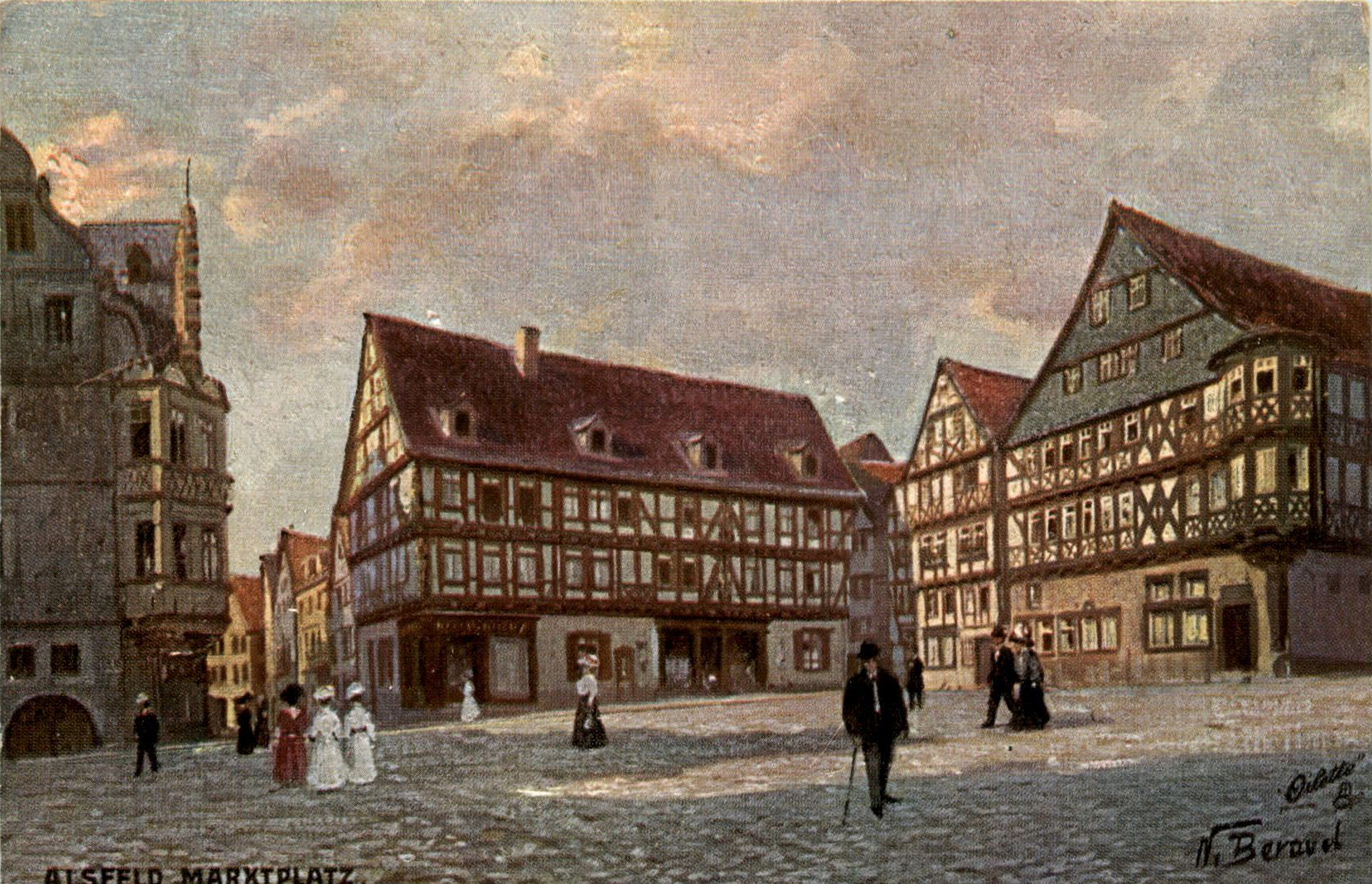
The market place on a postcard of 1910

Alsfeld was first mentioned in an official document in 1069. Excavations in the Walpurgiskirche have discovered that a Romanesque church existed here already in the 9th and 10th centuries. It is therefore estimated that the town was founded in Carolingian times. Between 1180 and 1190 the Counts of Thuringia built a castle along the historic trading route of the Kurze Hessen. That location favored the development of Alsfeld and it was subsequently documented as a town as early as 1222.

Since 1247 Alsfeld has been part of Hesse and in 1254 the town joined the Rheinischer Städtebund. Hermann II built himself a castle here in 1395 and for a time turned the town into his official residence. The city enjoyed rising prosperity due its favourable geographical location and the policies of the Landgrave of Hesse. Trades and handcrafts flourished and Alsfeld developed into a wealthy, industrious municipality on the “Street through the short Hesse”. Evidence of this is the church, monastery, towers, town hall and water supply system. Of great importance were the guilds, which gained influence over local government through the so-called “Korebrief” (constitution). From 1567 Alsfeld belonged to Hesse-Marburg and from 1604 on to Hesse-Darmstadt.

=== Alsfeld's golden age ===
Architecture was erected in the 16th century within the town, including the town hall (1512-1516), wine house (1538), and wedding house (1564-1571). Half-timbered buildings are found in the marketplace and streets around it; many of these have survived from the medieval period and early modern age.

Whereas the geographical position of Alsfeld had been to its advantage, it also led to its demise. The city was centred on important trade routes and the following 30 Years War (1618–1648) resulted in plunder (1622), starvation (1626), plague (1635), occupation (1640 and 1643–1646) and the destruction of 226 residential buildings and 80 cottages (1646). By 1648 only 1120 people were still living in the city (mainly women and children). The economic and social fall of the city created a population of struggling smallholders, active in crafts and trades and also agriculture. Many of the fine buildings fell into disrepair.

=== 19th century ===
During the 19th century the town had a vibrant Jewish municipality which built in 1908 a new large synagogue. A well-maintained Jewish cemetery adjacent to a Christian cemetery lies on the outskirts of the town. The pre-1908 synagogue exists as a building. It wasn't until the 19th century, in 1832, that Alsfeld was to experience a renewed rise as the district capital. Railway construction (1870) and the industrial revolution resulted in the fundamental transformation of the smallholding system.

=== Nazism and the World War II-period ===
Alsfeld held a special significance for Nazi ideologists. For them, it was the epitome of the German 'Home Town', representing all that was quintessentially German. Throughout the 1930s, the Nazi organization KDF (Kraft durch Freude) "Strength through Joy" organized regular day trips to Alsfeld from all across the Reich. In 1938 Alsfeld was one of the first towns that got a connection to the Autobahn.

During the Kristallnacht on 9 November 1938, Nazis burned down the large synagogue in the city. Citizens rescued the Torah scroll, the wooden Ark in which it was stored, and a unique wooden clock recording times of Jewish prayer services, and hid them in the town museum's storage. The next day, the Nazis started the systematic deportation of Jews. In 1942, Alsfeld expelled its last Jewish citizen.

On 29 March 1945, German troops left the city. The U.S. Army entered the town on 30 March 1945. The civilian population surrendered without resistance. Alsfeld, unlike most German cities and towns, was spared from Allied bombing raids during the war. But, as Alsfeld was neither an industrial center nor a transport hub, it did not present a tactical or strategic target. Allied air raids focused extensively on the railway tracks.

=== History after 1945 ===
The excellent infrastructure, including the Hamburg–Frankfurt–Basel Autobahn (motorway) brought further industrialization ensured that the location regained its previous geographic and economic importance, the Bundesgrenzschutz chose Alsfeld as a garrison base. In 1961, the town hosted the first Hessentag state festival, in 1985 the 25th.

Until 1972 it was the seat of Alsfeld district until the district was merged with neighbouring Lauterbach district and the Schotten region into the present-day Vogelsberg district. As a result of the district reform that took effect on 11 July 1972, the villages of Berfa, Hattendorf, Liederbach and Lingelbach were merged into the town of Alsfeld.

European model city

Previously surrounded by an oval shaped city wall with four gates, the medieval town of Alsfeld is still characterised by half-timbered buildings alongside residential buildings and monumental civic constructions. The narrow, twisting streets and passages open out into courtyards and squares. Visitors are provided with a complete overview of the development of wood construction from the late Middle Ages to the beginning of the nineteenth century. For the past 100 years a conscious cultural conservation has been nurtured to preserve the buildings. Ever since local statutes instated in 1963, civic bodies have been obliged to care and preserve the old city landscape.

As a result of these efforts, particularly the renovation of the old city, which began in 1967, Alsfeld was selected by the European council as one of 51 exemplary cities in 17 European countries for the European Year of Building Preservation.

The Name Alsfeld

One of the many legends about how Alsfeld came to its name and location goes as follows: Around 1200 the Margrave of Hesse/Thuringia went riding his horse over the Vogelsberg. When he got to the Homberg (a hill near Alsfeld) a very strong wind was blowing. Supposedly at this point the Margrave said: "Als fällt mir der Hut vom Kopp." (trans. I keep losing my hat.) The "Als fällt" in that statement supposedly became the name "Alsfeld" – it has the same pronunciation.

== Government ==
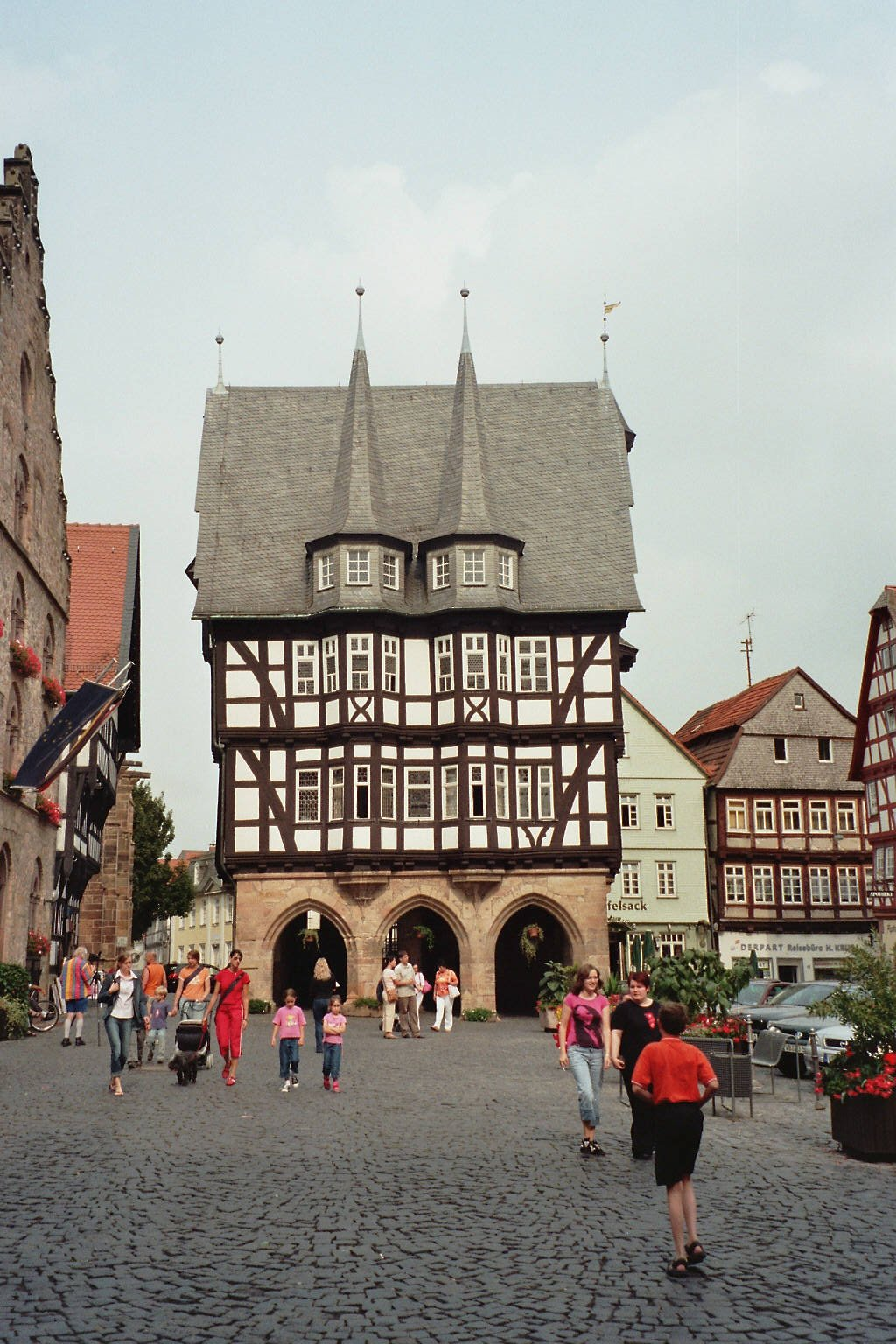
Alsfeld town hall

=== Town council and executive ===
After the municipal elections of 6 March 2016 the town council was made up of 37 councillors:

Party	Seats
CDU	18
SPD	12
UWA (Independents)	4
ALA (Alternative List)	3

The town's executive has ten members:

Party	Seats
CDU	4
SPD	3
UWA	2
ALA	1

=== Mayors ===
The current mayor, Stephan Paule, was elected on 26 May 2013, with a 55,8% share of the vote.

- 1993–1999: Herbert Diestelmann (SPD)
- 1999–2005: Herbert Diestelmann (SPD)
- 2005–2007: Herbert Diestelmann (SPD)
- 2007–2013: Ralf Becker (SPD)

=== Coat of arms ===
The Coat of Arms is blazoned as:"Azure a sword Argent gripped Or and a lion rampant Gules, armed and crowned Or"

The oldest seal of the town features the Count of Hesse as judge with a sword in one hand and a shield in the other. That shield depicted the lion of Hesse. The combination used today has been seen since the late 14th century; since then there have only been some minor variations in color.

Twin Towns

Alsfeld is twinned with multiple places across Europe:

New Mills, Derbyshire, United Kingdom

Spišská Nová Ves, Slovakia.

Nakskov, Zealand, Denmark.

Chaville, France.

== Main sights ==
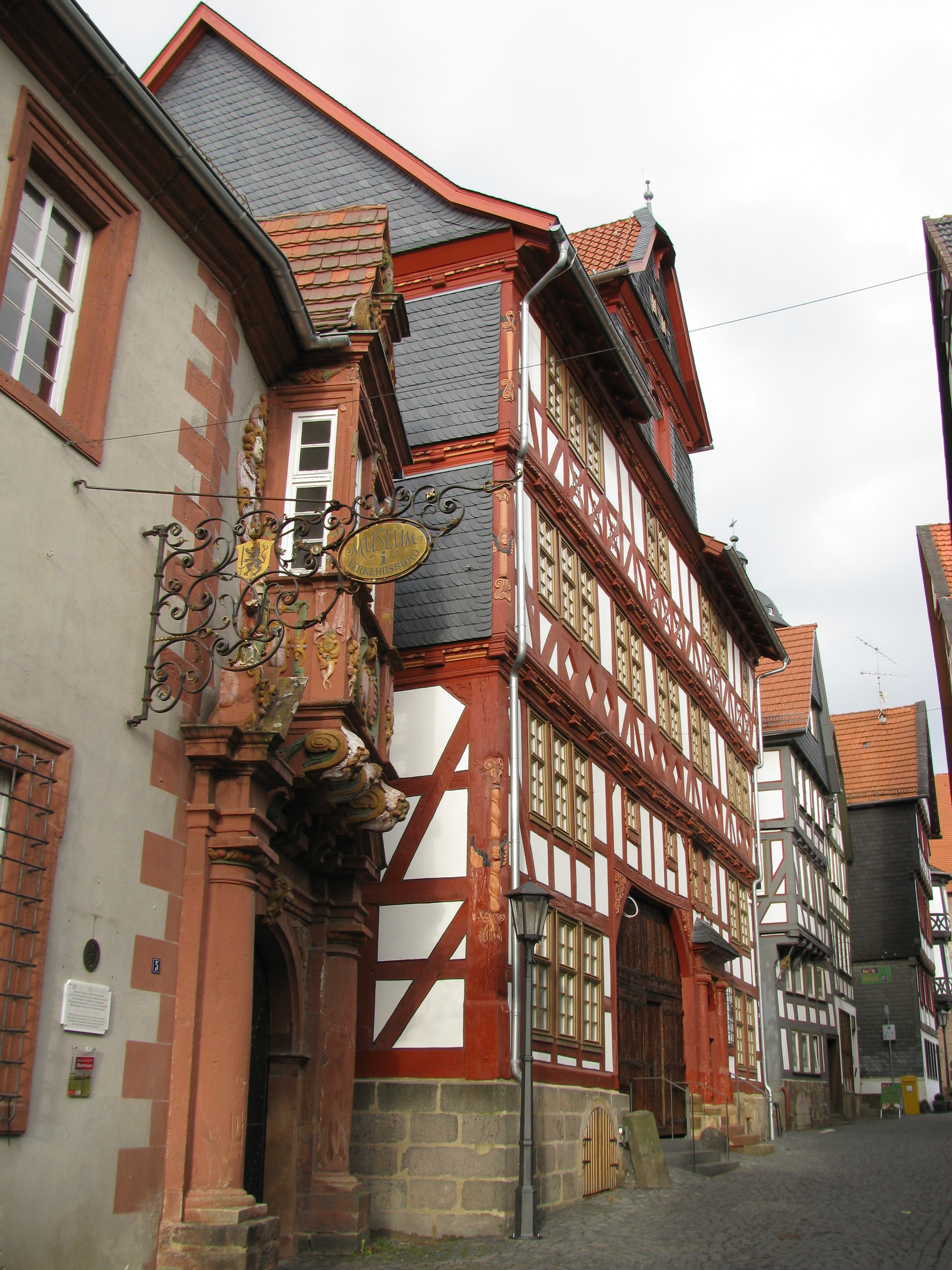
Ritterstraße (Knights Street )

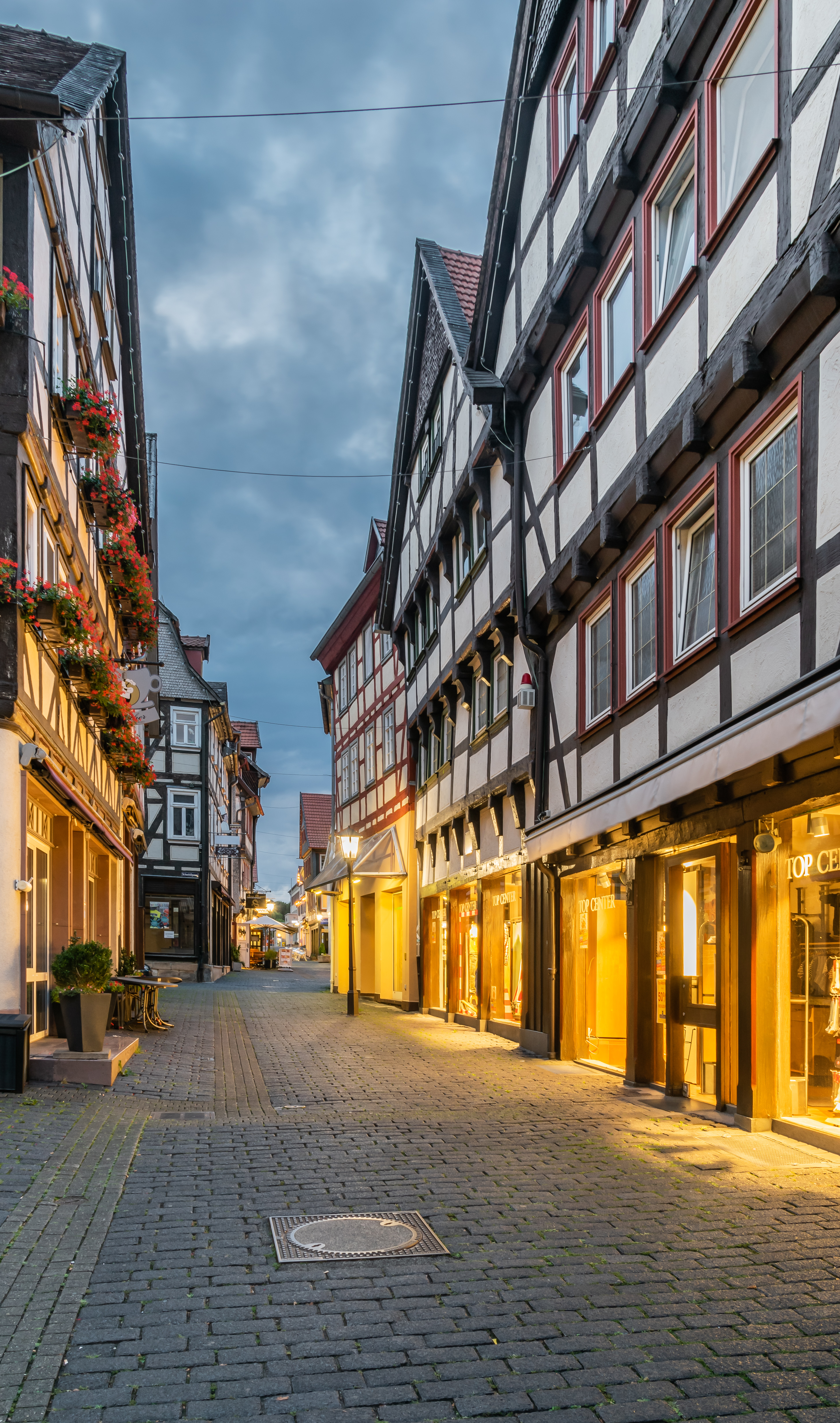
Obergasse

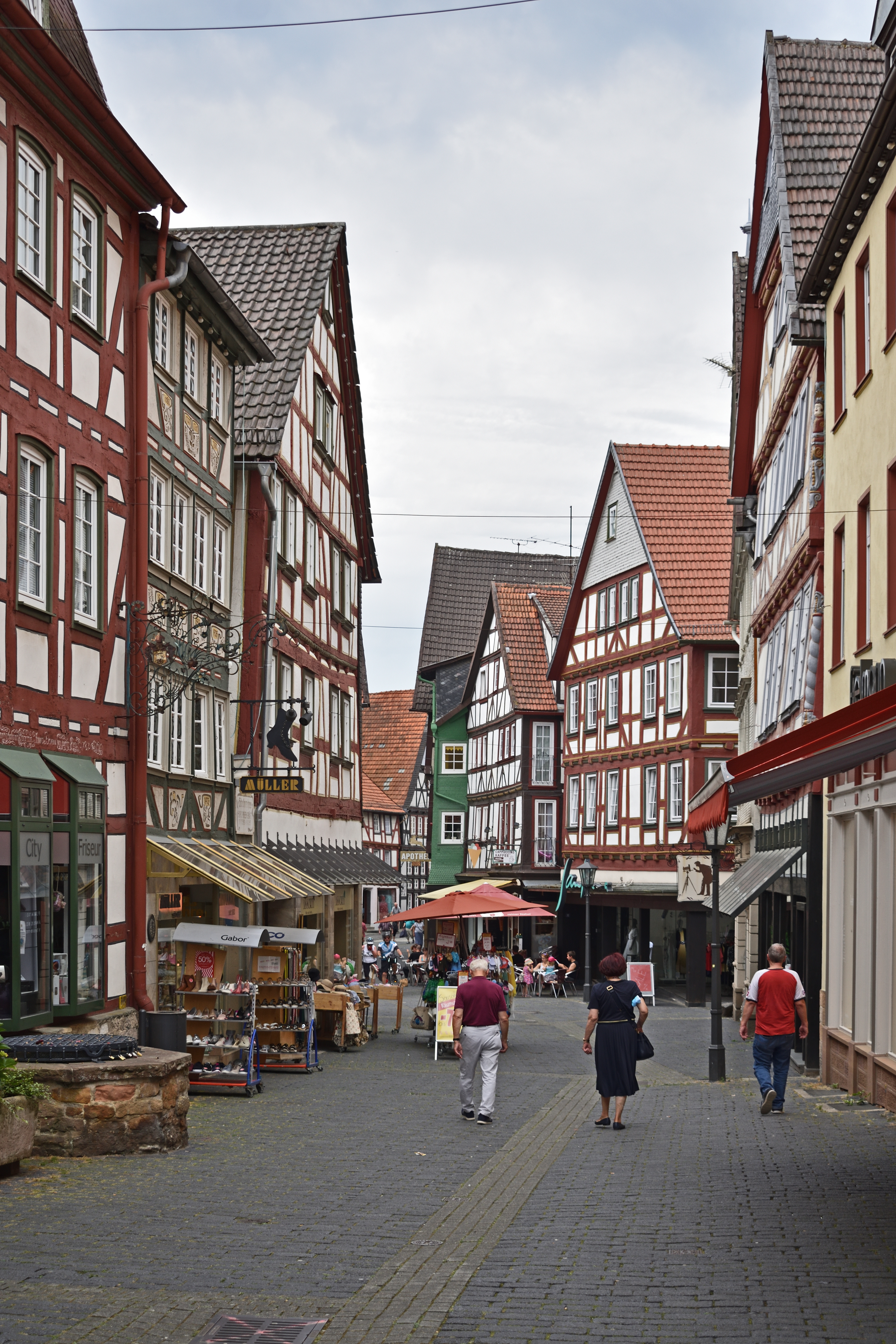
Mainzer Gasse

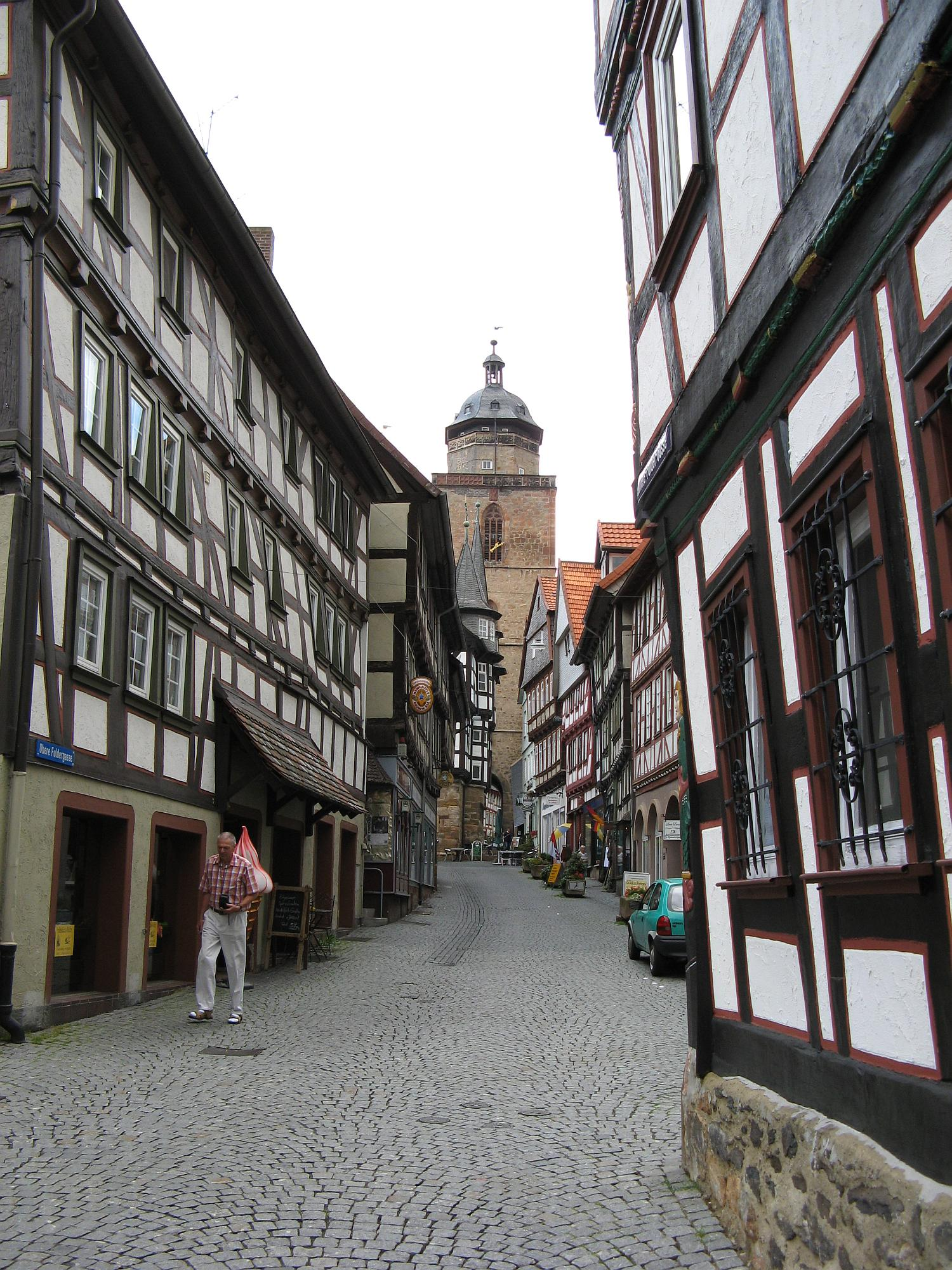
Obere Fulder Gasse

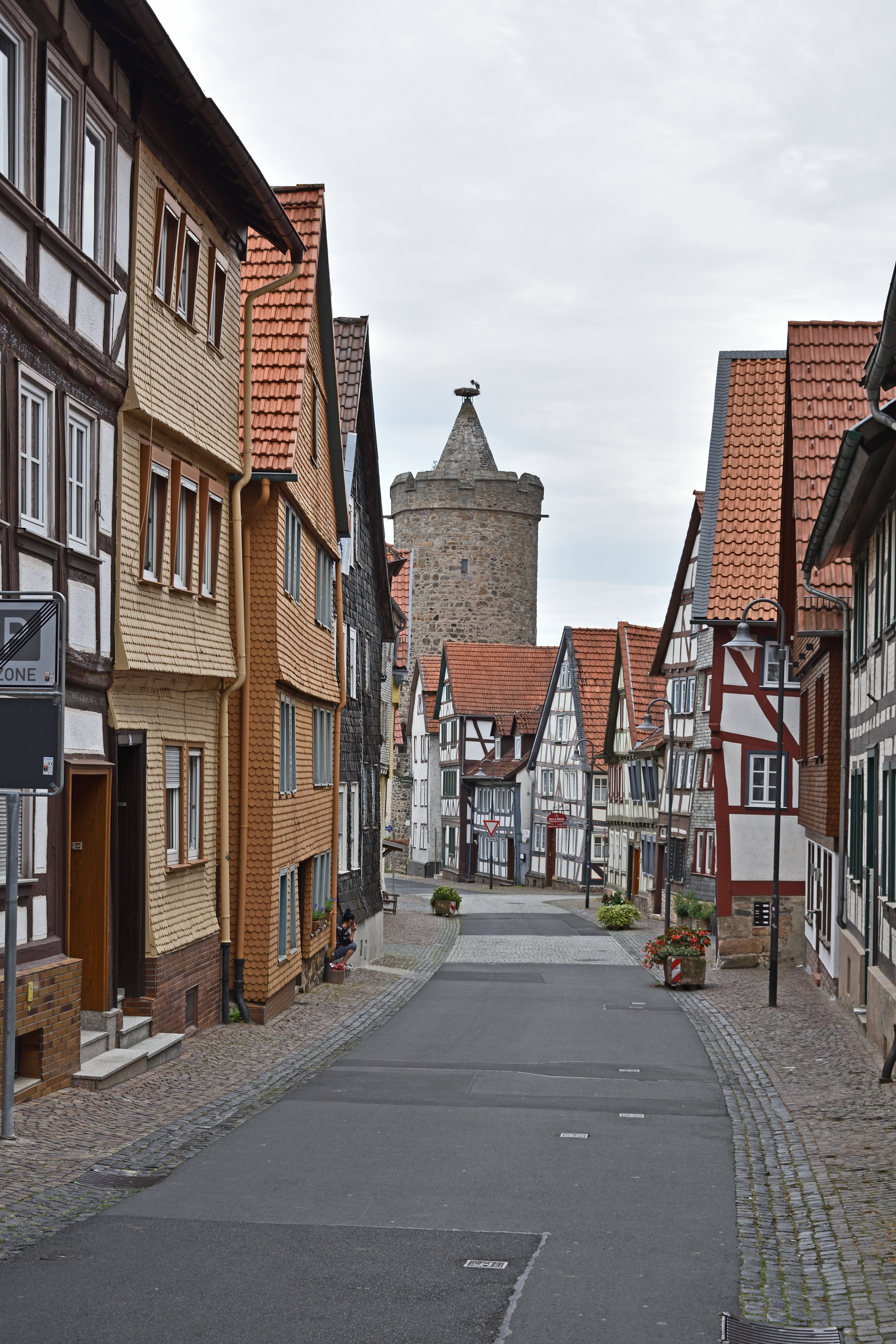
Untere Fulder Gasse with Leonhardsturm

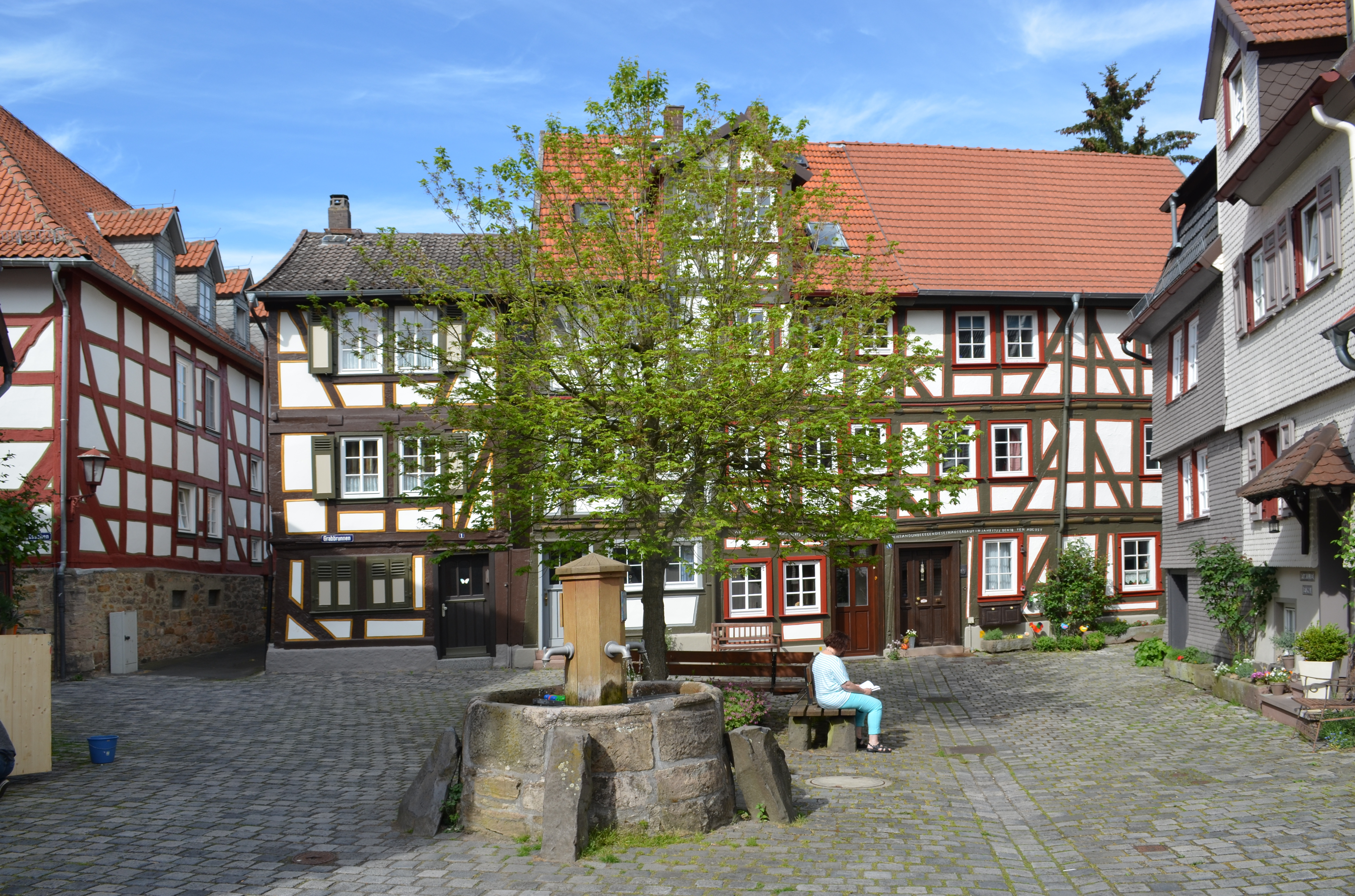
Grabbrunnen

The town is known for its Altstadt, the historic town centre, with its uninterrupted blocks of historic buildings. The Altstadt has a typical layout for a medieval town. The town wall was built in an almost perfect circle centred on the market place (for strategic reasons). Roads lead mostly straight from the gates in the wall to the town centre. One can deduce where the town wall was from the picturesque narrow streets which remain in their original state: their bends and curves in those small streets follow the original town wall.

=== Buildings at the market place (Markt) ===
The market place

The Town Hall was constructed in medieval, Rähmbau style timber framing between 1512 and 1516. This is one of the most important German half-timbered town hall buildings. Erected over a late Gothic stone substructure, this building with its attractive woodwork, bent chevron bracing and protruding moulded beam-ends, is an outstanding example of a "Rähmbau" (frame construction). The ground storey, built of stone, was once a market hall. The "Alsfeld cubit" can still be seen on the left corner. On the first floor the offices of the Mayor and Magistrate are situated. Since 1633 the councilmen have had their coats of arms on display. On the second floor, interesting old doors lead into the meeting room and the Registry Office (formerly the Court Room). Michael Finck, the local artist and carpenter, designed and crafted the magnificent Renaissance door in 1604. Curt Oberman forged the decorative hinges. It is next to the market place in the center of the Altstadt.

Next to the Town Hall is the Weinhaus ("Wine House"). This impressive municipal stone building was constructed by Hans von Frankfurt and used to store and sell wine. Business deals, celebrations and special events were toasted and validated with wine. Wine sales generated up to 40% of the town's income. The transition between the Gothic and Renaissance architecture can be seen in the steep stepped gables and the fan rosettes facing. The original irregular, stone curtained windows were unfortunately replaced in 1840 /43 by the present rounded windows. Remains of the earlier windows are still visible. At the corner of the Weinhaus is the Pranger, a lockable iron collar into which mediaeval law-breakers were locked. They then had to suffer the verbal and physical abuse of their fellow citizens without any means of defending themselves. The Pranger is much photographed by tourists.

Leaning up against the Weinhaus is Markt 2 the oldest timber-framed house in Alsfeld, a Gothic, half-timbered house in pillar construction. It has two barrel shaped cellars dating back to the time when the city was founded. In 1394 when a large section of the Walpurgis Church Tower collapsed, the right-hand side of the house was severely damaged. It was rebuilt in 1403 and 1464–65. The uppers storeys jetty (project) above the storey below giving additional living space to each upper storey. The hall on the ground floor is now used as a bookshop. The upper floors house municipal offices.

The Hochzeitshaus (wedding house) is a renaissance building was built between 1564 and 1571, according to the plans of master builder Hans Meurer. The upper floors, which were accessible via a stone spiral staircase, were used for festivities, which is why the name of the wedding house prevailed for the building.

=== Walpurgiskirche (Walpurgis Church) ===
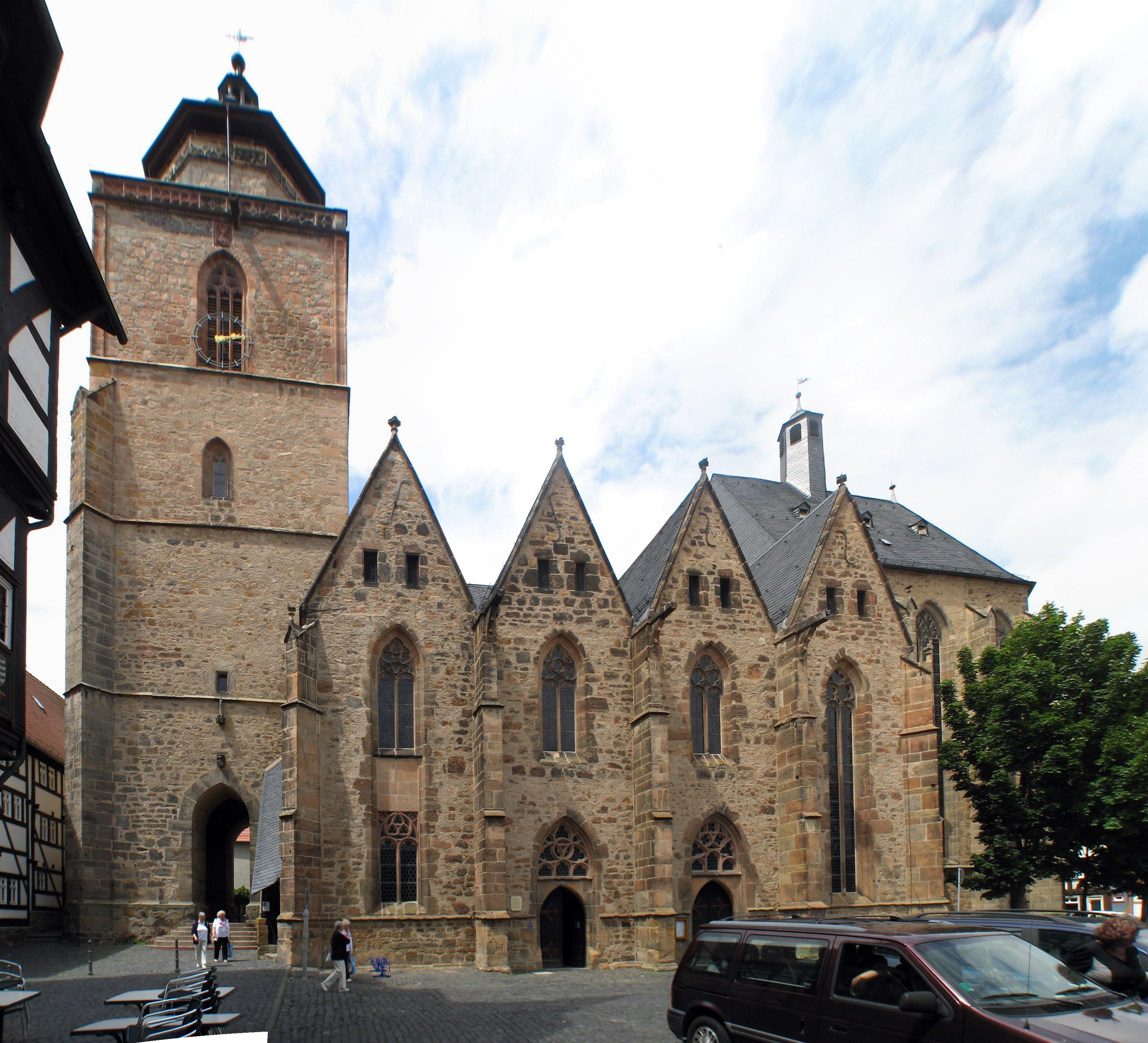
Walpurgiskirche

The Walpurgiskirche is the main civic church in Alsfeld, dedicated to St. Walpurga, has a complicated building history. This is reflected both in the interior design and in the outer construction. Excavations carried out in 1971–1972, revealed the remains of the oldest section, a three apses Roman Church dating back to the 8th/9th century. In the late 13th century an early Gothic Basilica was built, with a low, elongated choir and west tower. In 1393, the choir was reconstructed, made longer and substantially higher. Plans to reconstruct the long house had to be cancelled as the church tower collapsed in 1394 and the funds were needed for reconstruction. In 1492, the existing basilica was further developed. Later the aisles were widened and heightened to form high arcades and create a hall-like church. Features include: a Roman baptismal font, late Gothic frescoes, carved altar, paintings, choir seating, baroque epitaphs and a late Gothic crucifixion group.

Work on the collapsed tower commenced soon after the event and was only completed in 1542, with a strengthened octagonal storey topped by a Renaissance canopy. In 1836 one storey was removed. The tower has 7 bells, is approximately 50 metres high and was the residence of the tower keeper until 1921. Every year the traditional "Cradle of Christ" music is played over the Christmas Period. A trombone choir performs the traditional "May Blowing" every night during the month of May from the top of the tower. The extensive stained glass art in the church was created in 1963 by Charles Crodel.

=== The Dreifaltigkeitskirche (Trinity Church) and the former Augustine monastery ===
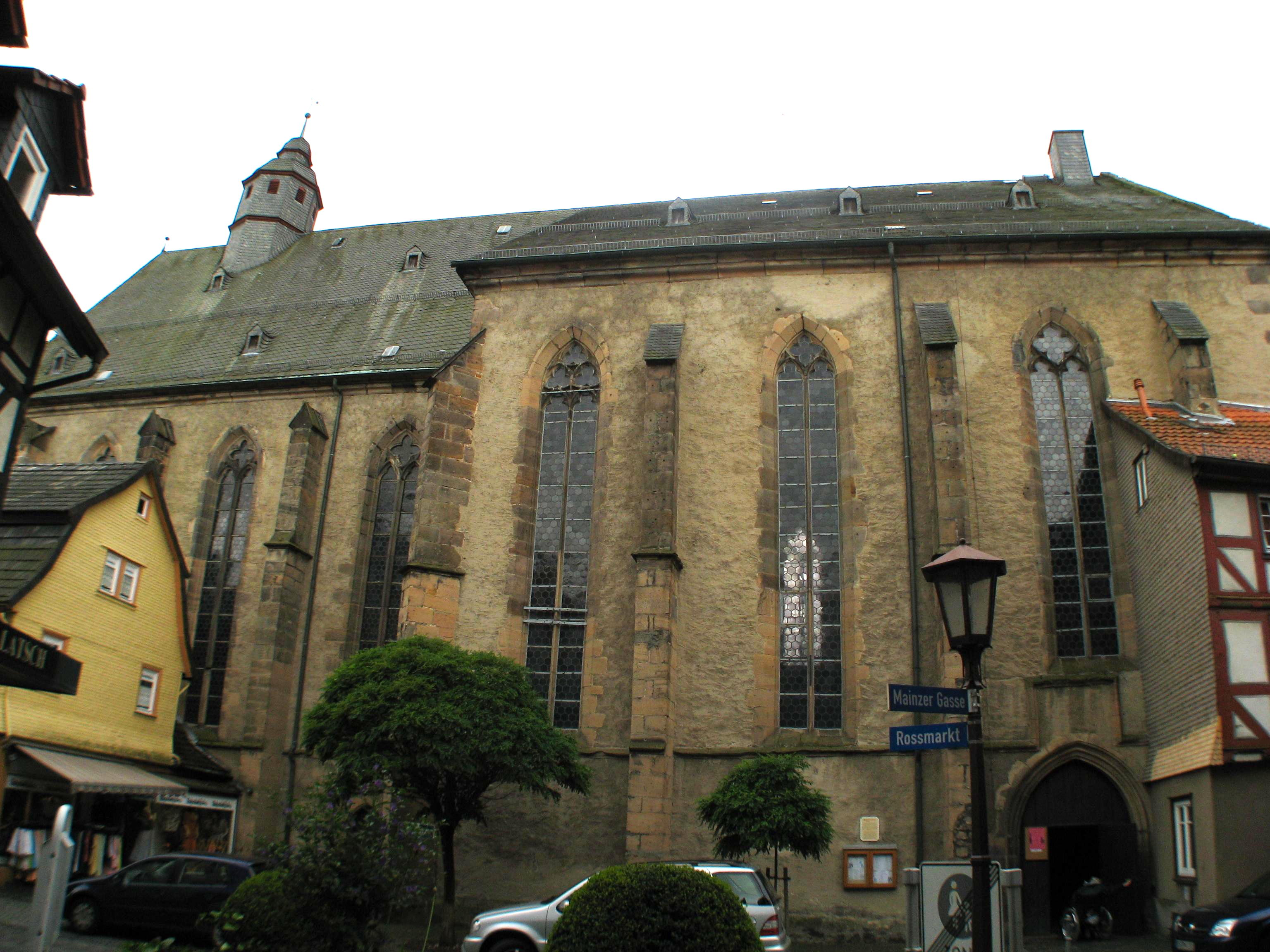
Dreifaltigkeitskirche

The Dreifaltigkeitskirche (Trinity Church) is a former monastery church of the Augustine hermits, with a long choir for the clergy built in the second half of the 14th century. Around 1435 an asymmetrical hall was added with naves and side aisles. There is no church tower as the monks belonged to a begging order. A closer view of the church on the inside reveals a well preserved cross-ribbed dome, a beautiful stone chancel with a pulpit ceiling from around 1660, as well as late Gothic frescoes from the early part of the 15th century, It was restored in 1960–62.

The former Augustine monastery was presumably founded towards the end of the 13th century, and occupied by Eremite Hermit Monks. This is where Luther's friend, Tilemann Schnabel, the reformer of Alsfeld lived and worked. At the time of the Reformation, in 1527, the monastery and church were closed down. Subsequently, the buildings were used as a hospital and finally left to ruin. One remaining monastery wall shows where the monks’ cells were located. The monastery was situated along the city wall, which had four gates and was largely demolished in the 19th century. A short section of the city wall remains and can be seen on the south side.

=== Kirchplatz (Church square) with Beinhaus ===
The late Gothic Beinhaus was originally built in 1368 and reconstructed in 1510, on the north side of the churchyard. Later used for preserving the skeletons from the surrounding cemetery. (The cemetery was too small to cope with the number of deaths in the 30 Year War and the various plagues.) The chapel was later misused for profane purposes. At the beginning of the 20th century alterations were carried out to the attic roof. Since its restoration in 1982, the building has housed the city archives.

=== Grabbrunnen ===
The Grabbrunnen is a square named after the fountain of the same name in Alsfeld's old town. According to legend, newborn children were taken from it. The idyllic square has only been accessible to pedestrians since the 1970s.

=== Leonhardsturm (Leonard's Tower) ===
Only a small section of the town wall remains, together with the Leonhardsturm (Leonard's Tower). In 1386 the former city fortress had numerous towers of which the Leonhard's Tower is the last remaining. A rounded tower with cone and battlement crest, it is 27 metres high. Entrance was from the city wall, through a doorway halfway up the tower. At the base of the tower was the dungeon, which was used for holding prisoners sentenced to death. The tower is known locally as the "Storks’ Nest". Legend has it that babies were ordered from the storks nesting there.

=== Museums ===
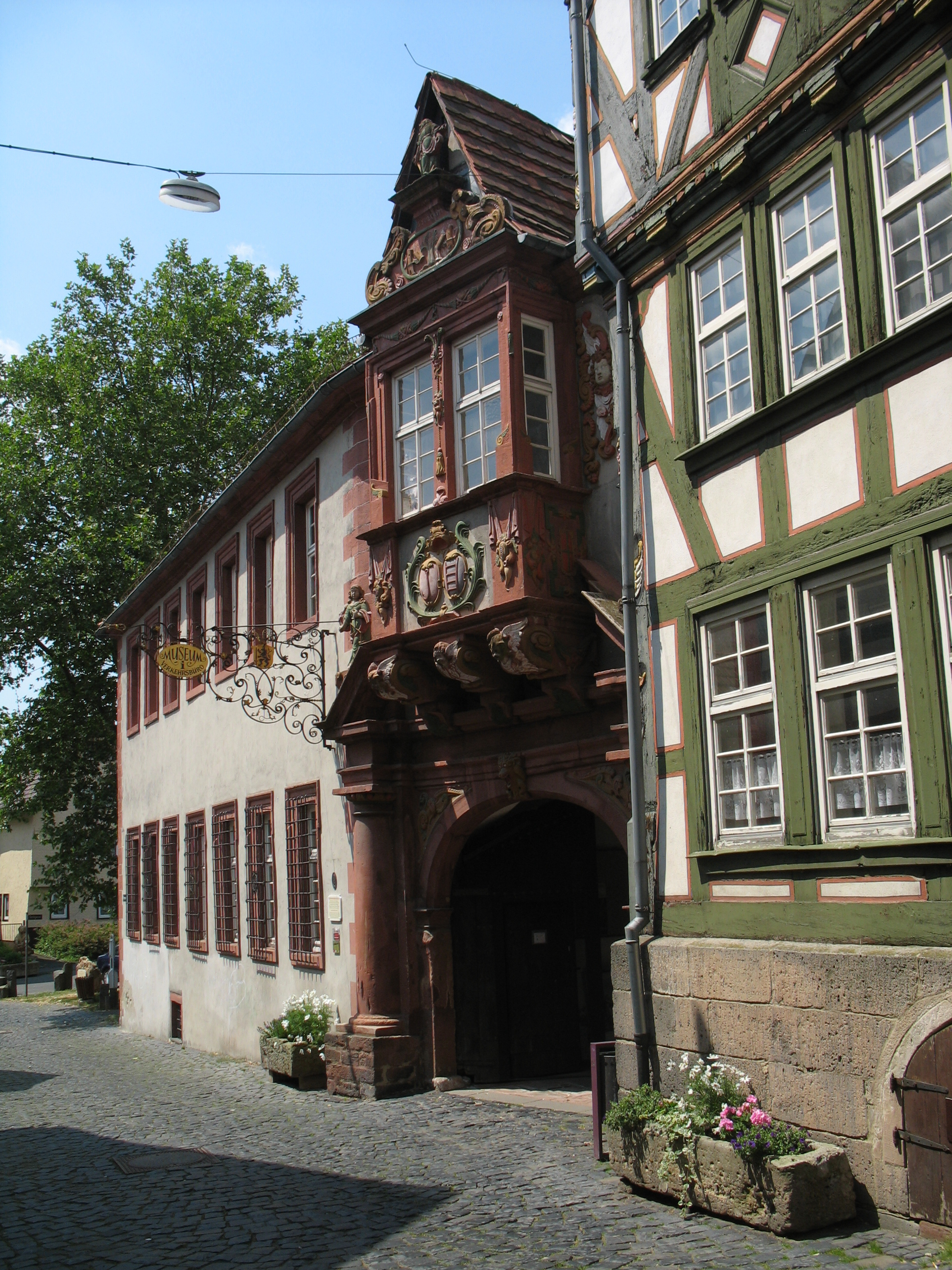
Stadtmuseum

- The Stadtmuseum (formerly: Regionalmuseum Alsfeld), located in the former Patrician homes Neurath-Haus (built in 1688) and the Minnigerode-Haus (built in 1687), hosts speaking events and other occasions and often puts on small exhibitions
- Alsfeld Fairy Tale House: opening hours and event calendar are available at the Alsfeld Tourist Centre in the marketplace
- Haus Speier: A museum about the Jewish history of the region, located in the borough Angenrod.

== People and culture ==
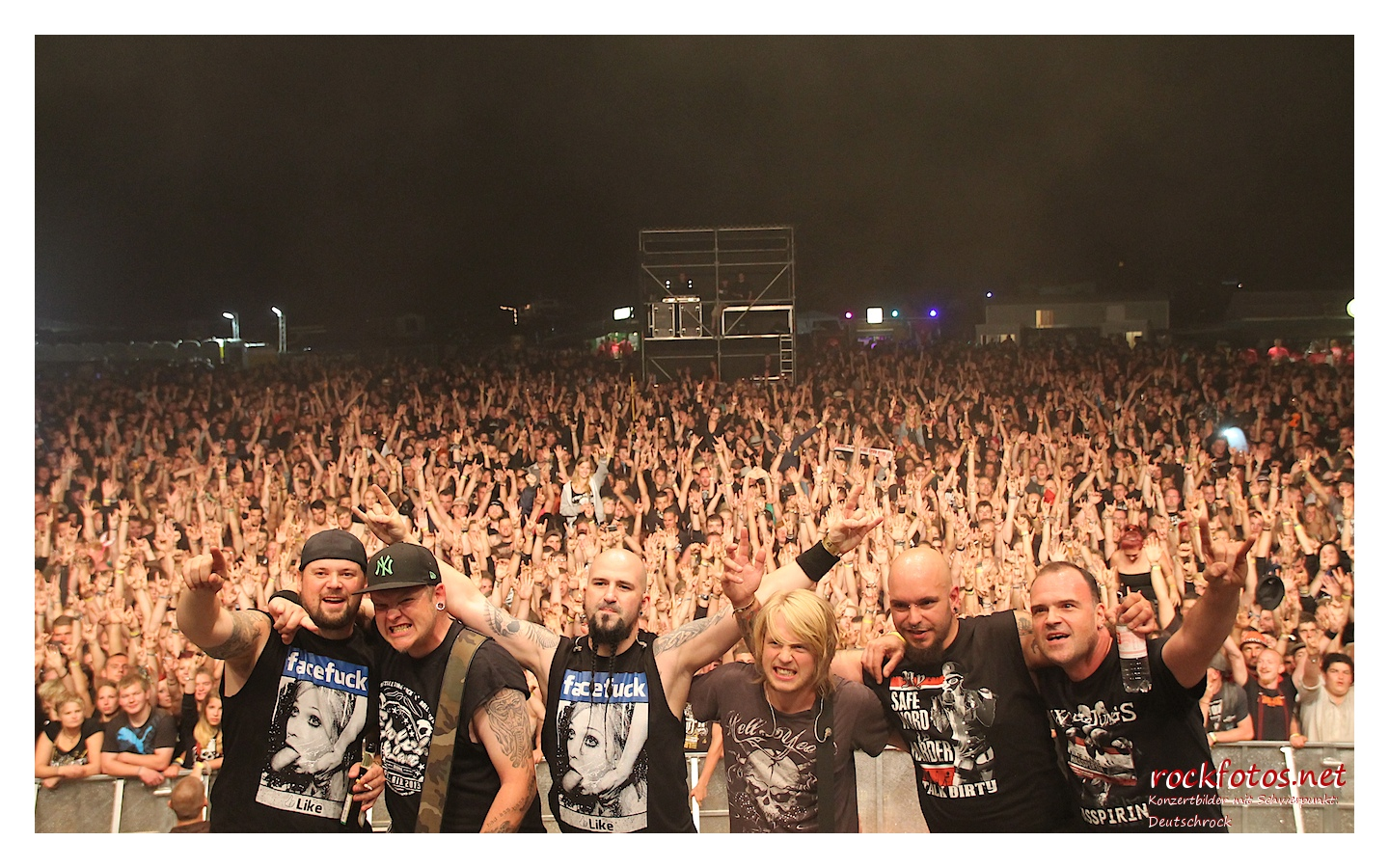
A concert in the Hessenhalle

Cultural life is characterized on the one hand by numerous celebrations at Alsfeld market place and nationally because of the Hessenhalle, primarily because of the concerts.

=== Events ===
- Regular rock, Pop and traditional concerts held in the Hessenhalle municipality center
- Alsfeld Herbal and Fairy Tale-Day (On a Sunday in May/June)
- Alsfeld Whitsun Fair
- Alsfeld Town Festival (1st Saturday in August)
- Alsfeld Christmas Market
- Vogelsberg Specialties: Various popular activities staged by the citizens of Alsfeld on the first Saturday of each month
- Farmers and specialty market on the third Saturday of each month
- Annual theatre productions take place in local high schools

=== Cultural references ===
In Alsfeld the Brothers Grimm found the inspiration for the Little Red Riding Hood. The town also has appeared in several films, notably fantasies.

== Infrastructure ==
Alsfeld is situated right off the Alsfeld East and Alsfeld West exits on the Autobahn A 5

The Pfefferhöhe rest area near Alsfeld is the second highest rest area (in altitude) along the A 5, and also a popular meeting place.

Visitors can reach Alsfeld station also by train via the Vogelsberg Railway (Gießen–Alsfeld–Fulda). In addition, from 1 April 1916 until 1974, the Gründchen Railway connected Alsfeld with Niederaula. Passenger traffic on the Gründchen line was discontinued on 25 May and the last freight train left Alsfeld on 28 May 1974. Since then the right-of-way between Alsfeld and Breitenbach has been returned to nature to varying degrees.

== Notable people ==
- Johann Adam Birkenstock (1687–1733), violinist and composer
- Wilhelm Gottlieb Soldan (1803-1869), historian and politician.
- Samuel Spier (1838–1903), one of the founders of the German Social Democrats

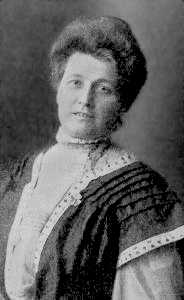
Henny Koch

- Wilhelm Kobelt (1840–1916), zoologist
- Henny Koch (1854–1925), author
- Rudolf Stammler (1856–1938), legal philosopher
- Alexander Fritz (1857–1932), chess master
- Karl Koch (1910–1944), cyclist
- Gerd Ludwig (born 1947), German-American documentary photographer and photojournalist
- Peter Gruss (born 1949), President of the Max Planck Society (2002-2014 )
- Georg Schmidt (born 1951), historian
- Lothar Hennighausen (born 1952), Geneticist at NIDDK at the National Institute of Health
- Manfred Stumpf (born 1957), German draftsman, sculptor and digital artist
- Stephan Weidner (born 1963), lyrics, bass and vocals for Böhse Onkelz
- Jürgen Hahn (born 1964), jazz musician
- Andrea Zimmer (born 1969), painter
- Tina Malti (born 1974), psychologist
- Viktoria Schwalm (born 1997), soccer player
