= Ulrichstein =

- Town
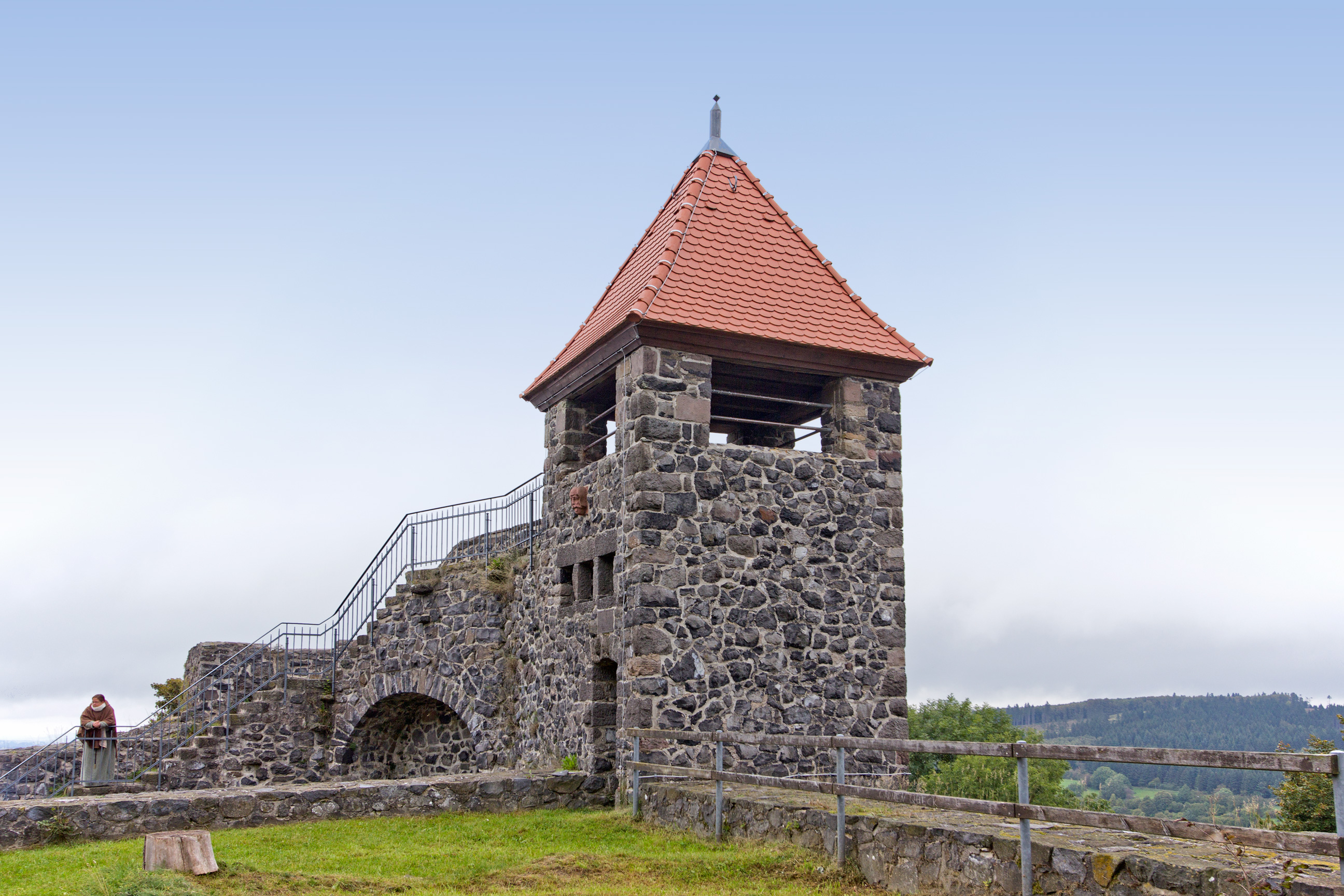
- The castle

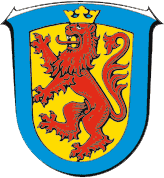
- Coat of arms

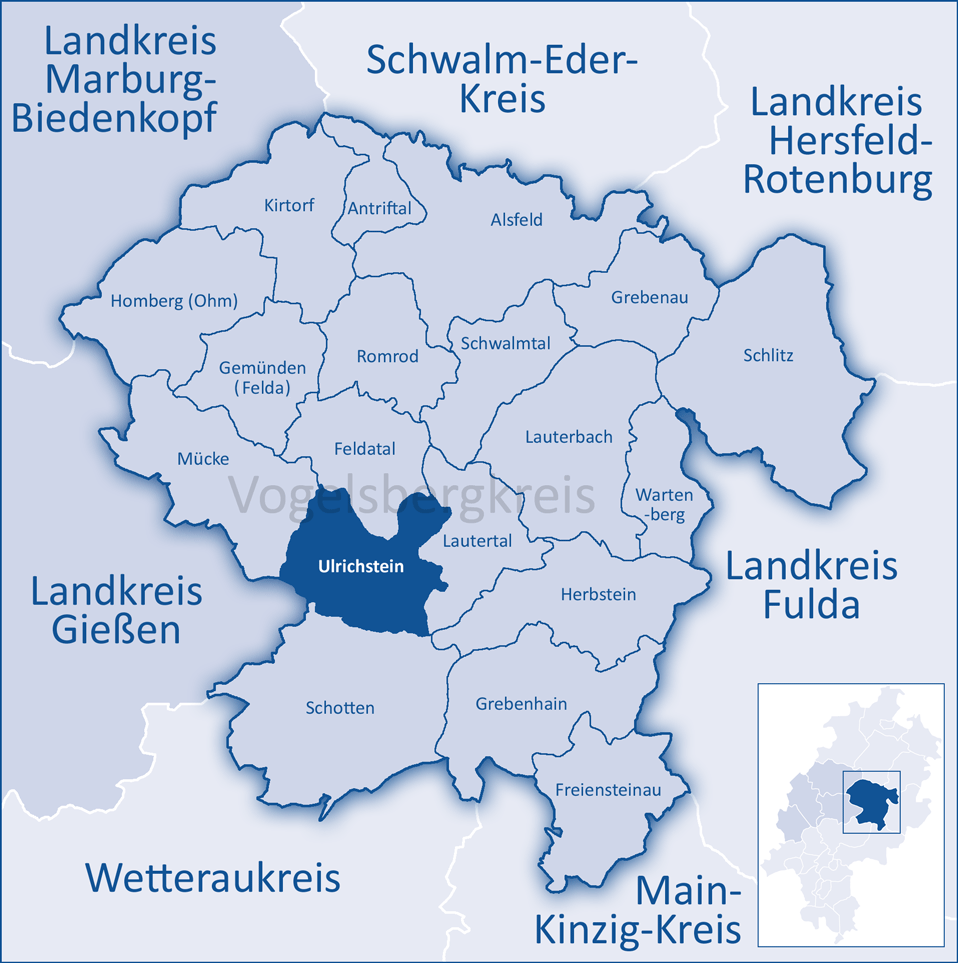
- Location of Ulrichstein within Vogelsbergkreis district
- Interactive map of Ulrichstein
- Location within Germany Location within Hesse
- Coordinates: 50°35′N 09°12′E
- Country: Germany
- State: Hesse
- Admin. region: Gießen
- District: Vogelsbergkreis

Government
  - Mayor (2023–29): Steffen Scharmann (Ind.)

Area
  - Total: 65.61 km^{2} (25.33 sq mi)
- Elevation: 614 m (2,014 ft)

Population (2025-12-31)
  - Total: 2,721
  - Density: 41.47/km^{2} (107.4/sq mi)
- Time zone: UTC+01:00 (CET)
  - Summer (DST): UTC+02:00 (CEST)
- Postal codes: 35327
- Dialling codes: 06645
- Vehicle registration: VB
- Website: www.ulrichstein.de

Ulrichstein (German pronunciation: [ˈʊlʁɪçˌʃtaɪn]) is a small town in the Vogelsbergkreis in Hesse, Germany.

== Geography ==
=== Location ===
Ulrichstein lies in the Vogelsberg Mountains 500 m above sea level and is thereby Hesse's highest town. It is a recognized state-approved climatic spa and lies near the High Hoherodskopf nature reserve

Northeast of town is the source of the river Ohm, the "Omquelle"

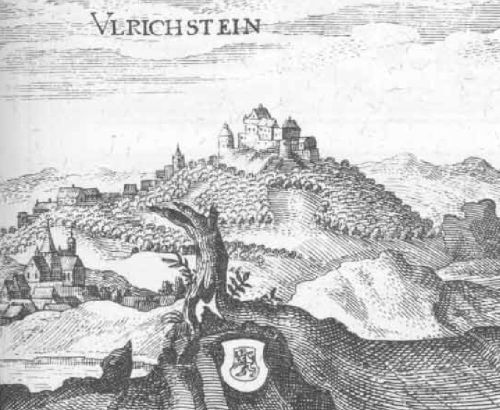
Excerpt from the Topographia Hassiae by Matthäus Merian, 1655

=== Neighboring municipalities ===
Ulrichstein borders in the north on the municipality of Feldatal, in the east on the municipality of Lautertal, in the south on the town of Schotten, in the southwest on the town of Laubach (Gießen district), and in the west on the municipality of Mücke.

=== Constituent municipalities ===
In 1972, the town of Ulrichstein and the municipalities of Kölzenhain, Feldkrücken and Rebgeshain from the Lauterbach district, along with the municipalities of Bobenhausen, Helpershain, Ober-Seibertenrod, Unter-Seibertenrod and Wohnfeld from the Alsfeld district merged into a new municipality, today's town of Ulrichstein.
