= Vogelsbergkreis =

Coordinates: 50°39′N 9°16′E

- District
- Flag Coat of arms
- Country: Germany
- State: Hesse
- Adm. region: Gießen
- Capital: Lauterbach

Government
  - District admin.: Manfred Görig (SPD)

Area
  - Total: 1,458.96 km^{2} (563.31 sq mi)

Population (31 December 2025)
  - Total: 100,723
  - Density: 69.0375/km^{2} (178.806/sq mi)
- Time zone: UTC+01:00 (CET)
  - Summer (DST): UTC+02:00 (CEST)
- Vehicle registration: VB
- Website: www.vogelsbergkreis.de

The Vogelsbergkreis is a Kreis (district) in the middle of Hesse, Germany. Neighbouring districts are Schwalm-Eder, Hersfeld-Rotenburg, Fulda, Main-Kinzig, Wetteraukreis, Gießen and Marburg-Biedenkopf.

== History ==
The district was created in 1972 by merging the former districts Alsfeld and Lauterbach.

== Geography ==
The main feature of the district is the Vogelsberg, an extinct volcano, last active 7 million years ago.

== Coat of arms ==
The lion in the bottom half is the lion of Hesse. The lilies in the upper part show the flowers of the martagon lily (German Türkenbund, Lilium martagon), a rare plant which grows in some protected areas of the district. The flowers were taken from the coat of arms of the Lauterbach district.

== Towns and municipalities ==
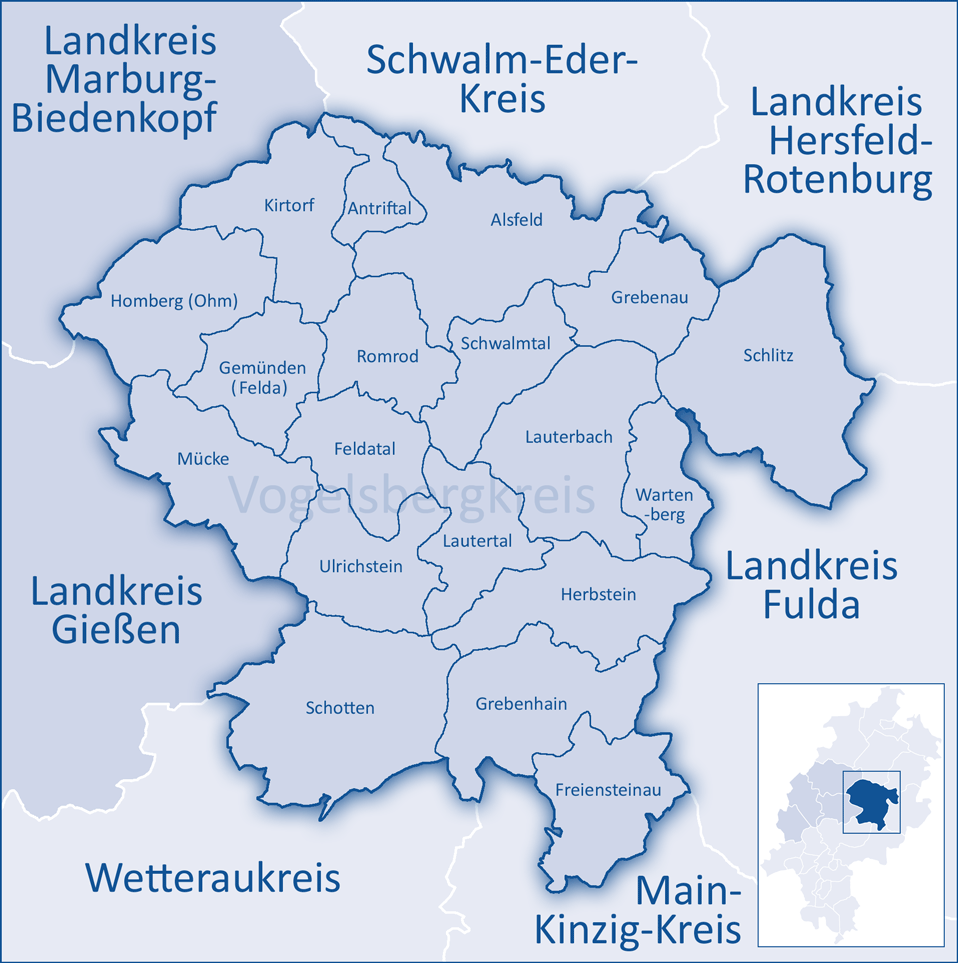
Clickable map of towns and municipalities in the district

Towns
1. Alsfeld
2. Grebenau
3. Herbstein
4. Homberg (Ohm)
5. Kirtorf
6. Lauterbach
7. Romrod
8. Schlitz
9. Schotten
10. Ulrichstein
Municipalities
1. Antrifttal
2. Feldatal
3. Freiensteinau
4. Gemünden
5. Grebenhain
6. Lautertal
7. Mücke
8. Schwalmtal
9. Wartenberg

Alsfeld by night

== Transport ==
Rhein-Main-Verkehrsverbund (RMV)

The district is located in the area of the public transport association Rhein-Main-Verkehrsverbund (RMV).
