= Holzbach (Schweinfe) =

River in Germany

Location
- Country: Germany
- States: Hesse

Physical characteristics
- Mouth
  - location: Schweinfe
  - coordinates: 50.9759°N 8.9675°E

Basin features
- Progression: Schweinfe→ Wohra→ Ohm→ Lahn→ Rhine→ North Sea

The Holzbach (German pronunciation: [ˈhɔlt͡sˌbax]) is a small river of Hesse, Germany. It is a right tributary of the Schweinfe in Gemünden.

During the construction of the Wohra Valley Railway from Gemünden to Kirchhain, the bed of the Holzbach was lowered in 1913/14 about 150 m south of the Gemünden station in order to be led under the railway embankment. This meant that the Holzbach also had to pass under the western arm of the Schweinfe, the Mühlbach, into which it had previously flowed. Since the lowering, it now flows about 80 m further east into the lower parallel arm of the Schweinfe, crossing the Holzbach via the Schweinfe aqueduct built at that time.

== See also ==
- List of rivers of Hesse
