= Josbach =

River in Germany

Location
- Country: Germany
- State: Hesse

Physical characteristics
- Mouth
  - location: Wohra
  - coordinates: 50.9081°N 8.9467°E
- Length: 10.6 km (6.6 mi)

Basin features
- Progression: Wohra→ Ohm→ Lahn→ Rhine→ North Sea

The Josbach is a river of Hesse, Germany. It flows into the Wohra near Halsdorf.

The Josbach rises at a height of 380 m in the meadows on the western slope of the Lohberg (428 m) near the Rhine-Weser watershed in the municipality of Gilserberg, about 1 km north of Winterscheid. The federal highway B 3 runs about 200 m northwest of the source.

== See also ==
- List of rivers of Hesse
