= Erksdorf =

- District of Stadtallendorf
- Location in Hesse Erksdorf (Germany)
- Coordinates: 50°51′31″N 09°01′22″E
- Country: Germany
- State: Hesse
- District: Marburg-Biedenkopf
- Town: Stadtallendorf

Area
  - Total: 10.89 km^{2} (4.20 sq mi)
- Elevation: 258 m (846 ft)

Population
  - Total: 1,000
- Postal code: 35260
- Area code: 06428

Erksdorf is a district of the town of Stadtallendorf in the Marburg-Biedenkopf district of central Hesse, Germany. Formerly an independent municipality, it was incorporated into Stadtallendorf on 31 December 1971.

== Geography ==
Erksdorf lies north of central Stadtallendorf in the West Hesse Depression. State road 3290 runs through the village from north to south, while district road 15, connecting Kirchhain and Momberg, runs from east to west.

== History ==
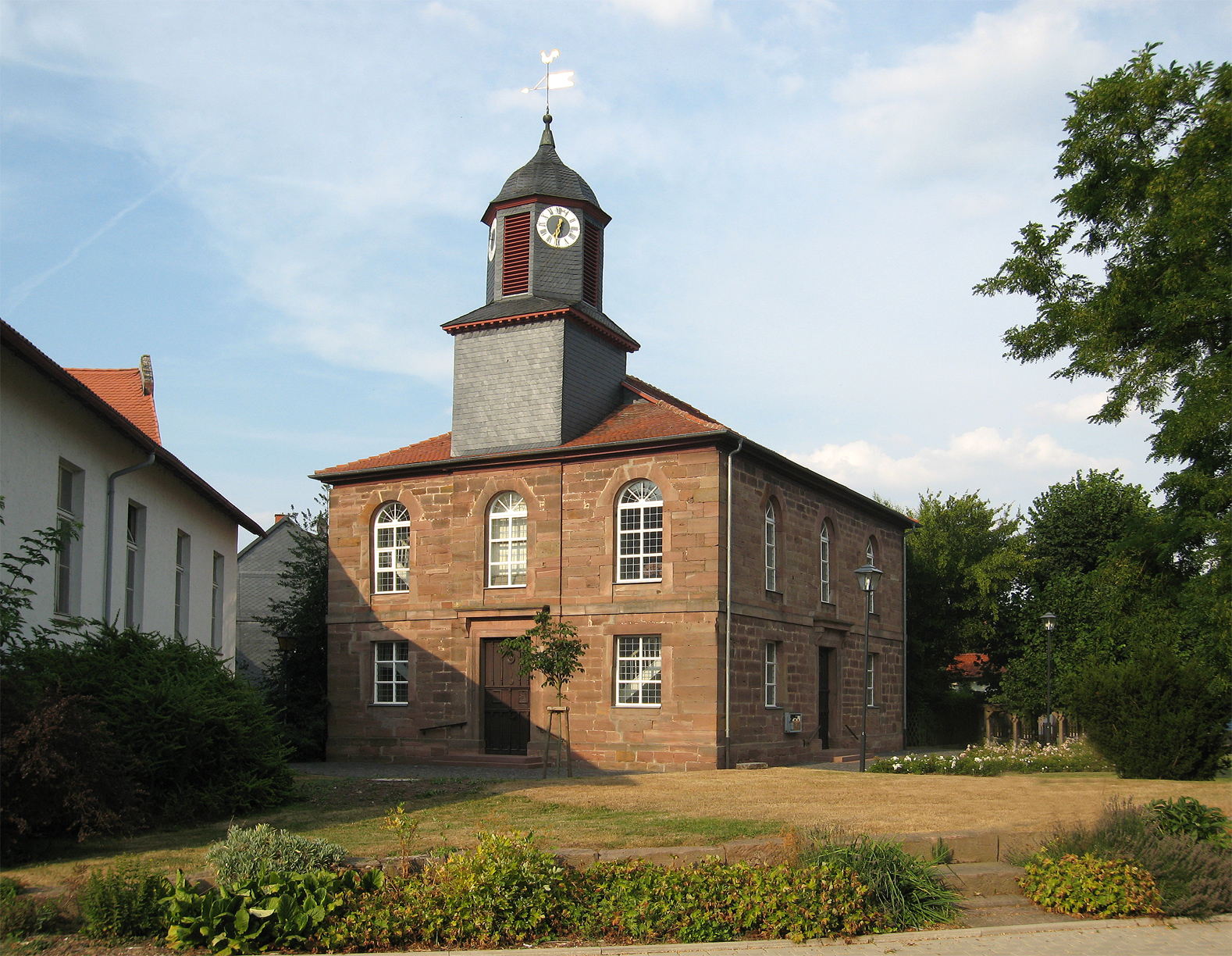
The church in Erksdorf

The area around Erksdorf has been settled since ancient times, and its first settlement is believed to have occurred between the 4th and 8th centuries AD. The earliest known written reference to Erksdorf appears in a document of Haina Abbey dating from between 1205 and 1216.

The village's name is traditionally derived from an early settler named Ercanger. Its recorded forms developed from Ereksdorf through Erkerßdorff to the modern Erksdorf. The Protestant church in the center of the village was built in 1831.

Historically, Erksdorf formed part of the Landgraviate of Hesse and, following its division in 1567, the Landgraviate of Hesse-Marburg. After the Hessian War, the area became part of Hesse-Kassel in 1648. From 1807 to 1813 it belonged to the Kingdom of Westphalia, after which it returned to the Electorate of Hesse. In 1866, following the Austro-Prussian War, the electorate was annexed by the Kingdom of Prussia, and Erksdorf became part of the Prussian Province of Hesse-Nassau.

After the Second World War, Erksdorf was located in the American occupation zone and became part of the newly created state of Greater Hesse, later renamed Hesse. It subsequently became part of West Germany in 1949 and remained so until German reunification in 1990.

On 31 December 1971, during the territorial reform of Hesse, the formerly independent municipality of Erksdorf voluntarily merged into the town then officially known as Allendorf, now Stadtallendorf. Erksdorf was subsequently established as an Ortsbezirk (local district) within the town.

== Demographics ==
According to the 2011 German census, Erksdorf had 906 inhabitants on 9 May 2011. Of these, 27 (3.0%) were foreign nationals. There were 159 residents under the age of 18, 393 aged 18 to 49, 201 aged 50 to 64, and 153 aged 65 or older.

The population lived in 375 households, including 93 single-person households, 111 couples without children, 120 couples with children, 39 single-parent households, and 12 shared households. Fifty-four households consisted exclusively of senior citizens, while 264 contained no senior citizens.

Historical population figures include 666 inhabitants in 1834; 646 in 1840; 628 in 1846; 667 in 1905; 935 in 1946; 933 in 1950; and 722 in 1961.

Historically, the population was predominantly Protestant. In 1861, Erksdorf had 586 Lutheran and 40 Jewish residents. In 1885, 636 residents (97.4%) were Protestant, one was Roman Catholic, and 16 (2.45%) were Jewish. In 1961, 686 residents (95.01%) were Protestant and 29 (4.02%) were Roman Catholic.

== Government ==
Erksdorf constitutes an Ortsbezirk under the Hessian municipal system, encompassing the territory of the former municipality. It has a seven-member local advisory council (Ortsbeirat) and a local head (Ortsvorsteher).

In the 2021 Hessian local elections, turnout for the Erksdorf local council election was 51.25%. All candidates belonged to the Bürgerliste Erksdorf (Erksdorf Citizens' List).

== Infrastructure ==
Erksdorf has a primary school, several playgrounds, a barbecue hut, a sports field, and a community center. Public transportation is provided by a municipal bus connection to central Stadtallendorf.

== Notable people ==
- Heinrich Hohl (1900–1968), farmer and politician (CNBL, later CDU), member of the Bundestag and mayor of the formerly independent municipality of Erksdorf; born and died in Erksdorf
- Eike Immel (born 1960), former German international football goalkeeper
