= Gemünden (Felda) =

- Municipality
- Coat of arms

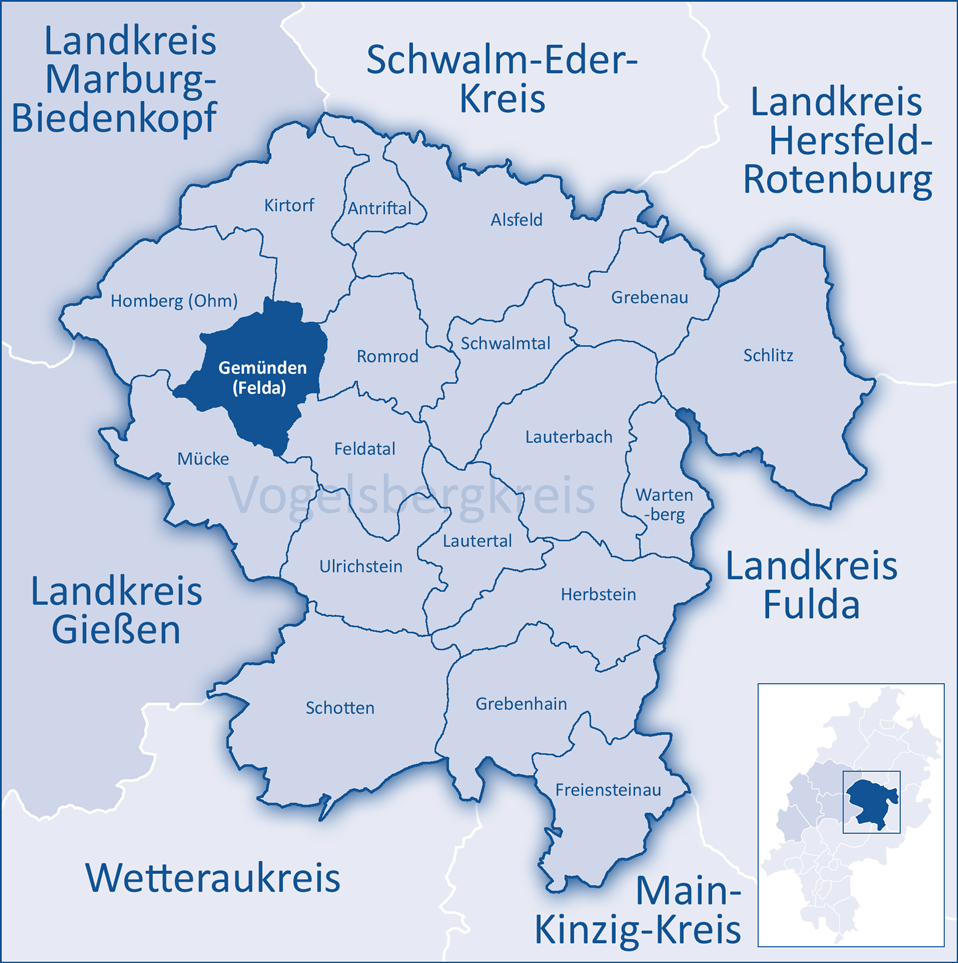
- Location of Gemünden within Vogelsbergkreis district
- Interactive map of Gemünden
- Location within Germany Location within Hesse
- Coordinates: 50°42′N 09°03′E
- Country: Germany
- State: Hesse
- Admin. region: Gießen
- District: Vogelsbergkreis

Government
  - Mayor (2021–27): Daniel Müller

Area
  - Total: 55 km^{2} (21 sq mi)
- Elevation: 259 m (850 ft)

Population (2025-12-31)
  - Total: 2,595
  - Density: 47/km^{2} (120/sq mi)
- Time zone: UTC+01:00 (CET)
  - Summer (DST): UTC+02:00 (CEST)
- Postal codes: 35329
- Dialling codes: 06634
- Vehicle registration: VB
- Website: www.gemünden-felda.de

Gemünden (German pronunciation: [ɡəˈmʏndn̩]) is a municipality in the Vogelsbergkreis in Hesse, Germany.

== Geography ==
=== Location ===
Gemünden lies on the rivers Felda and Ohm, flowing from the Vogelsberg Mountains in the region of Upper Hessen (Oberhessen) amongst Homberg Grünberg, Kirtorf, Romrod and Feldatal, or more broadly, between Gießen and Bad Hersfeld. Through the rural areas within the municipality runs the Autobahn A 5

=== Neighbouring municipalities ===
Gemuenden borders in the northwest on the town of Homberg, in the northeast on the town of Kirtorf, in the east on the town of Romrod, in the southeast on the municipality of Feldatal, and in the southwest on the municipality of Mücke.

=== Constituent municipalities ===
The municipality of Gemünden consists of 7 centres that were amalgamated as part of municipal reforms in 1971 into one greater municipality. These are:

- Burg-Gemünden
- Ehringshausen
- Elpenrod
- Hainbach
- Nieder-Gemünden (administrative seat)
- Otterbach
- Rülfenrod

== Politics ==
=== Municipal council ===
The municipal elections on 16 April 2026 yielded the following results:

- BGG (citizens' coalition): 7 seats
- UBL (citizens' coalition): 5 seats
- SPD: 8 seats
