= Homberg (Ohm) =

- Town
- Flag Coat of arms

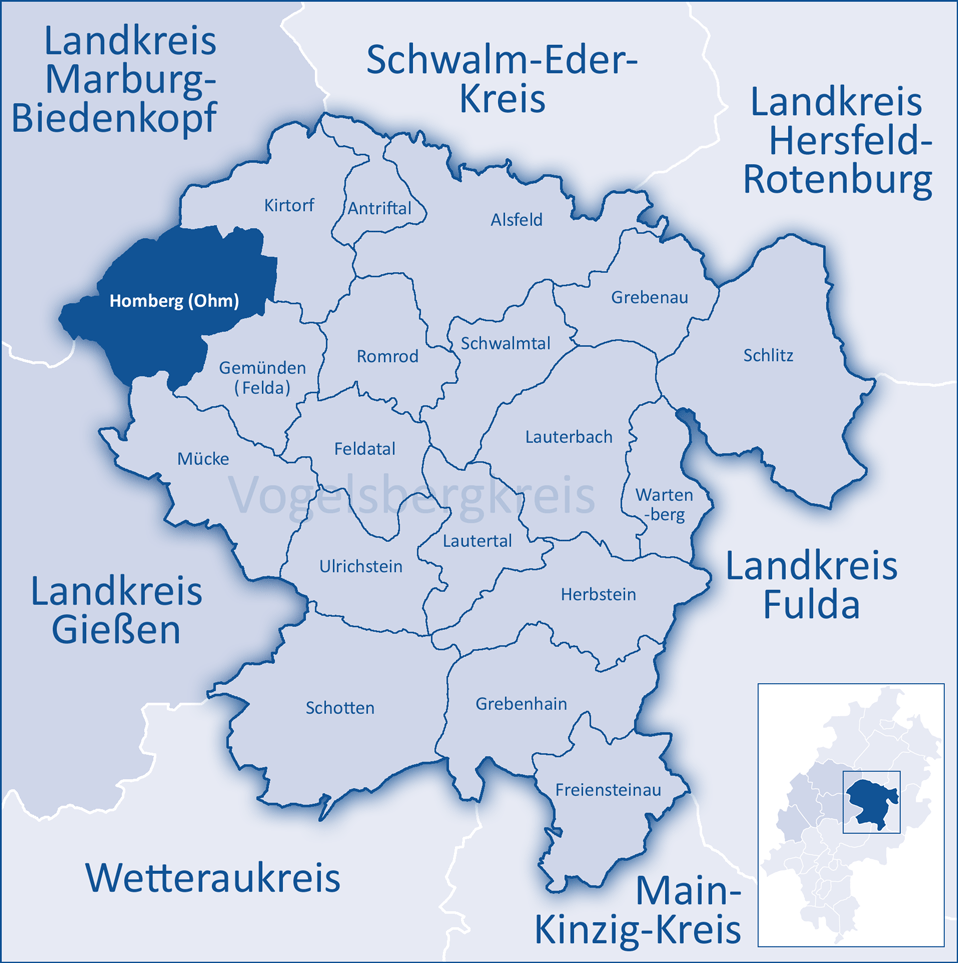
- Location of Homberg within Vogelsbergkreis district
- Interactive map of Homberg
- Location within Germany Location within Hesse
- Coordinates: 50°43′N 9°0′E
- Country: Germany
- State: Hesse
- Admin. region: Gießen
- District: Vogelsbergkreis
- Subdivisions: 14 Stadtbezirke

Government
  - Mayor (2022–28): Simke Ried

Area
  - Total: 88.04 km^{2} (33.99 sq mi)
- Elevation: 288 m (945 ft)

Population (2025-12-31)
  - Total: 6,972
  - Density: 79.19/km^{2} (205.1/sq mi)
- Time zone: UTC+01:00 (CET)
  - Summer (DST): UTC+02:00 (CEST)
- Postal codes: 35315
- Dialling codes: 06633
- Vehicle registration: VB
- Website: www.homberg-ohm.de

Homberg (Ohm) (German pronunciation: [ˈhɔmbɛʁk]) is a town in the Vogelsbergkreis in Hesse, Germany.

== Geography ==
=== Location ===
The officially recognized climatic spa of Homberg lies from 203 to 350 m above sea level in the valley of the Ohm, a tributary to the Lahn, some 19 km southeast of Marburg.

=== Neighbouring municipalities ===
Homberg borders in the north on the town of Stadtallendorf (Marburg-Biedenkopf), in the northeast on the town of Kirtorf, in the southeast on the municipality of Gemünden, in the south on the municipality of Mücke, in the southwest on the town of Grünberg and the municipality of Rabenau (both in Gießen district), in the west on the municipality of Ebsdorfergrund, and in the northwest on the town of Amöneburg (both in Marburg-Biedenkopf).

=== Constituent municipalities ===
The town of Homberg consists of not only the namesake main town, but also of the outlying centres of Appenrod, Bleidenrod, Büßfeld, Dannenrod, Deckenbach, Erbenhausen, Gontershausen, Haarhausen, Höingen, Maulbach, Nieder-Ofleiden, Ober-Ofleiden and Schadenbach.

== Politics ==
=== Town council ===
The municipal elections held on 26 March 2006 yielded the following results:

- SPD 11 seats
- CDU 10 seats
- FWG (citizens' coalition) 5 seats
- FDP 1 seats

=== Coat of arms ===
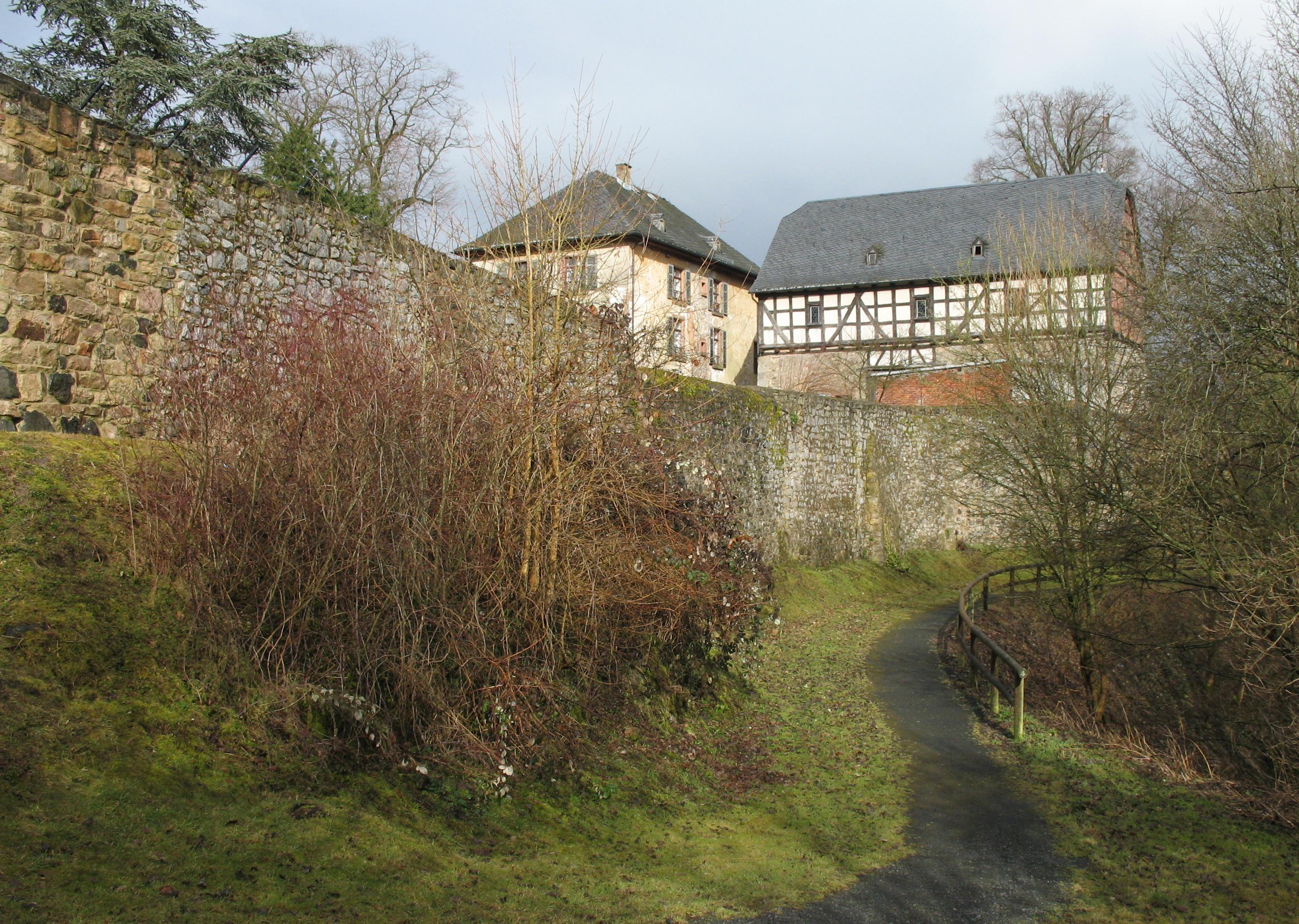
Castle

Homberg's oldest known seal dates back to 1234, even before the town was granted town rights. Until the 16th century, the town's arms generally showed a castle or town wall with the red-and-silver-striped Lion of Hessen, and in 1536, a new version suddenly showed the lion "sinister" – facing left (from the arms bearer's point of view). The arms in use today, which were adopted in the late 19th century, are based on this version.

=== Town partnerships ===
The town of Homberg maintains partnerships with the following places:

- Thouaré-sur-Loire, near Nantes, France, since 1981
- (Germany) Stadtroda, Thuringia, since 1990

== Transportation ==
Homberg lies in the area of the Rhein-Main-Verkehrsverbund (Rhine-Main Transport Network). The busline 5332 of the Kurhessen Regional Transport system connects Homberg with the nearest railway stations at Burg- and Nieder Gemünden on the Vogelsbergbahn railway line and Kirchhain on the Main-Weser line. The busline VB-71 run by the Verkehrsgesellschaft Oberhessen (Upper Hessen Transport Company) also goes to Gemünden, and line VB-13a offers a direct connection to Alsfeld railway station.

The Ohmtalbahn, which runs through Homberg (Burg- and Nieder Gemünden–Kirchhain) is nowadays only partly in service beginning at Nieder-Ofleiden, and only then for goods trains that serve a basalt quarry.

The Homberg (Ohm) interchange on Autobahn A 5 lies about 10 km south of the town core, while 8 km to the north runs Federal Highway (Bundesstraße) 62.
