= Klein (Ohm) =

River in Germany

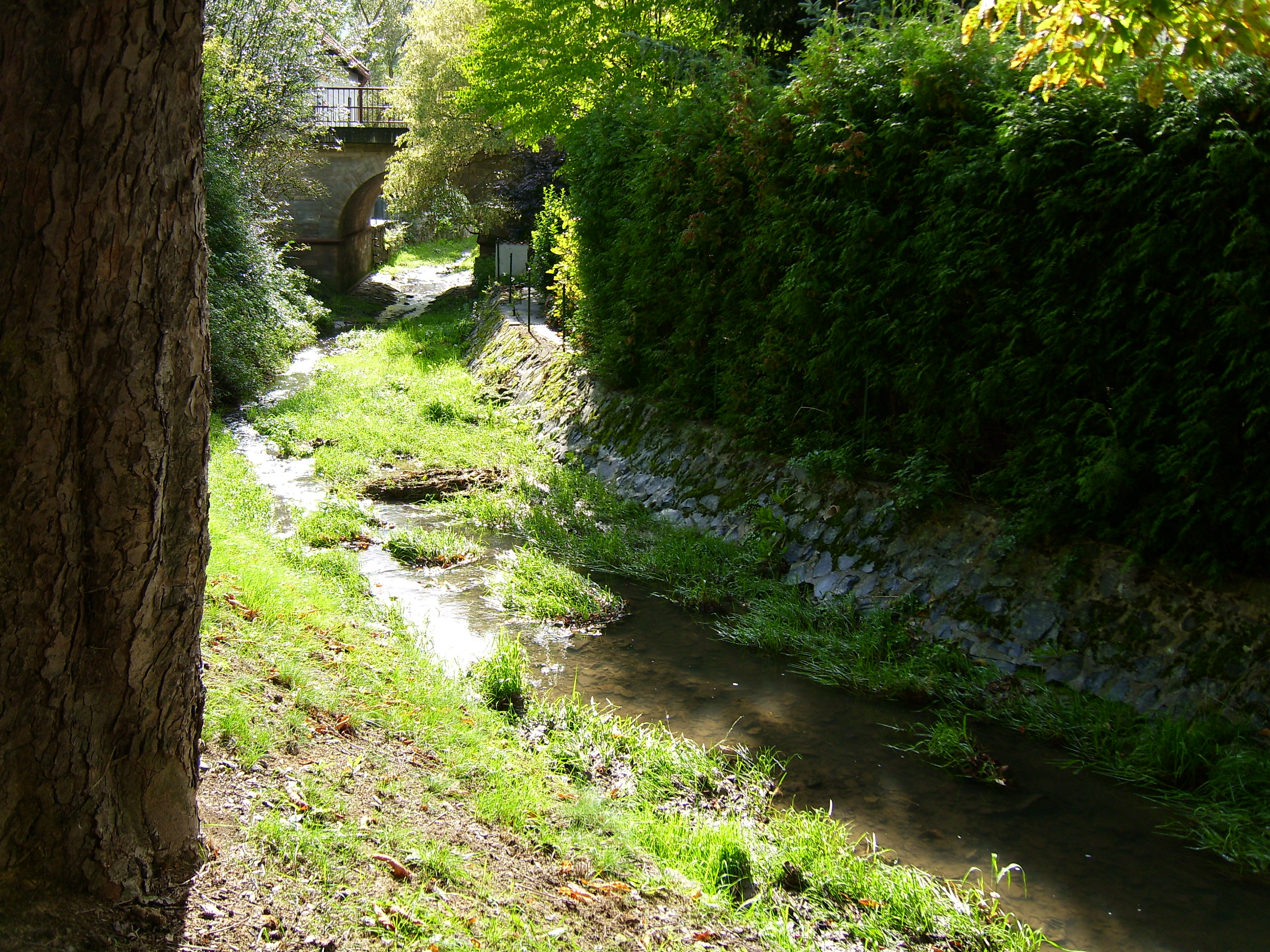

Location
- Country: Germany
- State: Hesse

Physical characteristics
- Mouth
  - location: Ohm
  - coordinates: 50.8065°N 8.9351°E
- Length: 23.2 km (14.4 mi)

Basin features
- Progression: Ohm→ Lahn→ Rhine→ North Sea

Klein is a river of Hesse, Germany. It flows into the Ohm near Amöneburg.

== See also ==
- List of rivers of Hesse
