= Schweinfe =

River of Hesse, Germany

Location
- Country: Germany
- State: Hesse

Physical characteristics
- Mouth
  - location: Wohra
  - coordinates: 50.9749°N 8.9678°E
- Length: 13.4 km (8.3 mi)

Basin features
- Progression: Wohra→ Ohm→ Lahn→ Rhine→ North Sea

Schweinfe (German pronunciation: [ˈʃvaɪnfə]) is a river of Hesse, Germany. It flows into the Wohra in Gemünden.

== See also ==
- List of rivers of Hesse
