= Rotes Wasser =

Rotes Wasser may refer to:

- Rotes Wasser (Ohm), a river of Hesse, Germany, tributary of the Ohm
- Rotes Wasser (Müglitz), a river of Saxony, Germany, tributary of the Müglitz
