= Transformatorenhäuschen (Anzefahr) =

Coordinates: 50.846233°N 8.863896°E

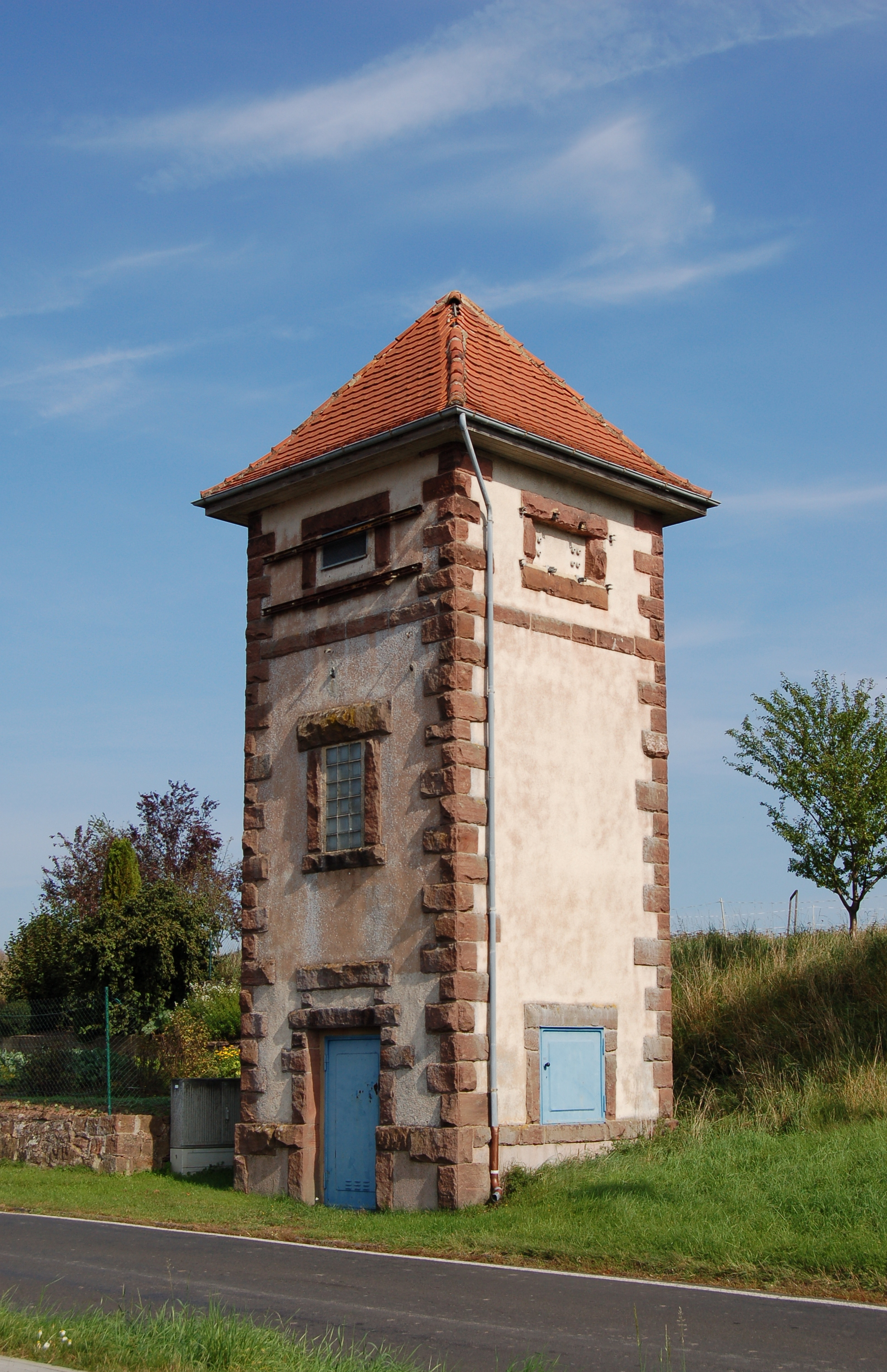
Transformatorenhäuschen in 2011

The Transformatorenhäuschen (literally ‘little transformer house’) is a former electrical distribution substation on the Sindersfelder Straße in Anzefahr, a borough of the Hessian city of Kirchhain in Marburg-Biedenkopf district.

The tower-like building was erected during the first quarter of the 20th century and connected Anzefahr to the power grid. Built from brick, the Transformatorenhäuschen is plastered. Both the corners and window cutouts feature sandstone.

As a “witness of the beginning of electrification in rural areas” („als Zeuge für den Beginn der Elektrifizierung auf dem Lande“), the Transformatorenhäuschen is protected as a cultural heritage monument.

== Literature ==
- Helmuth K. Stoffers: Kulturdenkmäler in Hessen: Landkreis Marburg-Biedenkopf 1. Gemeinden Amöneburg, Kirchhain, Neustadt und Stadtallendorf. Published by the Landesamt für Denkmalpflege Hessen. Konrad Theiss Verlag, 2002. ISBN 978-3-8062-1651-6, S. 249.
