= Eberhard Werner Happel =

German author, novelist, journalist and polymath (1647–1690)

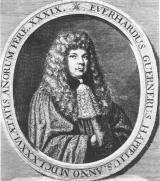
Eberhard Werner Happel

Eberhard Werner Happel (12 August 1647 in Kirchhain – 15 May 1690 in Hamburg) was a German writer, novelist, journalist and scholar who specialized in multiple disciplines.

Happel wrote fiction and nonfiction. He included many aspects of contemporary knowledge in his many works which therefore had an encyclopaedic form and dealt with historical and current political themes, compilations of anecdotes about famous people past and present, descriptions of exotic regions, and popular treatises on natural science.

== Works ==
- Der asiatische Onogambo. 1673
- Sogenannter christlicher Potentaten Kriegsroman. 2 volumes, 1681
- Der insulanische Mandorell. 1682
- Der ungarische Kriegsroman. 6 volumes, 1685-1697
- Der italienische Spinelli oder so genannte Europäische Geschicht-Romans auf das 1685. 4 volumes, 1685–1686
- Der spanische Quintana oder so genannte Europäische Geschicht-Roman auf das 1686. 4 volumes, 1686–1687
- Der französische Cormantin oder so genannte Europäische Geschicht-Roman auf das 1687. 4 volumes, 1687–1688
- Everhardi Guerneri Happelii Mundus Mirabilis Tripartitus, Oder Wunderbare Welt, in einer kurtzen Cosmographia. 3 volumes, 1687–1689
- Der ottomanische Bajazet oder so genannte Europäische Geschicht-Roman auf das 1688. 4 volumes, 1688–1689
- Afrikanischer Tarnolast. 1689
- Der teutsche Carl oder so genannte Europäische Geschicht-Roman auf das 1689. 4 volumes, 1690
- Der Academische Roman, worinnen das Studenten-Leben fürgebildet wird. hrsg. G. E. Scholz, Wien 1962 (Repr. d. Ausg. Ulm 1690)

== Bibliography ==
- Habel, Thomas (2013). "William Ernst Tentzel as a Precursor of Learned Journalism in Germany: Monatliche Unterredungen and Curieuse Bibliothec". In Holenstein, André; Steinke, Hubert; Stuber, Martin (eds.). Scholars in Action: The Practice of Knowledge and Figure of the Savant in the 18th Century (PDF). Brill. pp. 289–318. ISBN 978-90-04-24390-3. JSTOR 10.1163/j.ctv1sr6k3v.18.
- Tatlock, Lynne (1995). "Eberhard Werner Happel's Turcica (1683—1690)" (PDF). Colloquia Germanica. 28 (3/4): 307–335. JSTOR 23980689.
