= Johann Georg Estor =

German public law theorist and historian

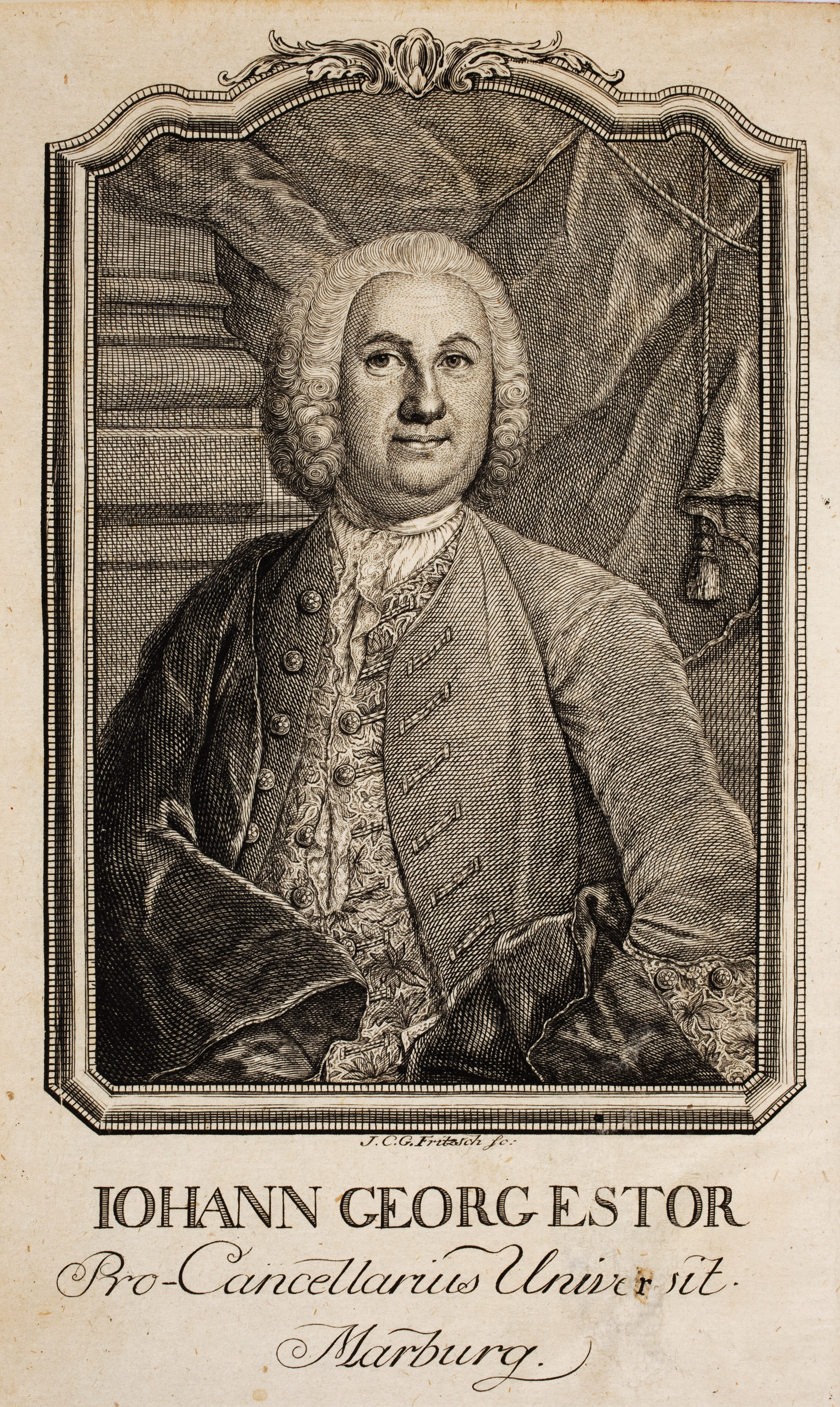
Engraving of Johann Georg Estor

Johann Georg Estor

Johann Georg Estor (6 June 1699 – 25 October 1773), was a German theorist of public law, historian and book collector.

== Life ==
Estor was born in Schweinsberg (now part of Stadtallendorf, Hesse) and educated at the universities of Gießen, Halle, and Jena. He became professor of history and law first in Giessen, then in Jena. He moved to the University of Marburg in 1742. As professor in Giessen he learned natural history from his colleague Joahnn Melchior Verdrieß and became national geographer of the county of Hessen-Darmstadt. In this time (around 1730) he came in contact with the famous geographer and physicist Johann Jakob Scheuchzer.

Estor died in Marburg in 1773, and was buried in his native Schweinsberg.

== Work ==
The reason for Estor's aversion to the Roman Law is certainly his strong democratic inclination. In his early work Auserlesene kleine Schrifften there are several articles by himself and by other authors in which it is proven that the bondage of the peasants, which was in practise at his time, meant nothing more or less than slavery. One article deals with the fate and status of the slaves in ancient Rome and here parallels become evident.

One of his most impressive works is Freiheit der teutschen Kirchen, where he describes the constant struggle between the Roman-German emperors and the popes since the Pope Gregory VII. in the 11th century. In contrast to the popes the Roman-German emperors had no absolute power and the highest authority in the Holy Roman Empire was not the emperor, the Kaiser, but the Reichsversammlung (Imperial Assembly), especially its most prominent members, the "Kurfürsten" (Electors) whose task was to elect the Kaiser. So the constitution of the Holy Roman Empire was democratic in a wider sense in contrary to the ancient Roman Empire, which was autocratic and where the princeps or Imperator Augustus possessed absolute power. Estor illustrates this fact in "Neue kleine Schriften", Vol. 1 page 526 by describing the controversy about the Chapter 5 of the "Aurea Bulla", the constitution of the Holy Roman Empire. A large number of public law teachers of Estor's time, who were adherents of the Roman Law, thought that the authors of this constitution must have been insane, because this chapter deals with the case, when the Kaiser is discharged and is going to be accused of a crime. These romanists thought that the impeachment of an emperor had to be considered as a contradictio in adiecto, a contradiction in itself. But to Estor's point of view this chapter 5 was typical for the democratic character of the Holy Roman Empire and for the role of the Kaiser as the first Representative of the Reichsversammlung.
Very interesting is, what Estor says in "Freiheit der teutschen Kirchen" about Pope Gregory VII. Contrary to the legend, that this powerful pope stemmed from the noble family Aldobrandeschi, Estor claims, that he was the son of a blacksmith in Saona in the Italian county of Toscana and that his full name was Hildebrand Bonizi. Apparently he was completely different from his father, a small and tiny person. His father forced him in his youth to cut wood for the fire, which Hildebrand hated as hell. So he decided to become a prominent and powerful person. In the Germany of the 11th century he was called later "Pabst Hildebrand Höllenbrand" (Hildebrand Hellfire). Estors version of Hildebrands origin is much more probable than the legend mentioned above, because Estors arguments are based on a whole library, as is mentioned in the foreword of his "Freiheit ..".

== Discovery of the Sprites (lightning) ==
In the second volume of his "neue kleine Schriften", pages 195/6, there is a little note, in which Estor says that he had explored the landscapes of Hessen-Darmstadt on horseback or walking to accomplish a book about the national geography of this county. This was in the years around 1730. His teachers Verdrieß and Johann Jakob Scheuchzer had given him a hint, to make observations "coelo tristi" (in a sad sky).

So, following this hint, he one day went uphill one of the highest mountains in the Vogelsberg near Burgharts, called "the saddle", through a thundercloud. In the middle of the cloud he felt little water droplets on his skin like dew. And as he had reached the top of the mountain, he saw the blue sky above him and the cloud beneath like a white sea, from which flashes mounted as well directly up into the sky (sprite (lightning)) and shot down to the earth.

== Bibliography ==

- Origines Iuris publici Hassiaci, Gießen 1729
- Many and important contributions to: Johann Philipp Kuchenbecker: Analecta Hassiaca, Marburg, 1728–1740.
- Auserlesene kleine Schrifften, 3 volumes, Giessen, several editions since 1735 each edition different from the other.
- Marburgische Beiträge zur Gelehrsamkeit nebst den Neuigkeiten der Universitäten Marburg und Rinteln. Marburg 1749-1750 (5 vols.)
- Estor, Johann Georg / Kehr, Kurt (1979): Marburgische Beiträge zur Gelehrsamkeit 1749/50. In: alma mater philippina, Wintersemester 1978/79, pp. 24–26.
- Die bürgerliche Rechtsgelehrsamkeit der Teutschen, Marburg, (since 1757), 3 volumes
- Neue kleine Schriften, 2 volumes, Marburg 1761
- Freiheit der teutschen Kirchen. Frankfurt 1766
- Discusses several works by Estor from throughout his career: Wilder, Colin F. Property and the German Idea of Freedom. From the End of the Thirty Years' War to the Eve of the French Revolution. Leiden: Brill, 2024.
