= Heinrich Hohl =

German politician (1900–1968)

Member of the Bundestag
- In office 3 November 1949 – 7 September 1953

Personal details
- Born: 19 January 1900
- Died: 29 December 1968 (aged 68) Erksdorf, Hesse, West Germany
- Party: CDU

Heinrich Hohl (January 19, 1900 – December 29, 1968) was a German politician of the Christian Democratic Union (CDU) and former member of the German Bundestag.

== Life ==
Hohl joined the CDU in 1946 and since then has served as mayor of the community of Erksdorf. He was a member of the German Bundestag from November 3, 1949, when he succeeded Werner Hilpert as deputy, until the end of the first legislative period in 1953. He had entered parliament via the Landesliste Hessen.

== Literature ==
Herbst, Ludolf; Jahn, Bruno (2002). Vierhaus, Rudolf (ed.). Biographisches Handbuch der Mitglieder des Deutschen Bundestages. 1949–2002 [Biographical Handbook of the Members of the German Bundestag. 1949–2002] (in German). München: De Gruyter - De Gruyter Saur. p. 1715. ISBN 978-3-11-184511-1.
