= Felda (Ohm) =

River in Germany

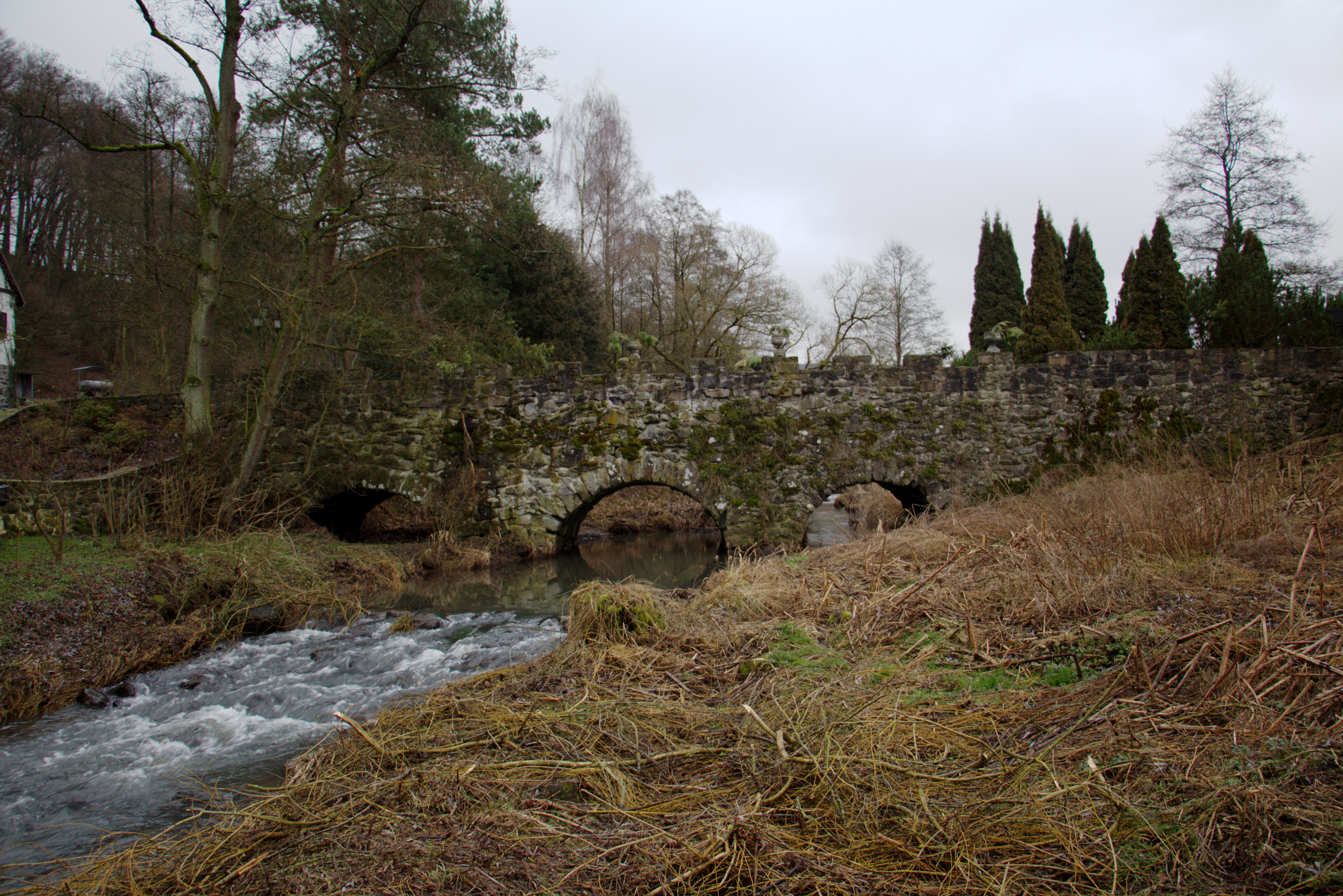

Location
- Country: Germany
- State: Hesse

Physical characteristics
- Mouth
  - location: Ohm
  - coordinates: 50.6961°N 9.0465°E
- Length: 30.0 km (18.6 mi)
- Basin size: 107 km^{2} (41 sq mi)

Basin features
- Progression: Ohm→ Lahn→ Rhine→ North Sea

Felda (German pronunciation: [ˈfɛlda]) is a river of Hesse, Germany. It flows into the Ohm near Gemünden.

== See also ==
- List of rivers of Hesse
