= Stadtallendorf =

- Town
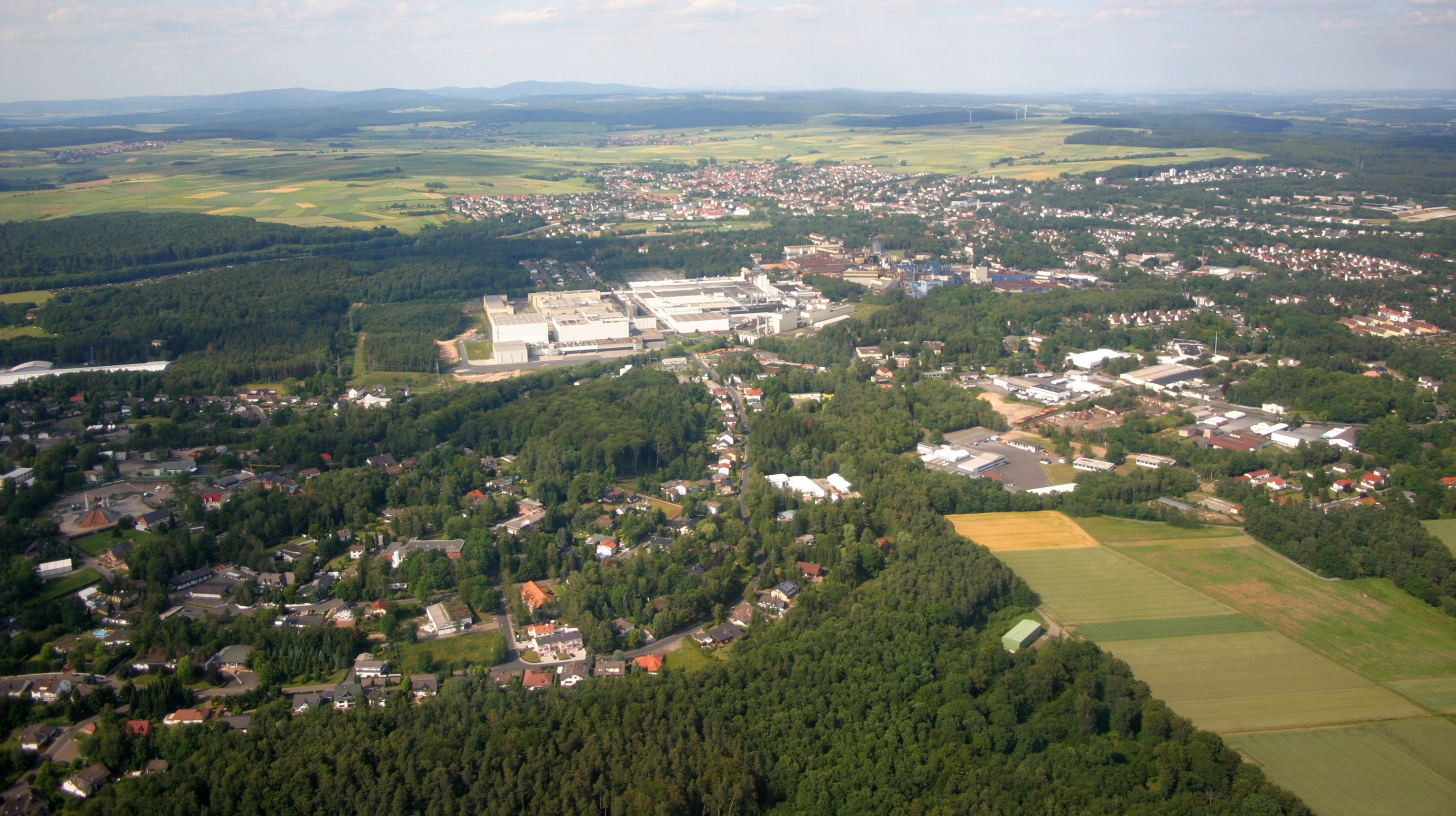
- Aerial view

- Coat of arms

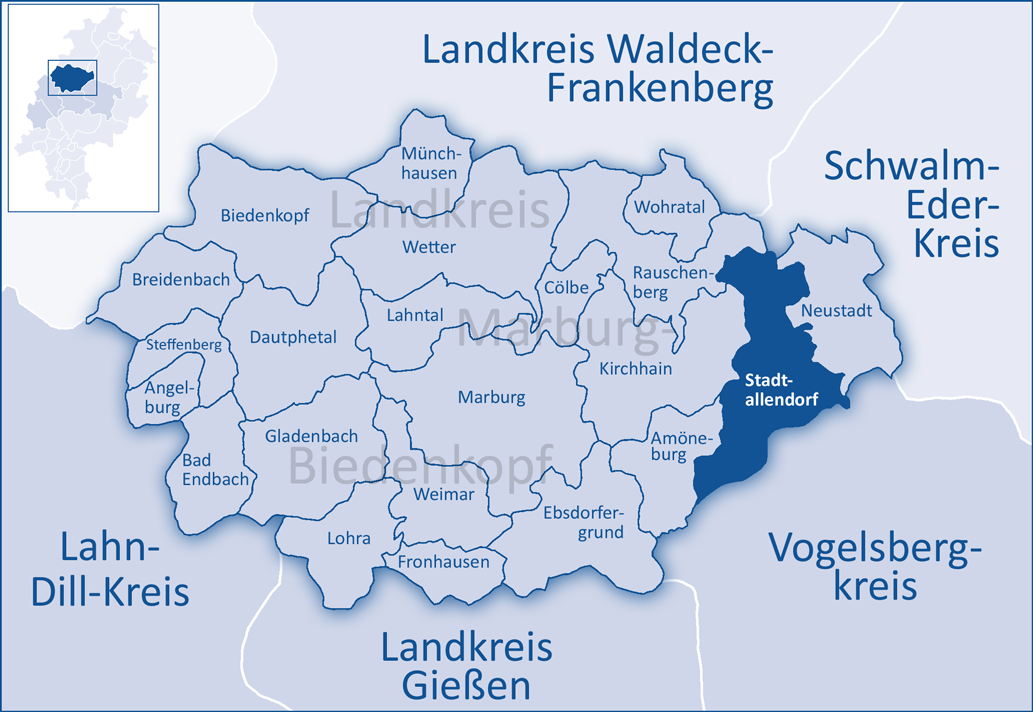
- Location of Stadtallendorf within Marburg-Biedenkopf district
- Interactive map of Stadtallendorf
- Location within Germany Location within Hesse
- Coordinates: 50°50′N 09°01′E
- Country: Germany
- State: Hesse
- Admin. region: Gießen
- District: Marburg-Biedenkopf

Government
  - Mayor (2023–29): Christian Somogyi (CDU)

Area
  - Total: 78.24 km^{2} (30.21 sq mi)
- Elevation: 256 m (840 ft)

Population (2025-12-31)
  - Total: 21,291
  - Density: 272.1/km^{2} (704.8/sq mi)
- Time zone: UTC+01:00 (CET)
  - Summer (DST): UTC+02:00 (CEST)
- Postal codes: 35260
- Dialling codes: 06428
- Vehicle registration: MR
- Website: www.stadtallendorf.de

Stadtallendorf (German pronunciation: [ˌʃtatˈʔaləndɔʁf]) is a town in the district of Marburg-Biedenkopf, Hesse, Germany. It lies about 18 km (11 miles) east of Marburg. In 2010, the town hosted the 50th Hessentag state festival.

== Geography ==
=== Location ===
Under the German system of Naturräume, Stadtallendorf lies in the West Hesse Depression zone (westhessische Senkenzone) which is divided into basins and ridges. With respect to these, the town lies on the Upper Hesse Ridge which separates the Amöneburg Basin in the west from the Schwalmbecken (another basin) in the east. On this ridge may also be found the Neustadt Saddle, abutted by the town's northeast edge. This upland is part of the divide between the Rhine and Weser watersheds.

=== Neighbouring municipalities ===
Stadtallendorf borders in the north on the town of Rauschenberg (Marburg-Biedenkopf) and the municipality of Gilserberg (Schwalm-Eder-Kreis), in the east on the town of Neustadt, in the southeast on the town of Kirtorf, in the south on the town of Homberg (Ohm) (both in the Vogelsbergkreis), and in the west on the towns of Amöneburg and Kirchhain (both in Marburg-Biedenkopf).

=== Constituent municipalities (Ortsteile) ===
- Niederklein
- Schweinsberg (an der Ohm)
- Erksdorf – This village of 1,000 inhabitants was amalgamated in the 1970s; the name comes from a long-ago settler named Eric von Erkersdorp.
- Hatzbach
- Wolferode

== History ==
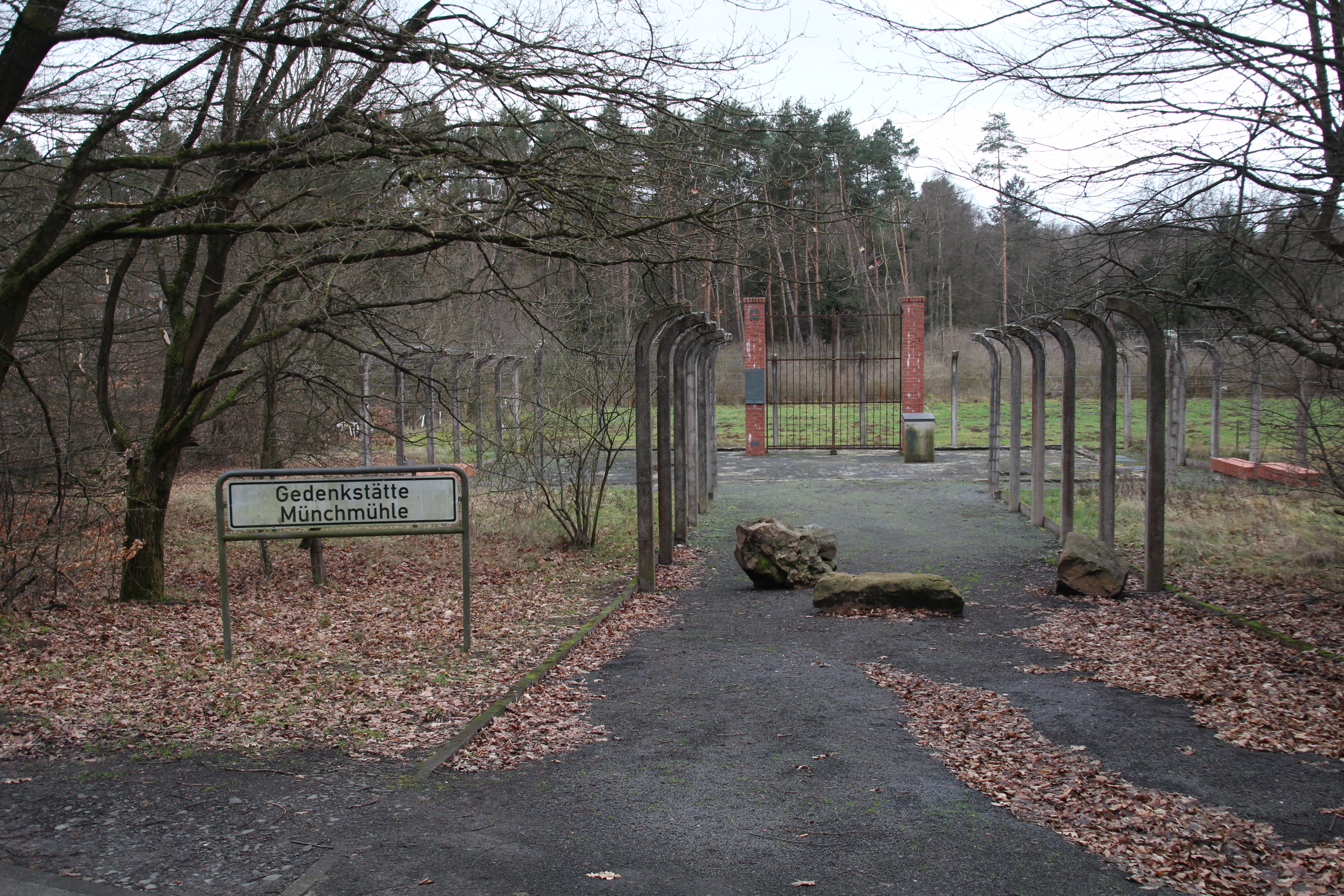
Memorial of the camp „KZ-Außenlager Münchmühle“

Stadtallendorf was given city rights in 1960; it had been known until then simply as Allendorf.

During World War II, Stadtallendorf was a secret munitions centre. The armament firms WASAG (Westfälisch-Anhaltische Sprengstoff Actien-Gesellschaft, "Westphalian & Anhaltish Explosives A.G.") and DAG produced munitions and explosives in two separate large facilities located in the woods nearby. At the time, it was one of the largest of all munitions production centres in Europe. The Munition centre continued throughout the war without being detected by the Allies. Labor was provided by both German and foreign forced laborers, including prisoners of war and concentration camp inmates, housed in about a dozen camps in the surrounding area.

The 6 square kilometre premises where the wartime arms works were built were said to be one of Germany's biggest contaminated former industrial sites, in parts with high concentrations of chemical contaminants on residential properties. Since 1991, the premises have undergone a far-reaching cleanup; in March 2006, the job was officially declared done. According to information from the Hesse Environment Ministry, the cleanup cost € 167 million. 154 tonnes of contaminants were dug out of the ground, 697 tonnes were dug out of a dump, and 3 tonnes of TNT – still capable of exploding – were unearthed.

=== Steinlager Allendorf ===
Steinlager Allendorf was a primitive American prison near the University of Marburg. where more than two-hundred Nazi general and staff officers such as Franz Halder and Heinz Guderian, and scientists such as Wilhelm Schaefer were interrogated after World War II.

== Politics ==
=== Mayors ===
- Since 2012: Christian Somogyi (SPD)

=== Town council ===
As of the last municipal elections held on 27 March 2011, town council seats are apportioned thus:

Parties and voting blocks		% 2011	Seats 2011	% 2006	Seats 2006
CDU	Christian Democratic Union	45.1	17	47.4	18
SPD	Social Democratic Party of Germany	32.9	12	32.4	12
GRÜNE	Alliance '90/The Greens	10.2	4	–	–
FDP	Free Democratic Party	6.3	2	–	–
REP	The Republicans	5.6	2	7.1	3
AGS	Association for municipal politics	–	–	6.7	2
BB-F.D.P.	Local block - F.D.P.	–	–	6.4	2
Total		100	37	100	37
Voter turnout in %		41.6		41.9	

=== Coat of arms ===
Stadtallendorf's civic coat of arms might be described thus: In azure, dexter a bear rampant sinister Or armed gules and langued Or, sinister a lion rampant striped per fess nine times in gules and argent (the Lion of Hesse), langued gules and armed Or, both holding a six-spoked wheel argent (the Wheel of Mainz).

The Hessian lion and the Wheel of Mainz stand for the town's old allegiances. Until secularization, Stadtallendorf belonged to the Archbishopric of Mainz, and thereafter to Hesse. The bear is a reference to an old name for the town, Allendorf im Bärenschießen, once used to distinguish the town from other places called Allendorf, and now needless thanks to the town's newer name. The arms have been kept even as other municipalities have been amalgamated with the old Allendorf as part of Hesse's municipal reforms.

=== Town partnerships ===
Stadtallendorf maintains partnerships with the following towns:

- St Ives, Cambridgeshire, United Kingdom since 1989
- (Germany) Coswig, Saxony-Anhalt since 1993

== Transport ==
Stadtallendorf station is served at hourly intervals by the Mittelhessen-Express (SE 30).

== Economy ==
The town is economically successful, as large factories such as Ferrero oHG mbH (confectionery), Fritz Winter GmbH & Co. KG (engine foundry), Hoppe AG (lock manufacturing), and others have chosen to build here. The town's transport connections are by road to the Federal Highways (Bundesstraßen) B 454 and B 62, and by rail to the railway station on the Main-Weser line. An extension to Bundesautobahn 49 is currently being discussed, but there have been ecological questions about the wisdom of such an undertaking: the Herrenwald (masters' woods) is home to the Great Crested Newt, which is on the list of protected species.

In an area of 78.3 km^{2} live approx. 21,600 inhabitants, 16,900 of those in the main centre, whose population is about 25% foreign.

== Population ==
(in each case as of 31 December)

- 1998 – 21,587
- 1999 – 21,643
- 2000 – 21,656
- 2001 – 21,671
- 2002 – 21,704
- 2003 – 21,708
- 2004 – 21,528
- 2006 – 21,540
- 2009 – 21,146

== Pictures of Stadtallendorf and its outlying centres ==
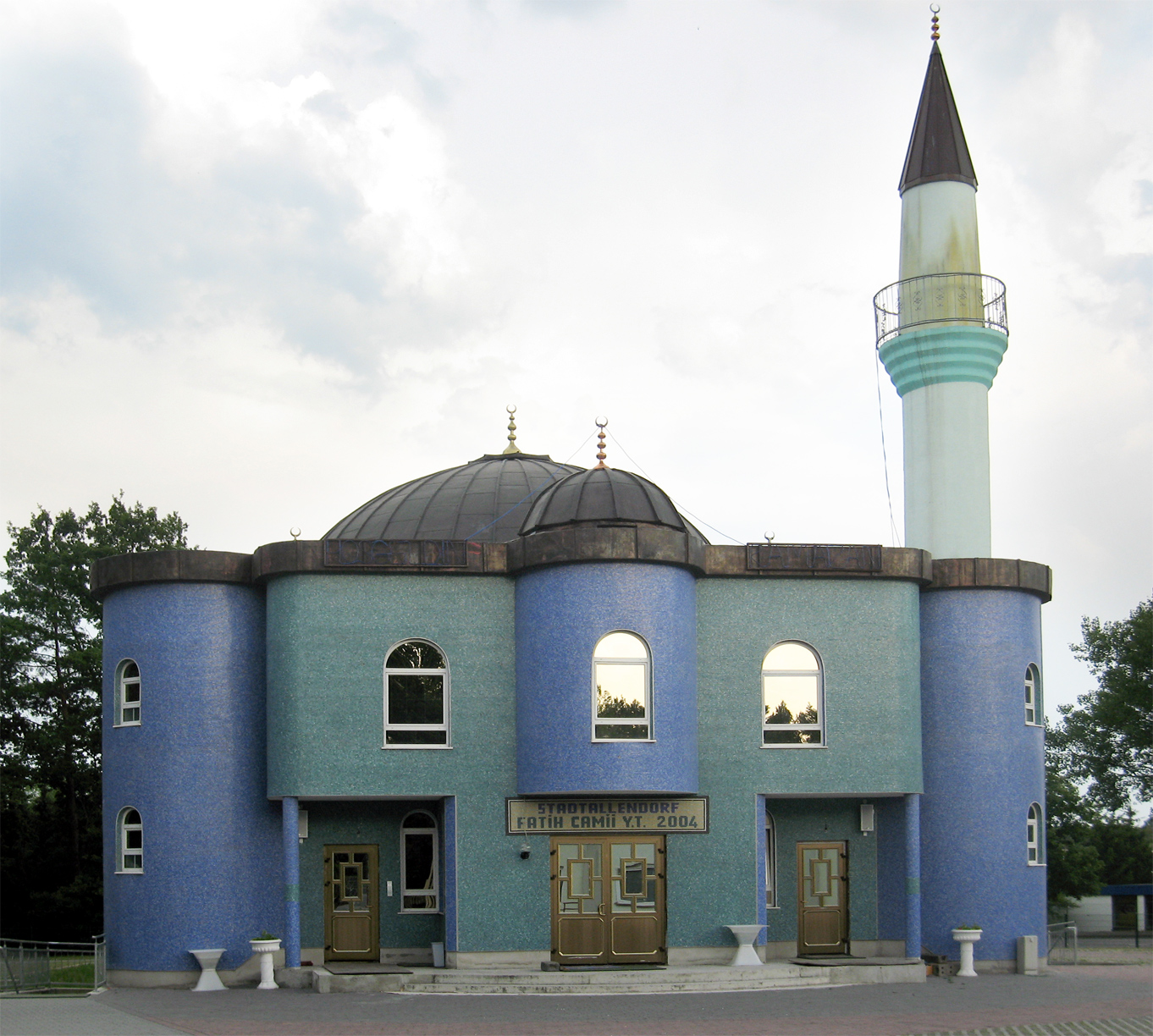
The mosque

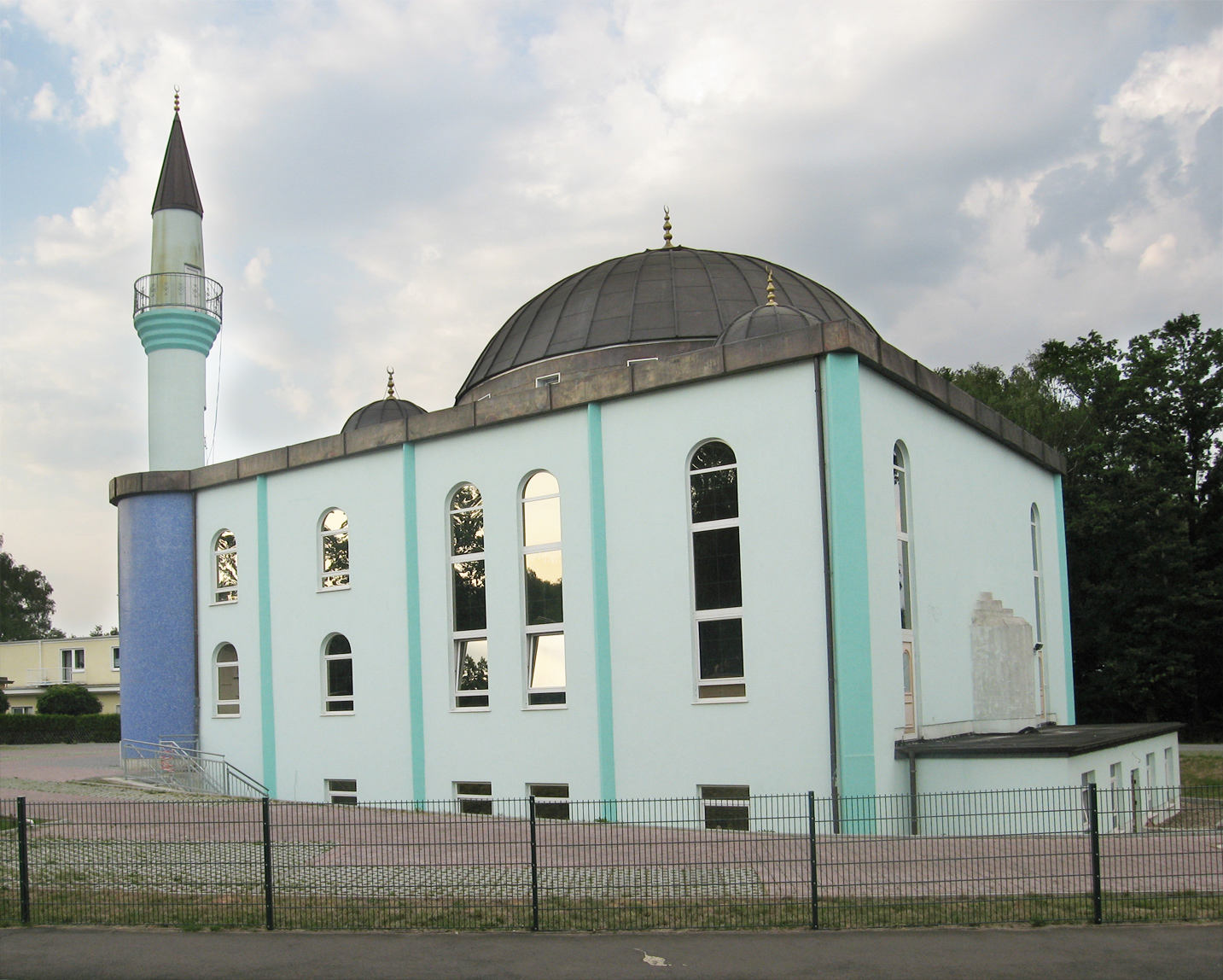
Side view

The Ferrero Works

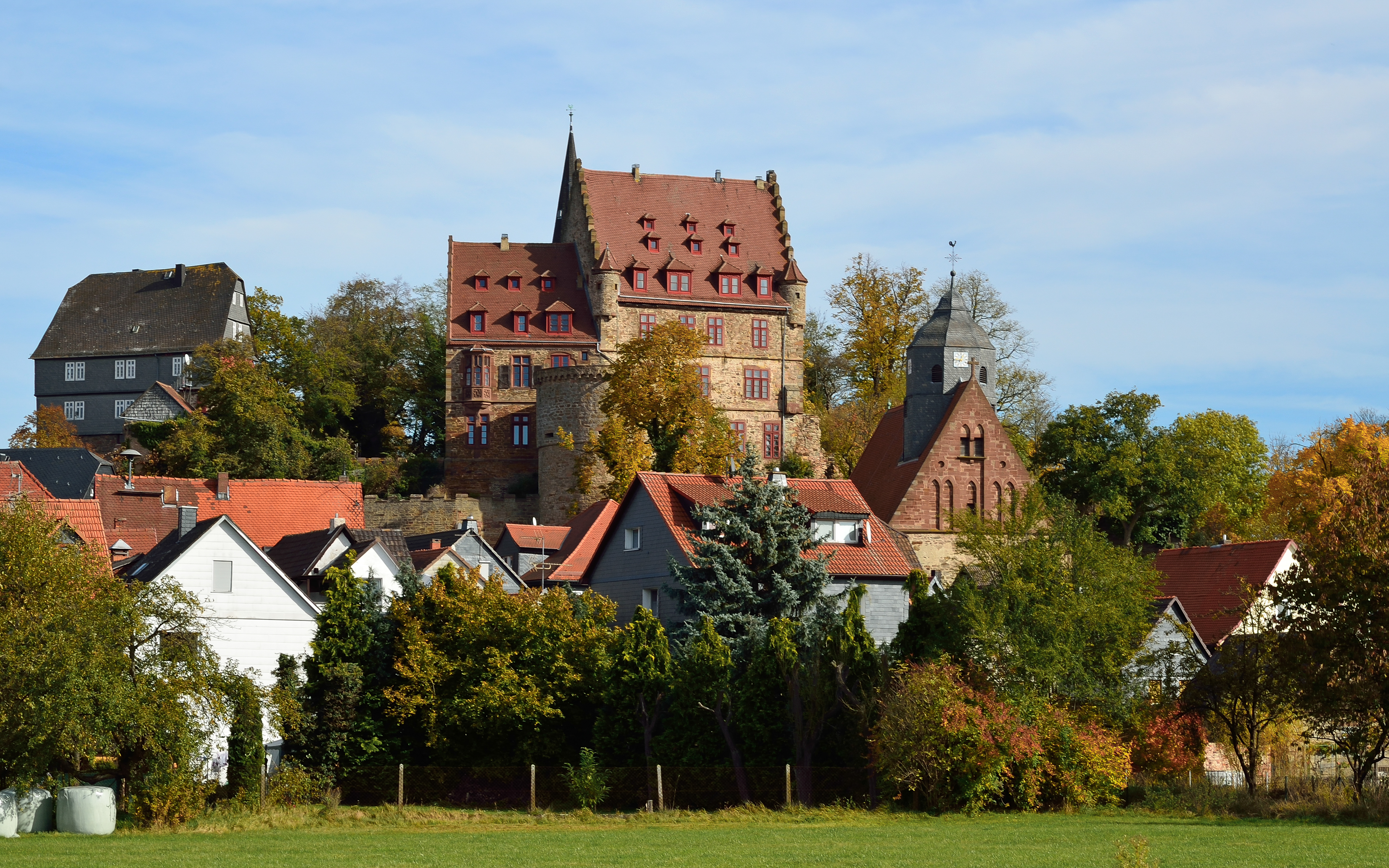
Schweinsberg (Town)

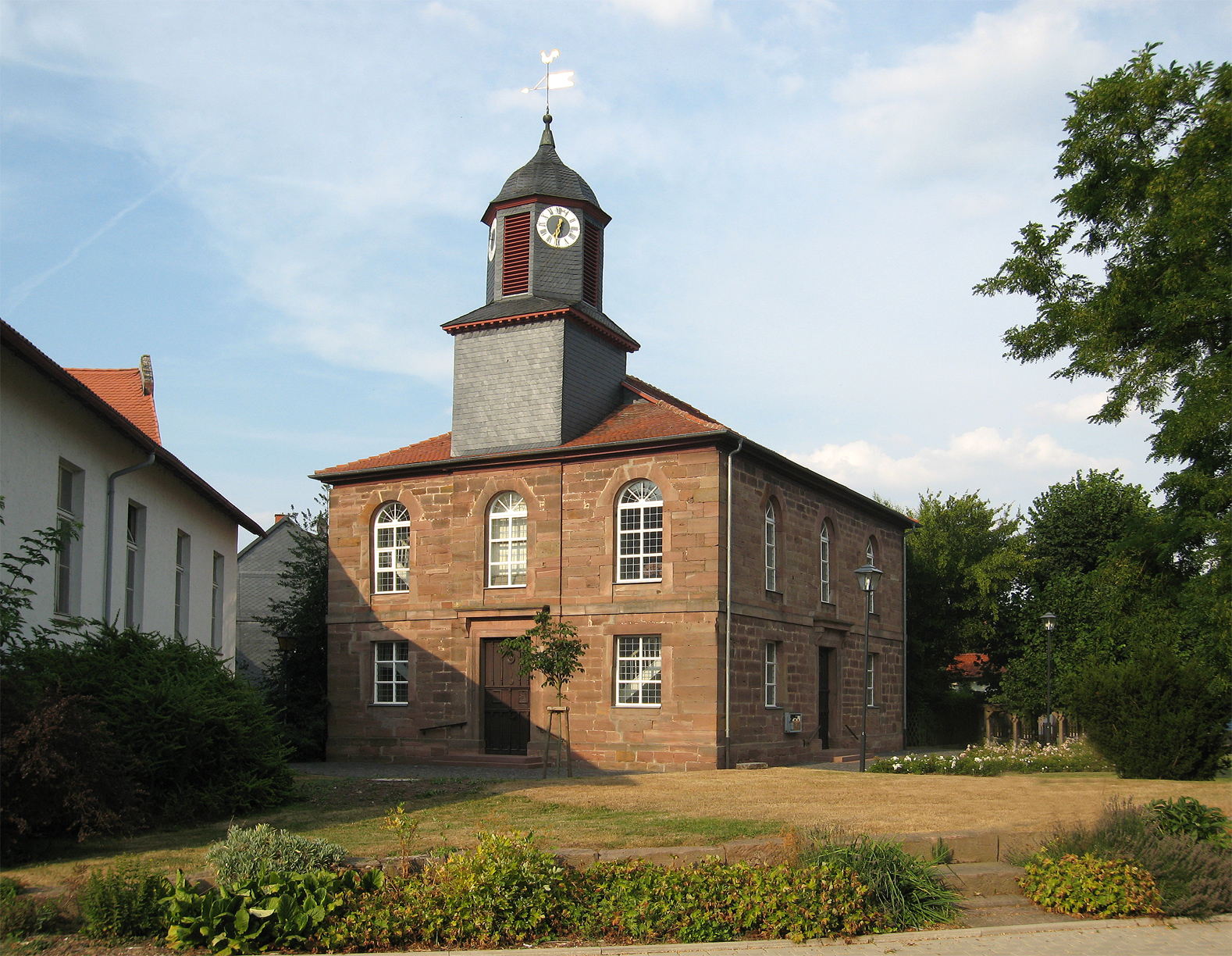
Erksdorf

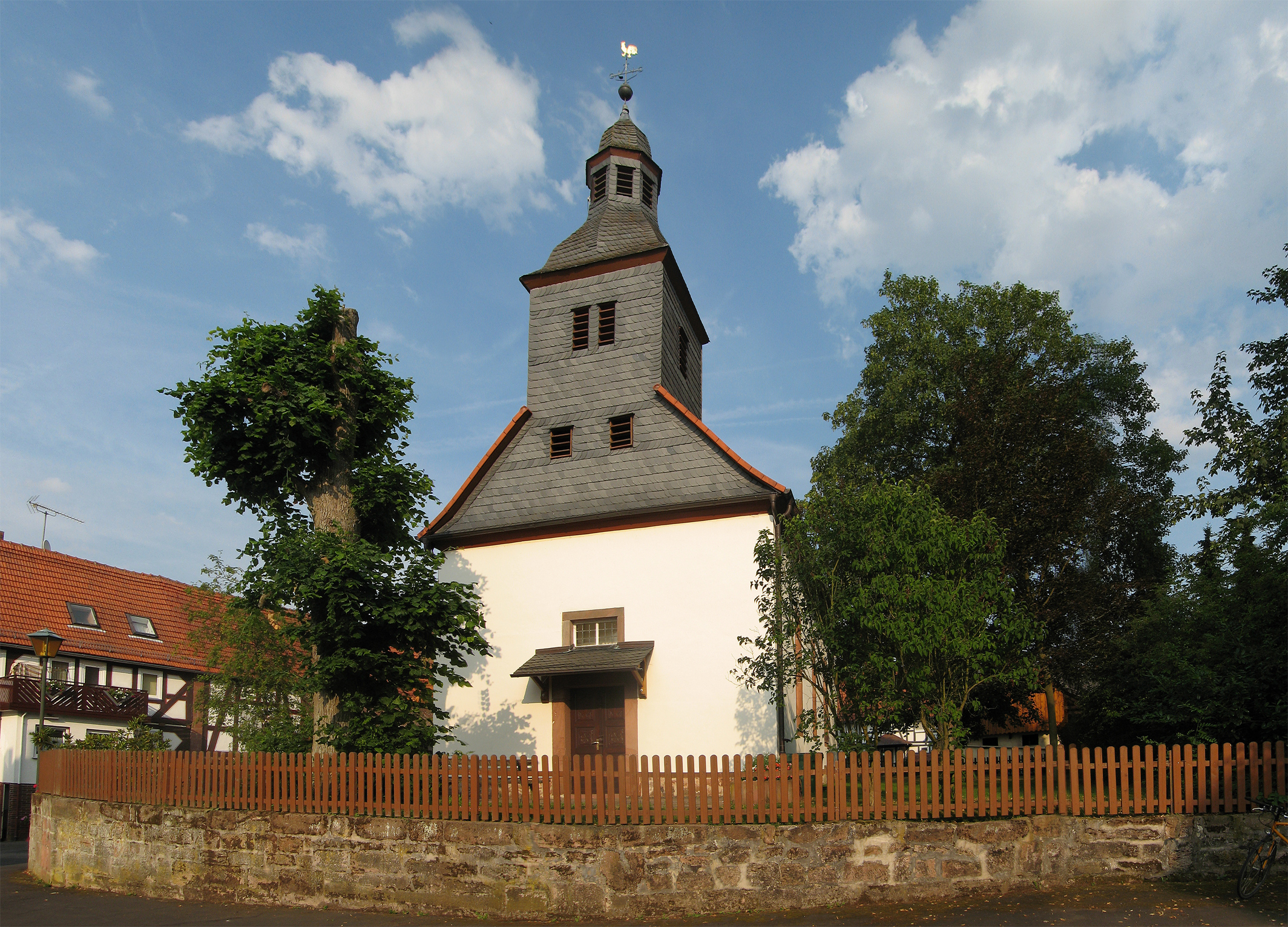
Hatzbach

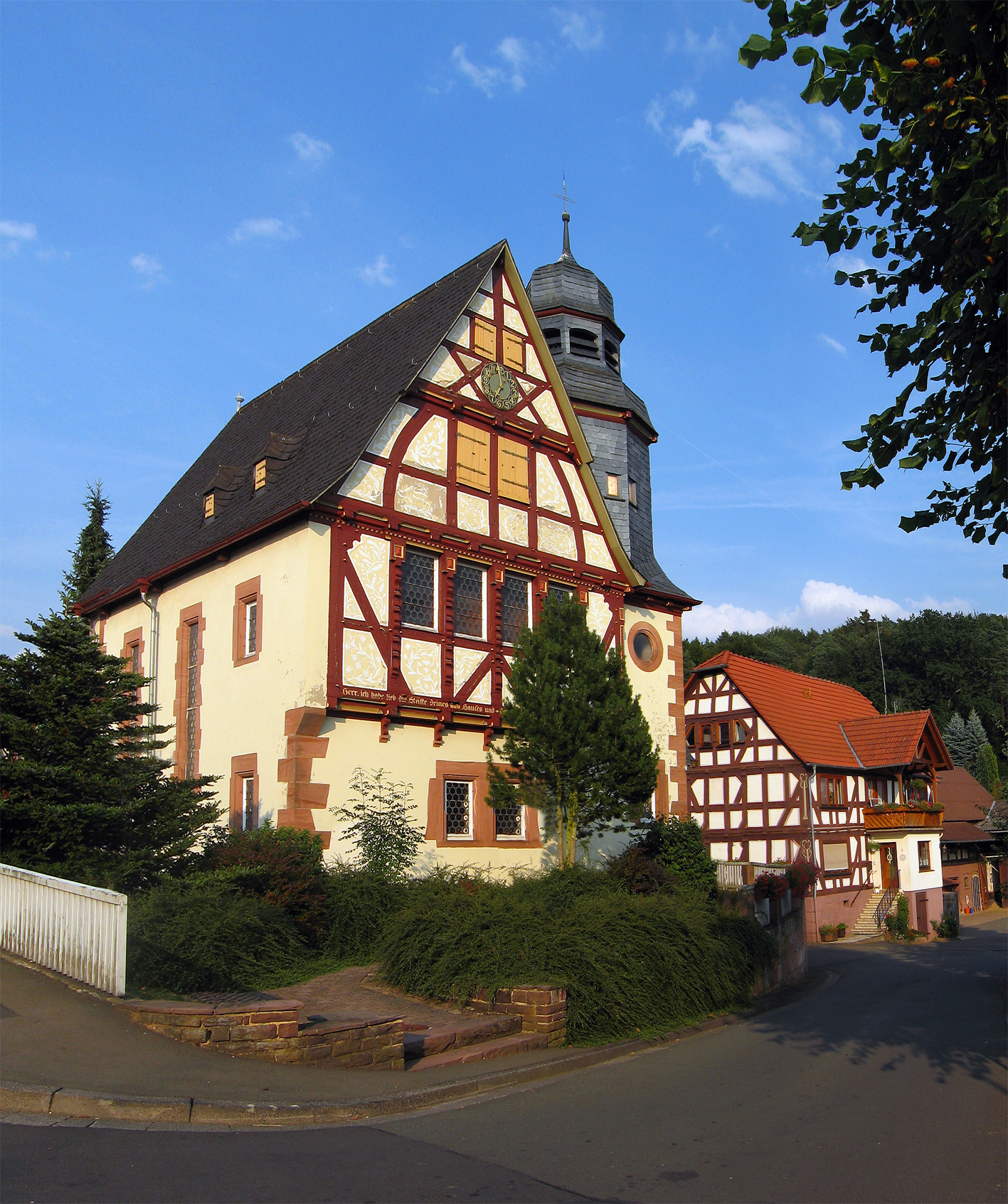
Wolferode

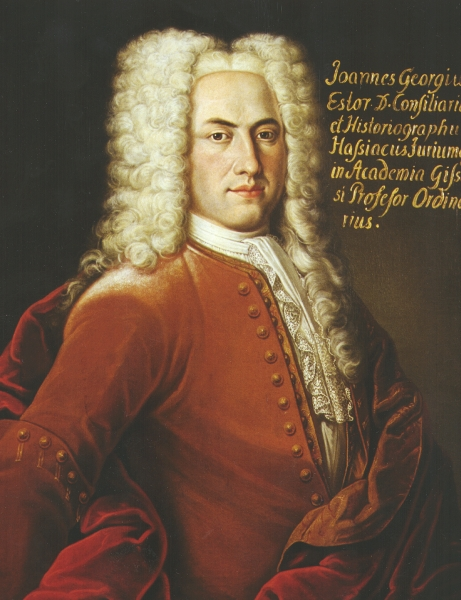
Johann Georg Estor

== Notable people ==
- Johann Georg Estor (1699–1773), lawyer and genealogist, born in Schweinsberg district
- Eike Immel (born 1960), formerly a football goalkeeper

=== Personalities who lived or worked in Stadtallendorf ===
- Margot Käßmann (born 1958), Protestant theologian and former bishop, grew up in Stadtallendorf
