= Momberg =

Momberg is a surname. Notable people with the surname include:

- George Momberg (1934–1995), Dutch-Canadian professional wrestler better known as Killer Karl Krupp
- Jacques Momberg (born 1991), South African rugby union player
- Jannie Momberg (1938–2011), South African politician, businessman, and sports administrator
