= Amöneburg =

- Town
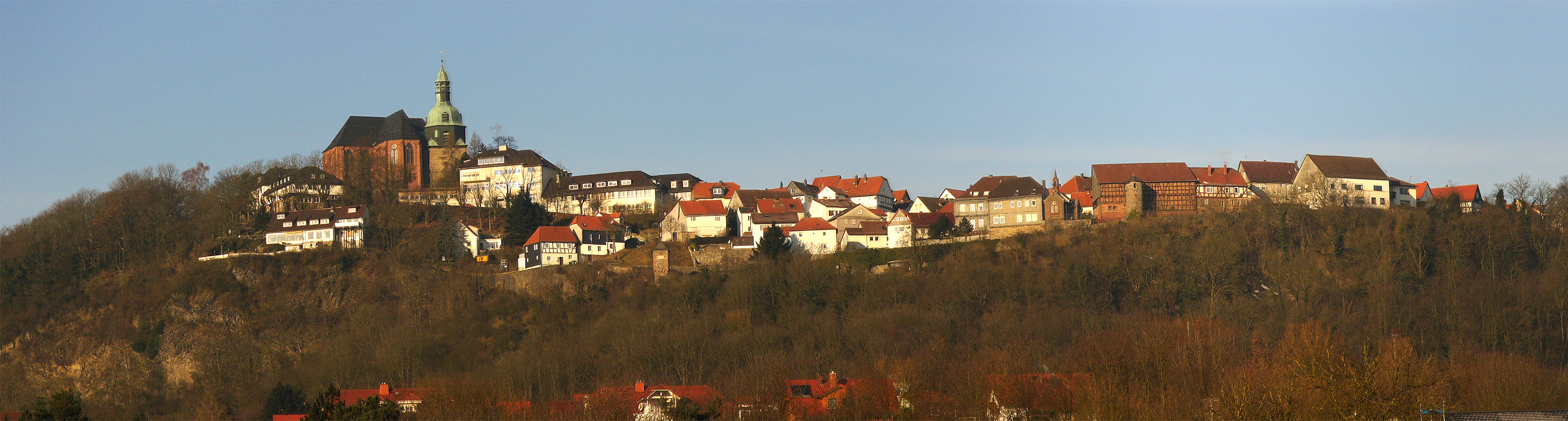
- View of the town from the east

- Coat of arms

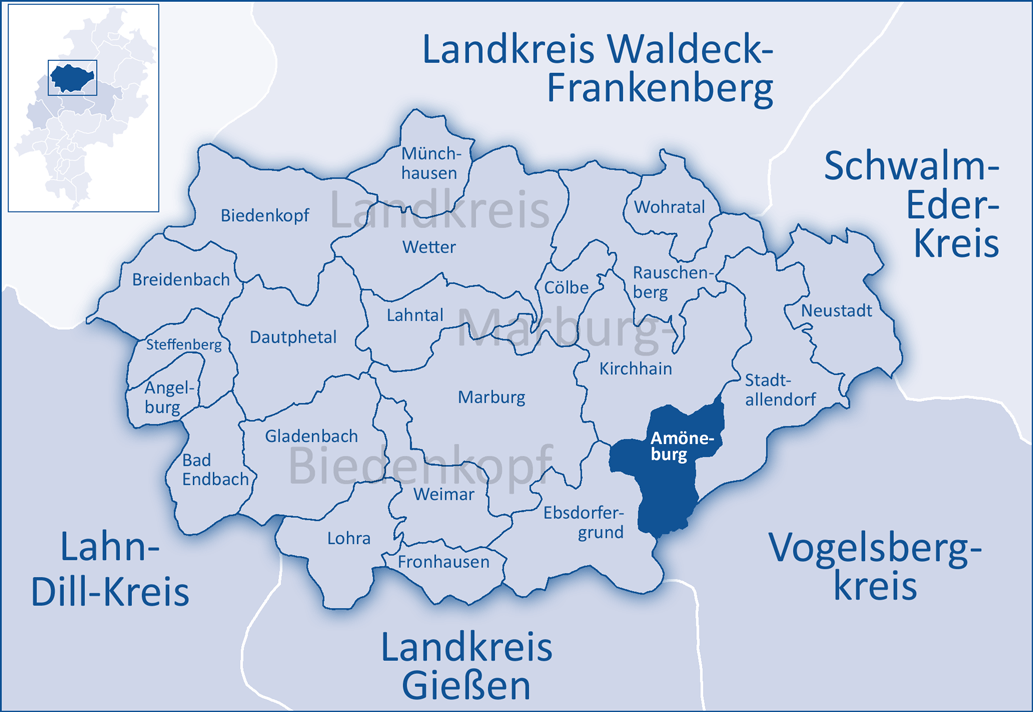
- Location of Amöneburg within Marburg-Biedenkopf district
- Interactive map of Amöneburg
- Location within Germany Location within Hesse
- Coordinates: 50°47′52″N 8°55′23″E
- Country: Germany
- State: Hesse
- Admin. region: Gießen
- District: Marburg-Biedenkopf

Government
  - Mayor (2023–29): Andre Schlipp (Ind.)

Area
  - Total: 43.9 km^{2} (16.9 sq mi)
- Elevation: 365 m (1,198 ft)

Population (2025-12-31)
  - Total: 4,951
  - Density: 113/km^{2} (292/sq mi)
- Time zone: UTC+01:00 (CET)
  - Summer (DST): UTC+02:00 (CEST)
- Postal codes: 35287
- Dialling codes: 06422
- Vehicle registration: MR
- Website: www.amoeneburg.de

Amöneburg (German pronunciation: [aˈmøːnəbʊʁk]) is a town in the Marburg-Biedenkopf district in Hesse, Germany. It lies on a mountain and is built around the castle of the same name, Burg Amöneburg.

== Geography ==
=== Location ===
Amöneburg lies on a basalt cone that can be seen from a great distance, below which flows the river Ohm, a tributary to the Lahn. From the Vogelsberg massif in the southeast, Amöneburg is split by the Amöneburg Basin, a depression suspected of being a meteorite crater. In the southwest rise the Lahn Mountains.

=== Neighbouring municipalities ===
In the north, Amöneburg borders on the town of Kirchhain, in the east on the town of Stadtallendorf (both in Marburg-Biedenkopf), in the southeast on the town of Homberg (Vogelsbergkreis), and in the west on the municipality of Ebsdorfergrund (Marburg-Biedenkopf).

=== municipalities within town ===
- Erfurtshausen
- Mardorf
- Roßdorf
- Rüdigheim

== Coat of arms ==
Amöneburg's coat of arms, like many throughout western Germany, depicts the Wheel of Mainz and Saint Martin of Tours patron saint of the diocese of Mainz cutting off a piece of his cloak for a poor man.

== History ==
Findings from digs have suggested that the area was already settled in the New Stone Age. It is supposed that in Celtic times there was a town (or oppidum) here. In 721, Saint Boniface built a small monastery and a church below the castle.

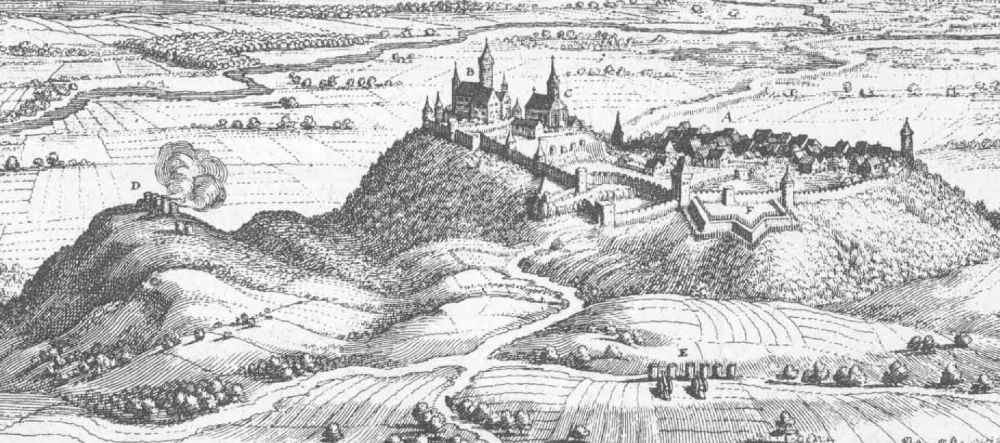
Amöneburg: from the Topographia Hassiae by Matthäus Merian 1655

At the beginning of the 12th century, much of Hesse belonged to Thuringia. The Thuringian lands, however, were so widely scattered that quite often they were interspersed with estates belonging to the Archbishopric of Mainz and its vassals. The parish of Amöneburg belonged to the archbishopric until 1803.

Amöneburg's rectangular market square was laid out in this shape in the 18th century. Also worth seeing is the Mainzer Hof with its barn and manor house at the Lindauer Tor (gate).

The adjoining church is a neo-Gothic basilica. On its north side stands the 14th-century church tower with its Baroque cupola.

Around the knoll that forms the townsite runs the town wall, still preserved to a great extent. A loop road offers good views of the surrounding countryside.

At the southeastern foot of the crags on which the town is built lies the Brückermühle, and old mill, with an old stone bridge (Ohmbrücke) across the river Ohm, which was an historically important crossing. It is known from the Hessians' and Brunswickers' fight against the French in 1762, recalled nowadays by a Baroque obelisk in the yard outside the Brückerwirtshaus (inn).

In June 1646 Imperialist forces took the town by treaty.

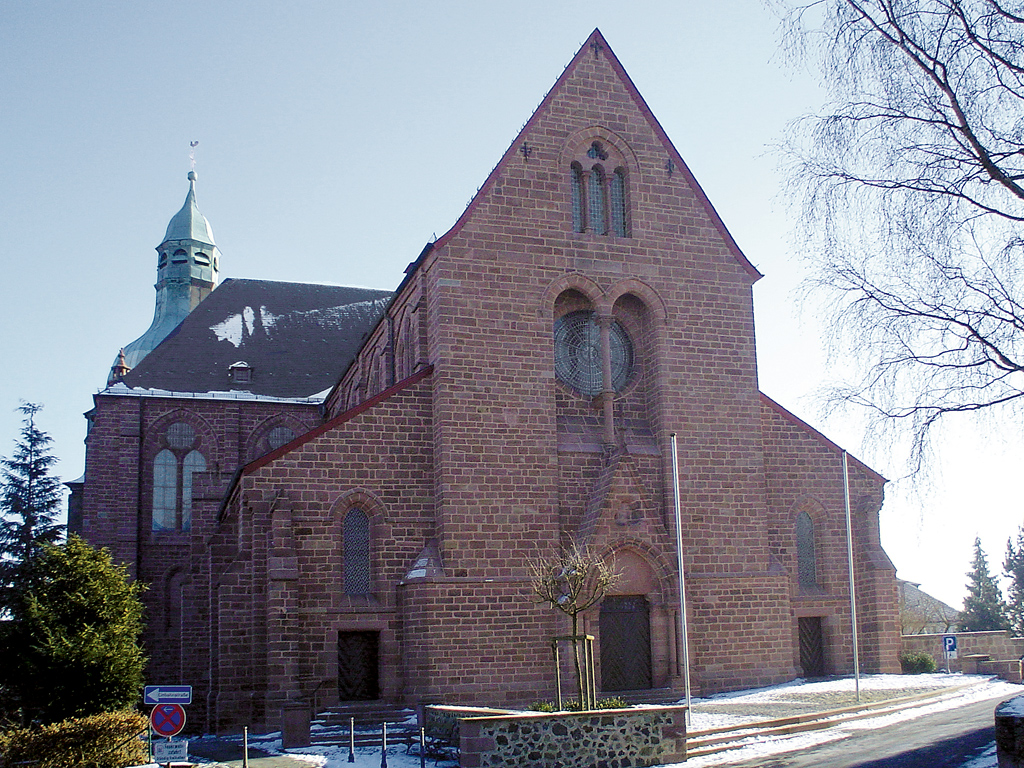
Stiftskirche St. Johann

=== Abandonments ===
Around Amöneburg, the abandoned municipalities of Brück, Brunsfort, Gerende, Heuchelheim, Lindau, Radenhausen and Wanehusen may be found.

== Politics ==
=== Mayors ===
- 1996-2002: Oliver Haupt
- 2002-2005: Anders Arendt
- 2005-today: Michael Richter-Plettenberg

=== Town council ===
As of municipal elections held on March 6, 2016, town council seats are apportioned thus:

CDU	11 seats
SPD	6 seats
FWG (citizens' coalition)	6 seats

== Transport ==
Somewhat north of Amöneburg runs Federal Highway B 62 (Biedenkopf - Alsfeld) with connections to B 454 to Schwalmstadt and B 3 towards Marburg. The nearest railway connections is 5 km north, in Kirchhain.

== Regular events ==
- Kirchweihfest (Church dedication festival, yearly, last weekend in August, organized by local clubs)

== Museums ==
Museum Amöneburg: Prehistory and early history of the Amöneburg Basin, agricultural history, mediaeval fortifications and finds from digs, models and dioramas with explanatory notices, and in the attic rooms a nature preservation information centre.

== Personalities ==
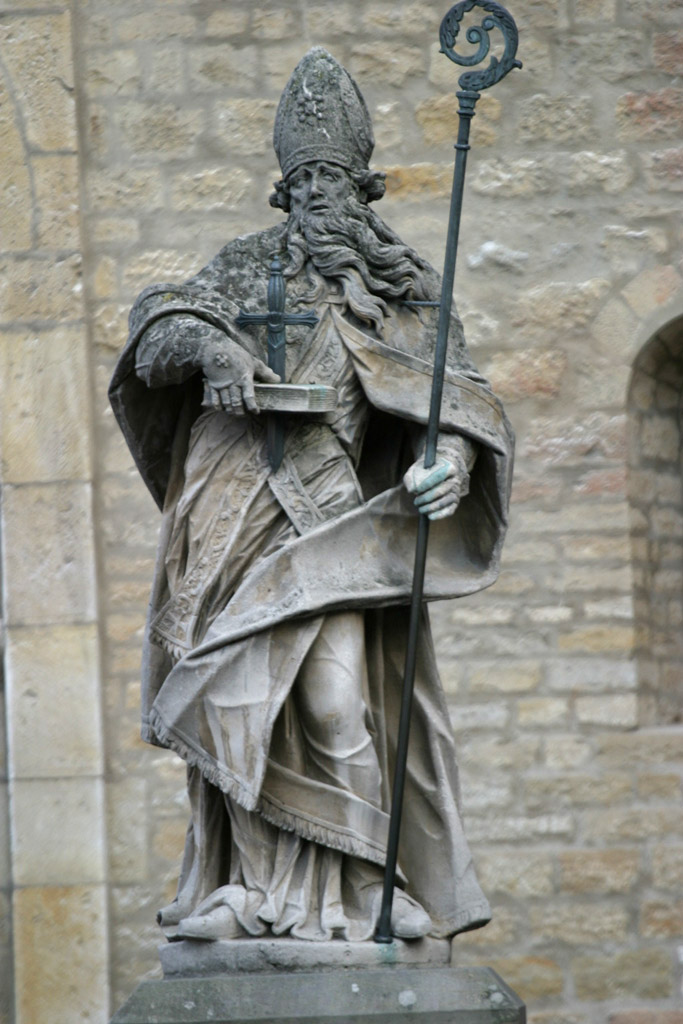
Statue of Saint Boniface, in the background the Cathedral of Mainz

- Saint Boniface (around 673-754 or 755), founded 721 founded a monastery cell below the castle Amöneburg and began the Christianization of Upper Hesse from Amöneburg
- Johannes Eisermann, (1486–1558), (born in Amönenburg), called Ferrarius Montanus, religious scholar, jurist and first rector of the University of Marburg.
- Ludwig Schick (born 1949), auxiliary bishop in Fulda from 1998 to 2002, since 2002 Archbishop of Bamberg, visited in Amöneburg the seminary St. Johann.

== Town partnerships ==
- Château-Garnier, France, since 1974
- Tragwein, Austria
- Tuoro sul Trasimeno, Italy, since 1987

There has also been a common "ring" partnership among these towns since 1997.
