= Wohra =

River in Germany

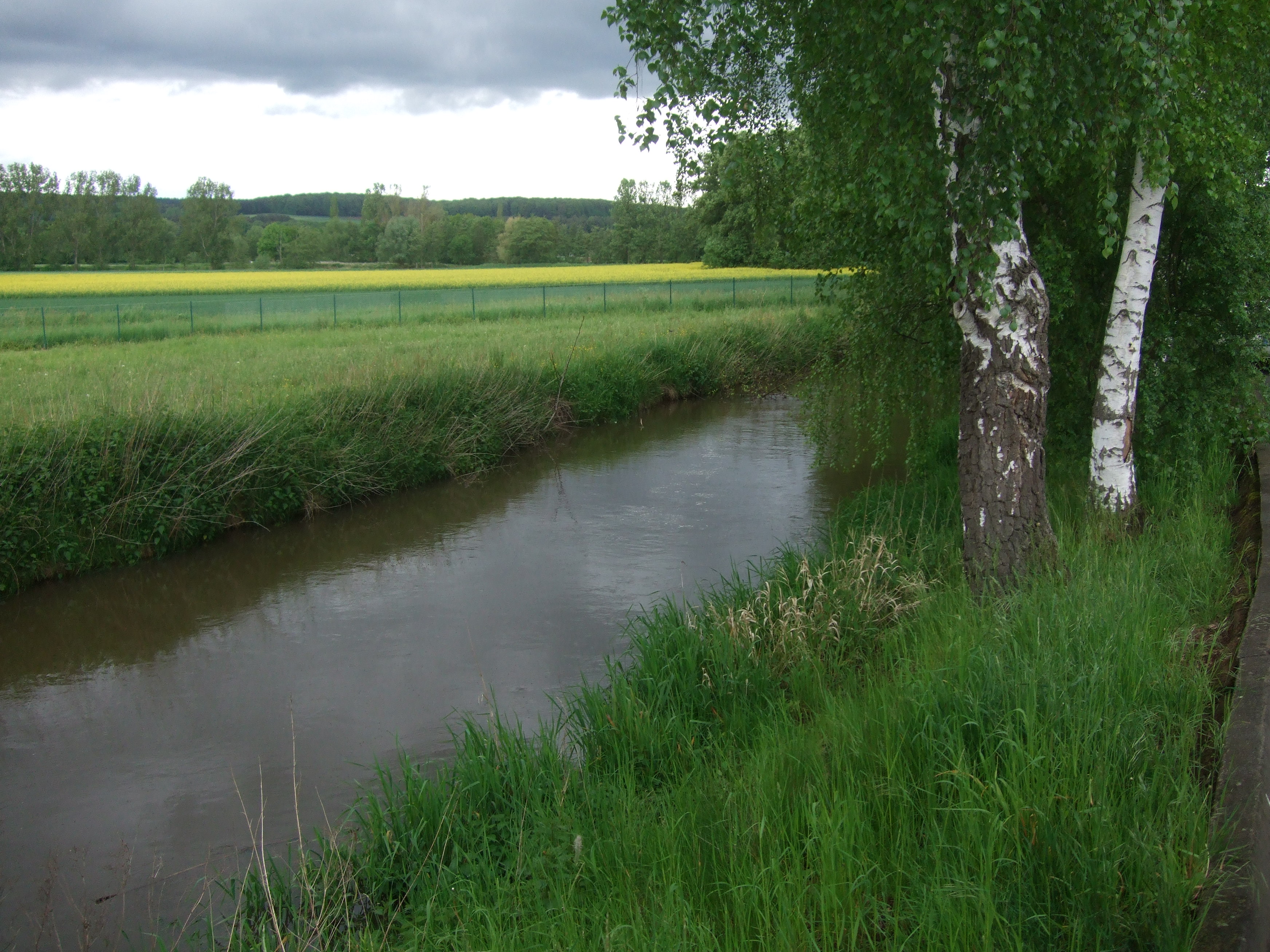

Location
- Country: Germany
- State: Hesse

Physical characteristics
- Mouth
  - location: Ohm
  - coordinates: 50.8171°N 8.8949°E
- Length: 34.2 km (21.3 mi)
- Basin size: 287 km^{2} (111 sq mi)

Basin features
- Progression: Ohm→ Lahn→ Rhine→ North Sea

Wohra (German pronunciation: [ˈvoːʁa]) is a river of Hesse, Germany. It flows into the Ohm near Kirchhain.

== See also ==
- List of rivers of Hesse
