= Kirchhain =

- Town
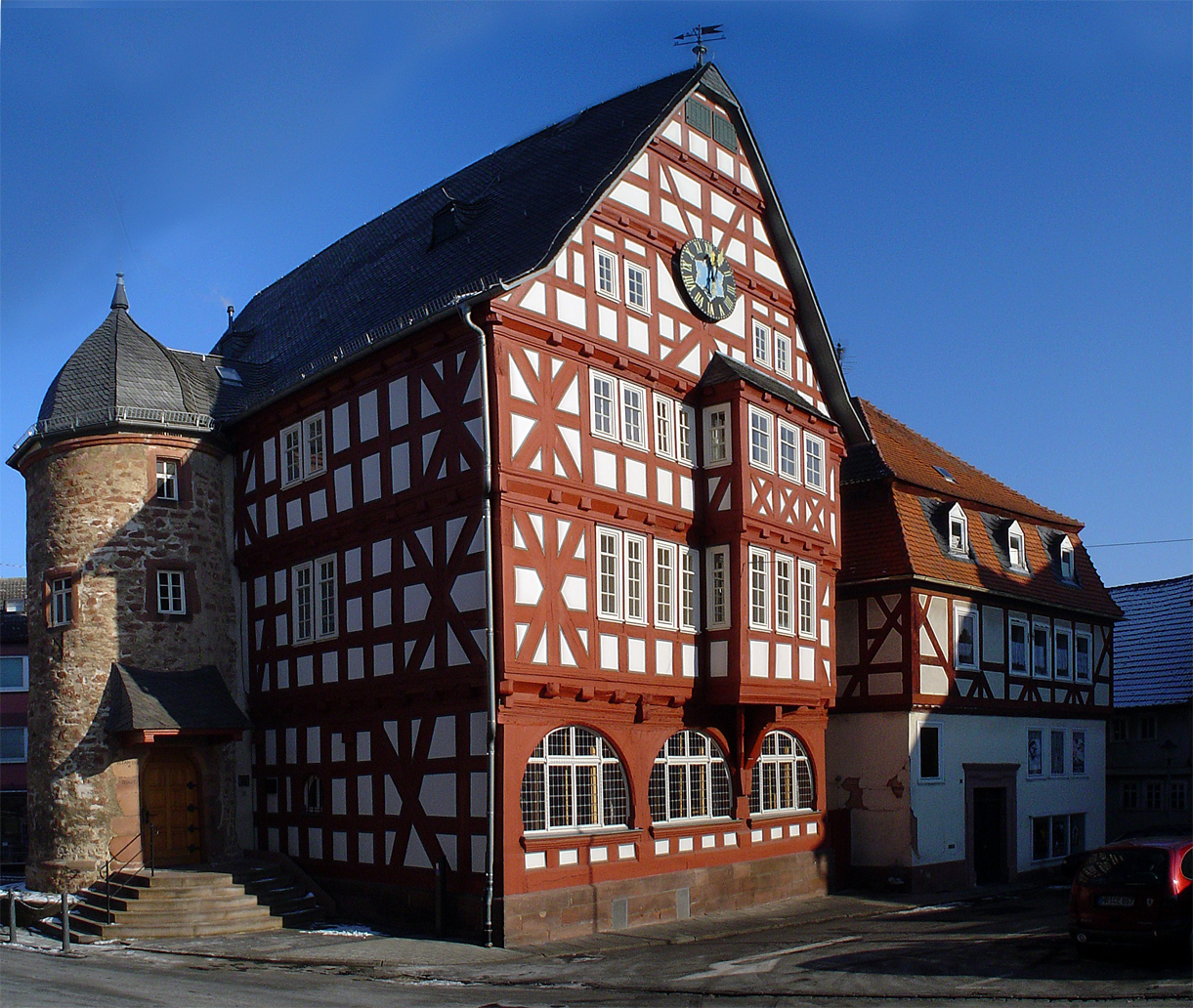
- Kirchhain's Town Hall.

- Coat of arms

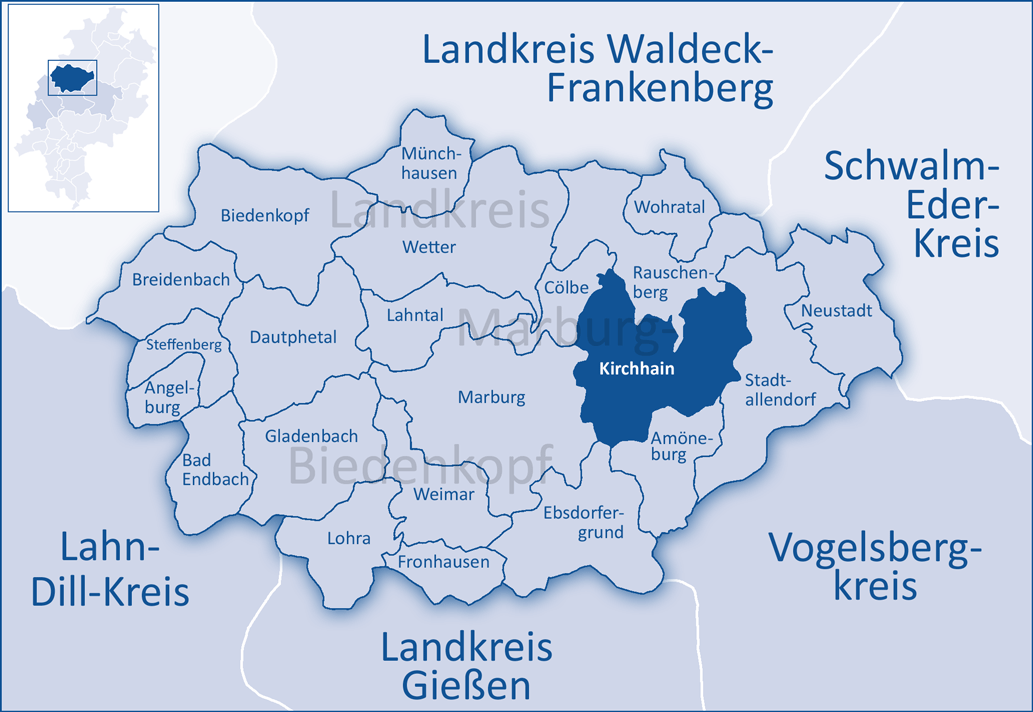
- Location of Kirchhain within Marburg-Biedenkopf district
- Interactive map of Kirchhain
- Location within Germany Location within Hesse
- Coordinates: 50°49′N 8°55′E
- Country: Germany
- State: Hesse
- Admin. region: Gießen
- District: Marburg-Biedenkopf
- Subdivisions: 13 Stadtbezirke

Government
  - Mayor (2022–28): Olaf Hausmann (SPD)

Area
  - Total: 90.95 km^{2} (35.12 sq mi)
- Elevation: 208 m (682 ft)

Population (2025-12-31)
  - Total: 16,297
  - Density: 179.2/km^{2} (464.1/sq mi)
- Time zone: UTC+01:00 (CET)
  - Summer (DST): UTC+02:00 (CEST)
- Postal codes: 35274
- Dialling codes: 06422
- Vehicle registration: MR
- Website: www.kirchhain.de

Kirchhain (German pronunciation: [ˈkɪʁçhaɪn]) is a town in Marburg-Biedenkopf district in Hesse, Germany.

== Geography ==
Kirchhain is located in the heart of the state of Hesse in Marburg-Biedenkopf district. Geographically, it is surrounded by the Amöneburg Basin on the southeast edge of the Burgwald (a low mountain range) about 15 km east of Marburg on the rivers Ohm and Wohra.

=== Neighbouring municipalities ===
In the north, Kirchhain borders on the town of Rauschenberg, in the east on the town of Stadtallendorf, in the south on the town of Amöneburg and the municipality of Cölbe.

== Town divisions ==
Besides the main centre of Kirchhain with about 8,300 inhabitants, 12 further constituent municipalities share another 8,900 people:

- Anzefahr
- Betziesdorf
- Burgholz
- Emsdorf
- Großseelheim
- Himmelsberg
- Kleinseelheim
- Langenstein
- Niederwald
- Schönbach
- Sindersfeld
- Stausebach, first mentioned in 1268 as Stuzenbach.

== History ==
In prehistoric times a network of long-distance and connecting trails crossed back and forth over the area where the town of Kirchhain was later to be founded. Since the early New Stone Age, there is evidence of almost continuous settlement in the area through various epochs. The high point of the expansion of settlement was in the early Iron Age (5th century BC). The first territorial development however began only in the 12th century; in 1146 the settlement was first mentioned in a document under the name "Werphloh". The region belonged at that time to the landgravates of Thuringia and Hesse, whereas the neighbouring Amöneburg and vast parts of the surrounding lands belonged to the Archbishops of Mainz. Time and again, the Hessians and Mainzers came to blows over who had ascendancy over these lands. As of the 13th century, the landgraves of Hesse further upgraded Kirchhain as a Hessian bulwark against Mainz's centre of Amöneburg so that they could control the region. Kirchhain then developed into the economic centre of the Amöneburg Basin. Kirchhain was presumably given town rights before 1348, but without any earlier documentary proof, the year 1352 has come to be seen as the official year of the town's founding.

From the 15th century, the important Lange Hessen and Cologne-Leipzig trade roads made of Kirchhain a road hub and thereby spurred on the town's further economic development. Its good traffic connections, however, led to Kirchhain's being occupied a few times during the Thirty Years' War, becoming for a time the headquarters of various armies, and thereby having to suffer as troops were billeted in the town. In 1636, about 12,000 to 14,000 soldiers were being housed in and around the town. For the 1,000 or so townsfolk at that time, this was a tremendous burden.

Kirchhain likewise had to put up with such troubles in the Seven Years' War as its good traffic connections once again led troops to the town.

From 1821 on, Kirchhain was the district seat (Kreisstadt) of the newly created Kirchhain administrative district, until this was combined with the Marburg district in 1932.

== Politics ==
=== Town council ===
As of municipal elections held on 26 March 2006, seats on town council are apportioned thus:

CDU	15 seats
SPD	15 seats
Greens	4 seats
FDP	2 seats
UWG (citizens' coalition)	1 seat

Elections in March 2016:

- CDU: 13 seats
- SPD: 17 seats
- Greens: 3 seats
- The LEFT: 2 seats
- FDP: 2 seats
- Total: 37 seats

=== Transportation ===
Kirchhain has a train station and lies on the Main-Weser Railway.

=== Town partnerships ===
- Plomelin, Brittany, France (since 1966)
- (Germany) Doberlug-Kirchhain, Brandenburg (since 1989)

== Buildings ==
- Town Hall (Rathaus), the town's landmark, built about 1450 with timber framing.
- The Haus „Zum blauen Löwen“, built 1612, birth house of the poet Eberhard Werner Happel
- Evangelische Stadtkirche St. Michael, a 15th-century church
- Transformatorenhäuschen in the borough Anzefahr

== Notable people ==
=== People born in Kirchhain ===
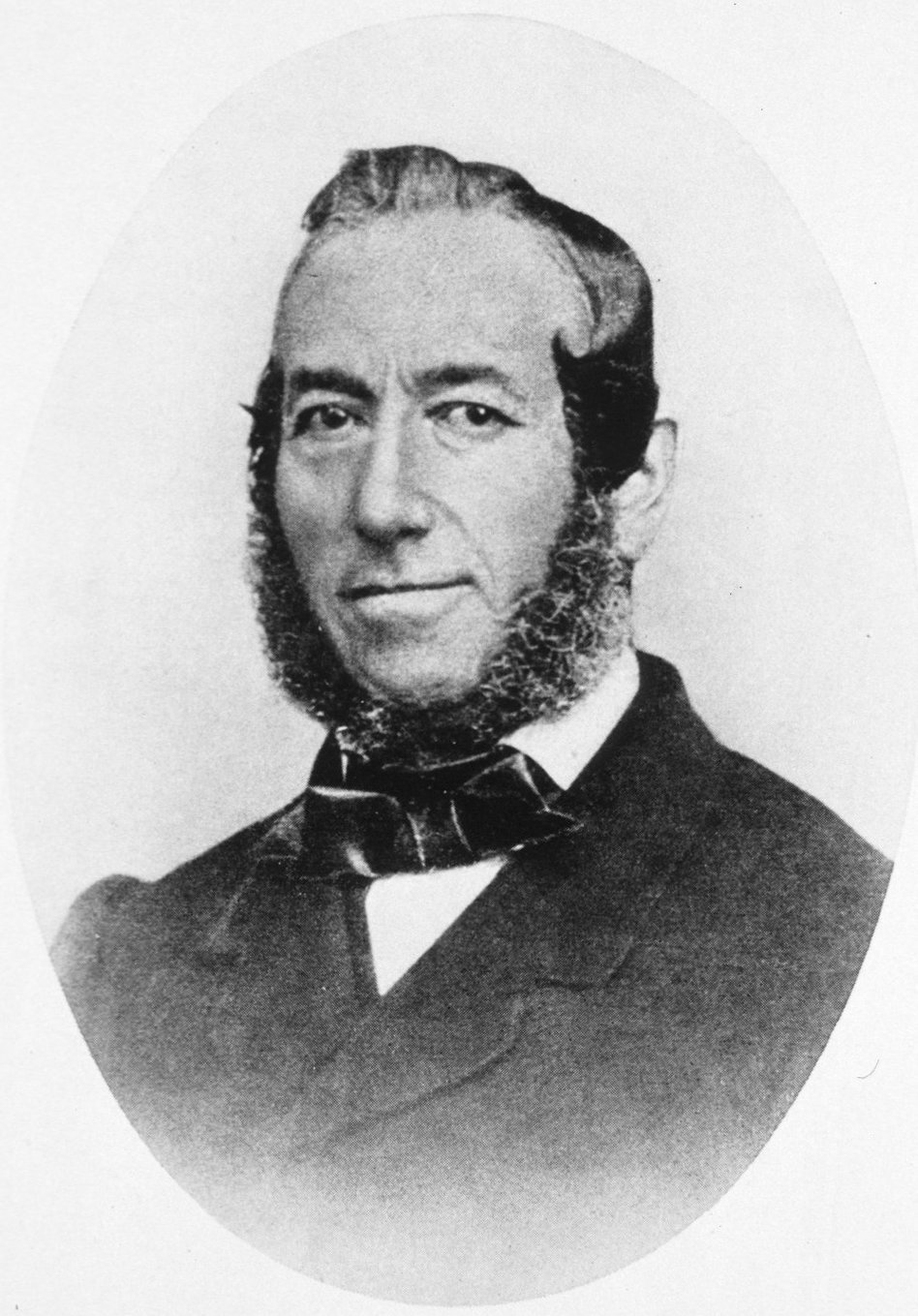
Benedict Stilling 1901

- Fritz Cron (born 1925), motorcycle racing driver, list of world champions in the motorcycle road race#world champions 1954 and 1956
- Eberhard Werner Happel (1657-1690), poet
- Albert Henze (1894-1979), general lieutenant in the Second World War
- Heinrich Kornmann (1570-1627), jurist, Kurmainzischer Rat and chronicler
- Heinrich von Langenstein (1325-1397), theologian, church politician and astronomer
- Wilhelm Noll (1926-2017), motorcycle-sidecar world champion
- Daniel Pabst (1826-1910), cabinetmaker
- Benedict Stilling (1810-1879), physician and anatomist
- Leo Strauss (1899-1973), philosopher
- Heinrich Joseph Wetzer (1801-1853), Orientalist
- Hennoch Wolf, also known as Elchanan Henle Kirchhain (1666-1757), rabbi and author of the Yiddish moral book Simchat ha-Nefesch

=== People who have lived or worked in Kirchhain ===
- Friedrich Bohl (born 1945), politician (CDU), from 1991 to 1998 Federal Minister for special tasks Head of the Federal Chancellery, living in Kirchhain
- Gabriela Lesch (born 1964), medium-haul, living in Kirchhain
- Ludwig Vogel (1920-2014), Roman Catholic priest, chaplain in Kirchhain-Anzefahr
