= Ohm (river) =

River in Germany

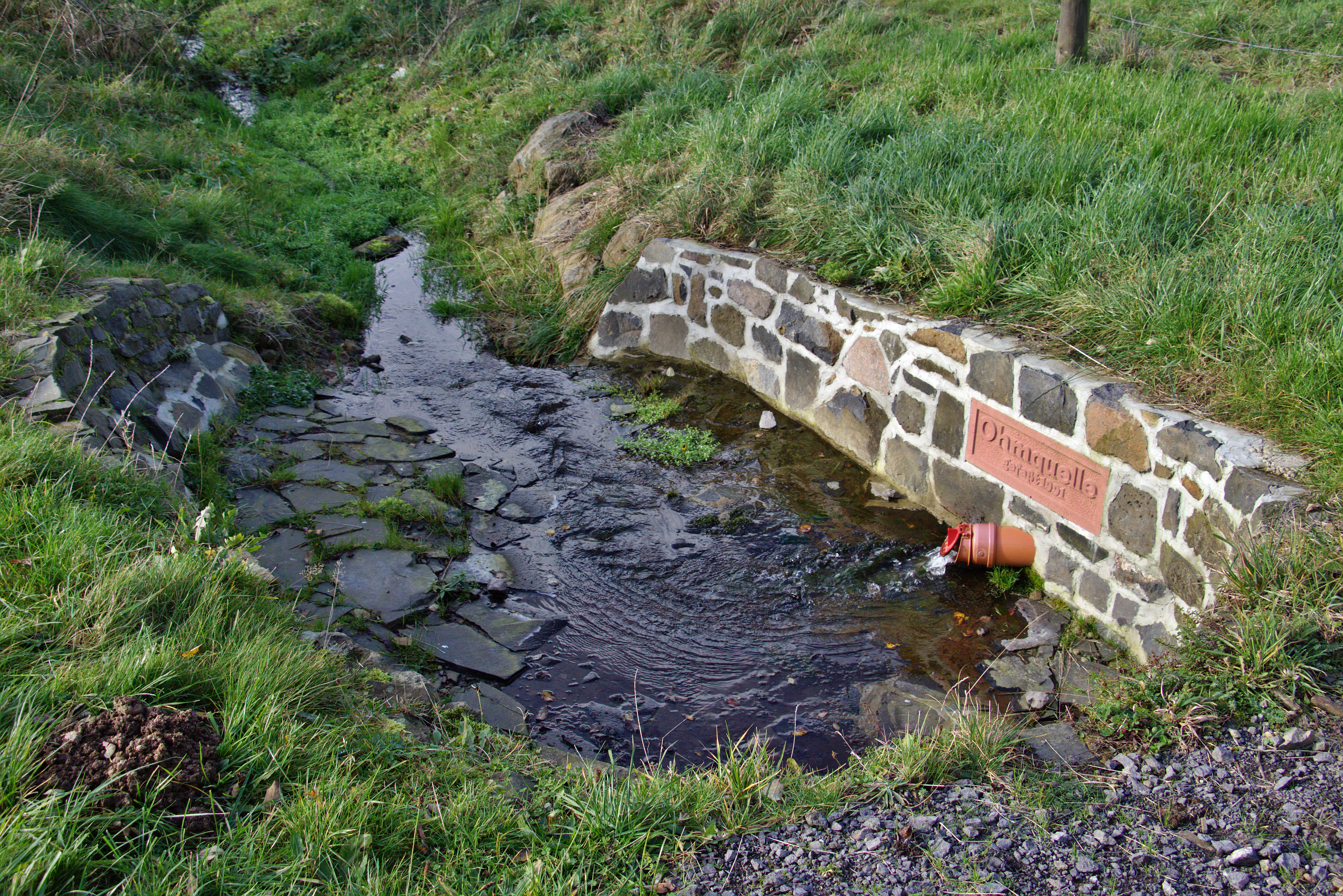
- Ohm source east of Ulrichstein

Location
- Country: Germany
- State: Hesse

Physical characteristics
- Source
  - location: Near the town Ulrichstein in the High Vogelsberg region.
  - elevation: 577 m (1,893 ft)
- Mouth
  - location: Lahn, short before the town Cölbe
  - coordinates: 50°51′15″N 8°47′41″E
  - elevation: 188 m (617 ft)
- Length: 60.7 km (37.7 mi)
- Basin size: 983.2 km^{2} (379.6 sq mi)
- Discharge
  - average: 62.6 m^{3}/s (2,210 cu ft/s)

Basin features
- Progression: Lahn→ Rhine→ North Sea

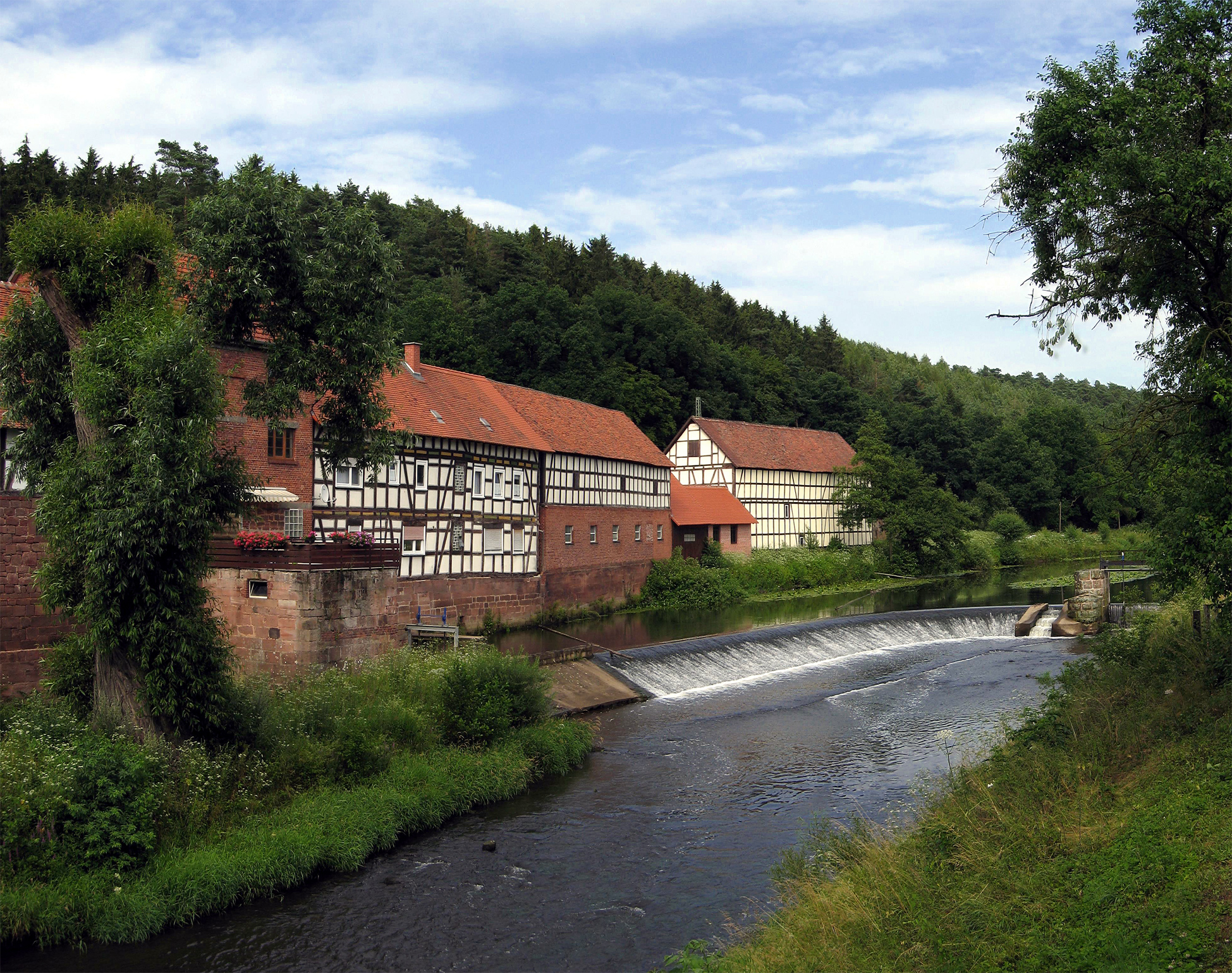
A watermill named Hainmühle (established 1555) near the village Betziesdorf

The Ohm (German pronunciation: [oːm]; older Amana) is a river in Hesse, Germany.

It is a right tributary of the Lahn. Its total length is 61 km (38 mi). The Ohm originates in the Vogelsberg Mountains, east of the town Ulrichstein. It flows generally northwest through Ulrichstein, Mücke, Homberg, Amöneburg, Kirchhain, and joins the Lahn in Cölbe, near Marburg. Its largest tributaries are the Seenbach, Felda, Klein, Wohra and Rotes Wasser.
