= Anton Sabel =

German politician (1902–1983)

Member of the Bundestag; for Fulda
- In office 7 September 1949 – 16 September 1957
- Preceded by: Constituency established
- Succeeded by: Hermann Götz

Personal details
- Born: 15 October 1902 Neuwied, Germany
- Died: 5 January 1983 (aged 80) Fulda, West Germany
- Party: Christian Democratic Union

Anton Sabel (15 October 1902 – 5 January 1983) was a German politician of the Christian Democratic Union (CDU) and former member of the German Bundestag.

== Political career ==
Sabel was a directly elected member of the German Bundestag in the Fulda constituency from its first election in 1949 until 16 September 1957.

== Literature ==
Herbst, Ludolf; Jahn, Bruno (2002). Vierhaus, Rudolf (ed.). Biographisches Handbuch der Mitglieder des Deutschen Bundestages. 1949–2002 [Biographical Handbook of the Members of the German Bundestag. 1949–2002] (in German). München: De Gruyter - De Gruyter Saur. p. 1715. ISBN 978-3-11-184511-1.
