= Fulda =

City in Hesse, Germany

- City
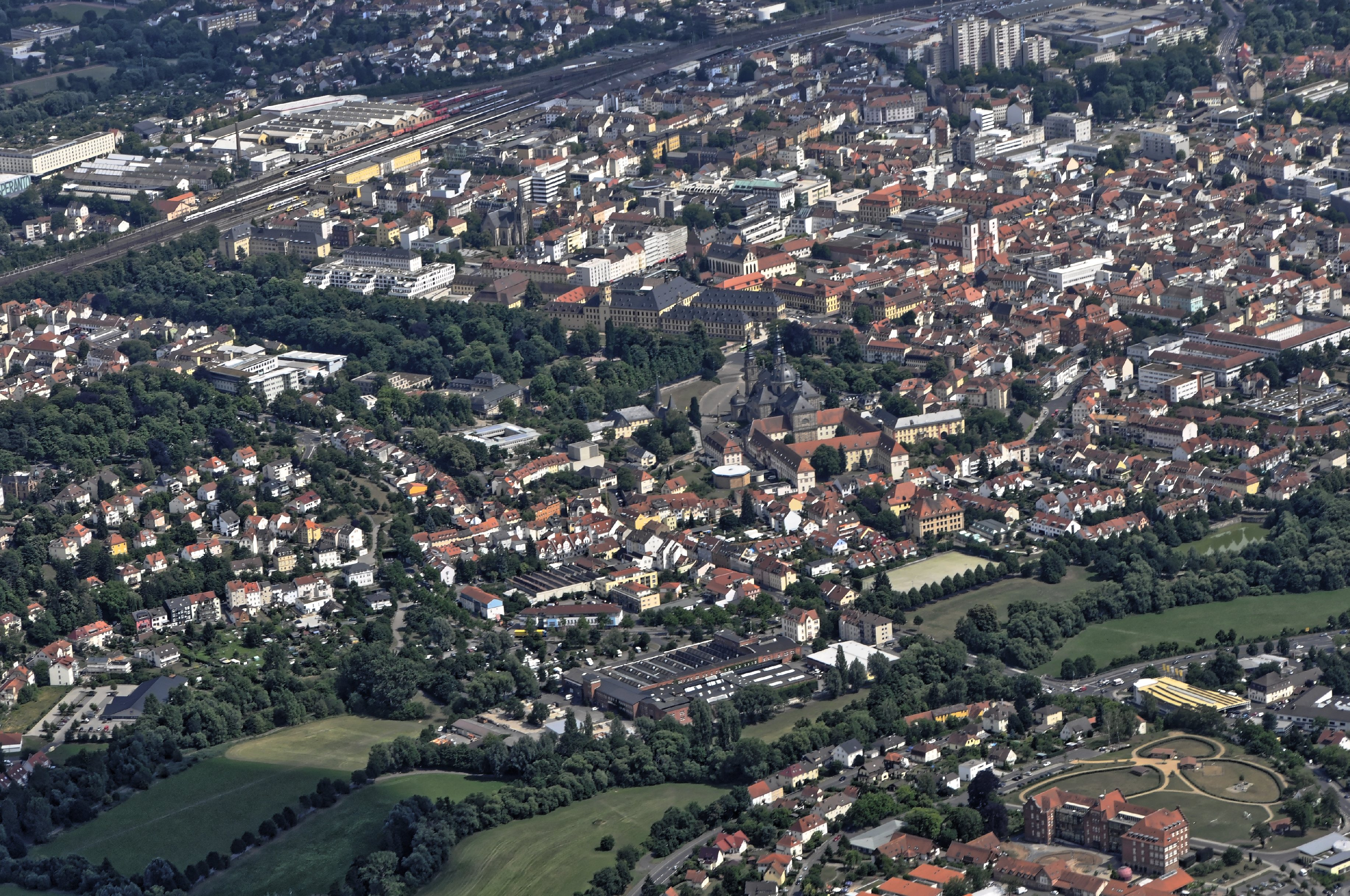
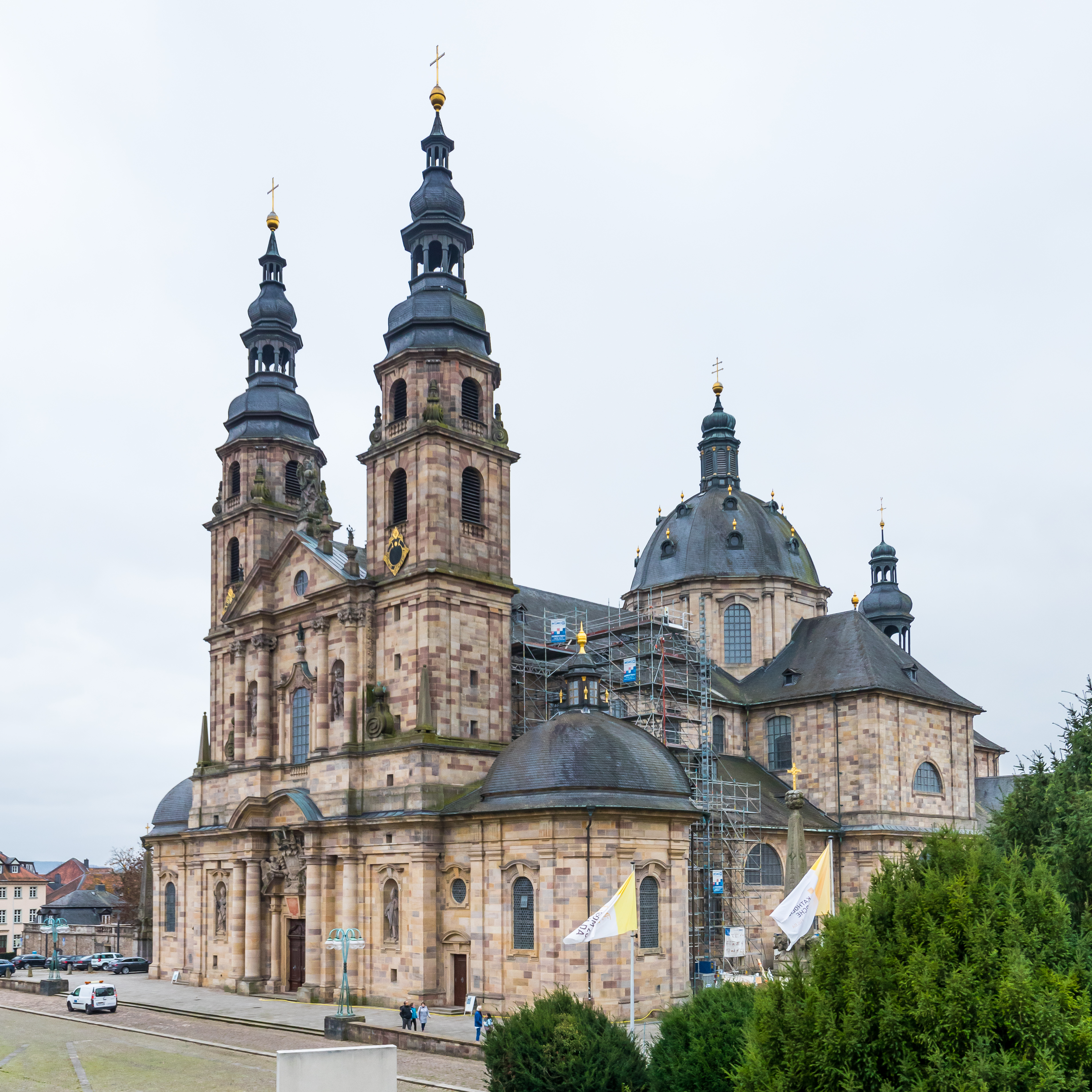
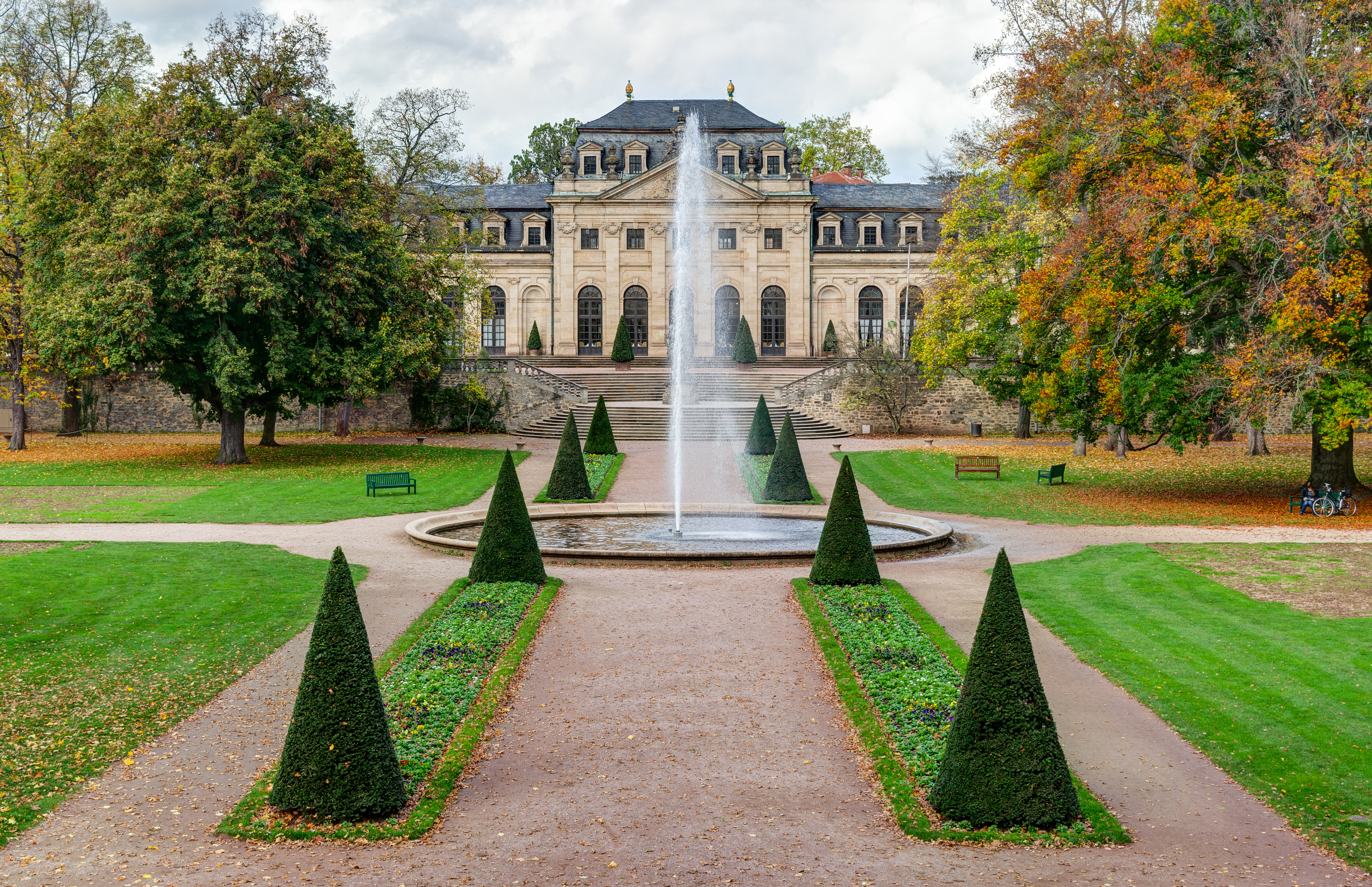
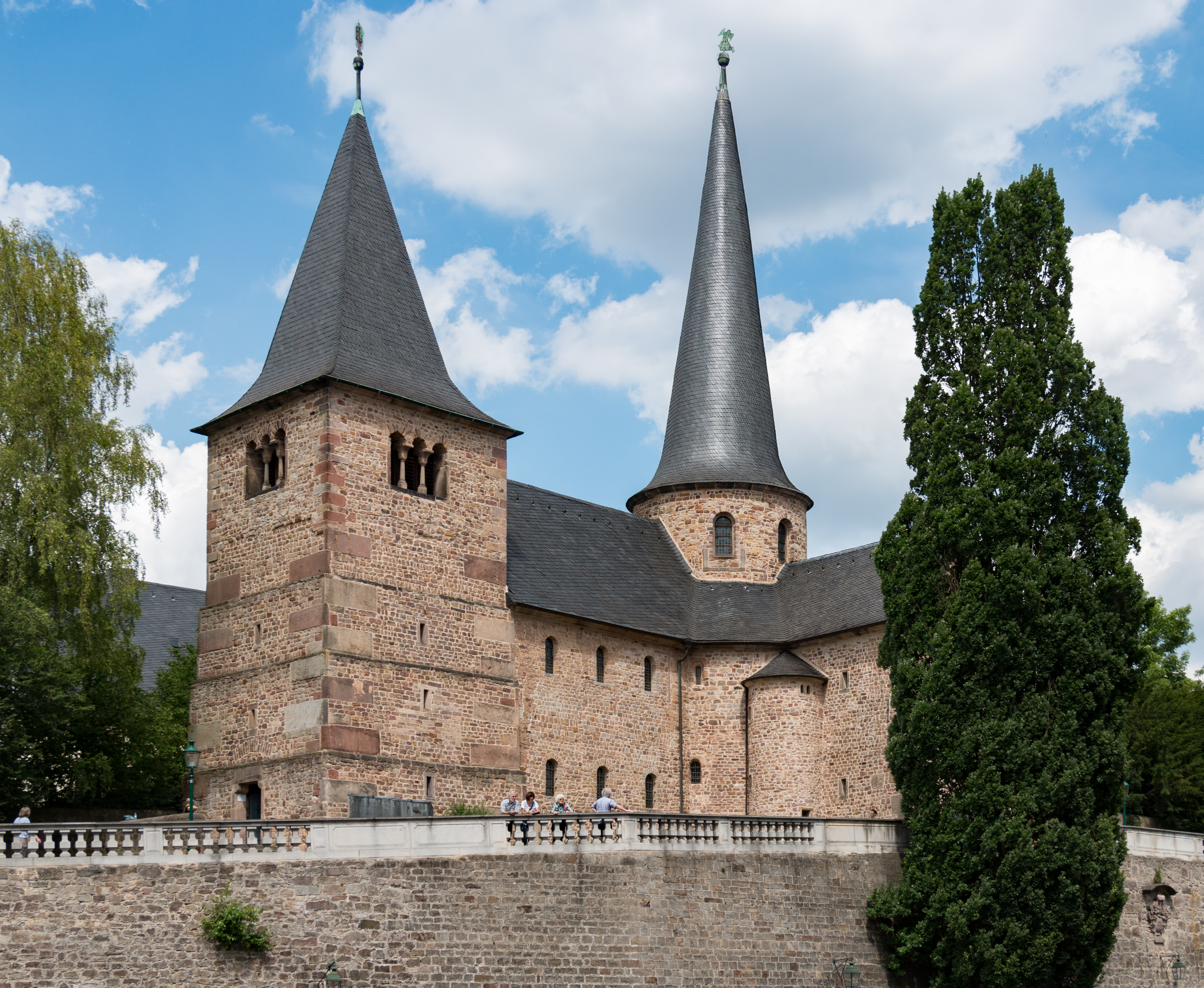
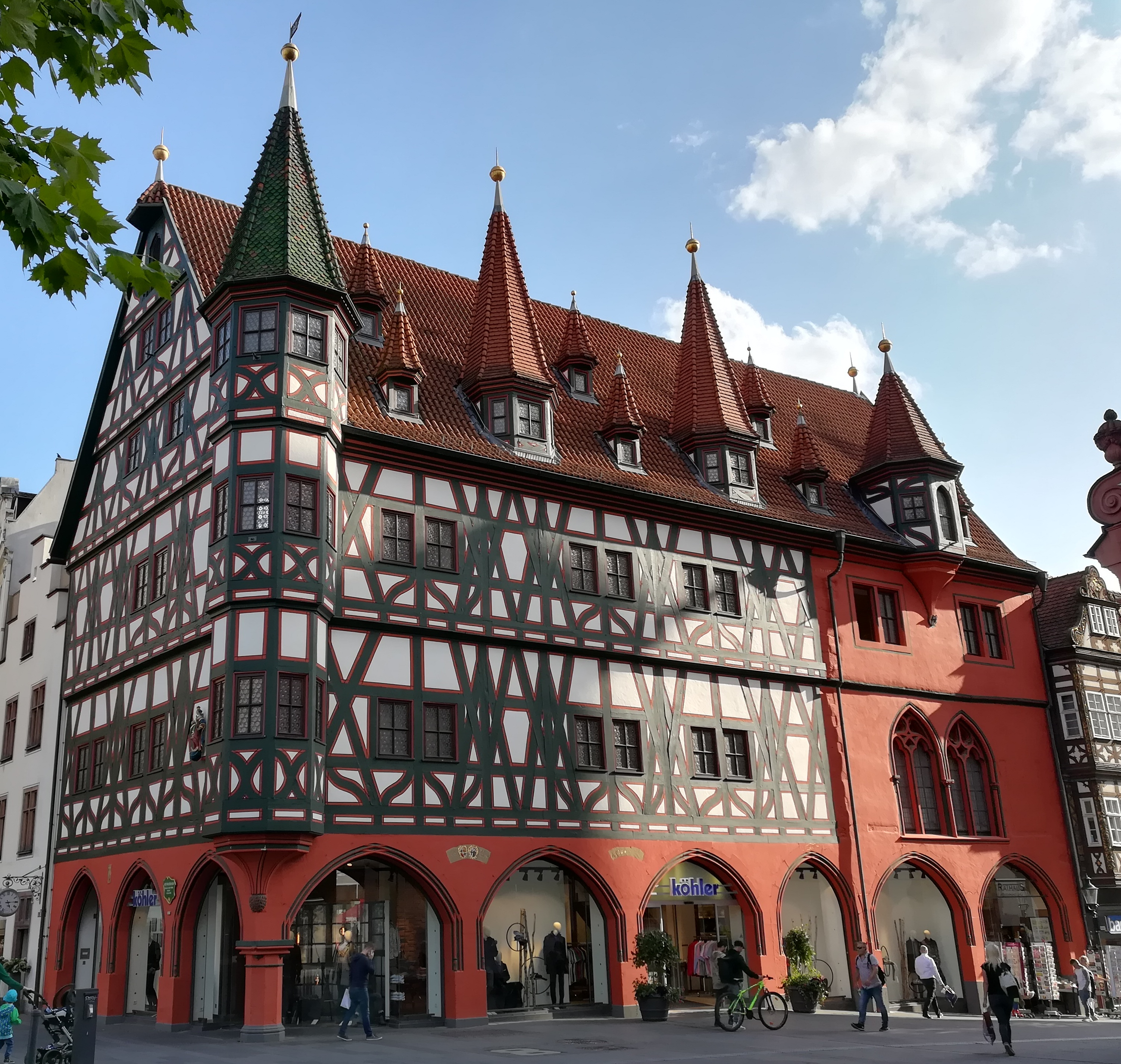
- Aerial view Fulda Cathedral City palace St. Michael's Church Old City Hall

- Coat of arms

- Location of Fulda within Fulda district
- Interactive map of Fulda
- Location within Germany Location within Hesse
- Coordinates: 50°33′3″N 9°40′31″E
- Country: Germany
- State: Hesse
- Admin. region: Kassel
- District: Fulda
- Founded: 744

Government
  - Mayor (2021–27): Dr. Heiko Wingenfeld (CDU)

Area
  - Total: 104.05 km^{2} (40.17 sq mi)
- Elevation: 261 m (856 ft)

Population (2025-12-31)
  - Total: 65,755
  - Density: 631.96/km^{2} (1,636.8/sq mi)
- Time zone: UTC+01:00 (CET)
  - Summer (DST): UTC+02:00 (CEST)
- Postal codes: 36001–36043
- Dialling codes: 0661
- Vehicle registration: FD
- Website: www.fulda.de

Fulda (German pronunciation: [ˈfʊlda]; historically in English called Fuld) is a city in Hesse, Germany, on the river Fulda and is the administrative seat of the Fulda district (Kreis).

== History ==
=== Middle Ages ===
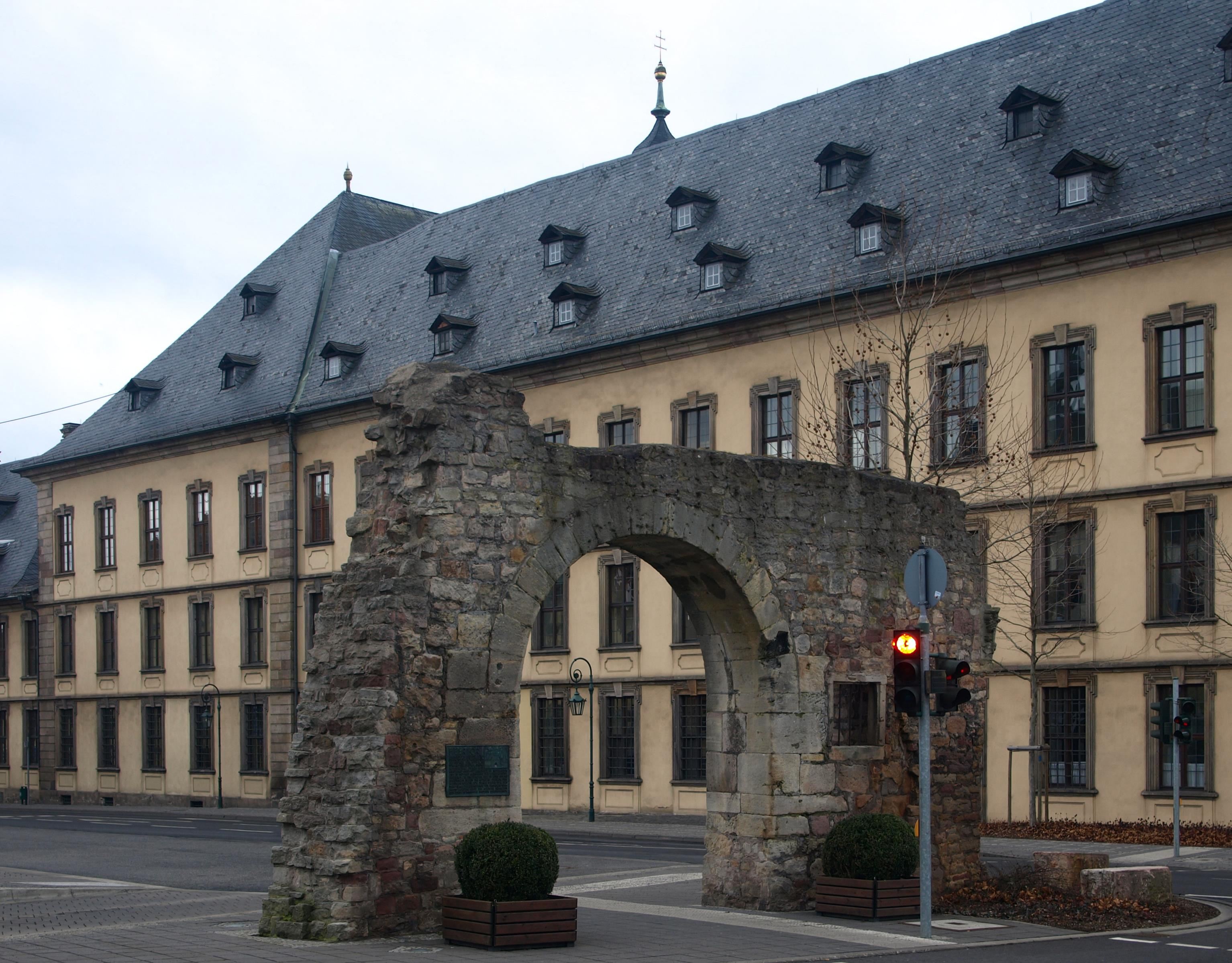
The army gate, built around 1150, on the city side of the city palace, from which you walked past the abbot's castle out of the city to get to the Via Regia

In 744 Saint Sturm, a disciple of Saint Boniface, founded the Benedictine monastery of Fulda as one of Boniface's outposts in the reorganization of the church in Germany. The initial grant for the abbey was signed by Carloman, Mayor of the Palace in Austrasia (in office 741–47), the son of Charles Martel. The support of the Mayors of the Palace, and later of the early Pippinid and Carolingian rulers, was important to Boniface's success. Fulda also received support from many of the leading families of the Carolingian world. Sturm, abbot from 747 until 779, was most likely related to the Agilolfing dukes of Bavaria.

Fulda also received large and constant donations from the Etichonids, a leading family in Alsace, and from the Conradines, predecessors of the Salian Holy Roman Emperors. Under Sturm, the donations Fulda received from these and other important families helped in the establishment of daughter-houses near Fulda. In 751, Boniface and his disciple and successor Lullus obtained an exemption for Fulda, having it placed directly under the Papal See and making it independent of interference by bishops or worldly princes. The monastery school became a renowned center of learning.

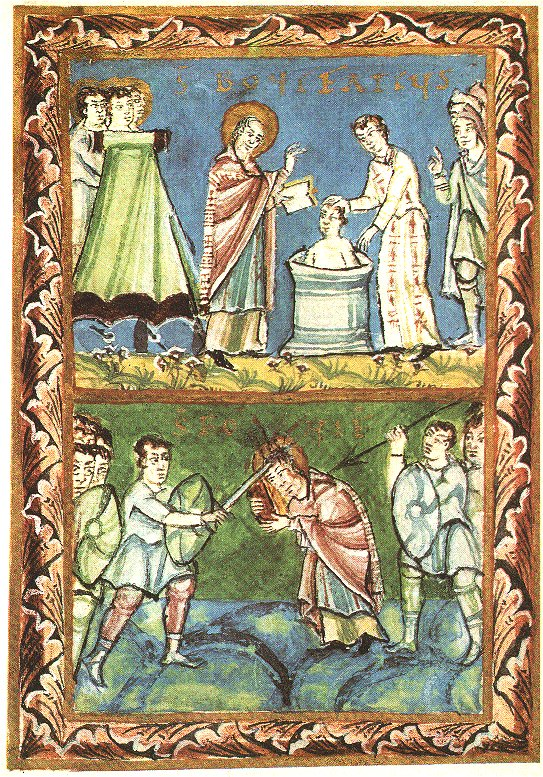
St Boniface baptizing and undergoing martyrdom – from the Sacramentary of Fulda

After his martyrdom by the Frisians in 754, the relics of Saint Boniface were brought back to Fulda. Because of the stature this afforded the monastery, the donations increased, and Fulda could establish daughter-houses further away, for example in Hamelin. Meanwhile, Saint Lullus, successor of Boniface as archbishop of Mainz, tried to absorb the abbey into his archbishopric, but failed.

Between 790 and 819 the community rebuilt the main abbey church to more fittingly house the relics. They based their new basilica on the original 4th-century (since demolished) Old St. Peter's Basilica in Rome, using the transept and crypt plan of that great pilgrimage church to frame their own saint as the "Apostle of the Germans".

The crypt of the original abbey church still holds those relics, but the church itself has been subsumed into a Baroque renovation. A small, 9th-century chapel remains standing within walking distance of the church, as do the foundations of a later women's abbey. Rabanus Maurus served as abbot at Fulda from 822 to 842. Fulda Abbey owned such works as the Res Gestae by the fourth-century Roman historian Ammianus Marcellinus and the Codex Fuldensis, as well as works by Cicero, Servius, Bede and Sulpicius Severus.

On Christmas day of 1235, five young boys died in a house fire. Locals largely accused the Jewish population of blood libel, stating that they had killed them to use their blood for ritual purposes. The Jews in the city were tortured, and after two confessed to stop their torture, 34 Jews were killed. Frederick II, Holy Roman Emperor called upon Jewish scholars and investigated the blood libel, and determined that the Jews were innocent, posthumously acquitting those who had been killed and exonerating the surviving members of the community.

=== Counter-Reformation ===
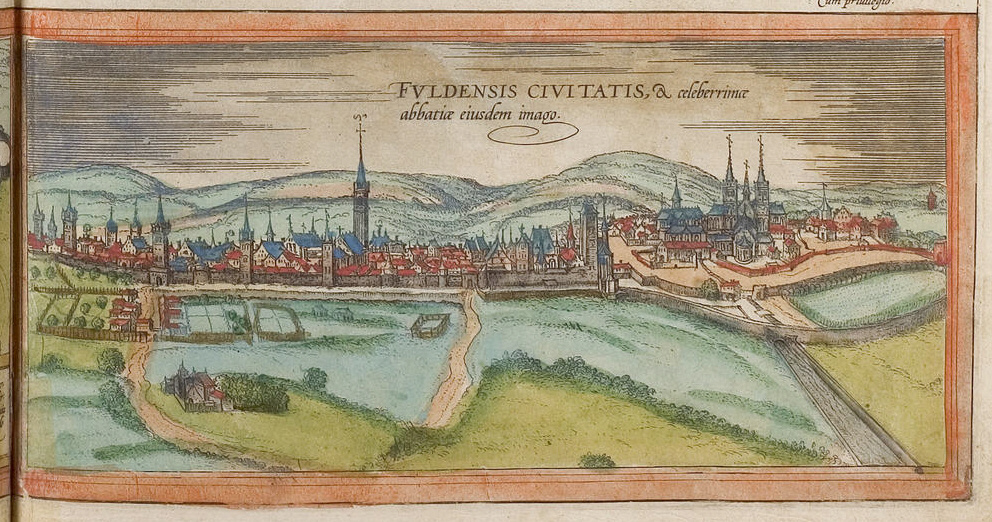
Fulda in the 16th century

Prince-abbot Balthasar von Dernbach adopted a policy of Counter-Reformation. In 1571 he called in the Jesuits to found a school and college. He insisted the members of the chapter should return to a monastic form of life. Whereas his predecessors had tolerated Protestantism, resulting in most of the citizenry of Fulda and a large portion of the principality's countryside professing Lutheranism, Balthasar ordered his subjects either to return to the Catholic faith or leave his territories. He also ordered the Fulda witch trials, in which hundreds of people, including a number of crypto-Protestants were arrested on charges of witchcraft alongside others.

=== 18th and 19th centuries ===
The foundation of the abbey of Fulda and its territory originated with an Imperial grant and the sovereign principality therefore was subject only to the German emperor. Fulda became a bishopric in 1752 and the prince-abbots were given the additional title of prince-bishop. The prince-abbots (and later prince-bishops) ruled Fulda and the surrounding region until the bishopric was forcibly dissolved by Napoleon I in 1802.

The city went through a baroque building campaign in the 18th century, resulting in the current "Baroque City" status. This included a remodeling of Fulda Cathedral (1704–12) and of the Stadtschloss (Fulda Castle-Palace, 1707–12) by Johann Dientzenhofer. The city parish church, St Blasius, was built between 1771 and 1785. In 1764 a porcelain factory was started in Fulda under Prince-Bishop, Prince-Abbot Heinrich von Bibra, but in 1789, shortly after his death, it was closed down by his successor, Prince-Bishop, Prince-Abbot Adalbert von Harstall.

The city was given to Prince William Frederick of Orange-Nassau (the later King William I of the Netherlands) in 1803 (as part of the short-lived Principality of Nassau-Orange-Fulda) and was annexed to the Grand Duchy of Berg in 1806 and in 1809 to the Principality of Frankfurt. After the Congress of Vienna of 1814–15, most of the territory went to the Electorate of Hesse, which the Prussia annexed in 1866.

=== 20th century ===
From 1938 to 1943 Fulda was the location of a Nazi forced labour camp for Romani people.

Fulda lends its name to the Fulda Gap, a traditional east–west invasion route used by Napoleon I and others. During the Cold War it was presumed to be an invasion route for any conventional war between NATO and Soviet forces. Downs Barracks in Fulda was the headquarters of the American 14th Armored Cavalry Regiment, later replaced by the 11th Armored Cavalry Regiment. The cavalry had as many as 3,000 soldiers from the end of World War II until 1993. Not all those soldiers were in Fulda proper but scattered over observation posts and in the cities of Bad Kissingen and Bad Hersfeld. The strategic importance of this region, along the border between East and West Germany, led to a large United States and Soviet military presence.

The city hosted 30th and 63rd Hessentag state festival in 1990 and 2026 respectively.

== Politics ==
Fulda has traditionally been a conservative Catholic city, with the Roman Catholic Diocese of Fulda being based in the city cathedral. During the time of the German Empire and Weimar Republic, the city was a stronghold for the Centre Party. After the end of World War II, in addition to all mayors, Fulda's constituency seats have been safe seats for CDU in both the Landtag of Hesse (District X 1946–1950, District 14 1950–1983, Fulda I since 1983) and Bundestag (Fulda electoral district). The CDU has never received less than 42.4 percent of the vote in communal elections since 1946.

Oberbürgermeister (Lord mayor) Department I (head and personnel administration, finance, committee work, culture, business development, city marketing, investments)

- Cuno Raabe (CDU): 1946–1956
- Alfred Dregger (CDU): 1956–1970
- Dr. Wolfgang Hamberger (CDU): 1970–1998
- Dr. Alois Rhiel (CDU): 1998–2003
- Gerhard Möller (CDU): 2003–2015
- Heiko Wingenfeld (CDU): 2015–

Department II (public security and order, family, youth, schools, sports, social affairs, seniors)

- Karl Ehser: 1934–1945
- Karl Schmitt: 1946–1948
- Heinrich Gellings: 1948–1969
- Dr. Wolfgang Hamberger: 1969–1970
- Dr. Tilman Pünder: 1971–1980
- Lutz von Pufendorf: 1981–1984
- Dr. Alois Rhiel: 1984–1989
- Josef H. Mayer: 1990–1995
- Oda Scheibelhuber: 1995–1999
- Bernd Woide: 1999–2003
- Dr. Wolfgang Dippel: 2004–2014
- Dag Wehner (CDU): 2014–

Landtag (state parliament)

- Cuno Raabe (CDU): 1946–1962, elected in 1946, 1950, 1954 and 1958
- Alfred Dregger (CDU): 1962–1972, elected in 1962, 1966 and 1970, resigned to accept Bundestag mandate
- Winfried Rippert (CDU): 1972–1999, appointed in 1972, elected in 1974, 1978, 1982, 1983, 1987, 1991 and 1995
- Walter Arnold (CDU): 1999–2004 and again 2009–2018, elected in 1999, 2003; resigned in 2004; elected in 2009 and 2013
- Margarete Ziegler-Raschdorf (CDU): 2004–2009, appointed in 2004, elected in 2008
- Thomas Hering (CDU): 2018–, elected in 2018

Bundestag (federal parliament)

- Anton Sabel (CDU): 1949–1957, elected in 1949 and 1953
- Hermann Götz (CDU): 1957–1976, elected in 1957, 1961, 1965, 1969 and 1972
- Alfred Dregger (CDU): 1976–1998, elected in 1976, 1980, 1983, 1987, 1990 and 1994
- Martin Hohmann (CDU): 1998–2005, elected in 1998 and 2002; expelled from CDU in 2003 for antisemitic remarks
- Michael Brand (CDU): 2005–, elected in 2005, 2009, 2013, 2017, 2021 and 2025

Between 1927 and 1974, Fulda was a district-free city (Kreisfreie Stadt). Since 1974, it has been included in the eponymous district as a city with special status (Stadt mit Sonderstatus), a distinction it shares with six other Hessian cities, meaning that it takes on tasks more usually performed by the district.

== Transport ==
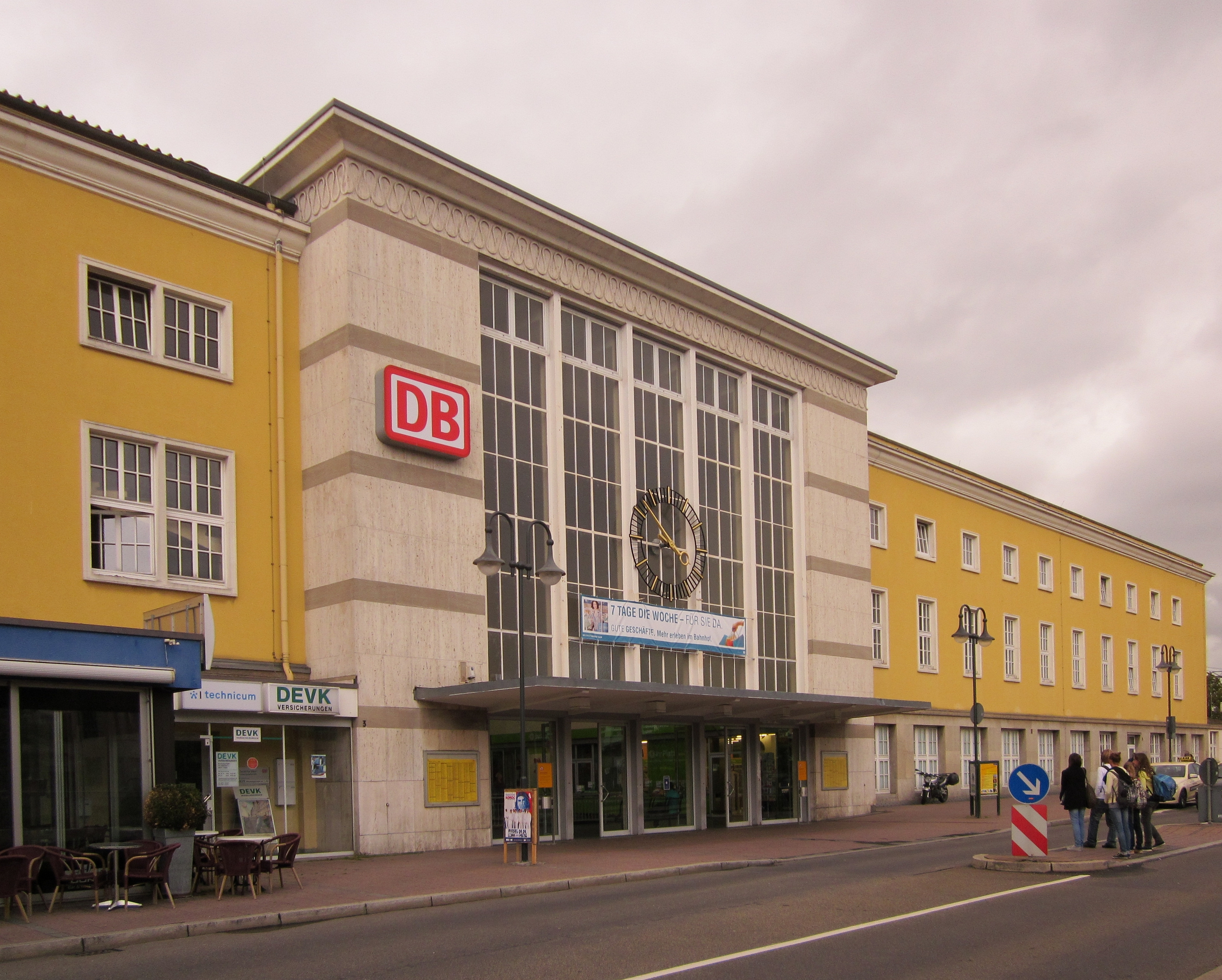
Main railway station

Fulda station is a transport hub and interchange point between local and long-distance traffic of the German railway network, and is classified by Deutsche Bahn as a category 2 station. It is on the Hanover–Würzburg high-speed railway; the North–South line (Nord-Süd-Strecke), comprising the Bebra–Fulda line north of Fulda, and the Kinzig Valley Railway and Fulda–Main Railway to the south; the Vogelsberg Railway, which connects to the hills of the Vogelsberg in the west; and the Fulda–Gersfeld Railway (Rhön Railway) to Gersfeld in the Rhön Mountains to the east.

Fulda is on the Bundesautobahn 7 (BAB 7). Bundesautobahn 66 starts at the interchange with the BAB 7, heading south towards Frankfurt. Fulda is also on the Bundesstraße 27.

The city doesn't have an airport. The nearest airport is Frankfurt Airport; it is located 114 km (71 mi) south west of Fulda.

== Twin towns – sister cities ==
Fulda is twinned with:

- Como, Italy (1960)
- Arles, France (1964)
- Sergiyev Posad, Russia (1991)
- Wilmington, Delaware, United States (1997)
- Litoměřice, Czech Republic (2001)
- Dokkum, Netherlands (2013)

== Notable people ==
=== Pre-1800 ===
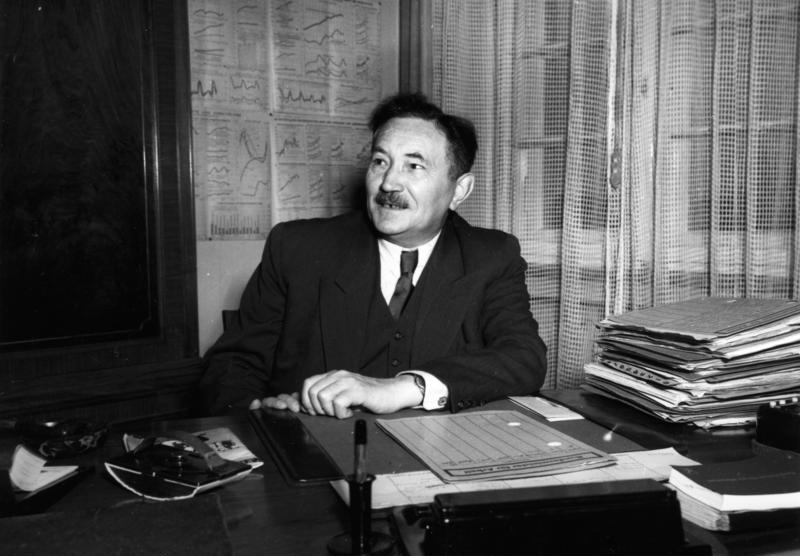
Anton Storch

- Adam of Fulda (c. 1445–1505), composer and music theorist
- Adam Krafft (1493–1558), Protestant church reformer
- Justus Menius (1499–1558), theologian
- Franz Kaspar Lieblein (1744–1810), botanist
- Heinrich von Bibra Prince-Bishop, Prince-Abbot and of Fulda from 1759 to 1788

=== 1801–1850 ===
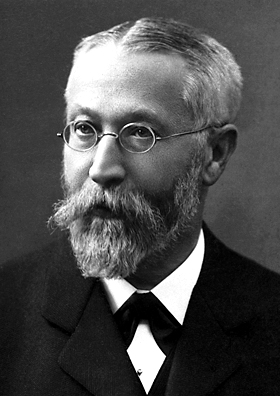
Ferdinand Braun

- Georg von Adelmann (1811–1888), physician and surgeon
- Otto Bähr (1817–1895), lawyer and politician
- Hugo Staehle (1826–1848), composer
- Ferdinand Braun (1850–1918), physicist, electrical engineer and Nobel laureate in physics

=== 1851–1900 ===
- Adalbert Ricken (1851–1921), mycologist and priest
- Ludwig Hupfeld (1864–1949), instrument maker and industrialist
- Wilhelm Heye (1869–1947), officer
- Clara Harnack (1877–1962), painter, teacher and mother of the resistance fighters Arvid and Falk Harnack
- Angela Zigahl (1885–1955), politician
- Anton Storch (1892–1975), politician
- Wilm Hosenfeld (1895–1952), officer and Righteous Among the Nations
- Paul Deichmann (1898–1981), officer of the Luftwaffe
- Max Stern (1898–1982), businessman, investor and philanthropist

=== 1901–1950 ===
- Karl Storch (1913–1992), athlete (hammer thrower)
- Wilhelm Balthasar (1914–1941), Luftwaffe military aviator and wing commander during Spanish Civil War and WWII
- Martin Hohmann (born 1948), politician (CDU, now AfD)
- Winfried Michel (born 1948), composer, recorder player and music publisher

=== 1951–present ===
- Markus Oestreich (born 1963), racing driver
- Immanuel Bloch (born 1972), physicist
- Tobias Sammet (born 1977), musician
- Sebastian Kehl (born 1980), football player
- Patrik Sinkewitz (born 1980), professional cyclist
- Tobias Wolf (born 1988), football player
- Thorsten Hohmann (born 1979), pool player
- Damien Haas (born 1990), internet personality and voice actor
- Jamal Musiala (born 2003), football player
- Josh Harris (born 1989)

American football player

== Gallery ==
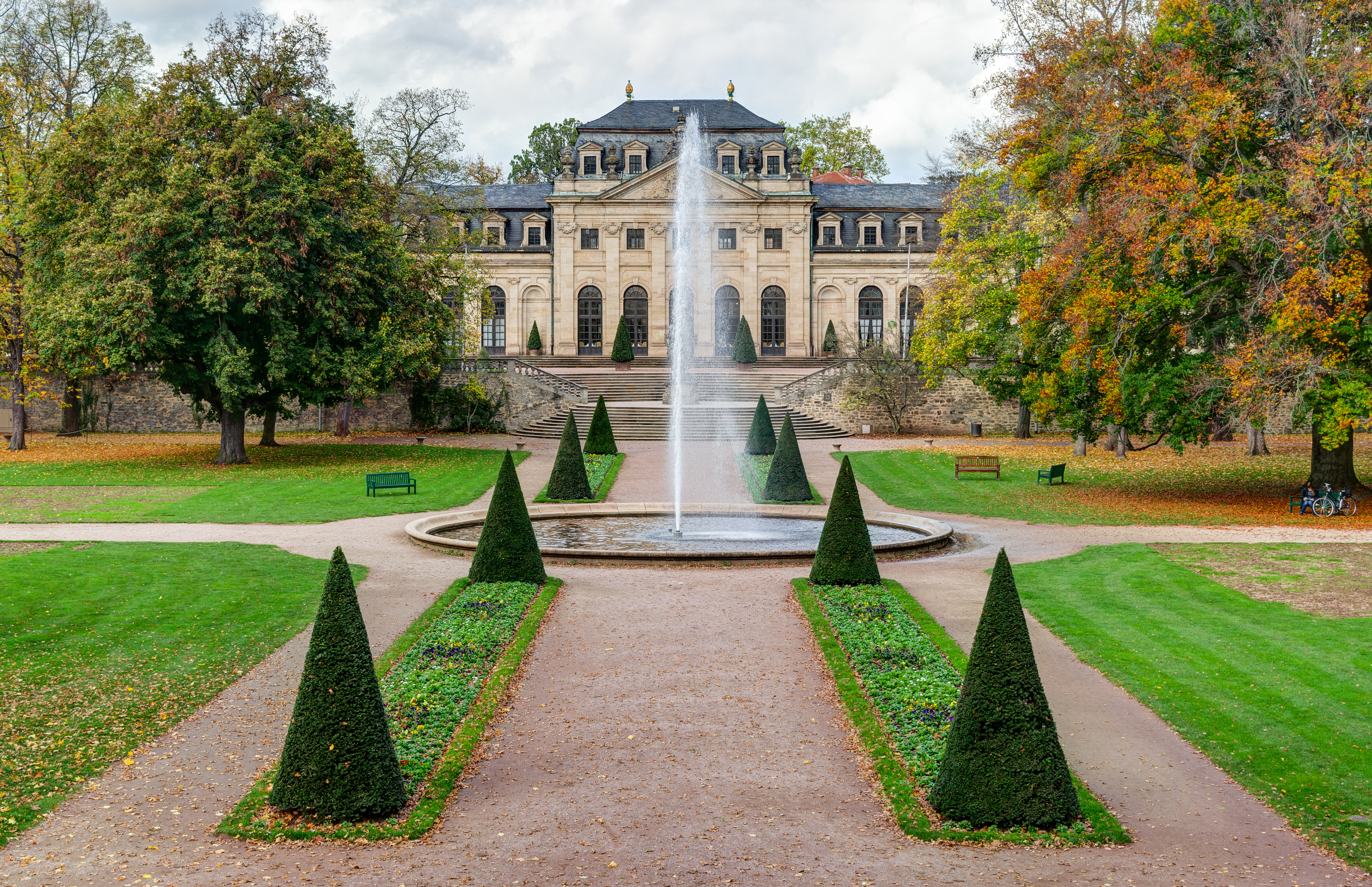
City palace garden

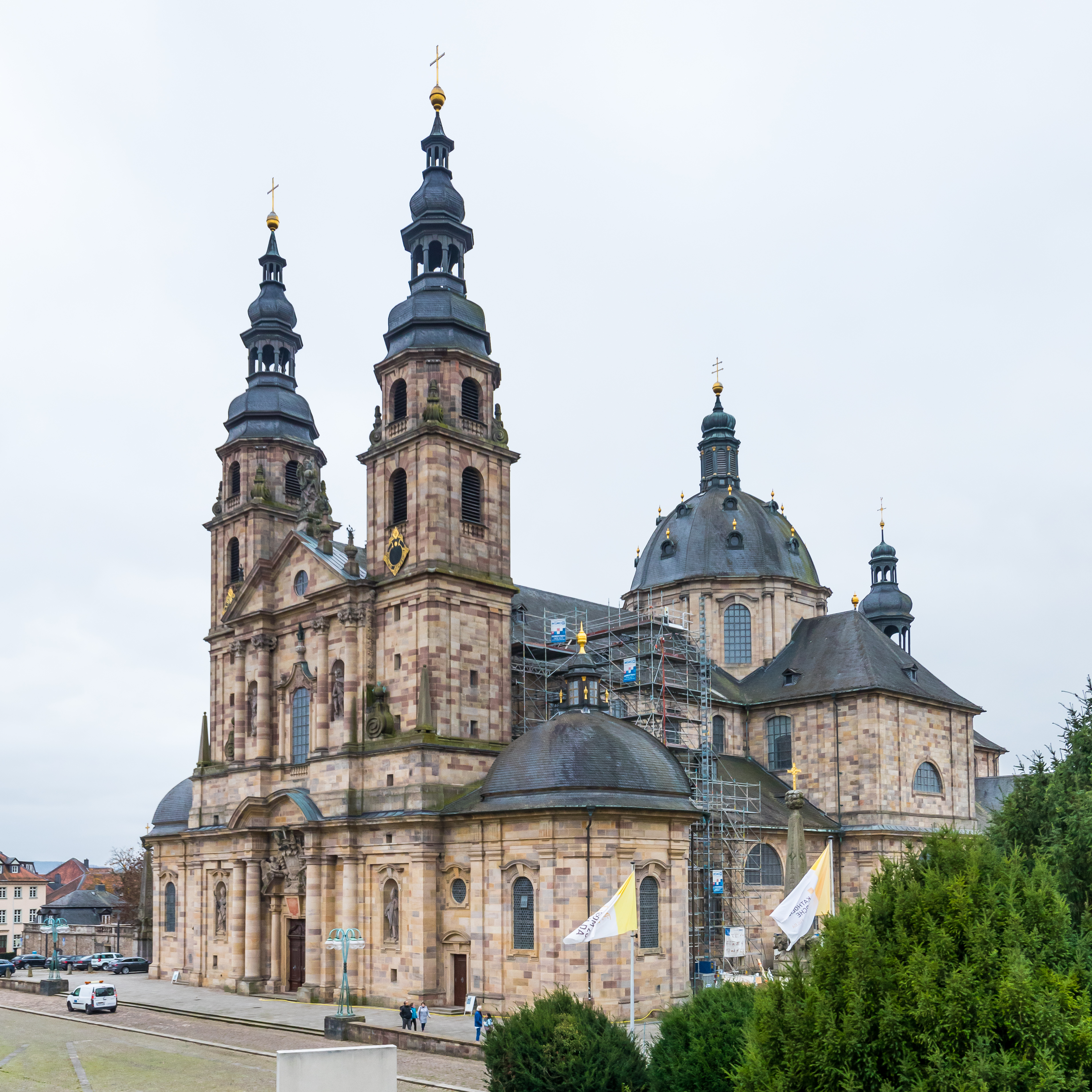
Fulda Cathedral

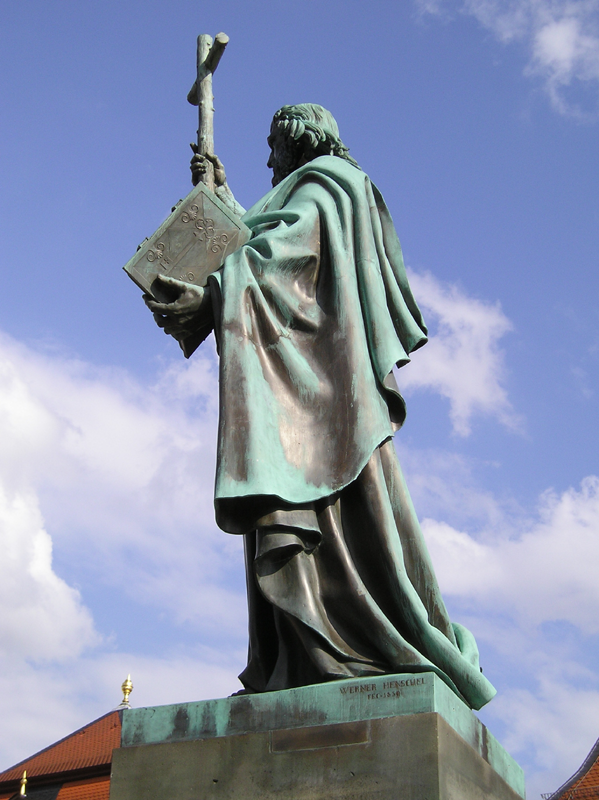
Statue of Saint Boniface (1830) in Fulda

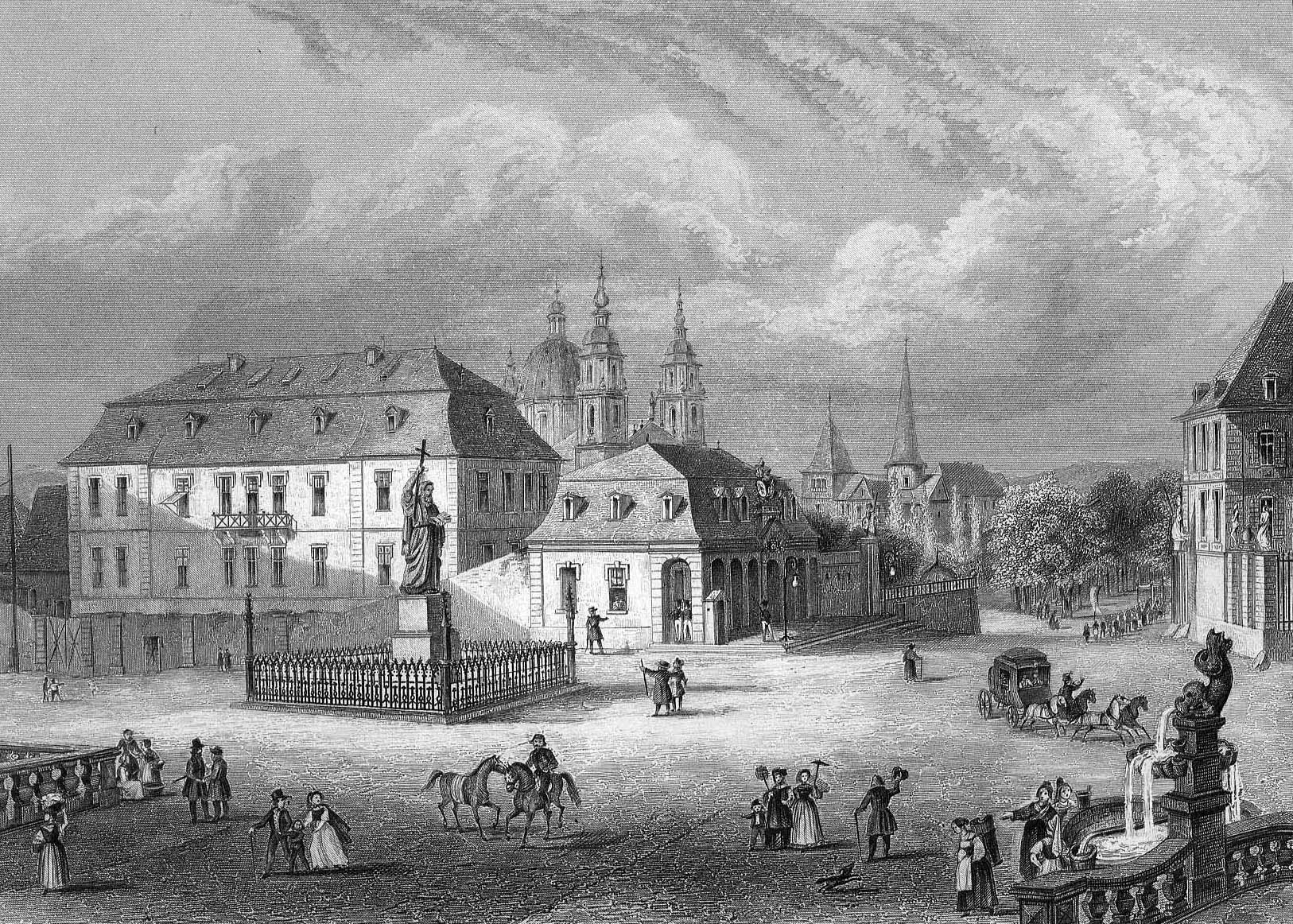
Fulda in 1850

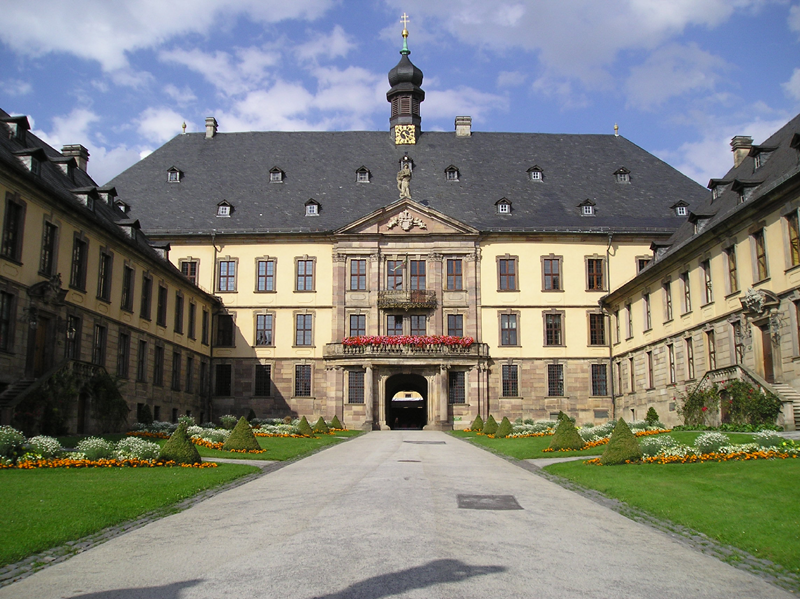
Entrance of the Stadtschloss (City Palace)

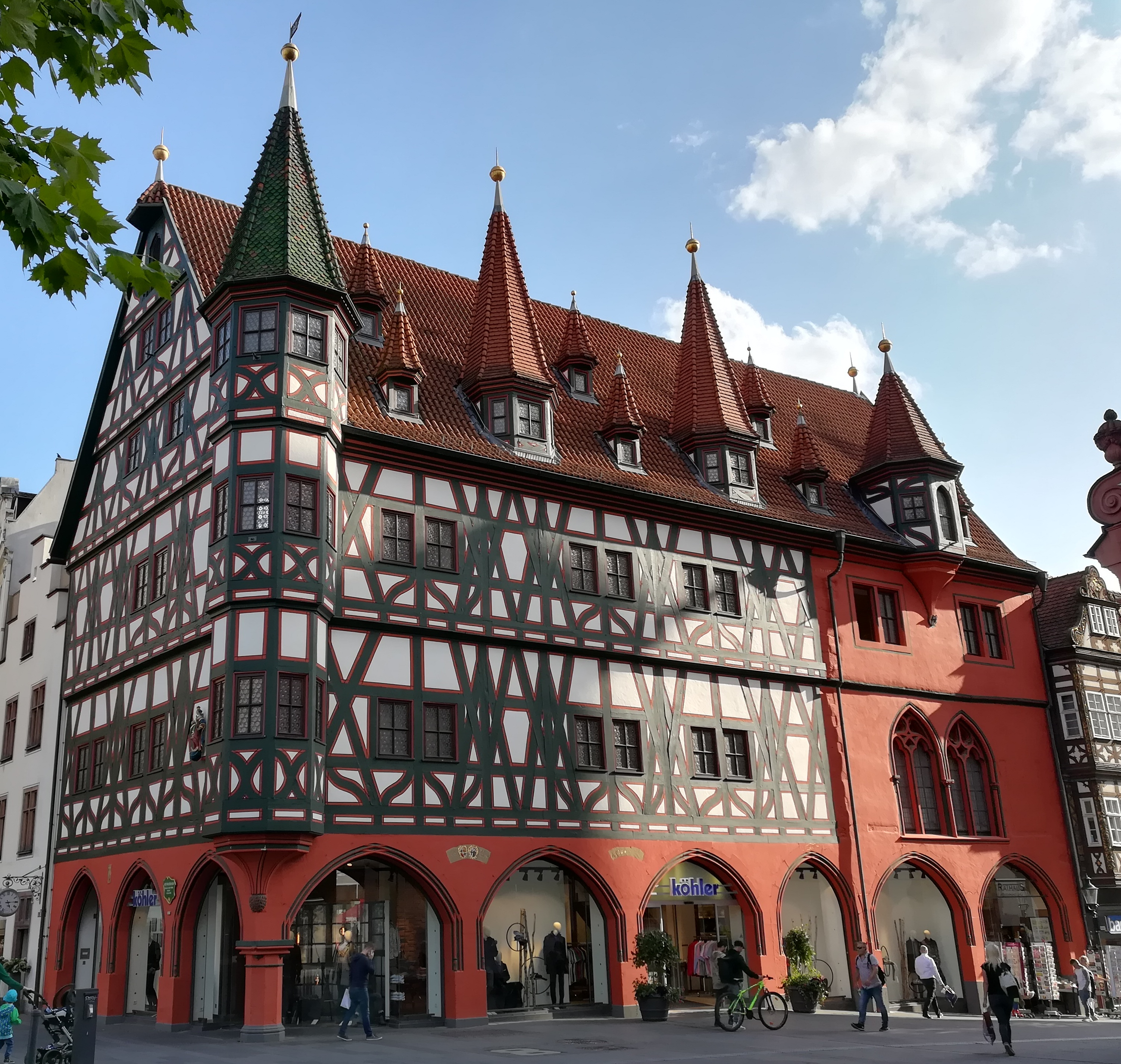
Old City Hall

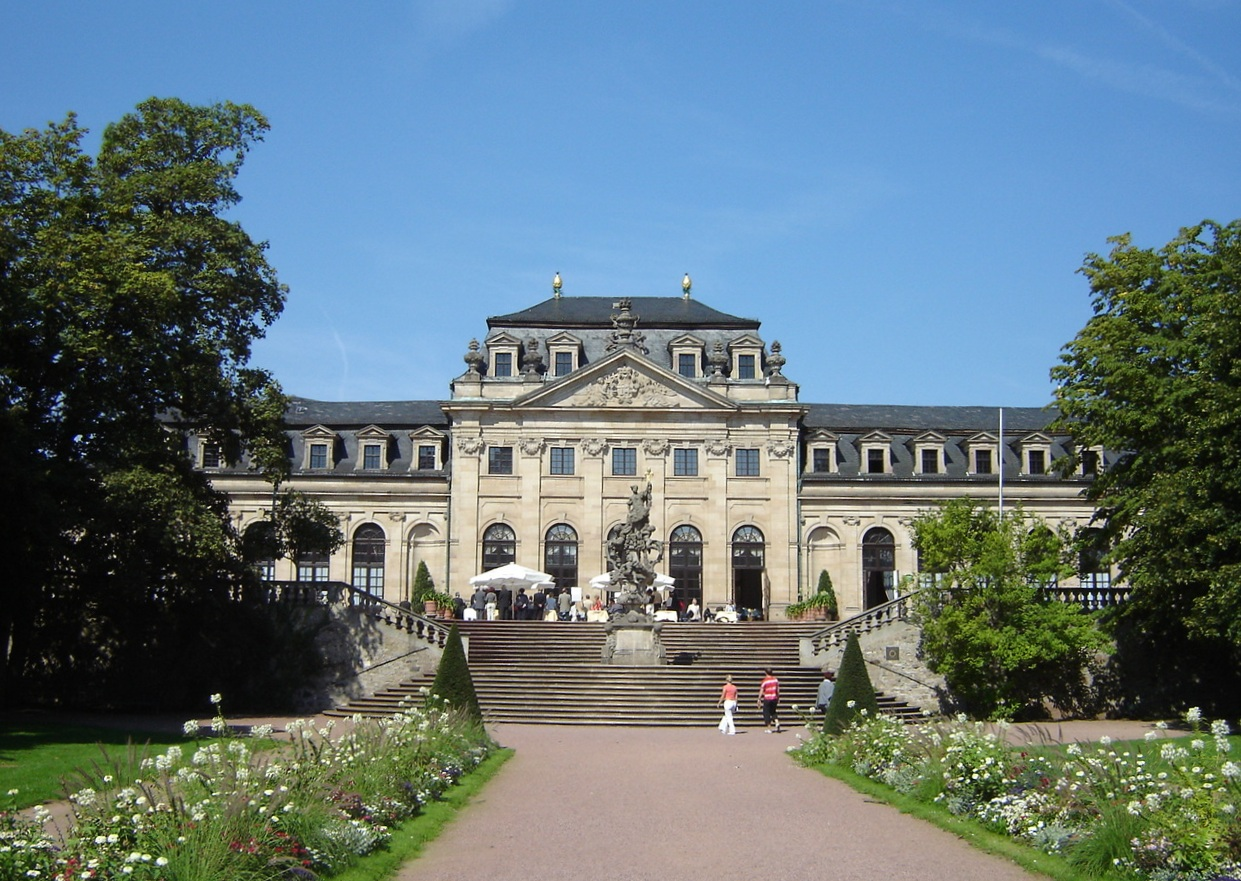
Orangerie

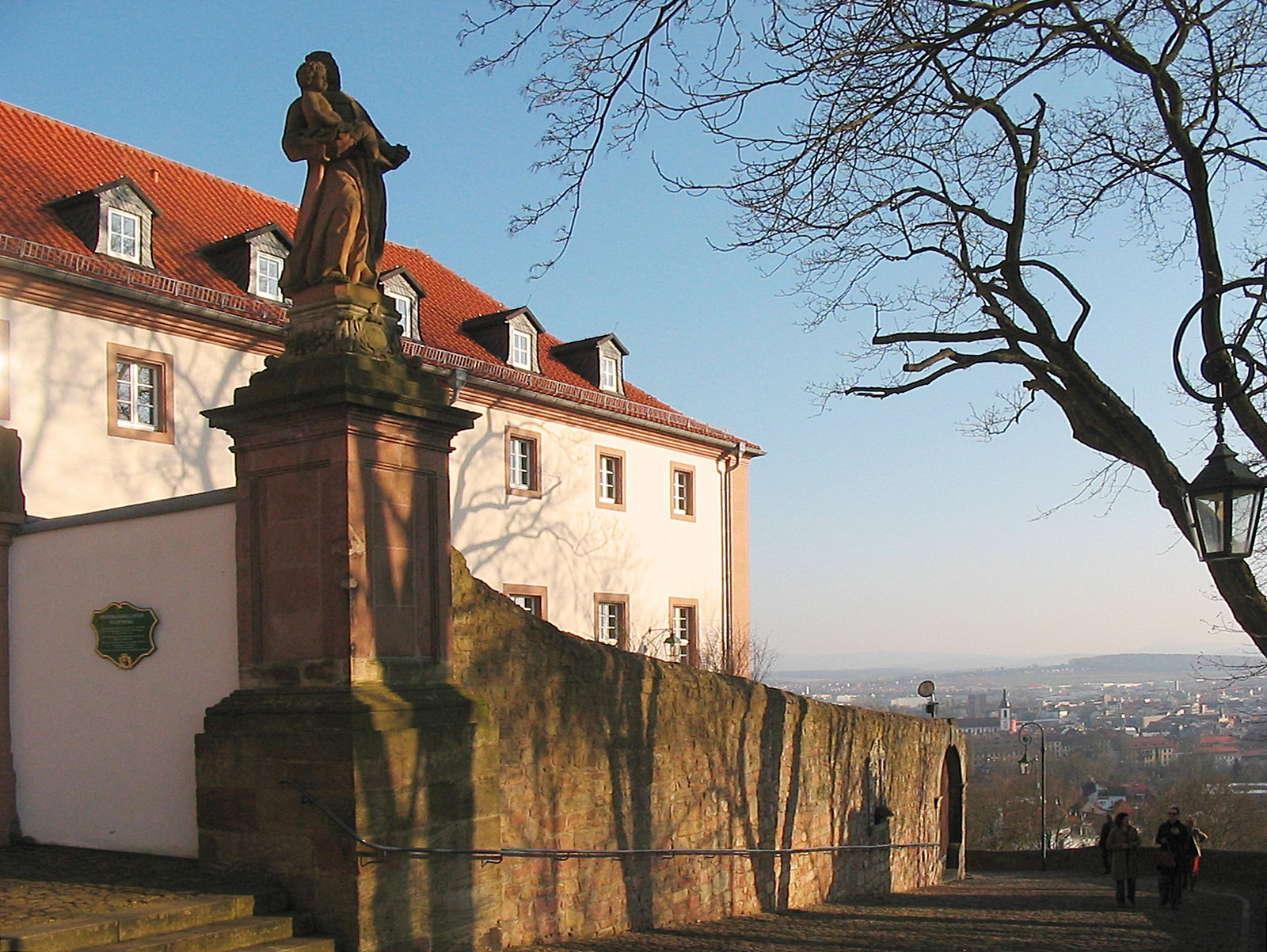
Kloster Frauenberg (Fulda), a Franciscan monastery

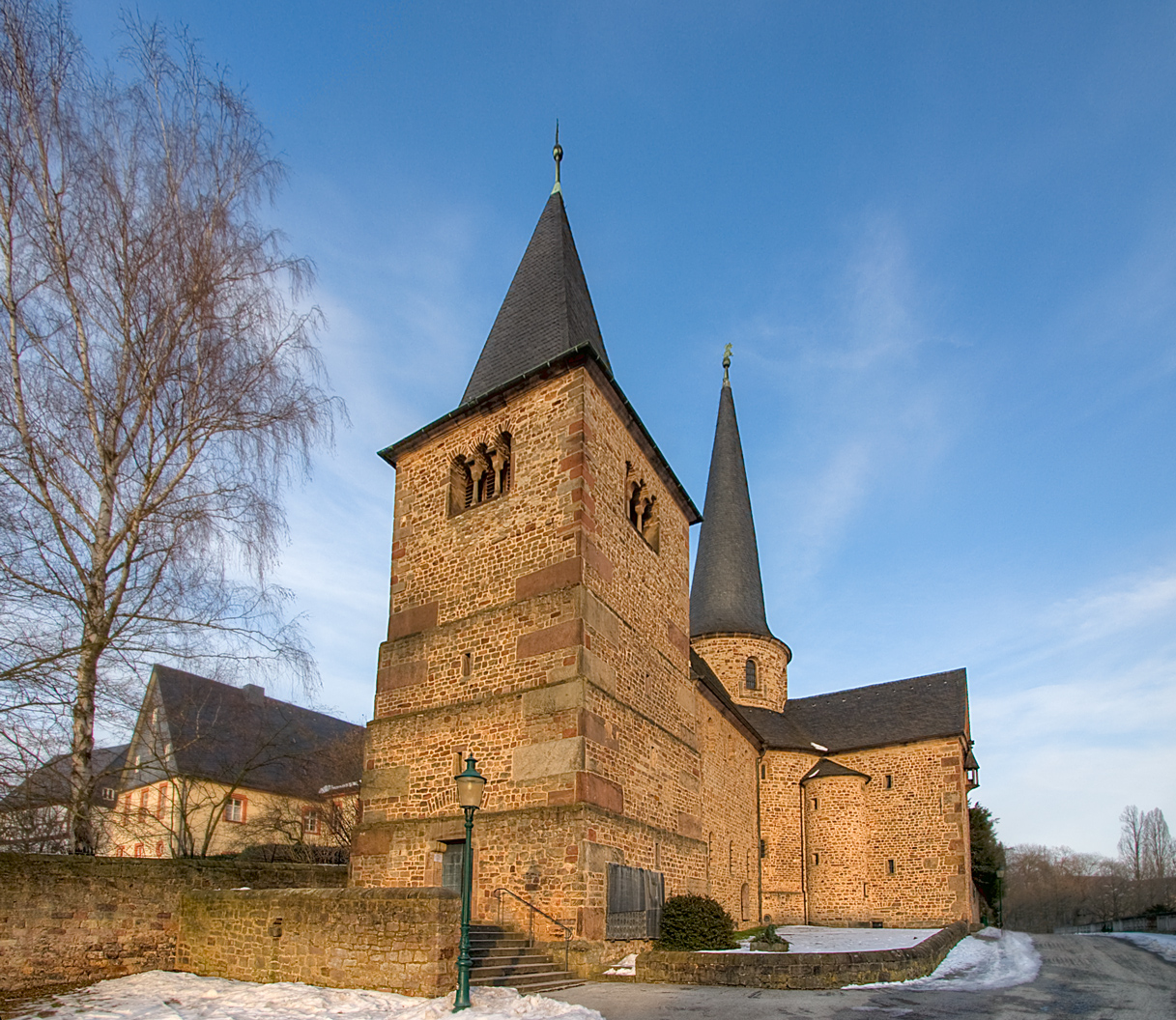
St. Michael's Church

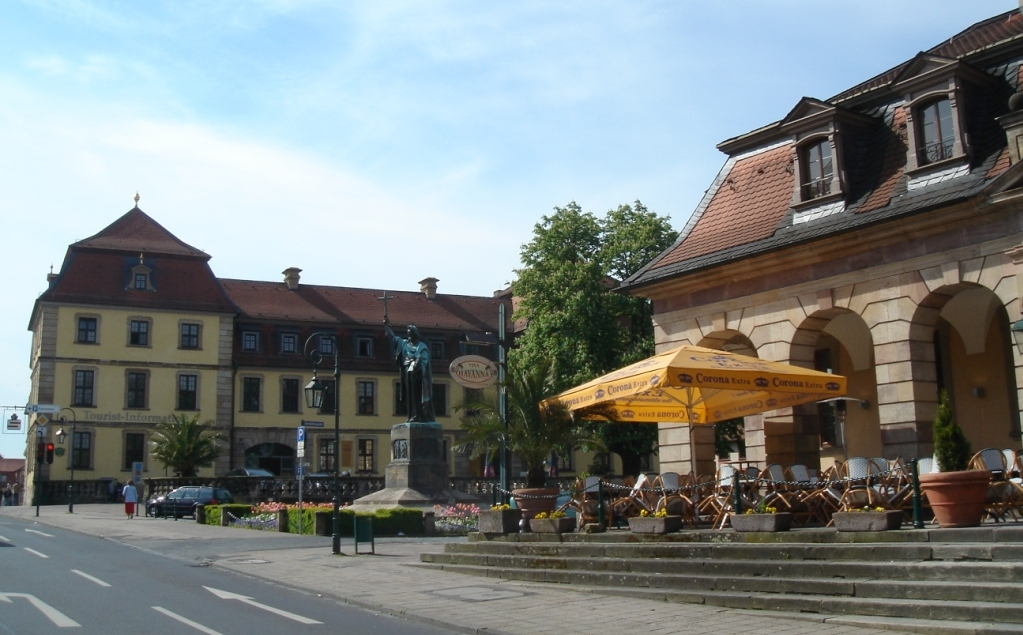
Baroque Adelspalais

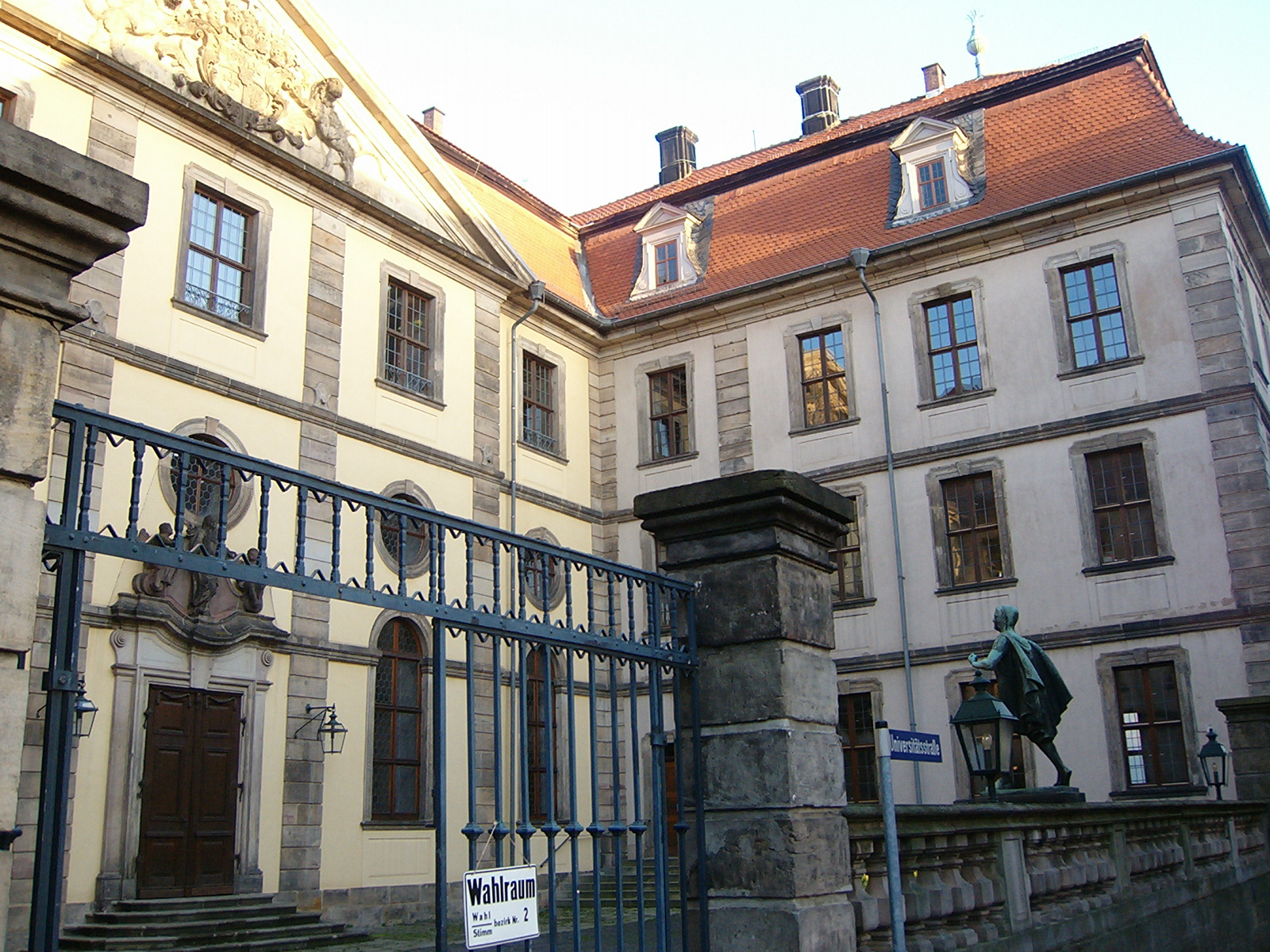
Old University of Fulda: Adolphs-Universität Fulda, today the Adolf von Dalberg School

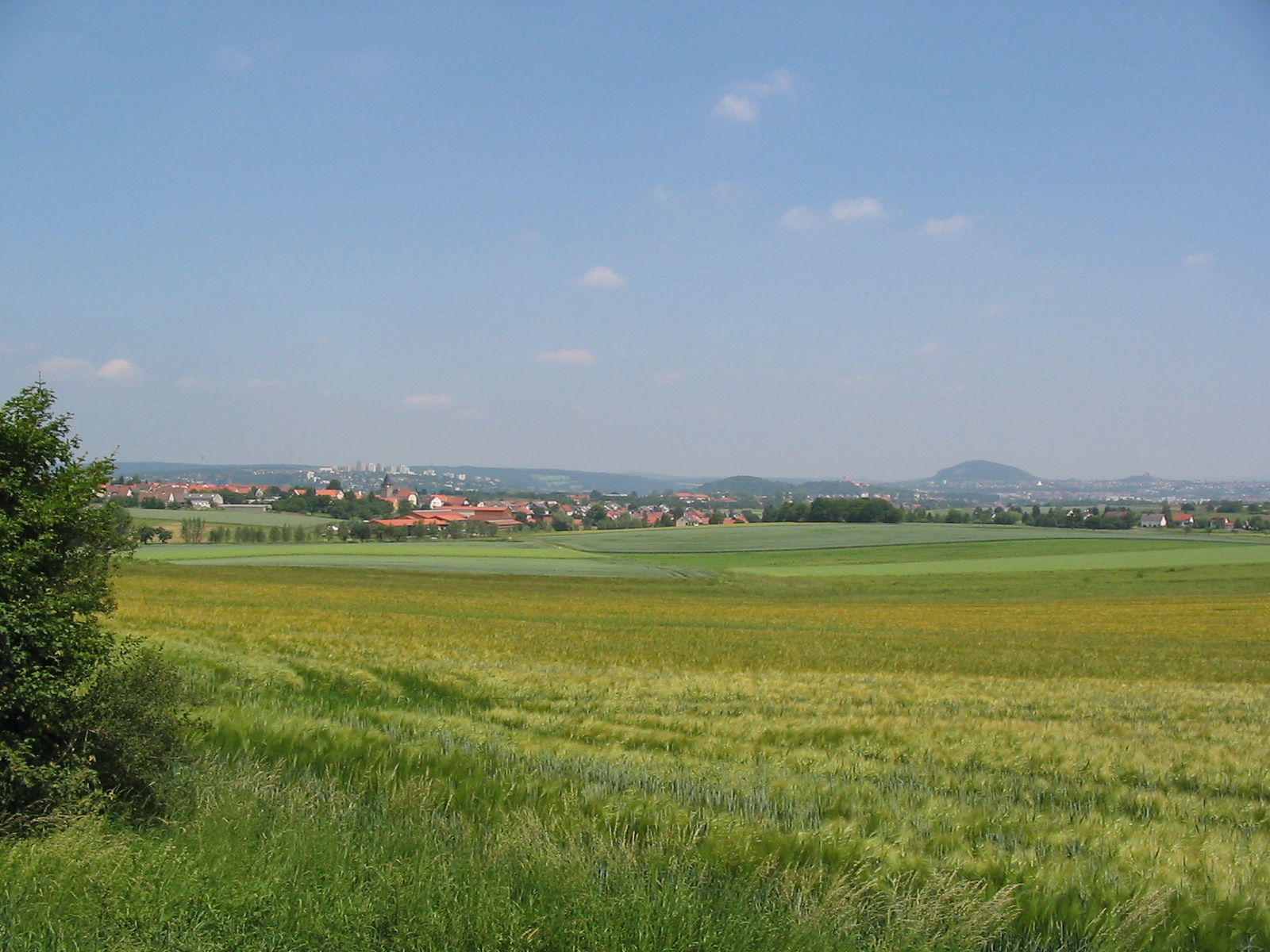
Looking east toward Fulda over the rich farmlands

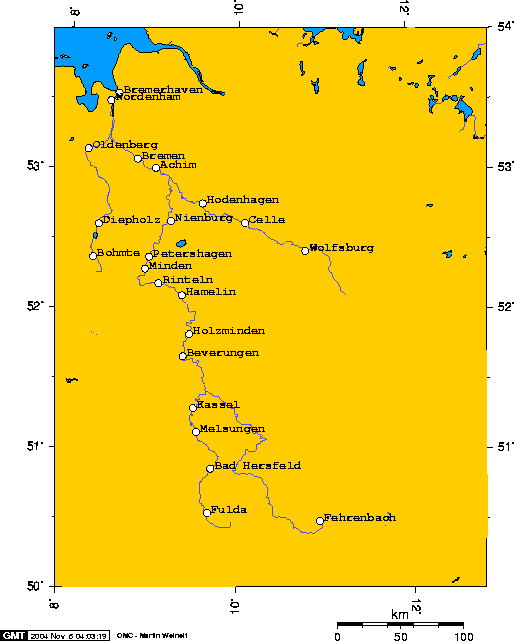
Weser river watershed, showing Fulda river and the city of Fulda

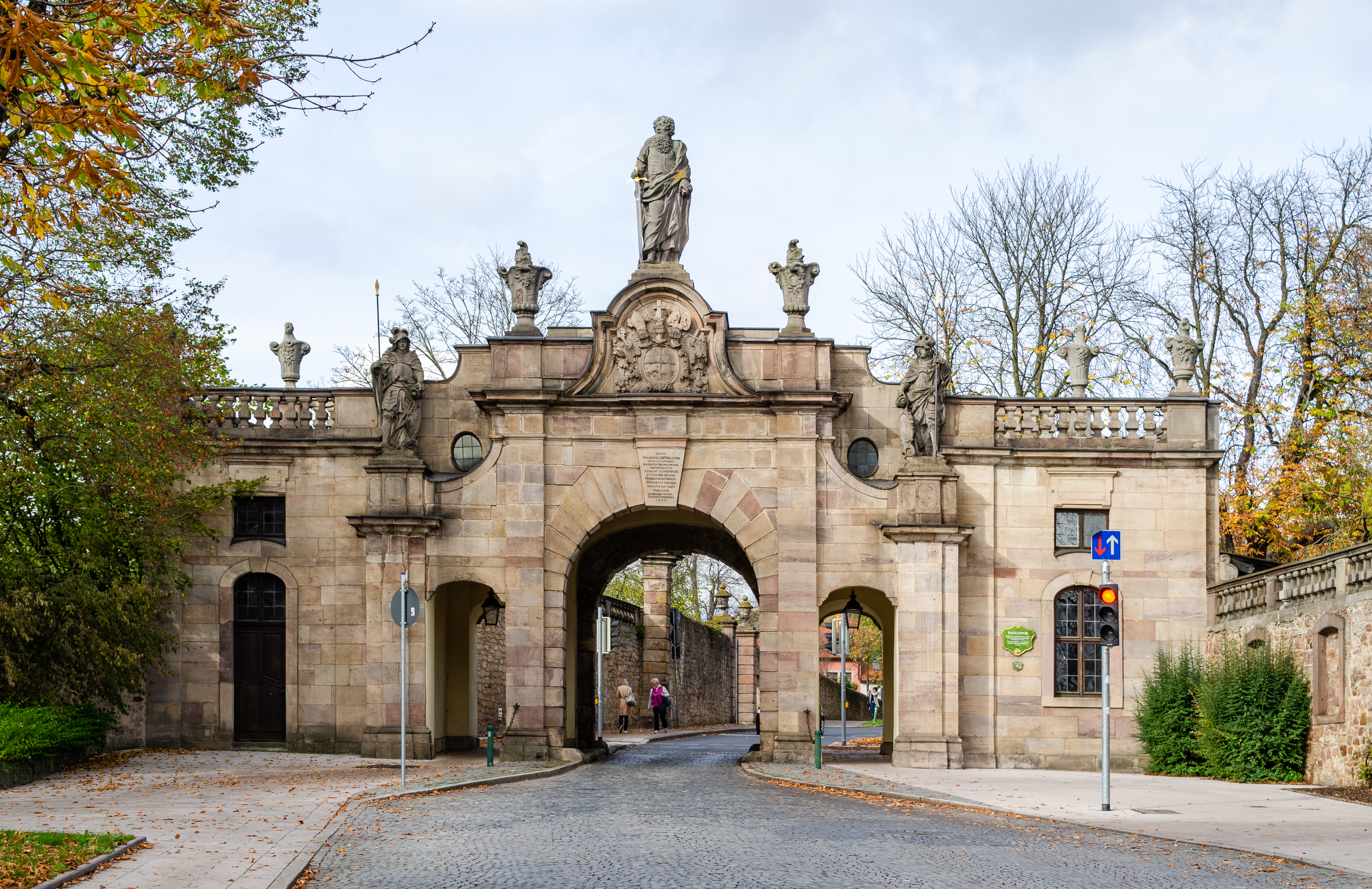
St. Paul's Gate, viewed from the south

== See also ==
- Fulda Cathedral
- Fulda Gap
