= Martin Hohmann =

German lawyer and politician (born 1948)

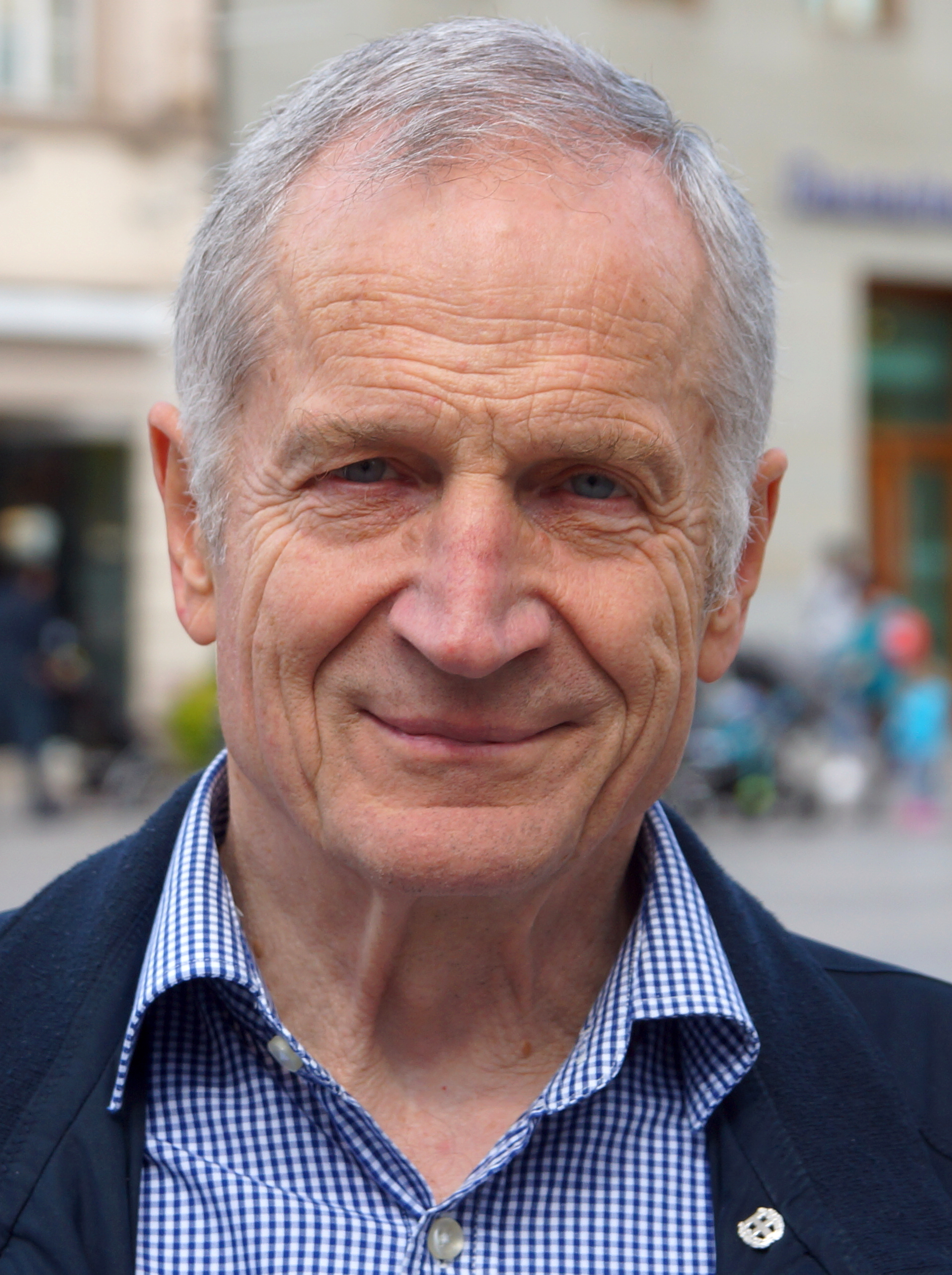
- Hohmann in 2017

Member of the Bundestag; from Hesse
- In office 24 October 2017 – 26 October 2021
- Constituency: State list
- In office 26 October 1998 – 18 October 2005
- Preceded by: Alfred Dregger
- Succeeded by: Michael Brand
- Constituency: Fulda

Mayor of Neuhof
- In office 1984–1998
- Preceded by: Karl Heimüller
- Succeeded by: Maria Schultheis (1999)

Personal details
- Born: 4 February 1948 (age 78) Fulda, West Germany
- Party: Alternative for Germany (since 2016)
- Other political affiliations: CDU (1980–2003); Independent (2003–2016)
- Children: 3
- Education: Fulda monastery school
- Occupation: Lawyer

Martin Hohmann (born 4 February 1948) is a German lawyer and politician of the AfD party. He was a member of the German Parliament ("Bundestag") for the centre-right Christian Democratic Union (CDU), from 1998 until 2005. From 2017 to 2021, he was again a member of the German Parliament for the AfD.

== Speech on German Unity Day 2003 ==
He attracted public attention with a speech on German Unity Day on 3 October 2003. He set out to repudiate the supposed accusation that during the Holocaust, the Germans were considered a "nation of perpetrators" (German: Tätervolk, a term which was later named German Un-Word of the Year by a jury of linguistic scholars). He alleges involvement of Jews in the 1917 Russian Revolution.

Hohmann starts from noting a strong sense of self-contempt among Germans and quotes Hans-Olaf Henkel, the vice president of the Federation of German Industry, who has stated that "Our original sin paralyzes the country". Hohmann thinks that an undue occupation with Germany's past—which he distinguishes from a necessary admission and remembrance of German crimes—lies behind discrimination against fellow-countrymen. Among examples, he mentions the refusal of German government officials to consider demanding compensations by Russia, Poland and the Czech Republic on behalf of forced German labourers in World War II, in the same way as Germany pays compensation for those they forced to labor camps.

== Political consequences ==
The speech was delivered to 120 people in his constituency on 3 October. It attracted no attention until it was later found on the internet. This led to a lively debate in public and in the CDU, and after Hohmann refused to retract the speech, he was expelled from the parliamentary group of the CDU in the Bundestag in 2003 and from the party itself in 2004. The former decision, however, came only after almost two weeks, on 15 November, raising some concerns that the party did not share the zeal of his critics. CDU MPs voted 195 to 28 (16 abstained) to eject him from the party group, that is 81 percent favored ejection. According to The Independent, support for free speech was far higher than expected. Hohmann appealed the party decision in court, but his expulsion was upheld. The Kammergericht Berlin ruled that the accusation that Hohmann "supported antisemitic tendencies as his own or in any case facilitated them in parts of the audience by providing facts for such appraisal" was in line with the core statements of the speech.

While most of the German elite was unanimous in condemning Hohmann, the public was much less convinced—polls indicated that equally many opposed the expulsion as those who approved of it (a little over 40 percent in each camp). Although party spokesmen were quick to condemn the speech, some party leaders said in private conversations that Hohmann did not deserve to be expelled. The decision to expel him met severe criticism from party rank-and-files. CDU officials in the Ruhr town of Recklinghausen joined the protests by displaying a banner from the local party office. It read: "Nobody in Germany is allowed to tell the truth any more".

He kept his seat as an independent member of parliament until the next Bundestag election of 2005. There, Hohmann ran unsuccessfully for a seat as an independent candidate. He received 21.5% of the votes.
