= Hermann Götz (politician) =

German politician

Member of the Bundestag; from Hesse
- In office 7 September 1949 – 13 December 1976
- Preceded by: Constituency established
- Succeeded by: Alfred Dregger
- Constituency: State list (1949–1957); Fulda (1957–1976)

Personal details
- Born: 20 May 1914 Duppau, Austria-Hungary
- Died: 21 April 1987 (aged 72) Fulda, West Germany
- Party: Christian Democratic Union

Hermann Götz (20 May 1914 – 21 April 1987) was a German politician of the Christian Democratic Union (CDU) and former member of the German Bundestag.

== Political career ==
Götz was a member of the CDU. In 1970 he was a member of the board of the CDU regional association of Hesse. Götz was a member of the German Bundestag from its first election in 1949 to 1976. Previously elected via the Hessian state list, he has always made it into parliament since 1957 by winning the direct mandate in the Fulda constituency.

== Literature ==
Herbst, Ludolf; Jahn, Bruno (2002). Vierhaus, Rudolf (ed.). Biographisches Handbuch der Mitglieder des Deutschen Bundestages. 1949–2002 [Biographical Handbook of the Members of the German Bundestag. 1949–2002] (in German). München: De Gruyter - De Gruyter Saur. p. 1715. ISBN 978-3-11-184511-1.
