= Tobias Wolf =

German footballer

Personal information
- Date of birth: 6 August 1988 (age 38)
- Place of birth: Fulda, West Germany
- Height: 1.87 m (6 ft 2 in)
- Position: Goalkeeper

Team information
- Current team: SG Barockstadt
- Number: 30

Senior career*
Years	Team	Apps	(Gls)
2006–2007	Borussia Fulda	1	(0)
2007–2010	Hessen Kassel	10	(0)
2010–2012	Kickers Offenbach	4	(0)
2010–2012	Kickers Offenbach II	18	(0)
2012–2018	Borussia Fulda	92	(1)
2018–	SG Barockstadt	39	(0)
- * Club domestic league appearances and goals as of 16 February 2021

Tobias Wolf (born 6 August 1988) is a German footballer who plays as a goalkeeper for SG Barockstadt Fulda-Lehnerz.
