= Stahlhelm-Fraktion =

Right-wing faction in German political parties

Stahlhelm-Fraktion (German, 'Steel Helmet Faction') was the hard-line or right-wing faction of a political party in Germany, most notably the German CDU. The term refers to the hawkish, i.e. pro-military positions often taken by such groups and comes from the Stahlhelm, the steel helmet historically used by German soldiers. It was originally used of pro-military politicians in the Weimar Republic who were members of the Der Stahlhelm, an ex-servicemen's organisation which acted as the paramilitary wing of the German National People's Party. Some prominent members of this informal grouping (the name was coined by its opponents) such as Alfred Dregger had been members of the NSDAP during the war. Members of the CSU – even those ideologically similar to the Stahlhelm Fraktion – were usually not considered part of the group.

== See also ==
- Der Stahlhelm, Bund der Frontsoldaten
- Der Flügel
- German Militarism
- Military history of Germany
- Freikorps
