= Fulda (electoral district) =

Federal electoral district of Germany

173 Fulda
- Electoral district for the Bundestag
- Fulda in 2025
- State: Hesse
- Population: 273,100 (2019)
- Electorate: 208,542 (2021)
- Major settlements: Fulda; Hünfeld; Lauterbach
- Area: 2,130.2 km^{2}

Current electoral district
- Created: 1949
- Party: CDU
- Member: Michael Brand
- Elected: 2005, 2009, 2013, 2017, 2021, 2025

Fulda is an electoral constituency (German: Wahlkreis) represented in the Bundestag. It elects one member via first-past-the-post voting. Under the current constituency numbering system, it is designated as constituency 173. It is located in eastern Hesse, comprising the Fulda district and the southeastern part of the Vogelsbergkreis district.

Fulda was created for the inaugural 1949 federal election. Since 2005, it has been represented by Michael Brand of the Christian Democratic Union (CDU).

== Geography ==
Fulda is located in eastern Hesse. As of the 2021 federal election, it comprises the entirety of the Fulda district, as well as the Vogelsbergkreis district excluding the municipalities of Alsfeld, Antrifttal, Feldatal, Gemünden (Felda), Homberg (Ohm), Kirtorf, Mücke, and Romrod.

== History ==
Fulda was created in 1949. In the 1949 election, it was Hesse constituency 9 in the numbering system. In the 1953 through 1976 elections, it was number 134. From 1980 through 1998, it was number 132. In 2002 and 2005, it was number 176. In the 2009 election, it was number 175. In the 2013 through 2021 elections, it was number 174. From the 2025 election, it has been number 173.

Originally, the constituency comprised the independent city of Fulda and the districts of Landkreis Fulda, Lauterbach, and Schlüchtern. In the 1976 election, it comprised the district of Fulda excluding the municipalities of Burghaun, Eiterfeld, Hünfeld, Nüsttal, and Rasdorf; the municipalities of Bad Soden-Salmünster, Birstein, Brachttal, Schlüchtern, Sinntal, Steinau, Wächtersbach, Züntersbach, and the Gutsbezirk Spessart area from the Main-Kinzig-Kreis district; and the municipalities of Freiensteinau, Grebenhain, Herbstein, Lauterbach, Lautertal, Schlitz, Schotten, Ulrichstein, and Wartenberg from the Vogelsbergkreis district. In the 2002 election, it acquired borders very similar to its current configuration, but including the municipalities of Birstein, Schlüchtern, Sinntal, and Steinau an der Straße from Main-Kinzig-Kreis district, and the municipality of Schwalmtal from Vogelsbergkreis district. It acquired its current borders in the 2013 election.

Election	No.	Name	Borders
1949	9	Fulda	Fulda city; Landkreis Fulda district; Lauterbach district; Schlüchtern district
1953	134	Fulda	Fulda city; Landkreis Fulda district; Lauterbach district; Schlüchtern district
1957	134	Fulda	Fulda city; Landkreis Fulda district; Lauterbach district; Schlüchtern district
1961	134	Fulda	Fulda city; Landkreis Fulda district; Lauterbach district; Schlüchtern district
1965	134	Fulda	Fulda city; Landkreis Fulda district; Lauterbach district; Schlüchtern district
1969	134	Fulda	Fulda city; Landkreis Fulda district; Lauterbach district; Schlüchtern district
1972	134	Fulda	Fulda city; Landkreis Fulda district; Lauterbach district; Schlüchtern district
1976	134	Fulda	Fulda district (excluding Burghaun, Eiterfeld, Hünfeld, Nüsttal, and Rasdorf municipalities); Main-Kinzig-Kreis district (only Bad Soden-Salmünster, Birstein, Brachttal, Schlüchtern, Sinntal, Steinau, Wächtersbach, and Züntersbach municipalities and the Gutsbezirk Spessart area); Vogelsbergkreis district (only Freiensteinau, Grebenhain, Herbstein, Lauterbach, Lautertal, Schlitz, Schotten, Ulrichstein, and Wartenberg municipalities)
1980	131	Fulda	Fulda district (excluding Burghaun, Eiterfeld, Hünfeld, Nüsttal, and Rasdorf municipalities); Main-Kinzig-Kreis district (only Bad Soden-Salmünster, Birstein, Brachttal, Schlüchtern, Sinntal, Steinau, Wächtersbach, and Züntersbach municipalities and the Gutsbezirk Spessart area); Vogelsbergkreis district (only Freiensteinau, Grebenhain, Herbstein, Lauterbach, Lautertal, Schlitz, Schotten, Ulrichstein, and Wartenberg municipalities)
1983	131	Fulda	Fulda district (excluding Burghaun, Eiterfeld, Hünfeld, Nüsttal, and Rasdorf municipalities); Main-Kinzig-Kreis district (only Bad Soden-Salmünster, Birstein, Brachttal, Schlüchtern, Sinntal, Steinau, Wächtersbach, and Züntersbach municipalities and the Gutsbezirk Spessart area); Vogelsbergkreis district (only Freiensteinau, Grebenhain, Herbstein, Lauterbach, Lautertal, Schlitz, Schotten, Ulrichstein, and Wartenberg municipalities)
1987	131	Fulda	Fulda district (excluding Burghaun, Eiterfeld, Hünfeld, Nüsttal, and Rasdorf municipalities); Main-Kinzig-Kreis district (only Bad Soden-Salmünster, Birstein, Brachttal, Schlüchtern, Sinntal, Steinau, Wächtersbach, and Züntersbach municipalities and the Gutsbezirk Spessart area); Vogelsbergkreis district (only Freiensteinau, Grebenhain, Herbstein, Lauterbach, Lautertal, Schlitz, Schotten, Ulrichstein, and Wartenberg municipalities)
1990	131	Fulda	Fulda district (excluding Burghaun, Eiterfeld, Hünfeld, Nüsttal, and Rasdorf municipalities); Main-Kinzig-Kreis district (only Bad Soden-Salmünster, Birstein, Brachttal, Schlüchtern, Sinntal, Steinau, Wächtersbach, and Züntersbach municipalities and the Gutsbezirk Spessart area); Vogelsbergkreis district (only Freiensteinau, Grebenhain, Herbstein, Lauterbach, Lautertal, Schlitz, Schotten, Ulrichstein, and Wartenberg municipalities)
1994	131	Fulda	Fulda district (excluding Burghaun, Eiterfeld, Hünfeld, Nüsttal, and Rasdorf municipalities); Main-Kinzig-Kreis district (only Bad Soden-Salmünster, Birstein, Brachttal, Schlüchtern, Sinntal, Steinau, Wächtersbach, and Züntersbach municipalities and the Gutsbezirk Spessart area); Vogelsbergkreis district (only Freiensteinau, Grebenhain, Herbstein, Lauterbach, Lautertal, Schlitz, Schotten, Ulrichstein, and Wartenberg municipalities)
1998	131	Fulda	Fulda district (excluding Burghaun, Eiterfeld, Hünfeld, Nüsttal, and Rasdorf municipalities); Main-Kinzig-Kreis district (only Bad Soden-Salmünster, Birstein, Brachttal, Schlüchtern, Sinntal, Steinau, Wächtersbach, and Züntersbach municipalities and the Gutsbezirk Spessart area); Vogelsbergkreis district (only Freiensteinau, Grebenhain, Herbstein, Lauterbach, Lautertal, Schlitz, Schotten, Ulrichstein, and Wartenberg municipalities)
2002	176	Fulda	Fulda district; Vogelsbergkreis district (excluding Alsfeld, Antrifttal, Feldatal, Gemünden (Felda), Homberg (Ohm), Kirtorf, Mücke, Romrod, and Schwalmtal municipalities); Main-Kinzig-Kreis district (only Birstein, Schlüchtern, Sinntal, and Steinau an der Straße municipalities)
2005	176	Fulda	Fulda district; Vogelsbergkreis district (excluding Alsfeld, Antrifttal, Feldatal, Gemünden (Felda), Homberg (Ohm), Kirtorf, Mücke, Romrod, and Schwalmtal municipalities); Main-Kinzig-Kreis district (only Birstein, Schlüchtern, Sinntal, and Steinau an der Straße municipalities)
2009	175	Fulda	Fulda district; Vogelsbergkreis district (excluding Alsfeld, Antrifttal, Feldatal, Gemünden (Felda), Homberg (Ohm), Kirtorf, Mücke, Romrod, and Schwalmtal municipalities); Main-Kinzig-Kreis district (only Birstein, Schlüchtern, Sinntal, and Steinau an der Straße municipalities)
2013	174	Fulda	Fulda district; Vogelsbergkreis district (excluding Alsfeld, Antrifttal, Feldatal, Gemünden (Felda), Homberg (Ohm), Kirtorf, Mücke, and Romrod municipalities)
2017	174	Fulda	Fulda district; Vogelsbergkreis district (excluding Alsfeld, Antrifttal, Feldatal, Gemünden (Felda), Homberg (Ohm), Kirtorf, Mücke, and Romrod municipalities)
2021	174	Fulda	Fulda district; Vogelsbergkreis district (excluding Alsfeld, Antrifttal, Feldatal, Gemünden (Felda), Homberg (Ohm), Kirtorf, Mücke, and Romrod municipalities)
2025	173	Fulda	Fulda district; Vogelsbergkreis district (excluding Alsfeld, Antrifttal, Feldatal, Gemünden (Felda), Homberg (Ohm), Kirtorf, Mücke, and Romrod municipalities)

== Members ==
Due to Fulda area being strongly Catholic, the constituency is considered a Christian Democratic Union (CDU) safe seat and has been held continuously by the party since its creation. It was first represented by Anton Sabel from 1949 to 1957, followed by Hermann Götz from 1957 to 1976. Alfred Dregger then served from 1976 to 1998, when he was succeeded by Martin Hohmann. Hohmann was expelled from the CDU group in 2003 for antisemitic comments, and served as an independent for the rest of his term. Michael Brand was elected in 2005, and re-elected in 2009, 2013, 2017, and 2021.

Election	Member	Party	%
1949	Anton Sabel	CDU	43.0
1953	Anton Sabel	CDU	53.4
1957	Hermann Götz	CDU	59.6
1961	Hermann Götz	CDU	54.1
1965	Hermann Götz	CDU	54.9
1969	Hermann Götz	CDU	56.6
1972	Hermann Götz	CDU	55.9
1976	Alfred Dregger	CDU	58.9
1980	Alfred Dregger	CDU	56.0
1983	Alfred Dregger	CDU	61.8
1987	Alfred Dregger	CDU	57.7
1990	Alfred Dregger	CDU	56.7
1994	Alfred Dregger	CDU	55.1
1998	Martin Hohmann (Note: Hohmann was elected for the CDU, but expelled from the party in November 2003.)	CDU	49.5
2002	Martin Hohmann	CDU	54.0
2002	Martin Hohmann	Ind.	54.0
2005	Michael Brand	CDU	39.1
2009	Michael Brand	CDU	49.8
2013	Michael Brand	CDU	58.3
2017	Michael Brand	CDU	45.2
2021	Michael Brand	CDU	38.1
2025	Michael Brand	CDU	43.3

== Election results ==
=== 2025 election ===
Federal election (2025): Fulda
Notes:	Blue background denotes the winner of the electorate vote. Pink background denotes a candidate elected from their party list. Yellow background denotes an electorate win by a list member, or other incumbent. A ✓ or ✗ denotes status of any incumbent, win or lose respectively.						
Party	Candidate	Votes	%	±%	Party votes	%	±%
CDU	✓ Michael Brand	75,039	43.3	▲5.2	65,247	37.6	▲6.5
AfD	Pierre Lamely	39,789	22.9	▲7.8	40,952	23.6	▲10.3
SPD	Christine Fischer	23,675	13.6	▼8.1	22,299	12.8	▼9.6
Greens	Marie-Louise Puls	11,460	6.6	▼2.0	13,195	7.6	▼2.5
Left	Steven Lorenz	7,254	4.2	▲1.3	9,085	5.2	▲2.5
FW	Wilhelm Hartmann	6,101	3.5	▲0.8	3,951	2.3	▲0.3
FDP	Philipp Kratzer	5,969	3.4	▼5.2	8,517	4.9	▼7.8
Tierschutzpartei					1,649	0.9	▼0.3
Volt	Justin Auth	1,901	1.1	New	1,262	0.7	▲0.1
PARTEI	Sabastian Künemund	1,608	0.9	New	789	0.5	▼0.4
BD	Michael Heilmann	700	0.4	New	356	0.2	New
Humanists					115	0.1	0.0
MLPD					22	<0.1	0.0
Informal votes		1,471			1,285		
Total valid votes		173,496			173,682		
Turnout		174,967	84.7	▲6.3			
CDU hold	Majority	35,250	20.4	▲4.1			

=== 2021 election ===
Federal election (2021): Fulda
Notes:	Blue background denotes the winner of the electorate vote. Pink background denotes a candidate elected from their party list. Yellow background denotes an electorate win by a list member, or other incumbent. A ✓ or ✗ denotes status of any incumbent, win or lose respectively.						
Party	Candidate	Votes	%	±%	Party votes	%	±%
CDU	✓ Michael Brand	61,573	38.1	▼7.1	50,312	31.1	▼7.8
SPD	Birgit Kömpel	35,168	21.8	▲1.6	36,343	22.5	▲4.4
AfD	Martin Hohmann	24,508	15.2	▼2.4	21,443	13.3	▼2.6
FDP	Jürgen Lenders	13,894	8.6	▲3.3	20,528	12.7	▲1.9
Greens	Gabriela Zimmermann	13,833	8.6	▲3.0	16,324	10.1	▲3.4
Left	Nuha Sharif-Ali	4,648	2.9	▼1.9	4,447	2.8	▼3.1
FW	Peter Klug	4,442	2.7	▲1.7	3,136	1.9	▲1.2
dieBasis	Petra Herchenröder	2,619	1.6		2,458	1.5	
Tierschutzpartei					2,007	1.2	▲0.4
PARTEI					1,326	0.8	▲0.1
Volt					961	0.6	
Independent	Eva Hemm	520	0.3				
Bündnis C	Peter Schäfer von Reetnitz	460	0.3		468	0.3	
Pirates					442	0.3	0.0
Team Todenhöfer					399	0.2	
NPD					239	0.1	▼0.3
Gesundheitsforschung					231	0.1	
ÖDP					189	0.1	▼0.1
V-Partei3					151	0.1	0.0
Humanists					130	0.1	
Bündnis 21					71	0.0	
LKR					51	0.0	
DKP					28	0.0	0.0
MLPD					20	0.0	0.0
Informal votes		1,895			1,856		
Total valid votes		161,665			161,704		
Turnout		163,560	78.4	▲1.3			
CDU hold	Majority	26,405	16.3	▼8.7			

=== 2017 election ===
Federal election (2017): Fulda
Notes:	Blue background denotes the winner of the electorate vote. Pink background denotes a candidate elected from their party list. Yellow background denotes an electorate win by a list member, or other incumbent. A ✓ or ✗ denotes status of any incumbent, win or lose respectively.						
Party	Candidate	Votes	%	±%	Party votes	%	±%
CDU	✓ Michael Brand	71,946	45.2	▼13.2	61,811	39.0	▼12.2
SPD	Birgit Kömpel	32,150	20.2	▼4.8	28,745	18.1	▼4.0
AfD	Martin Hohmann	27,990	17.6		25,145	15.8	▲10.0
Greens	Walter Michael Rammler	8,874	5.6	▲0.1	10,593	6.7	0.0
FDP	Sibylle von Brunn	8,437	5.3	▲2.9	17,122	10.8	▲5.9
Left	Nick Papak Amoozegar	7,669	4.8	▲0.2	9,266	5.8	▲1.2
Tierschutzpartei					1,318	0.8	
PARTEI					1,189	0.7	▲0.4
FW	Michael Hans Krebühl	1,657	1.0		1,178	0.7	▲0.1
NPD	Martin Kohlhepp	576	0.4	▼1.6	663	0.4	▼1.0
Pirates					427	0.3	▼1.5
ÖDP					346	0.2	
DM					295	0.2	
BGE					277	0.2	
V-Partei³					216	0.1	
MLPD					36	0.0	0.0
DKP					30	0.0	
BüSo					25	0.0	0.0
Informal votes		2,682			3,299		
Total valid votes		159,299			158,682		
Turnout		161,981	77.1	▲3.8			
CDU hold	Majority	30,796	25.0	▼8.3			

=== 2013 election ===
Federal election (2013): Fulda
Notes:	Blue background denotes the winner of the electorate vote. Pink background denotes a candidate elected from their party list. Yellow background denotes an electorate win by a list member, or other incumbent. A ✓ or ✗ denotes status of any incumbent, win or lose respectively.						
Party	Candidate	Votes	%	±%	Party votes	%	±%
CDU	✓ Michael Brand	87,263	58.3	▲7.6	76,778	51.1	▲9.4
SPD	Birgit Kömpel	37,352	25.0	▲1.7	33,218	22.1	▲2.6
Greens	Hildegard Scheu	8,125	5.4	▼1.9	10,058	6.7	▼1.9
Left	Wolfgang Lörcher	6,869	4.6	▼2.1	6,900	4.6	▼3.0
AfD					8,711	5.8	
FDP	Mario Klotzsche	3,605	2.4	▼7.6	7,313	4.9	▼12.8
Pirates	Herbert Rusche	3,390	2.3		2,715	1.8	▲0.1
NPD	Hans-Joachim Bosold	2,992	2.0	▲0.1	2,190	1.5	0.0
FW					1,033	0.7	
PARTEI					578	0.4	
REP					414	0.3	▼0.3
PRO					162	0.1	
SGP					71	0.0	
BüSo					64	0.0	▼0.1
MLPD					25	0.0	0.0
Informal votes		4,429			3,795		
Total valid votes		149,596			150,320		
Turnout		154,025	73.4	▼0.9			
CDU hold	Majority	49,911	33.3	▲7.4			

=== 2009 election ===
Federal election (2009): Fulda
Notes:	Blue background denotes the winner of the electorate vote. Pink background denotes a candidate elected from their party list. Yellow background denotes an electorate win by a list member, or other incumbent. A ✓ or ✗ denotes status of any incumbent, win or lose respectively.						
Party	Candidate	Votes	%	±%	Party votes	%	±%
CDU	✓ Michael Brand	86,084	49.8	▲10.7	70,740	40.8	▼2.7
SPD	Claudia Blum	41,388	23.9	▼5.8	34,783	20.1	▼10.5
FDP	Mario Klotzsche	17,415	10.1	▲7.0	30,594	17.6	▲7.1
Greens	Ernst Sporer	12,556	7.3	▲4.4	14,727	8.5	▲2.4
Left	Wolfgang Lörcher	11,923	6.9	▲4.2	13,377	7.7	▲2.9
Pirates					3,034	1.7	
NPD	Hans-Joachim Bosold	3,591	2.1	▲1.0	2,722	1.6	0.0
Tierschutzpartei					1,599	0.9	▲0.1
REP					1,337	0.8	▼0.6
BüSo					221	0.1	0.0
DVU					186	0.1	
MLPD					58	0.0	0.0
Informal votes		4,081			3,660		
Total valid votes		172,957			173,378		
Turnout		177,038	73.8	▼5.3			
CDU hold	Majority	44,696	25.9	▲16.5			

=== 2005 election ===
Federal election (2005):Fulda
Notes:	Blue background denotes the winner of the electorate vote. Pink background denotes a candidate elected from their party list. Yellow background denotes an electorate win by a list member, or other incumbent. A ✓ or ✗ denotes status of any incumbent, win or lose respectively.						
Party	Candidate	Votes	%	±%	Party votes	%	±%
CDU	Michael Brand	72,048	39.1	▼14.8	78,943	43.5	▼5.7
SPD	Claudia Blum	54,765	29.7	▼5.4	55,453	30.5	▼1.4
Independent	Martin Hohmann	39,545	21.5				
FDP	Mario Klotzsche	5,653	3.1	▼1.8	19,172	10.6	▲2.8
Greens	Bernd Eckart	5,238	2.8	▼1.0	11,041	6.1	▼0.6
Left	Irene Rogatty	4,989	2.7	▲1.8	8,815	4.9	▲3.9
REP					2,524	1.4	▲0.4
NPD	Hans-Joachim Bosold	1,967	1.1	▼0.2	2,778	1.5	▲0.9
Tierschutzpartei					1,503	0.8	▲0.4
GRAUEN					875	0.5	▲0.3
SGP					226	0.1	
BüSo					202	0.1	▲0.1
MLPD					88	0.0	
Informal votes		4,624			7,209		
Total valid votes		184,205			181,620		
Turnout		188,829	79.1	▼2.0			
CDU hold	Majority	17,283	9.4				
