= Michael Brand (politician) =

German politician (born 1973)

Michael Brand MdB
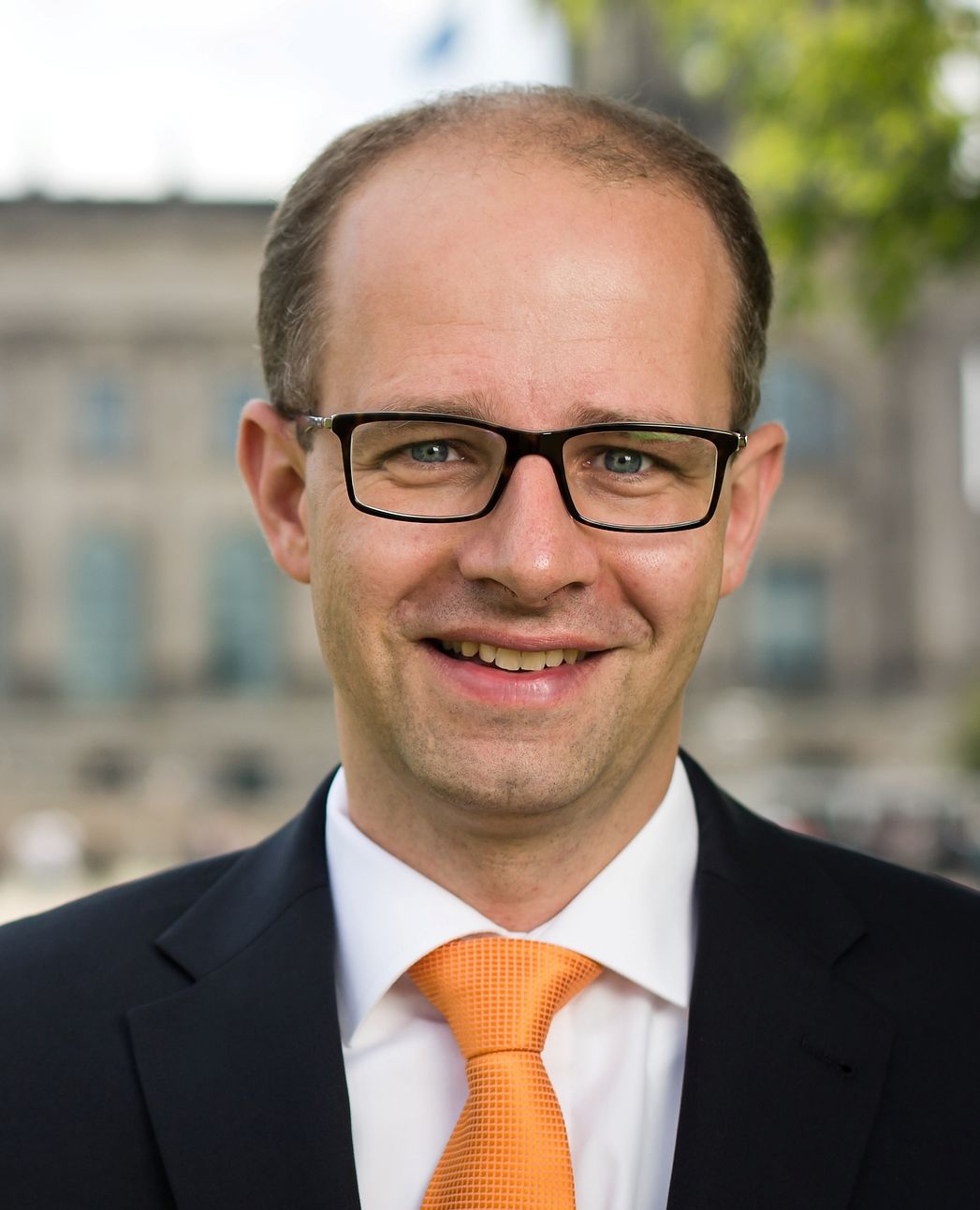
- Brand in 2013

Member of the Bundestag; for Fulda
- Incumbent
- Assumed office 18 October 2005
- Preceded by: Martin Hohmann

Personal details
- Born: Michael Karl Brand; 19 November 1973 (age 52) Fulda, West Germany
- Party: Christian Democratic Union
- Children: 3
- Education: University of Bonn

Michael Karl Brand (born 19 November 1973) is a German politician of the Christian Democratic Union (CDU).

In addition to his work in parliament, Brand has been serving as Parliamentary State Secretary at the Federal Ministry of Education, Family Affairs, Senior Citizens, Women and Youth in the government of Chancellor Friedrich Merz since 2025.

== Political career ==
Brand was born in Fulda in 1973. He is a former election observer at the Organization for Security and Co-operation in Europe (OSCE), Brand has been a directly elected member of the Bundestag since 2005, representing Fulda.

Between 2005 and 2013, Brand was a member of the Committee on the Environment, Nature Conservation and Nuclear Safety, where he served as the CDU/CSU parliamentary group's rapporteur on recycling and waste regulations. From 2009 until 2017, he also served on the Defence Committee and on the Sub-Committee for Civilian Crisis Prevention. Since the 2009 federal elections, Brand has been serving on the Committee on Human Rights and Humanitarian Aid, which he chaired from 2014 until 2017. He is also a member of the Committee on Internal Affairs. In addition, he serves as deputy chairman of the Parliamentary Friendship Group for Relations with Bosnia and Herzegovina and a member of the Parliamentary Friendship Group for Relations with the States of South-Eastern Europe (Albania, Kosovo, Macedonia, Montenegro and Serbia).

In the negotiations to form a coalition government under the leadership of Chancellor Angela Merkel following the 2017 federal elections, Brand was part of the working group on foreign policy, led by Ursula von der Leyen, Gerd Müller and Sigmar Gabriel. Since 2020, Brand has been serving as co-chair of the Inter-Parliamentary Alliance on China (IPAC). In 2023, he co-founded the Cross-Party Parliamentary Group on the Situation of the Uyghurs.

In the negotiations to form a Grand Coalition under the leadership of Friedrich Merz's Christian Democrats (CDU together with the Bavarian CSU) and the Social Democratic Party (SPD) following the 2025 German elections, Brand was again part of the CDU/CSU delegation in the working group on foreign affairs, defense, development cooperation and human rights, this time led by Johann Wadephul, Florian Hahn and Svenja Schulze.

== Other activities ==
=== Government agencies ===
- Federal Agency for Civic Education (BpB), Member of the Board of Trustees (since 2009)

=== Non-profit organizations ===
- Evangelical Church in Germany (EKD), Member of the Committee on Social Responsibility (since 2015)
- He is a member of the Inter-Parliamentary Alliance on China (IPAC)

== Political positions ==
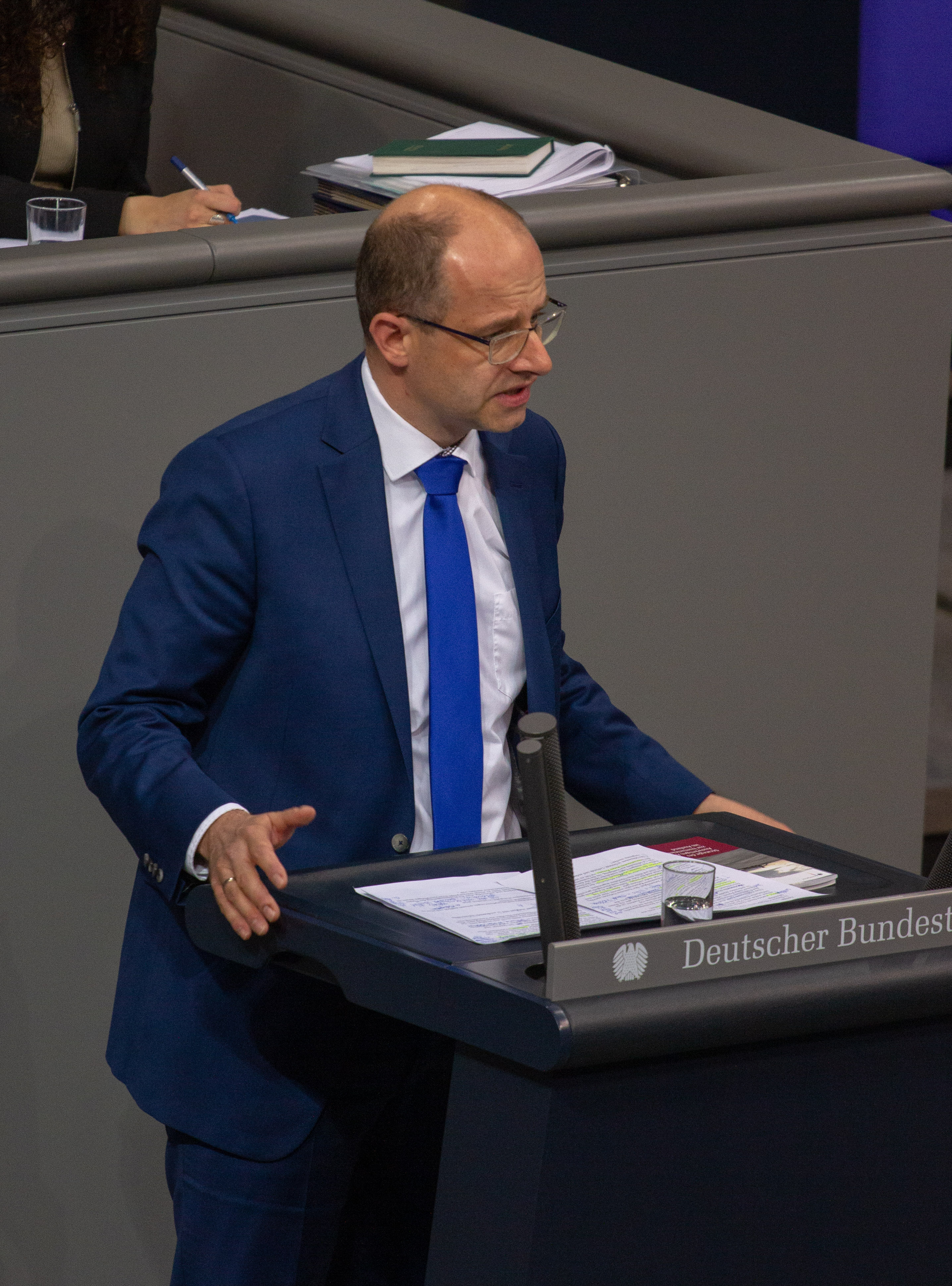
Brand in 2019

In April 2015, Brand vigorously criticized German Foreign Minister Frank-Walter Steinmeier for refusing to use the word "genocide" to describe the mass killing of Armenians by the Ottoman Empire, arguing that "the German foreign minister is expected on a national and international level to recognize and name a genocide; [...] especially because of the Holocaust a genocide must not be by-passed or withheld due to cowardice."

In 2015, a majority of the Bundestag voted in favor of banning assisted suicides performed by associations, on the basis of a proposal put forward by Brand and fellow parliamentarian Kerstin Griese of the Social Democratic Party (SPD). The proposed bill submitted by Brand and Griese had called for "striking a balance" between punishing those who provide suicide assistance and complete deregulation of the process. The parliamentarians voted in favor of one of the proposals irrespective of their parties' policy on the matter. In 2020, the ban was overturned by the Federal Constitutional Court.

In June 2017, Brand voted against Germany's introduction of same-sex marriage.

In September 2020, Brand was one of 15 members of his parliamentary group who joined Norbert Röttgen in writing an open letter to Minister of the Interior Horst Seehofer which called on Germany and other EU counties to take in 5000 immigrants who were left without shelter after fires gutted the overcrowded Mória Reception and Identification Centre on the Greek island of Lesbos.
