= Josh Harris =

Josh or Joshua Harris may refer to the following people:

== Sports ==
=== American football ===
- Josh Harris (businessman) (born 1964), American investor and sports team owner
- Josh Harris (long snapper) (born 1989), American football long snapper
- Josh Harris (quarterback) (born 1982), American football quarterback
- Josh Harris (running back) (born 1991), American football running back

=== Other sports ===
- Josh Harris (businessman) (born 1964), American investor and sports team owner
- Josh Harris (runner) (born 1990), Australian marathon runner
- Jack Harris (footballer, born 1891) (born Joshua Harris, 1891–1966), Scottish footballer

== Others ==
- Josh Harris (businessman) (born 1964), American investor and sports team owner
- Josh Harris (entrepreneur) (born c. 1960), founder of pseudo.com
- Joshua Harris (author) (born 1974), American author and former pastor
- Joshua Harris (actor) (born 1978), American actor and producer
