= Alfred Dregger =

German politician (1920-2002)

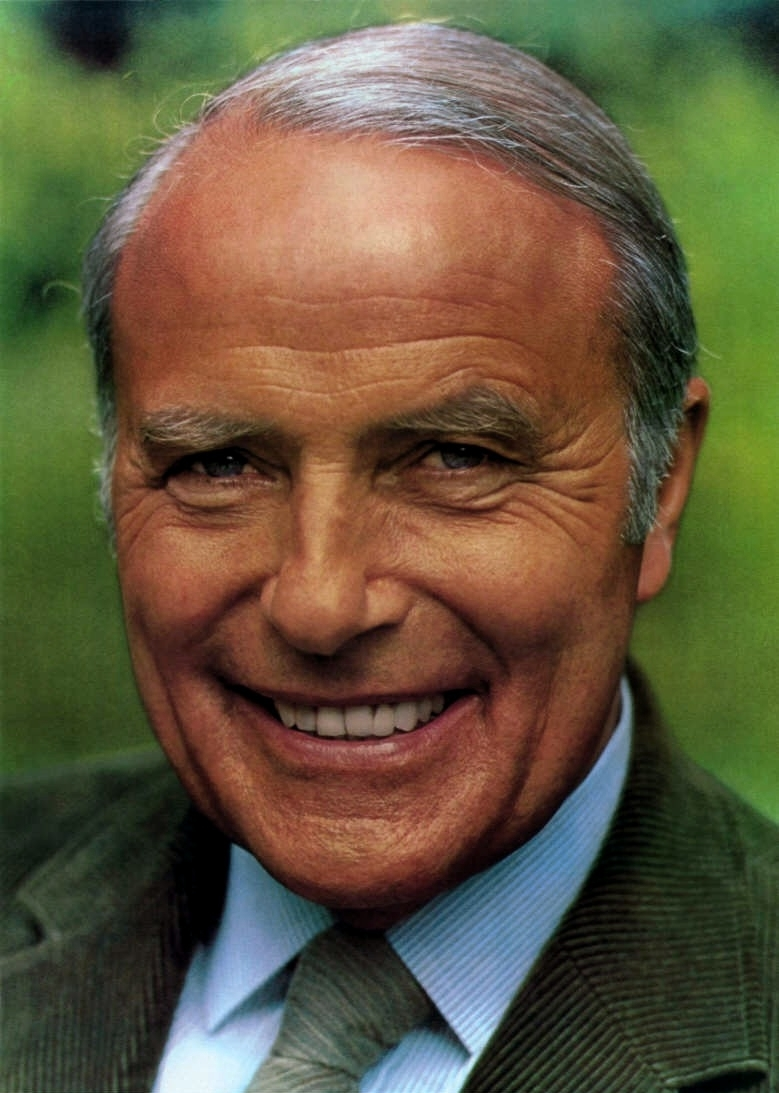
- Dregger in 1980

Leader of the CDU/CSU group in the Bundestag (Note: group known as "CDU/CSU/DSU" from 3 October 1990 to 20 December 1990.)
- In office 4 October 1982 – 25 November 1991
- Chief Whip: Wolfgang Schäuble; Rudolf Seiters; Friedrich Bohl
- First Deputy: Theo Waigel; Wolfgang Bötsch
- Preceded by: Helmut Kohl
- Succeeded by: Wolfgang Schäuble

Member of the Bundestag; from Hesse
- In office 13 December 1972 – 26 October 1998
- Preceded by: Multi-member district
- Succeeded by: Martin Hohmann
- Constituency: State list (1972–1976); Fulda (1976–1998)

Member of the Landtag of Hesse; for Wahlkreis 14
- In office 1 December 1962 – 5 December 1972
- Preceded by: Cuno Raabe
- Succeeded by: Winfried Rippert

Personal details
- Born: 10 December 1920 Münster, Germany
- Died: 29 June 2002 (aged 81) Fulda, Germany
- Party: Christian Democratic Union (1947–2002)
- Other political affiliations: Nazi Party (1940–1945)
- Children: 3
- Education: University of Tübingen; University of Marburg
- Occupation: Politician; Businessman; Lawyer

Alfred Dregger (10 December 1920 – 29 June 2002) was a German politician and a leader of the Christian Democratic Union (CDU) and a former Member of the Nazi Party (NSDAP).

== Early life ==
Dregger was born in Münster. After graduating from a school in Werl, he entered the German Wehrmacht in 1939. He was wounded four times and served until the end of the war, when he commanded a battalion on the Eastern Front at the rank of Captain. In 1946, he began studying law and government at the universities of Marburg and Tübingen, earning his doctorate in 1950.

== Political career ==
Dregger served from 1956 to 1970 as Oberbürgermeister or mayor of Fulda; when first elected, he was the youngest mayor in West Germany. He also served from 1962 to 1972 as a member of the Landtag of Hesse. He was for a time leader of the CDU in that body, and, in 1967, became state party chairman, an office which he held until 1982. In 1969 he was also elected as a member of the national board of the party. From 1972 1998 he was a representative in the German Bundestag; from 1982 to 1991 he was Chairman of the CDU/CSU group there.

Dregger was known as a staunch conservative and was a prominent member of the so-called Stahlhelm-Fraktion, a National-Conservative wing of the CDU.

In the 1970s he was an outspoken proponent of outlawing the German Communist Party. He was responsible for the slogan "Freiheit statt Sozialismus" (Freedom instead of Socialism) with which the CDU had great success in the 1976 elections. In his eulogy, German Chancellor Friedrich Merz said of him, "Few have so clearly and categorically opposed the Left for decades". He called for Germany to "come out of Hitler's shadow".

He resisted criticism of the Wehrmacht, strongly opposing a travelling exhibition called Die Verbrechen der Wehrmacht 1941 - 1944 (The Crimes of the Wehrmacht, 1941–1944) and writing to United States Senators that if they discouraged Ronald Reagan from his presidential visit to the Bitburg military cemetery, he would "consider this to be an insult to my brother and my comrades who were killed in action." He saw himself as a defender of Germany and the last representative of the war generation in the Bundestag.

== Personal life ==
Alfred Dregger was married and had two sons; his elder son was killed in an accident in 1972.

== Sources ==
- Michael Schwab. Alfred Dregger für Fulda und Deutschland: Stationen eines charismatischen Politikers. Fulda informiert: Dokumentationen zur Stadtgeschichte 26. Petersberg: Imhof, 2008. ISBN 978-3-86568-291-8. (in German)
