= Gießen (electoral district) =

Federal electoral district of Germany

172 Gießen
- Electoral district for the Bundestag
- Gießen in 2025
- State: Hesse
- Population: 293,600 (2019)
- Electorate: 217,514 (2021)
- Major settlements: Giessen; Pohlheim; Alsfeld
- Area: 1,343.3 km^{2}

Current electoral district
- Created: 1949
- Party: CDU
- Member: Frederik Bouffier
- Elected: 2025

Gießen is an electoral constituency (German: Wahlkreis) represented in the Bundestag. It elects one member via first-past-the-post voting. Under the current constituency numbering system, it is designated as constituency 172. It is located in central Hesse, comprising the Gießen district and the northwestern part of the Vogelsbergkreis district.

Gießen was created for the inaugural 1949 federal election. From 2021 to 2025, it was represented by Felix Döring of the Social Democratic Party (SPD). Since 2025 it has been represented by Frederik Bouffier of the CDU.

== Geography ==
Gießen is located in central Hesse. As of the 2021 federal election, it comprises the entirety of the Gießen district excluding the municipalities of Biebertal and Wettenberg, as well as the municipalities of Alsfeld, Antrifttal, Feldatal, Gemünden (Felda), Homberg (Ohm), Kirtorf, Mücke, and Romrod from the Vogelsbergkreis district.

== History ==
Gießen was created in 1949. In the 1949 election, it was Hesse constituency 8 in the numbering system. In the 1953 through 1976 elections, it was number 133. From 1980 through 1998, it was number 131. In 2002 and 2005, it was number 175. In the 2009 election, it was number 174. In the 2013 through 2021 elections, it was number 173. From the 2025 election, it has been number 172.

Originally, the constituency comprised the independent city of Gießen and the districts of Landkreis Gießen and Alsfeld. In the 1980 through 1998 elections, it comprised the entirety of Gießen district as well as the municipalities of Alsfeld, Antrifttal, Feldatal, Gemünden (Felda), Grebenau, Homberg (Ohm), Kirtorf, Mücke, Romrod, Schwalmtal from the Vogelbergskreis district. In the 2002 election, it acquired borders very similar to its current configuration, but including the municipalities of Grebenau, Schotten, and Schwalmtal from Vogelsbergkreis district. It acquired its current borders in the 2013 election.

Election	No.	Name	Borders
1949	8	Gießen	Gießen city; Landkreis Gießen district; Alsfeld district
1953	133	Gießen	Gießen city; Landkreis Gießen district; Alsfeld district
1957	133	Gießen	Gießen city; Landkreis Gießen district; Alsfeld district
1961	133	Gießen	Gießen city; Landkreis Gießen district; Alsfeld district
1965	133	Gießen	Gießen city; Landkreis Gießen district; Alsfeld district
1969	133	Gießen	Gießen city; Landkreis Gießen district; Alsfeld district
1972	133	Gießen	Gießen city; Landkreis Gießen district; Alsfeld district
1976	133	Gießen	Gießen city; Landkreis Gießen district; Alsfeld district
1980	130	Gießen	Gießen district; Vogelsbergkreis district (only Alsfeld, Antrifttal, Feldatal, Gemünden (Felda), Grebenau, Homberg (Ohm), Kirtorf, Mücke, Romrod, and Schwalmtal municipality)
1983	130	Gießen	Gießen district; Vogelsbergkreis district (only Alsfeld, Antrifttal, Feldatal, Gemünden (Felda), Grebenau, Homberg (Ohm), Kirtorf, Mücke, Romrod, and Schwalmtal municipality)
1987	130	Gießen	Gießen district; Vogelsbergkreis district (only Alsfeld, Antrifttal, Feldatal, Gemünden (Felda), Grebenau, Homberg (Ohm), Kirtorf, Mücke, Romrod, and Schwalmtal municipality)
1990	130	Gießen	Gießen district; Vogelsbergkreis district (only Alsfeld, Antrifttal, Feldatal, Gemünden (Felda), Grebenau, Homberg (Ohm), Kirtorf, Mücke, Romrod, and Schwalmtal municipality)
1994	130	Gießen	Gießen district; Vogelsbergkreis district (only Alsfeld, Antrifttal, Feldatal, Gemünden (Felda), Grebenau, Homberg (Ohm), Kirtorf, Mücke, Romrod, and Schwalmtal municipality)
1998	130	Gießen	Gießen district; Vogelsbergkreis district (only Alsfeld, Antrifttal, Feldatal, Gemünden (Felda), Grebenau, Homberg (Ohm), Kirtorf, Mücke, Romrod, and Schwalmtal municipality)
2002	175	Gießen	Gießen district (excluding Biebertal and Wettenberg municipalities); Vogelsbergkreis district (only Alsfeld, Antrifttal, Feldatal, Gemünden (Felda), Grebenau, Homberg (Ohm), Kirtorf, Mücke, Romrod, Schotten, and Schwalmtal municipalities)
2005	175	Gießen	Gießen district (excluding Biebertal and Wettenberg municipalities); Vogelsbergkreis district (only Alsfeld, Antrifttal, Feldatal, Gemünden (Felda), Grebenau, Homberg (Ohm), Kirtorf, Mücke, Romrod, Schotten, and Schwalmtal municipalities)
2009	174	Gießen	Gießen district (excluding Biebertal and Wettenberg municipalities); Vogelsbergkreis district (only Alsfeld, Antrifttal, Feldatal, Gemünden (Felda), Grebenau, Homberg (Ohm), Kirtorf, Mücke, Romrod, Schotten, and Schwalmtal municipalities)
2013	173	Gießen	Gießen district (excluding Biebertal and Wettenberg municipalities); Vogelsbergkreis district (only Alsfeld, Antrifttal, Feldatal, Gemünden (Felda), Homberg (Ohm), Kirtorf, Mücke, and Romrod municipalities)
2017	173	Gießen	Gießen district (excluding Biebertal and Wettenberg municipalities); Vogelsbergkreis district (only Alsfeld, Antrifttal, Feldatal, Gemünden (Felda), Homberg (Ohm), Kirtorf, Mücke, and Romrod municipalities)
2021	173	Gießen	Gießen district (excluding Biebertal and Wettenberg municipalities); Vogelsbergkreis district (only Alsfeld, Antrifttal, Feldatal, Gemünden (Felda), Homberg (Ohm), Kirtorf, Mücke, and Romrod municipalities)
2025	172	Gießen	Gießen district (excluding Biebertal and Wettenberg municipalities); Vogelsbergkreis district (only Alsfeld, Antrifttal, Feldatal, Gemünden (Felda), Homberg (Ohm), Kirtorf, Mücke, and Romrod municipalities)

== Members ==
The constituency was first represented by Ludwig Schneider of the Free Democratic Party (FDP) from 1949 to 1957. Hans Merten of the Social Democratic Party (SPD) was elected in 1957 and served until 1969. He was succeeded by fellow SPD member Erwin Horn. Adolf Roth of the Christian Democratic Union (CDU) was elected in 1983, but former member Horn regained the constituency in 1987 and served a further three terms. He was succeeded by fellow SPD member Rüdiger Veit in 1998, who served until 2009. Helge Braun of the CDU was elected in 2009, and re-elected in 2013 and 2017. Felix Döring regained the constituency for the SPD in 2021.

Election	Member	Party	%
1949	Ludwig Schneider	FDP	39.5
1953	Ludwig Schneider	FDP	34.1
1957	Hans Merten	SPD	38.3
1961	Hans Merten	SPD	42.4
1965	Hans Merten	SPD	47.3
1969	Erwin Horn	SPD	49.8
1972	Erwin Horn	SPD	53.3
1976	Erwin Horn	SPD	47.4
1980	Erwin Horn	SPD	50.3
1983	Adolf Roth	CDU	47.5
1987	Erwin Horn	SPD	43.3
1990	Erwin Horn	SPD	41.6
1994	Erwin Horn	SPD	42.3
1998	Rüdiger Veit	SPD	46.4
2002	Rüdiger Veit	SPD	45.3
2005	Rüdiger Veit	SPD	43.3
2009	Helge Braun	CDU	36.7
2013	Helge Braun	CDU	44.4
2017	Helge Braun	CDU	35.1
2021	Felix Döring	SPD	30.4
2025	Frederik Bouffier	CDU	30.4

== Election results ==
=== 2025 election ===
Federal election (2025): Gießen
Notes:	Blue background denotes the winner of the electorate vote. Pink background denotes a candidate elected from their party list. Yellow background denotes an electorate win by a list member, or other incumbent. A ✓ or ✗ denotes status of any incumbent, win or lose respectively.						
Party	Candidate	Votes	%	±%	Party votes	%	±%
CDU	Frederik Bouffier	53,851	30.4	▲0.8	47,077	26.6	▲3.9
SPD	✗ Felix Döring	49,203	27.8	▼2.6	33,232	18.7	▼8.8
AfD	Robin Jünger	33,549	19.0	▲9.9	33,917	19.1	▲9.8
Greens	Michel Zörb	15,277	8.6	▼4.7	21,925	12.4	▼4.0
Left	Desiree Becker	12,442	7.0	▲3.1	17,359	9.8	▲4.8
BSW					7,889	4.5	New
FW	Björn Feuerbach	5,121	2.9	0.0	3,043	1.7	▼0.6
FDP	Dennis Pucher	4,906	2.8	▼4.8	7,410	4.2	▼6.5
Tierschutzpartei					2,199	1.2	▼0.2
Volt	Monika Pranjic	2,593	1.5	New	1,547	0.9	▲0.3
PARTEI					1,079	0.6	▼0.5
BD					284	0.2	New
Humanists					210	0.1	0.0
MLPD					75	<0.1	0.0
Informal votes		1,749			1,445		
Total valid votes		176,942			177,246		
Turnout		178,691	83.1	▲8.6			
CDU gain from SPD	Majority	4,648	2.6	N/A			

=== 2021 election ===
Federal election (2021): Gießen
Notes:	Blue background denotes the winner of the electorate vote. Pink background denotes a candidate elected from their party list. Yellow background denotes an electorate win by a list member, or other incumbent. A ✓ or ✗ denotes status of any incumbent, win or lose respectively.						
Party	Candidate	Votes	%	±%	Party votes	%	±%
SPD	Felix Döring	48,514	30.4	▲2.2	44,046	27.6	▲3.7
CDU	✗ Helge Braun	47,283	29.6	▼5.5	36,201	22.7	▼7.5
Greens	Behzad Borhani	21,249	13.3	▲5.0	26,109	16.3	▲6.7
AfD	Uwe Schulz	14,496	9.1	▼2.5	14,836	9.3	▼3.1
FDP	Dennis Pucher	12,109	7.6	▼0.1	17,106	10.7	▲0.4
Left	Ali Al-Dailami	6,339	4.0	▼2.3	8,028	5.0	▼3.4
FW	Diego Semmler	4,595	2.9	▲0.9	3,697	2.3	▲1.0
Tierschutzpartei					2,301	1.4	▲0.5
PARTEI	Darwin Walter	3,003	1.9		1,818	1.1	▼0.1
dieBasis	Stephan Krüdener	1,954	1.2		1,892	1.2	
Volt					898	0.6	
Team Todenhöfer					632	0.4	
Pirates					555	0.3	▼0.1
Bündnis C					251	0.2	
ÖDP					251	0.2	▼0.1
NPD					235	0.1	▼0.3
Gesundheitsforschung					216	0.1	
Humanists					211	0.1	
V-Partei3					177	0.1	▼0.1
DKP	Henning Mächerle	233	0.1	0.0	117	0.1	0.0
Bündnis 21					50	0.0	
LKR					41	0.0	
MLPD					34	0.0	0.0
Informal votes		2,144			2,217		
Total valid votes		159,775			159,702		
Turnout		161,919	74.4	▼2.1			
SPD gain from CDU	Majority	1,231	0.8				

=== 2017 election ===
Federal election (2017): Gießen
Notes:	Blue background denotes the winner of the electorate vote. Pink background denotes a candidate elected from their party list. Yellow background denotes an electorate win by a list member, or other incumbent. A ✓ or ✗ denotes status of any incumbent, win or lose respectively.						
Party	Candidate	Votes	%	±%	Party votes	%	±%
CDU	✓ Helge Braun	57,610	35.1	▼9.3	49,518	30.1	▼8.5
SPD	Matthias Körner	46,216	28.2	▼7.3	39,252	23.9	▼5.8
AfD	Uwe Schulz	18,918	11.5		20,358	12.4	▲7.5
Greens	Eva Goldbach	13,619	8.3	▲1.0	15,898	9.7	0.0
FDP	Hermann Otto Solms	12,641	7.7	▲4.7	16,926	10.3	▲5.4
Left	Ali Abass Al-Dailami	10,346	6.3	▲1.2	13,798	8.4	▲1.9
FW	Diego Semmler	3,190	1.9		2,170	1.3	0.0
PARTEI					1,967	1.2	▲0.7
Tierschutzpartei					1,572	1.0	
NPD	Thassilo Hantusch	603	0.4	▼1.3	751	0.5	▼0.8
Pirates					654	0.4	▼1.7
ÖDP					384	0.2	
Independent	Peter Klis	376	0.2				
BGE					271	0.2	
V-Partei³					268	0.2	
DM					254	0.2	
MLPD	Wanja Lange	405	0.2		109	0.1	0.0
DKP	Henning Mächerle	234	0.1		119	0.1	
BüSo					44	0.0	0.0
Informal votes		2,463			2,308		
Total valid votes		164,158			164,313		
Turnout		166,621	76.5	▲3.7			
CDU hold	Majority	11,394	6.9	▼2.0			

=== 2013 election ===
Federal election (2013): Gießen
Notes:	Blue background denotes the winner of the electorate vote. Pink background denotes a candidate elected from their party list. Yellow background denotes an electorate win by a list member, or other incumbent. A ✓ or ✗ denotes status of any incumbent, win or lose respectively.						
Party	Candidate	Votes	%	±%	Party votes	%	±%
CDU	✓ Helge Braun	67,587	44.4	▲7.7	59,062	38.7	▲7.6
SPD	Rüdiger Veit	54,028	35.5	▲1.2	45,299	29.7	▲2.4
Greens	Tom Koenigs	11,186	7.3	▼1.5	14,759	9.7	▼2.1
AfD					7,444	4.9	
Left	Ali Abass Al-Dailami	7,802	5.1	▼1.8	9,928	6.5	▼2.5
FDP	Hermann Otto Solms	4,543	3.0	▼8.0	7,553	4.9	▼10.8
Pirates	Sascha Endlicher	3,949	2.6		3,268	2.1	▼0.3
FW					1,982	1.3	
NPD	Volker Sachs	2,483	1.6	▲0.2	1,977	1.3	▲0.2
PARTEI					759	0.5	
Independent	Peter Klis	724	0.5				
REP					273	0.2	▼0.2
PRO					183	0.1	
BüSo					93	0.1	▼0.1
SGP					84	0.1	
MLPD					59	0.0	0.0
Informal votes		4,350			3,929		
Total valid votes		152,302			152,723		
Turnout		156,652	72.8	▲0.1			
CDU hold	Majority	13,559	8.9	▲6.4			

=== 2009 election ===
Federal election (2009): Gießen
Notes:	Blue background denotes the winner of the electorate vote. Pink background denotes a candidate elected from their party list. Yellow background denotes an electorate win by a list member, or other incumbent. A ✓ or ✗ denotes status of any incumbent, win or lose respectively.						
Party	Candidate	Votes	%	±%	Party votes	%	±%
CDU	Helge Braun	59,441	36.7	▼1.1	50,276	31.0	▼1.0
SPD	✗ Rüdiger Veit	55,331	34.2	▼9.1	44,222	27.3	▼9.1
FDP	Hermann Otto Solms	17,928	11.1	▲3.9	25,687	15.8	▲3.5
Greens	Tom Koenigs	14,140	8.7	▲3.5	18,853	11.6	▲1.6
Left	Jonas Ahlgrimm	11,399	7.0	▲2.3	14,605	9.0	▲3.2
Pirates					3,962	2.4	
NPD	Volker Sachs	2,328	1.4	▼0.2	1,853	1.1	▼0.2
Tierschutzpartei					1,528	0.9	▲0.2
Independent	Peter Klis	1,253	0.8				
REP					701	0.4	▼0.4
BüSo					193	0.1	0.0
DVU					158	0.1	
MLPD					46	0.0	0.0
Informal votes		3,848			3,584		
Total valid votes		161,820			162,084		
Turnout		165,668	72.5	▼4.8			
CDU gain from SPD	Majority	4,110	2.5				

=== 2005 election ===
Federal election (2005):Gießen
Notes:	Blue background denotes the winner of the electorate vote. Pink background denotes a candidate elected from their party list. Yellow background denotes an electorate win by a list member, or other incumbent. A ✓ or ✗ denotes status of any incumbent, win or lose respectively.						
Party	Candidate	Votes	%	±%	Party votes	%	±%
SPD	✓ Rüdiger Veit	73,793	43.3	▼2.0	62,080	3634	▼4.3
CDU	Helge Braun	64,468	37.8	▼1.2	54,529	32.0	▼4.5
FDP	Hermann Otto Solms	12,205	7.2	▼1.4	21,076	12.4	▲3.3
Greens	Christian Otto	8,976	5.3	▼0.2	17,023	10.0	▲0.4
Left	Aris Christidis	8,081	4.7	▲3.1	9,887	5.8	▲4.3
NPD	Thomas Hantusch	2,870	1.7		2,269	1.3	▲0.9
REP					1,357	0.8	0.0
Tierschutzpartei					1,327	0.8	▲0.3
GRAUEN					565	0.3	▲0.2
SGP					171	0.1	
BüSo					128	0.1	0.0
MLPD					65	0.0	
Informal votes		4,174			4,090		
Total valid votes		170,393			170,477		
Turnout		174,567	77.3	▼2.2			
SPD hold	Majority	9,325	5.5				
