= Rüdiger Veit =

German politician (1949–2020)

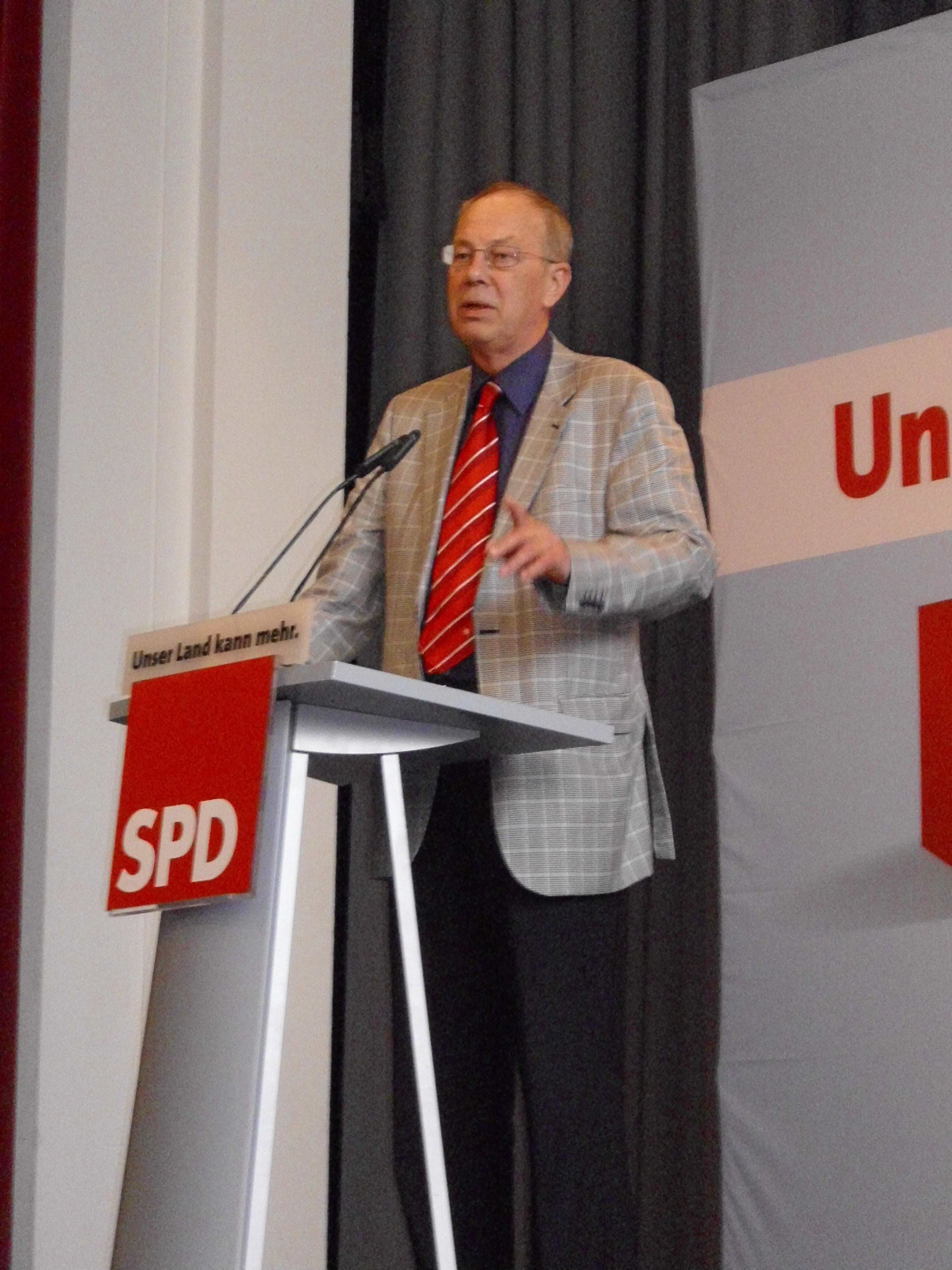
- Veit in 2009

Member of the Bundestag; from Hesse
- In office 26 October 1998 – 24 October 2017
- Preceded by: Erwin Horn
- Succeeded by: Multi-member district
- Constituency: Gießen (1998–2009); State list (2009–2017)

Personal details
- Born: 3 May 1949 Berlin, Germany
- Died: 29 September 2020 (aged 71) Giessen, Germany
- Party: Social Democratic
- Children: 1
- Education: Heidelberg University; University of Giessen
- Occupation: Political, lawyer

Rüdiger Veit (3 May 1949 – 29 September 2020) was a German lawyer and politician who is affiliated with the Social Democratic Party of Germany (SPD).

== Early life and education ==
After graduating from high school in 1967, Veit studied law at the University of Heidelberg and at the Justus Liebig University of Giessen, which he completed in 1972 with the first state law examination. After completing his legal clerkship, he also passed the second state law examination in 1975 and subsequently worked as a lawyer until 1985.

== Political career ==
Veit joined the SPD in 1969. He had been a member of the Giessen SPD sub-district executive committee since 1970 and chairman of the Middle Hesse SPD regional executive committee since 2004. He was chairman of the Giessen sub-district from 1988 to 2004, a member of the state executive committee of the Hessian SPD from 1993 to 1995 and a member of the Hessen-South SPD district executive committee from 1990 to 2007.

From 1977 to 1979 he was a district representative in the Giessen district of the city of Lahn, and from 1979 to 1985 he was a member of the district council of the Giessen district. Veit was First District Deputy from 1985 to 1986 and District Administrator of the district of Giessen from 1986 to 1998.

From 1998 he was a member of the German Bundestag. Here, from October 1998 to October 2003, he was deputy spokesman for the SPD parliamentary group's working group on the interior. From January 2003, Veit was spokesman for the parliamentary group working on migration and integration, and from November 2005 was again deputy spokesman for domestic policy.

In 1998, 2002 and 2005, he entered the Bundestag as a directly elected member of parliament for the constituency of Giessen. In the 2005 Bundestag election, he received 43.3% of the first-place votes. In 2009, Helge Braun (CDU) became a directly elected member of parliament in Giessen. Veit entered the Bundestag via the state list. He was a member of the Interior Committee in all election periods.

For personal reasons, the 68-year-old at the time did not run again for the 2017 Bundestag election.

== Personal life ==
Veit was married and had a daughter.

Veit died on 29 September 2020, after a serious illness.

== Awards ==
- 2020 Willy Brandt Medal
