= Erwin Horn =

German politician (1929–2006)

Member of the Bundestag
- In office 20 October 1969 – 26 October 1998
- Constituency: Gießen (1969–1983, 1987–1998); Hesse state list (1983–1987)

Deputy Chairman of the Bundestag Defence Committee
- In office 1980–1983

Personal details
- Born: 2 May 1929 Annerod, Hesse, Germany
- Died: 13 May 2006 (aged 77)
- Party: Social Democratic Party
- Occupation: Teacher, politician

Erwin Horn (2 May 1929 – 13 May 2006) was a German teacher and politician of the Social Democratic Party (SPD). He was a member of the Bundestag from 1969 to 1998, representing the Gießen constituency in Hesse by direct mandate for most of that period. He was deputy chairman of the Bundestag's Defence Committee from 1980 to 1983.

== Early life and education ==
Horn was born in Annerod, a village near Gießen that is now part of Fernwald. He was a Protestant. After attending a Volksschule and an Aufbauschule, he passed his Abitur in 1948. From 1949 to 1955 he studied history, German, English, philosophy and politics, and took the state examination for teachers in 1955.

== Teaching career ==
Horn worked as a Studienrat from 1955 to 1962. From 1962 to 1966 he was Fachleiter (subject supervisor) for social studies at the teacher training seminar (Studienseminar) in Gießen. From 1966 to 1969 he was headmaster (Oberstudiendirektor) of the Gymnasium in Nidda.

== Political career ==
=== Local politics ===
Horn chaired the SPD sub-district (Unterbezirk) of Gießen from 1962 to 1988. He was a member of the district council (Kreistag) from 1960 to 1976.

=== Member of the Bundestag ===
Horn was elected to the Bundestag in the 1969 federal election. He won the Gießen constituency in each election from 1969 to 1994 except 1983, when he entered parliament through the SPD's Hesse state list. He did not stand in the 1998 election and left the Bundestag at the end of the 13th legislative term.

He was deputy chairman of the Defence Committee from 1980 to 1983 and the SPD's Obmann (lead member) on the committee from 1983 to 1990. From 1977 to 1988 he was a member of the executive board of the SPD parliamentary group. During the 13th legislative term he was a deputy member of the Foreign Affairs Committee and, from 1997, a deputy member of the Defence Committee.

In the Bundestag debate of 21–22 November 1983 on the deployment of American intermediate-range missiles under the NATO Double-Track Decision, Horn spoke for the SPD. He said the decision had become a source of dispute within the alliance and a burden on domestic politics in the countries where the missiles were to be stationed. He said the SPD had originally regarded the decision as a means of bringing the superpowers to negotiations on disarmament, and that the deployment would not change the global strategic balance. The Bundestag approved the deployment with the votes of the CDU/CSU and FDP.

In 1990, during the debate on the equipment of the former East German National People's Army, Horn proposed that the Bundeswehr take over all of its MiG-29 fighter aircraft and that Germany withdraw from the Jäger 90 project. He said that scrapping usable weapons while placing new arms contracts could not be justified given the level of public debt.

=== International assemblies ===
Horn was a member of the North Atlantic Assembly. He chaired its Military Committee from 1981 to 1985 and its socialist group from 1985 to 1988. He was part of the German delegation to the assembly's spring session in Paris in May 1990. He was a substitute member of the German delegation to the Parliamentary Assembly of the Council of Europe from 1981 to 1984 and from 1995 to 1999, and a deputy member of the Assembly of the Western European Union.

== Conviction ==
In 1990 a Schöffengericht (lay-judge court) in Cologne fined Horn 24,000 DM for false unsworn testimony and attempted obstruction of prosecution. The court found that he had made false statements in a traffic case against a master mason from Bornheim. Horn had been a passenger in the man's car in April 1988 when it damaged another vehicle while leaving a parking space in central Cologne and drove away. The driver was convicted of leaving the scene of an accident.

== Death ==
Horn died on 13 May 2006.

== Honours ==
- 1983: Cross of Merit, 1st Class (Verdienstkreuz 1. Klasse) of the Order of Merit of the Federal Republic of Germany
- 1988: Grand Cross of Merit (Großes Verdienstkreuz) of the Order of Merit of the Federal Republic of Germany
