= Otto Piltz =

German painter

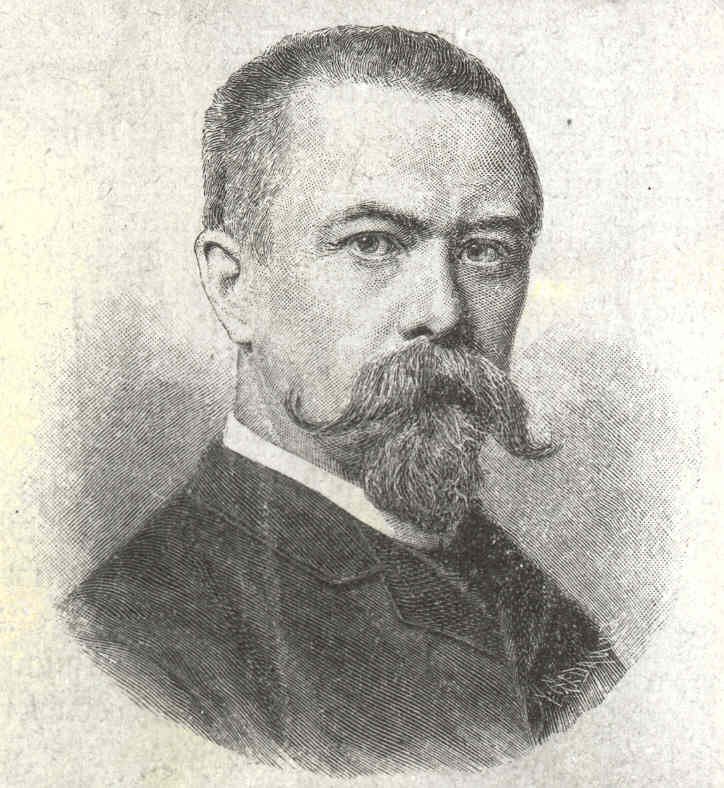
Otto Piltz (1887); engraving by Hermann Gedan (?-?)

Otto Piltz (28 June 1846 – 20 August 1910) was a German genre painter and illustrator for Die Gartenlaube.

== Life ==
Born in Allstedt, he was the son of a soap-maker. After an apprenticeship as a decorative painter in Halle, he studied at the Weimar Saxon-Grand Ducal Art School from 1866 to 1871. His teachers were Paul Thumann, Bernhard Plockhorst and Charles Verlat. During the 1870s, he worked at the artists' colonies in Kleinsassen and Willingshausen. He lived in Weimar until 1886, Berlin until 1889, then in Pasing until his death. In 1882, he was appointed a Professor by Grand Duke Charles Alexander. He became a member of the Munich Secession in 1893.

He painted both urban and rural scenes but was especially successful at painting children. He also travelled throughout Thuringia, Hesse, Bavaria and the Tyrol, documenting the local costumes that were already beginning to disappear. He sometimes accompanied a young friend, Franz Marc, on painting excursions to Dachau.

He died of pneumonia, following a heart attack.

== Selected paintings ==
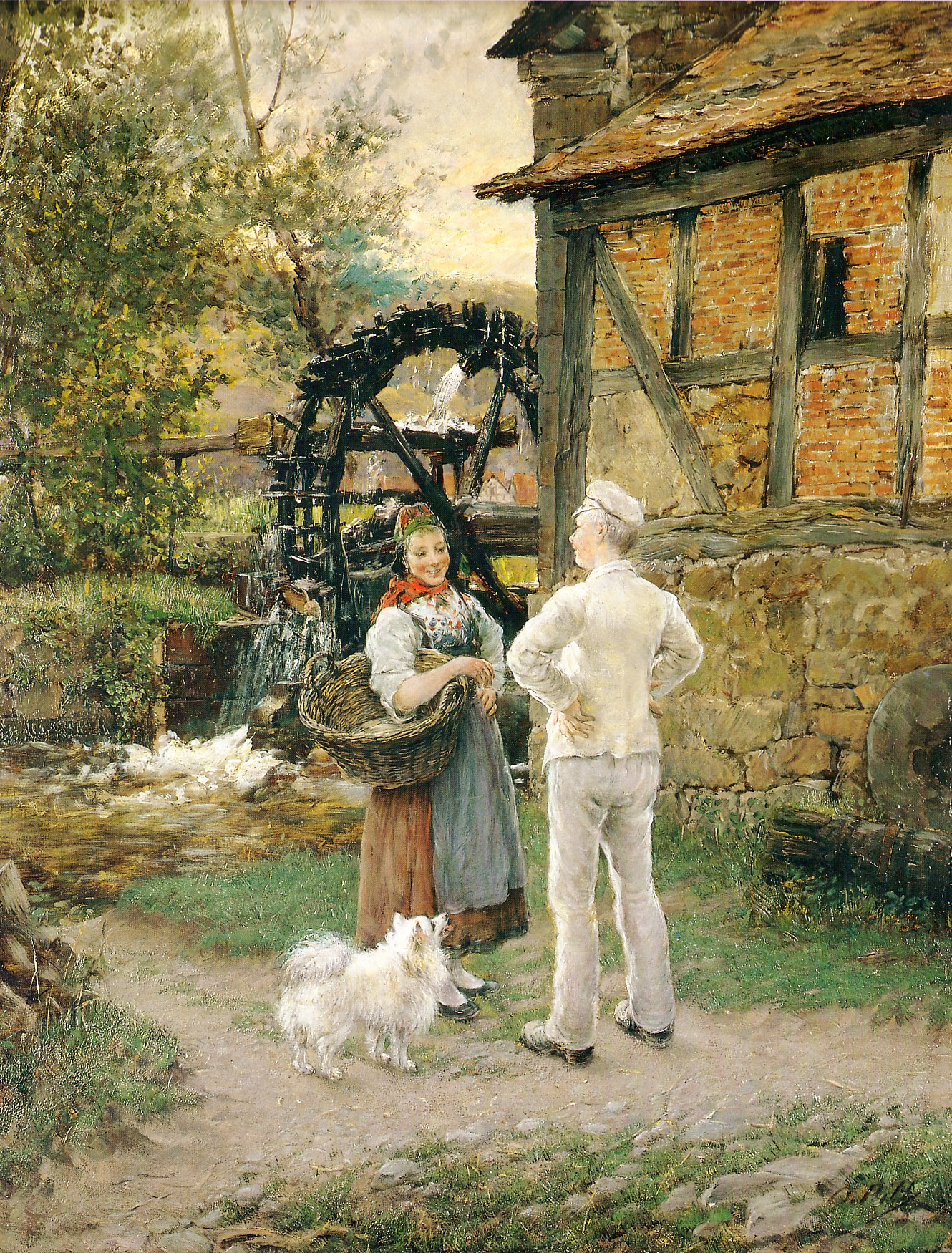
By the Chapel Mill

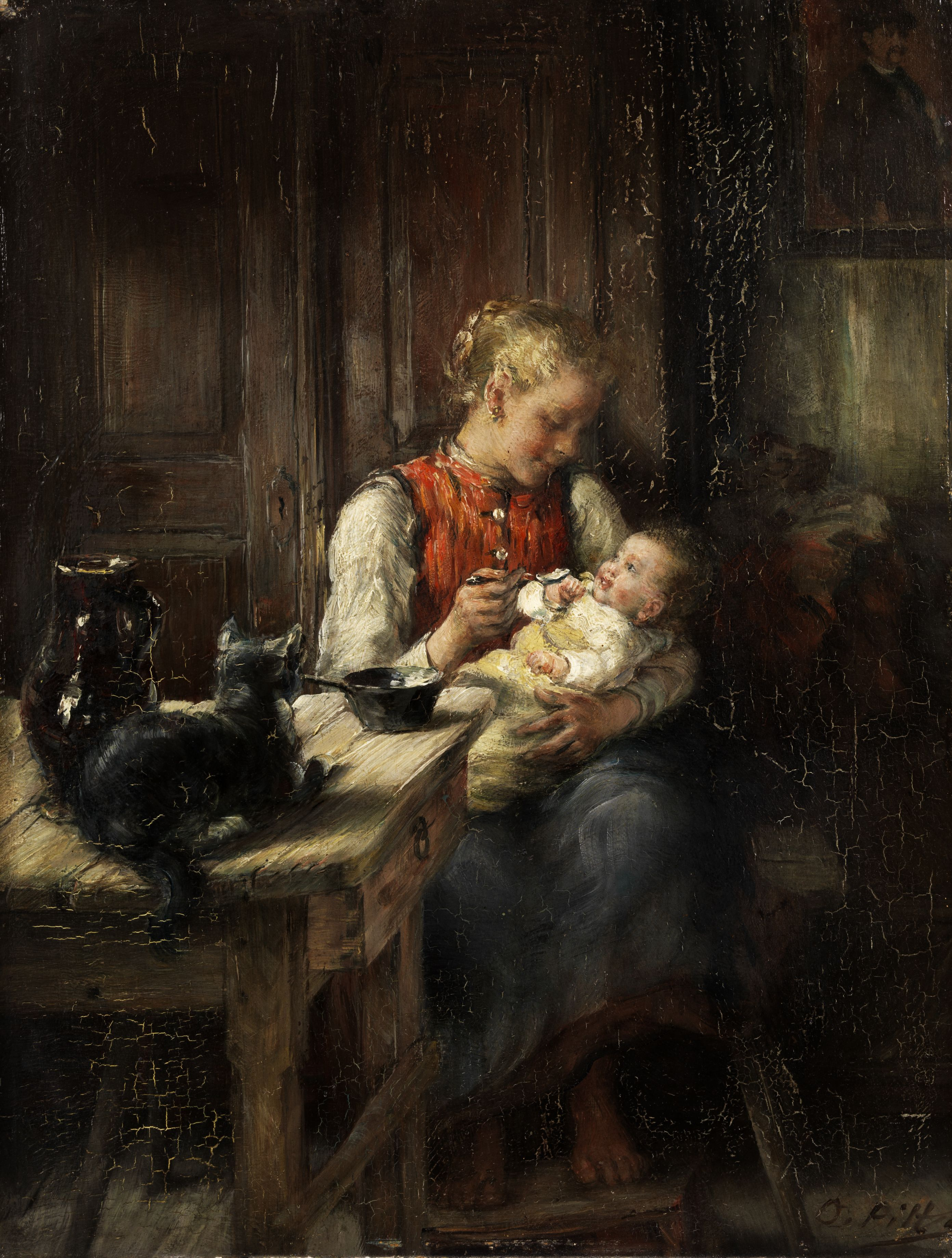
Sisterly Love

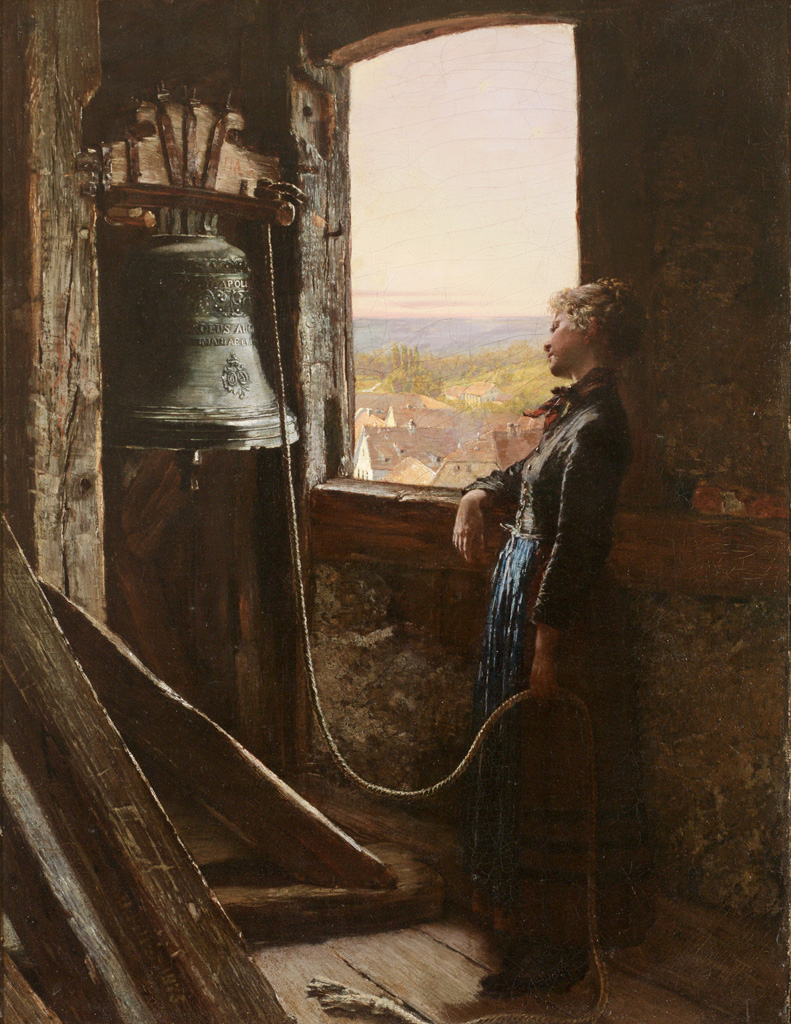
The Maiden Bellringer

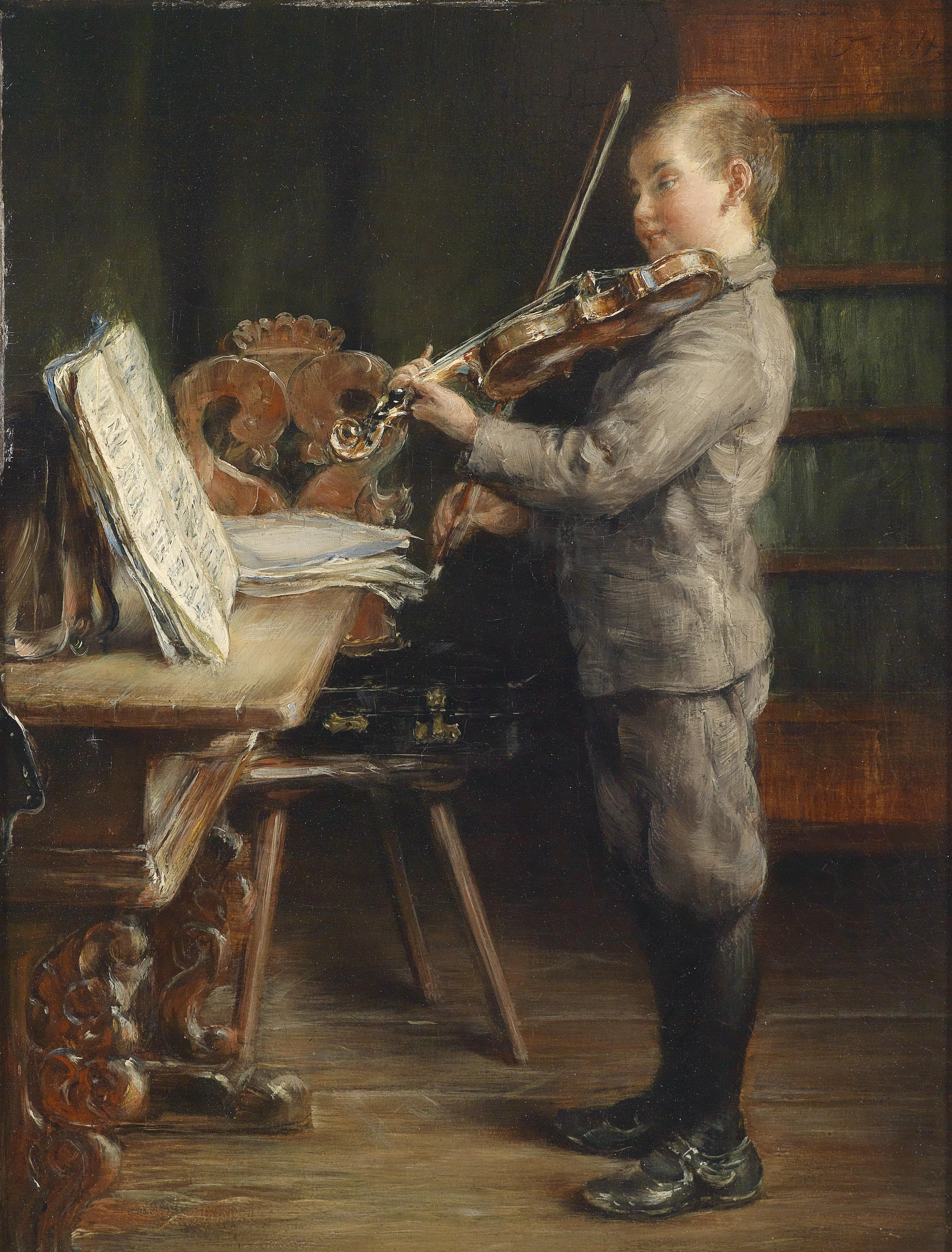
Boy Playing the Violin

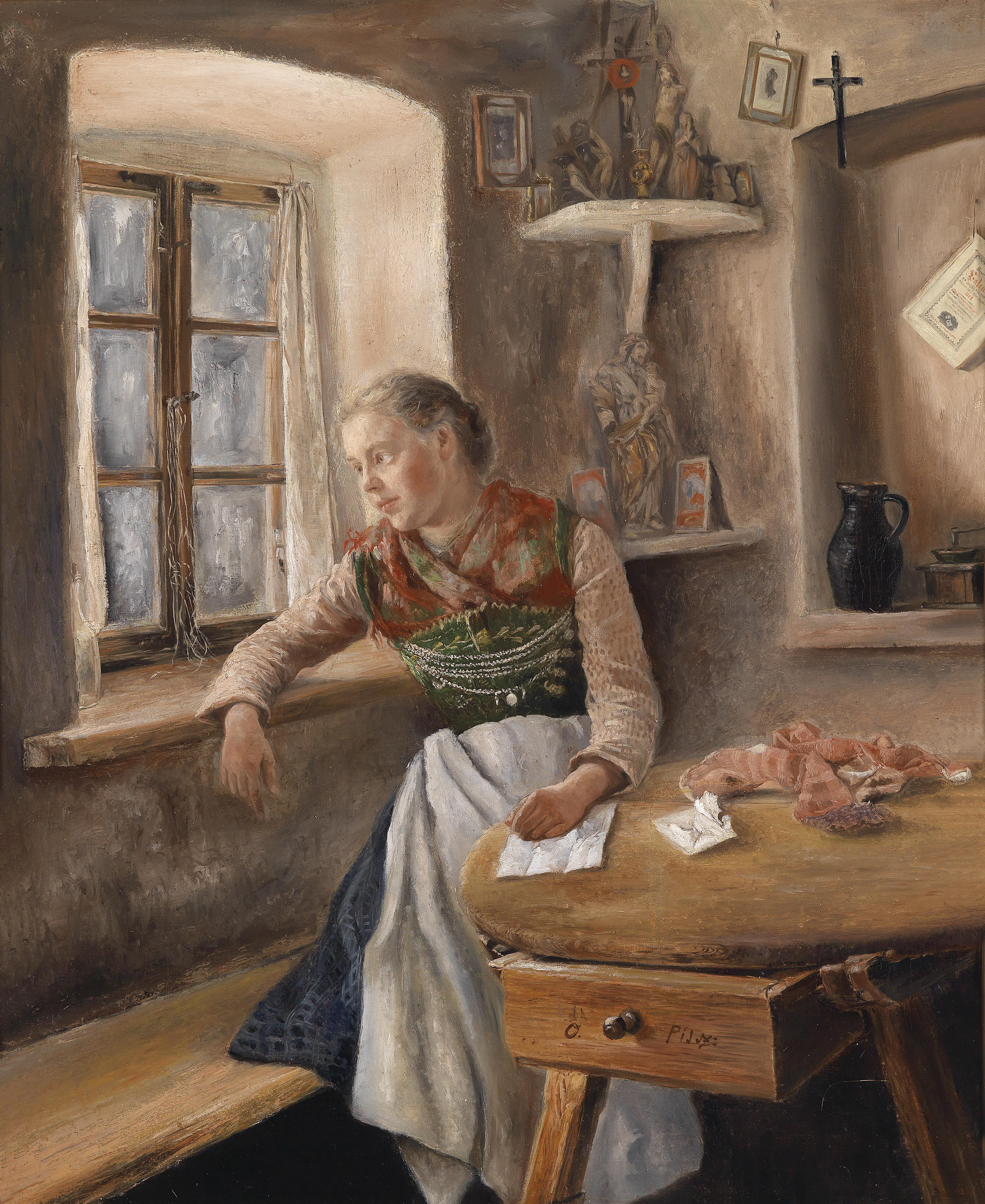
Young Woman at the Window

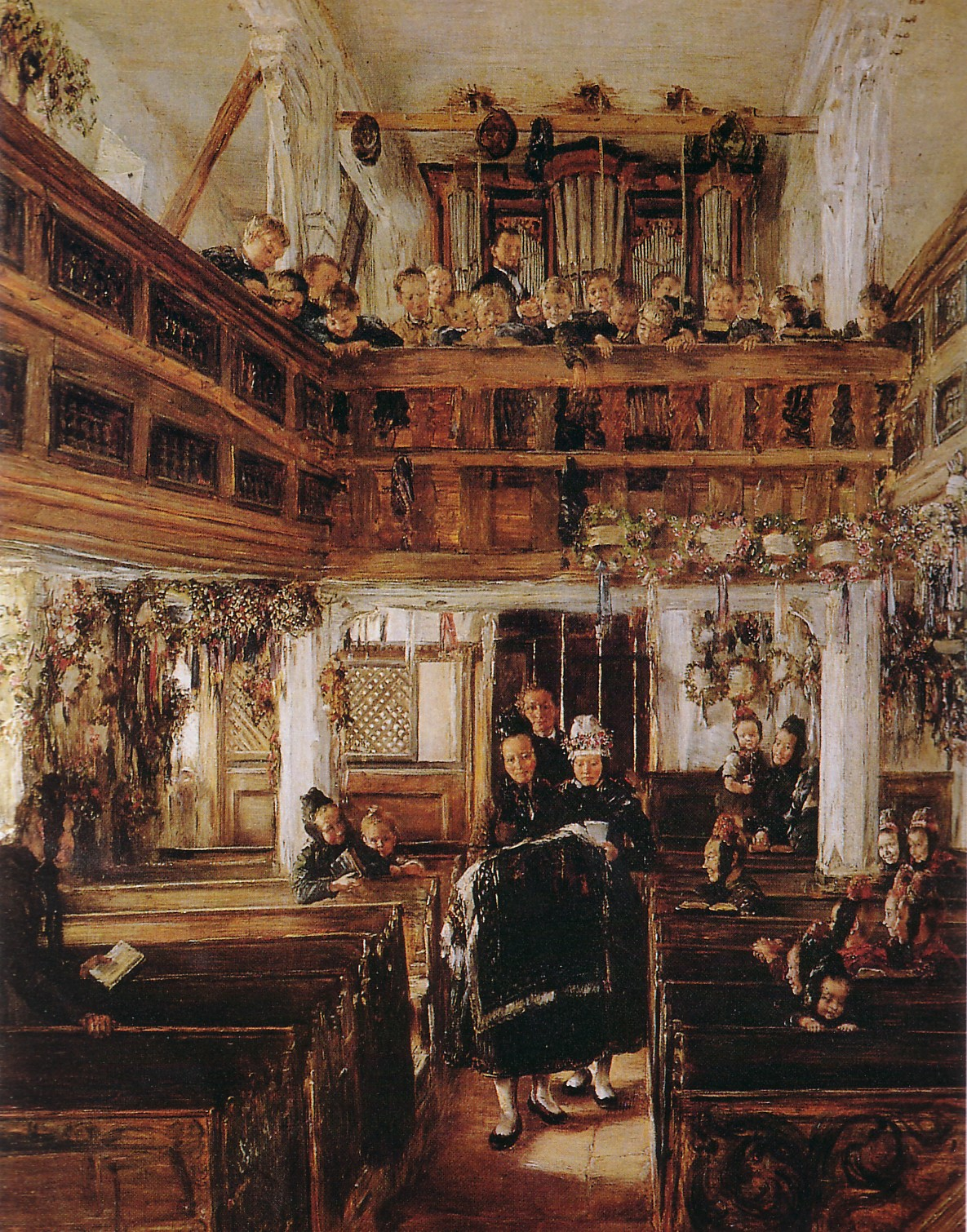
Infant Baptism
in the Church Chapel

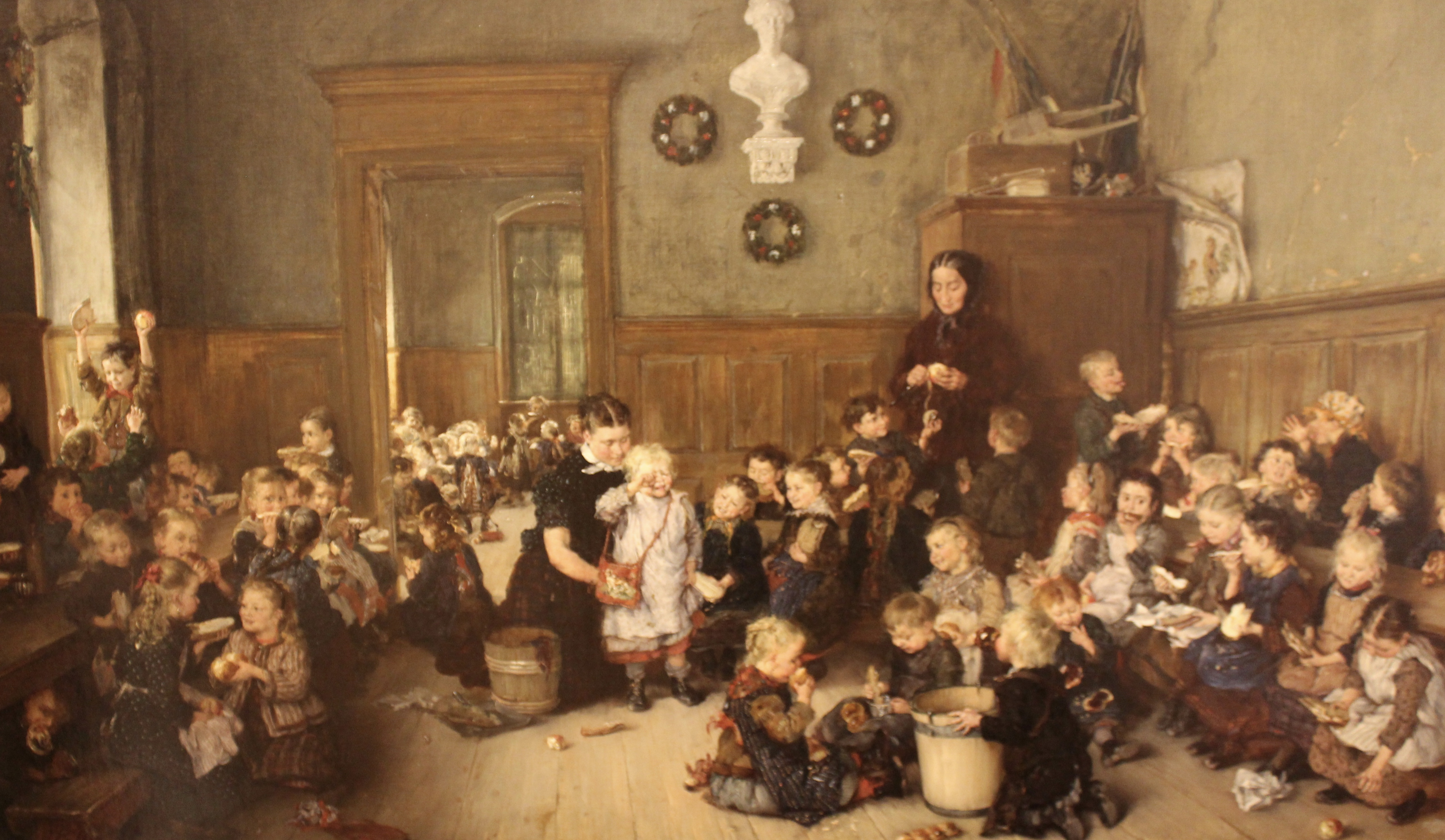
Kindergarten
