= Frederik Bouffier =

German politician (born 1990)

Frederik Bouffier MdB

Member of the Bundestag; for Gießen
- Incumbent
- Assumed office 25 March 2025
- Preceded by: Felix Döring

Member of the Landtag of Hesse; for Gießen I
- In office 18 January 2024 – 31 March 2025
- Preceded by: Nina Heidt-Sommer
- Succeeded by: Michelle Kraft

Personal details
- Born: 7 October 1990 (age 35) Giessen, Germany
- Party: Christian Democratic Union (since 2008)
- Parent: Volker Bouffier (father)
- Education: University of Giessen; University of Nottingham

Frederik Bouffier (born 7 October 1990) is a German politician serving as a member of the Bundestag since 2025. From 2024 to 2025, he was a member of the Landtag of Hesse.
