= Neustadt, Hesse =

Neustadt
- Town
- Coat of arms

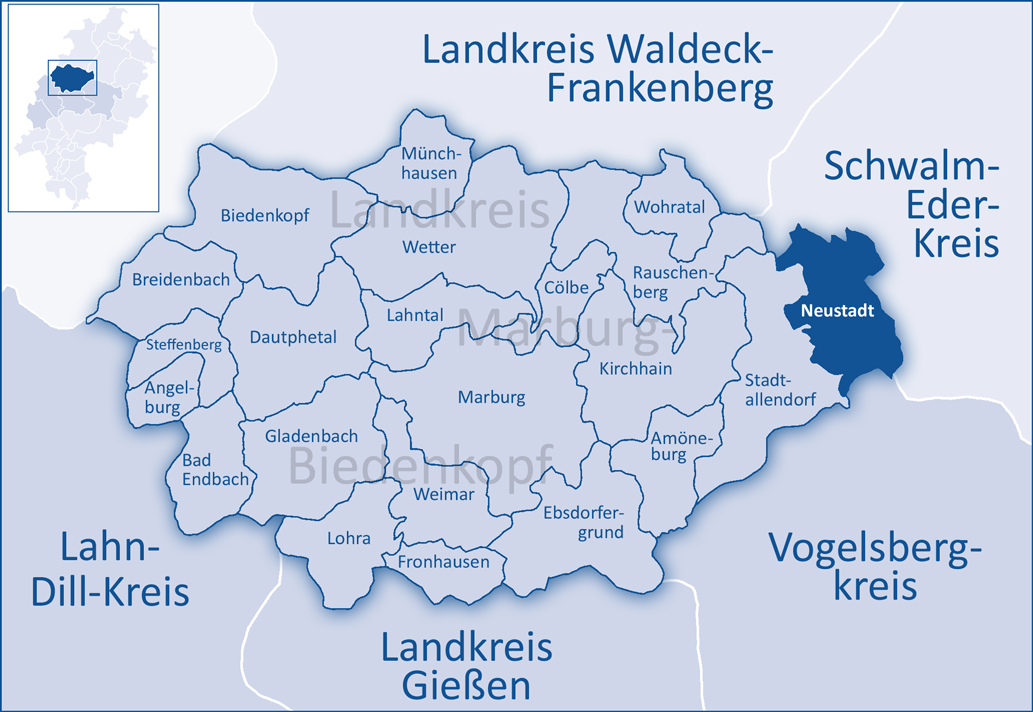
- Location of Neustadt within Marburg-Biedenkopf district
- Interactive map of Neustadt
- Location within Germany Location within Hesse
- Coordinates: 50°51′N 9°7′E
- Country: Germany
- State: Hesse
- Admin. region: Gießen
- District: Marburg-Biedenkopf

Government
  - Mayor (2018–24): Thomas Groll (CDU)

Area
  - Total: 56.86 km^{2} (21.95 sq mi)
- Elevation: 240–300 m (790–980 ft)

Population (2025-12-31)
  - Total: 9,289
  - Density: 163.4/km^{2} (423.1/sq mi)
- Time zone: UTC+01:00 (CET)
  - Summer (DST): UTC+02:00 (CEST)
- Postal codes: 35279
- Dialling codes: 06692
- Vehicle registration: MR
- Website: www.stadt-neustadt-hessen.de

Neustadt (German pronunciation: [ˈnɔʏʃtat]) is a town in the Marburg-Biedenkopf district in Hesse, Germany.

== Geography ==
=== Location ===
Neustadt lies in the Middle Hessian Bergland ("Highland") at the eastern end of Marburg-Biedenkopf district.

=== Neighbouring municipalities ===
Neustadt borders in the north on the municipality of Gilserberg, in the east on the town of Schwalmstadt and the municipality of Willingshausen (all three in the Schwalm-Eder-Kreis), in the southeast on the municipality of Antrifttal, in the south on the town of Kirtorf (both in the Vogelsbergkreis), and in the west on the town of Stadtallendorf (Marburg-Biedenkopf).

=== Town divisions ===
Neustadt, as well as the core municipality known as Neustadt, has centres known as Mengsberg, Momberg and Speckswinkel.

== Politics ==
=== Town council ===
After municipal elections on 26 March 2006, the town council is arranged thus:

Parties and Voter groups		Share in %	Seats
CDU	Christian Democratic Union	59.9	15
SPD	Social Democratic Party of Germany	27.6	7
REP	Republicans	6.1	1
FWG	Free Voter municipality	6.4	2
total		100	25

=== Coat of arms ===
Neustadt's coat of arms, like many throughout western Germany, depicts Saint Martin of Tours cutting off a piece of his cloak for a poor man and the Wheel of Mainz.

=== Town partnerships ===
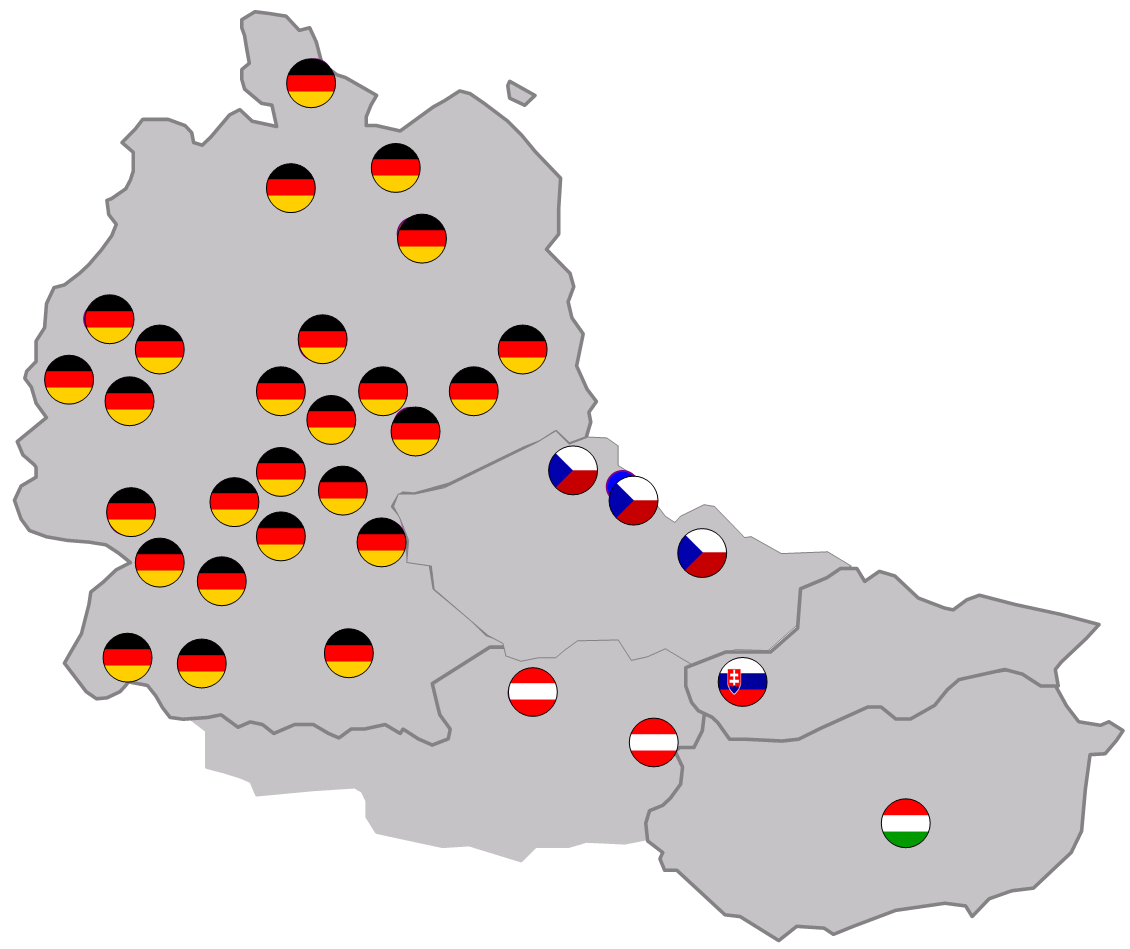
"Neustadt in Europe" Labour municipality, 2006

Neustadt is a member of the international town friendship called the Arbeitsgemeinschaft Neustadt in Europa, which as of 2025 had 36 member towns – all named Neustadt – in seven Central European countries.

== Culture and sightseeing ==
=== Buildings ===
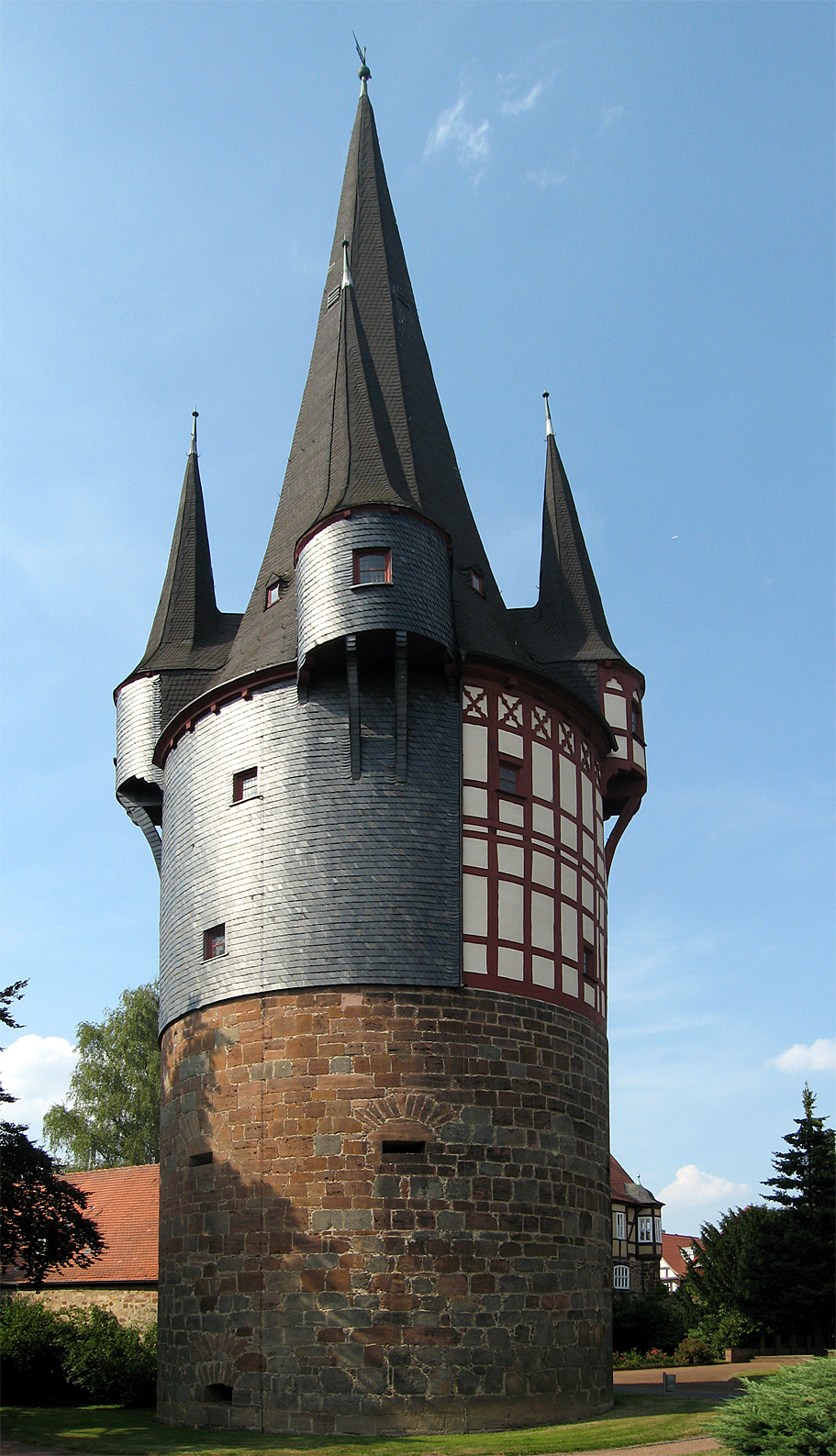
Junker-Hansen-Turm, Neustadt´s landmark

- Junker-Hansen-Turm (tower), a remainder of a castle built in 1480 by the fortification building master Hans Jakob von Ettlingen; has the world's biggest half-timbered rotunda.
