= Michelle Kraft =

German politician (born 1989)

Member of the Landtag of Hesse
- Incumbent
- Assumed office 1 April 2025
- Preceded by: Frederik Bouffier
- Constituency: Gießen I

Personal details
- Born: 11 April 1989 (age 37)
- Party: Christian Democratic Union

Michelle Kraft (born 11 April 1989) is a German politician, serving as a member of the Landtag of Hesse since 2025. She has served as speaker of the city council of Lollar since 2026.
