= Bernhard Plockhorst =

German painter

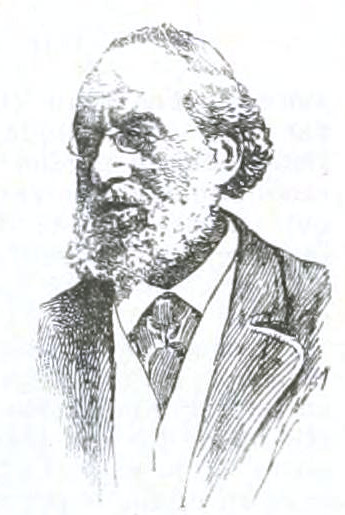
- Born: Bernhard Plockhorst; 2 March 1825; Braunschweig, Germany
- Died: 18 May 1907 (aged 82); Berlin, Germany
- Known for: Painting, graphic artist

Bernhard Plockhorst (March 2, 1825 – May 18, 1907) was a German painter and graphic artist. In Germany, Plockhorst is mainly known to experts today, whereas his pictures are still very popular in the United States and their reproductions can be found in many American homes and churches.

== Life ==
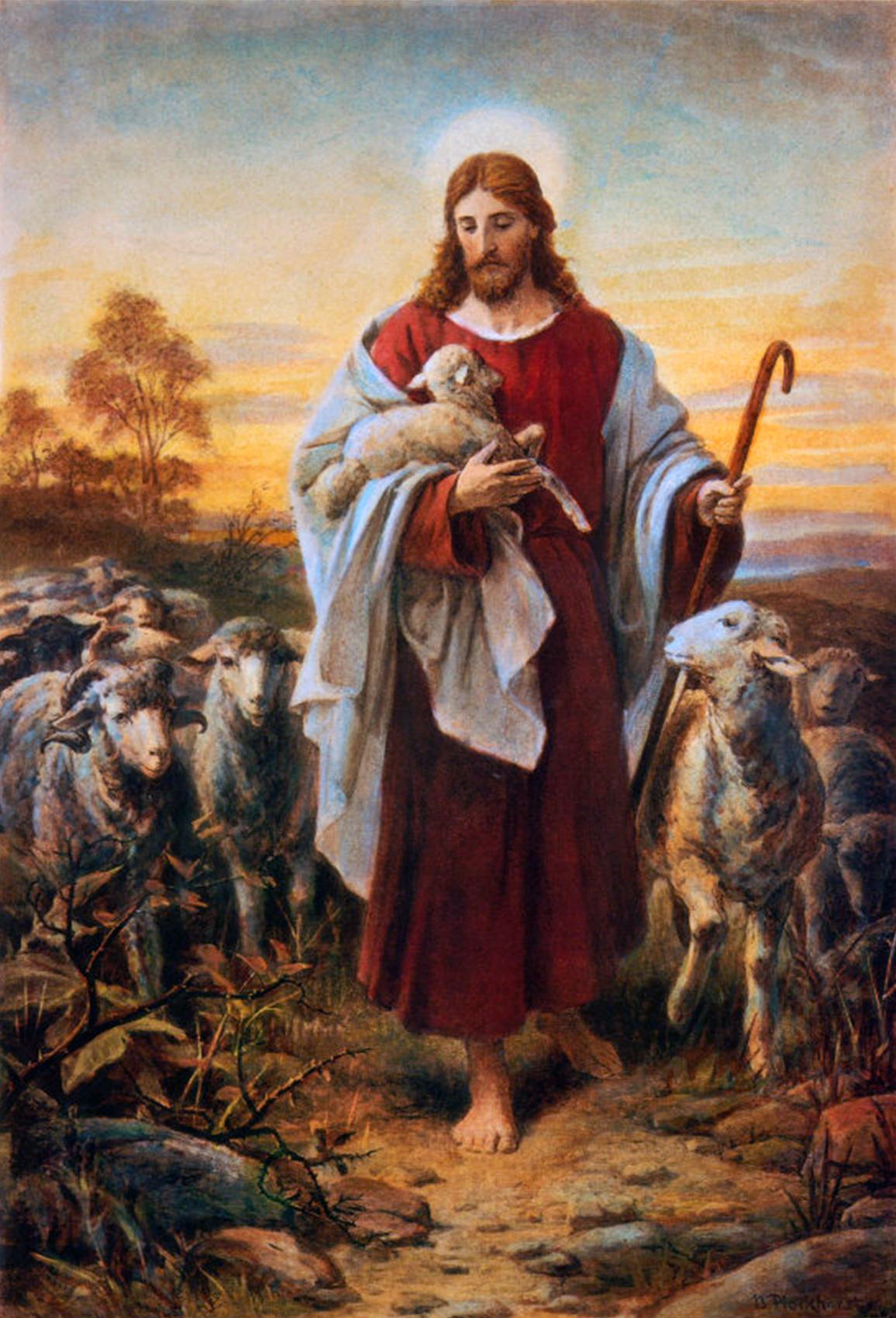
The Good Shepherd

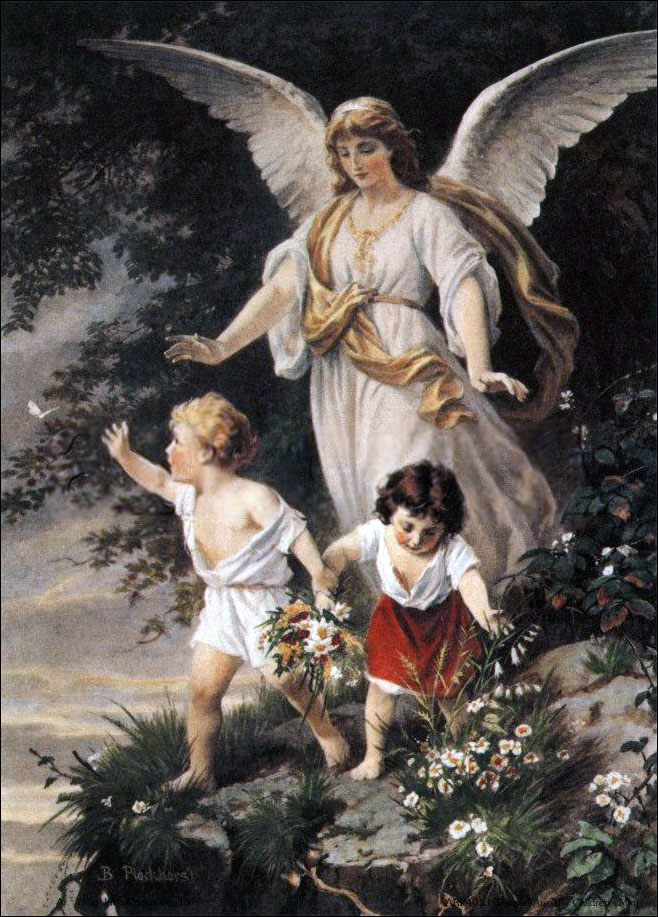
The Guardian Angel

Plockhorst was born in Braunschweig, Germany, where he had a 5-year education in lithography at the Collegium Carolinum, after which he trained to be a painter with Julius Schnorr von Carolsfeld in Dresden in 1848, with Carl von Piloty in Leipzig and Munich, and finally with Thomas Couture in Paris in 1853. In Munich Plockhorst copied the paintings of Rubens and Tizian in the Old Pinakothek. He also took study travels to Belgium, the Netherlands, and Italy before settling in Berlin where he began to paint portraits, but he also proved his talent for religious themes with a large painting (“Mary and John returning from the grave of Christ”). From 1866 to 1869 he was a professor at the Grandducal Saxonian Art School (Großherzoglich-Sächsische Kunstschule) in Weimar, where painter Otto Piltz was one of his pupils. Then Plockhorst returned to Berlin where he died in 1907. He is buried at the Stahnsdorf South-Western Cemetery.

== Work ==
Plockhorst was a member of the late Nazarene movement, a German Romantic art school (together with other German Protestant painters such as Karl Gottfried Pfannschmidt and Heinrich Ferdinand Hoffmann). Influenced by the Pre-Raphaelite Brotherhood, they had recourse to Medieval and religious art topics.

=== Religious topics ===
In 1872, Plockhorst exhibited a painting which was soon regarded as his chief work, “The Battle of archangel Michael with Satan for the body of Moses” (today in the Städtisches Museum, Cologne). His next major work was the altar painting “The Resurrection of Christ” for the cathedral of Marienburg, painted by order of the Prussian ministry of education and cultural affairs.

Further paintings showed “Christ taking his leave of his Mother”, “Christ on his way to Emmaus”, “Christ appearing to Maria Magdalena”, “The exposure of Moses”, “The finding of Moses”, “Let the children come to me” (also called “Jesus blessing the children”), “Luther on Christmas Eve” (1887) and “The adulteress before Christ” (the latter formerly in Moscow, gallery Löwenstein).

Plockhorst's painting The Guardian Angel (1886), showing an angel and two little children close to an abyss, was reproduced as a color lithography in thousands of copies and greatly influenced the later pictures of guardian angels.

The glass windows of several U.S. American churches show motifs taken from Plockhorst, e. g. "The Good Shepherd" in the Roman Catholic Cathedral of St. Paul in Birmingham, Alabama, “The Nativity” in the Emmanuel Episcopal Church in Shawnee, Oklahoma; "The Good Shepherd" in First Presbyterian Church in Tulsa, Oklahoma; “Moses presents the Ten Commandments to Aaron on the mount Sinai” in the First Congregational Church UCC, Owosso, Michigan; “The Good Shepherd” in the Zion Lutheran Church, Baltimore, MD, and “The Flight into Egypt” in the Stanford Memorial Church.

Plockhorst's oil painting “Noli me tangere”, which is more than two square meters large, had a remarkable fate. Originally, Plockhorst painted it for the German Court. Later, it was to be exhibited in England, but on September 3, 1880, the ship Sorata, with the painting on board, was stranded on rocks between Adelaide and Melbourne, drawing water into its hold to a depth of 5.5 metres. Much of the cargo was salvageable, but the artwork was completely encrusted by a white layer. It looked as if the sea water had decomposed the color particles. In this condition Prof. Francis Rouleaux, director of the Technische Hochschule in Berlin (now Technische Universität Berlin) and Commissioner General for the German Empire, took it to Melbourne, Australia. When the Melbourne International Exhibition was prepared in 1880, the art dealer Alexander Fletcher (1837–1914) bought the painting for a trifling sum and took it to the restorer George Peacock. Peacock discovered that the white layer was just plaster of Paris from the frame, which had been dissolved by the sea water. He could easily remove it, and Fletcher sold the restored painting to the National Gallery of Victoria for a considerable sum. At that time, the three largest daily newspapers of Melbourne reported extensively on that clever move.

=== Portraits ===
Plockhorst painted a portrait of the musician Franz Liszt (1857) and created portraits of other important people like the Leipzig publisher Tauchnitz, the Leipzig honorary citizen Carl Lampe, David Hansemann and the children of the family Platzmann. Besides, he portrayed members of the German nobility like Emperor Wilhelm I and his wife Augusta (1888; today in Berlin, National Gallery).

=== Illustrations ===
For the books of the Tauchnitz publishing house, Plockhorst drew different title-pages and frontispieces, e.g. for Three tales for Girls by the British author Dinah Maria Mulock Craik and for Charlotte M. Yonge's book The little Duke or Richard the Fearless. Ben Sylvester’s Word (1861). His illustrations for the following two books became very successful,

- From Bethlehem to Golgotha. The Life of our Lord and Savior Jesus Christ according to the four gospels by Karl Gerok (1881);
- Psalter and harp. New jubilee edition by Philipp Spitta, including 24 full-page illustrations, the portrait of Spitta, further illustrations and 42 initials.

=== Gallery ===
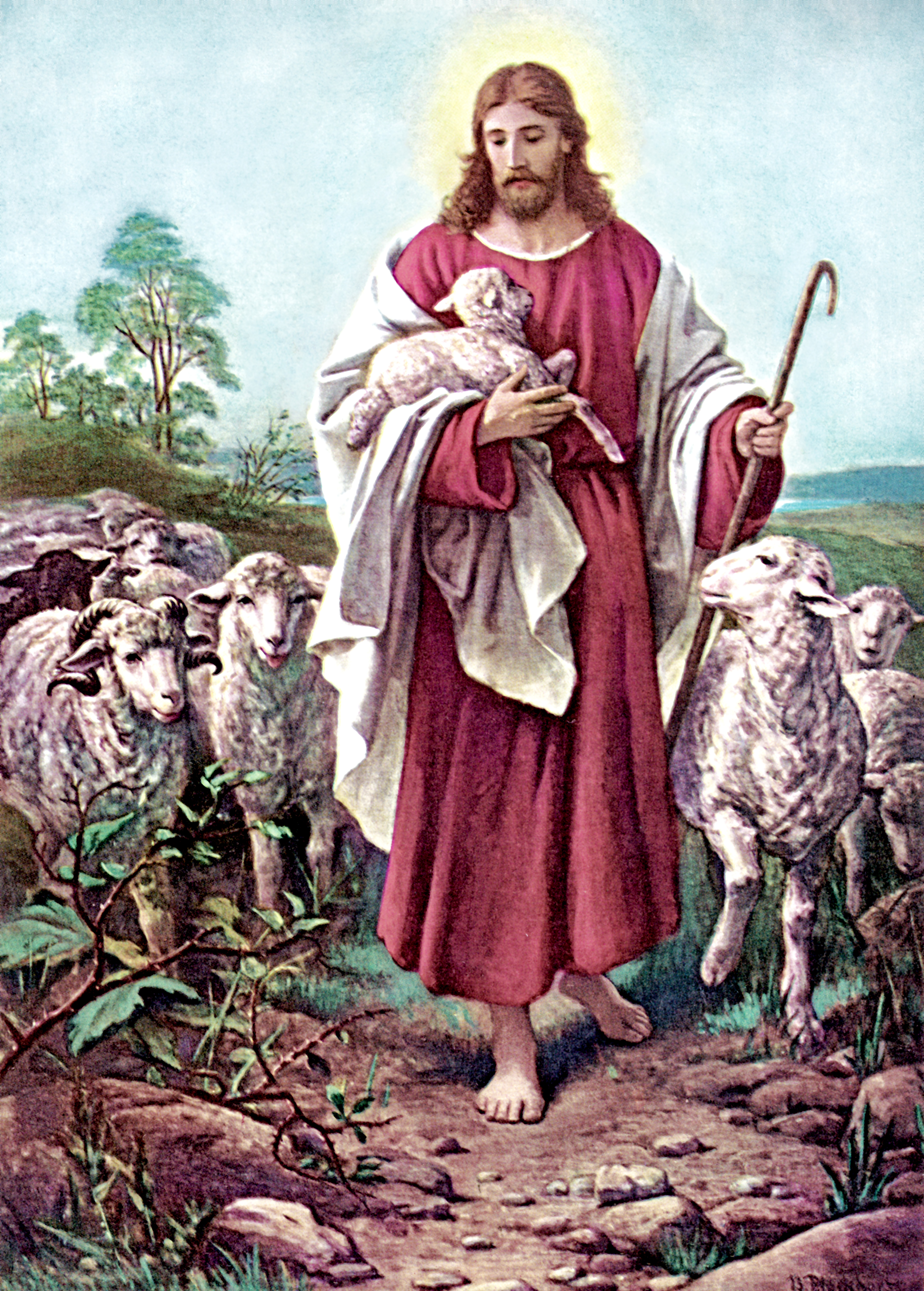
The Good Shepherd, 19th century by German Artist Bernhard Plockhorst

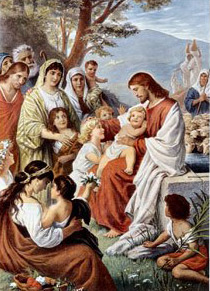
Christ Blessing the Children, 19th century by German Artist Bernhard Plockhorst

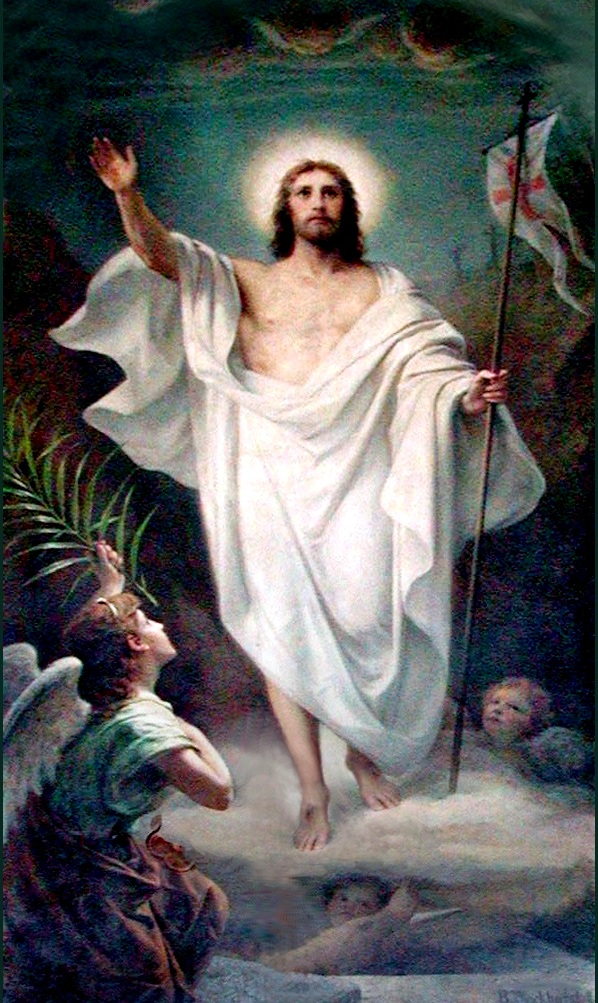
Victor over the Grave, 19th-century altarpiece by German Artist Bernhard Plockhorst

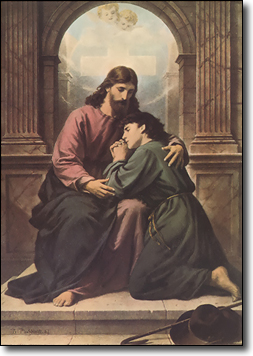
The Consoling Christ, 19th century by German Artist Bernhard Plockhorst

== Written sources ==
- Article on Bernhard Plockhorst, in: Brockhaus Konversations-Lexikon, vol. 13 (1895), p. 203.
