= Annerod =

Village in Germany

Coordinates: 50°34′N 8°45′E

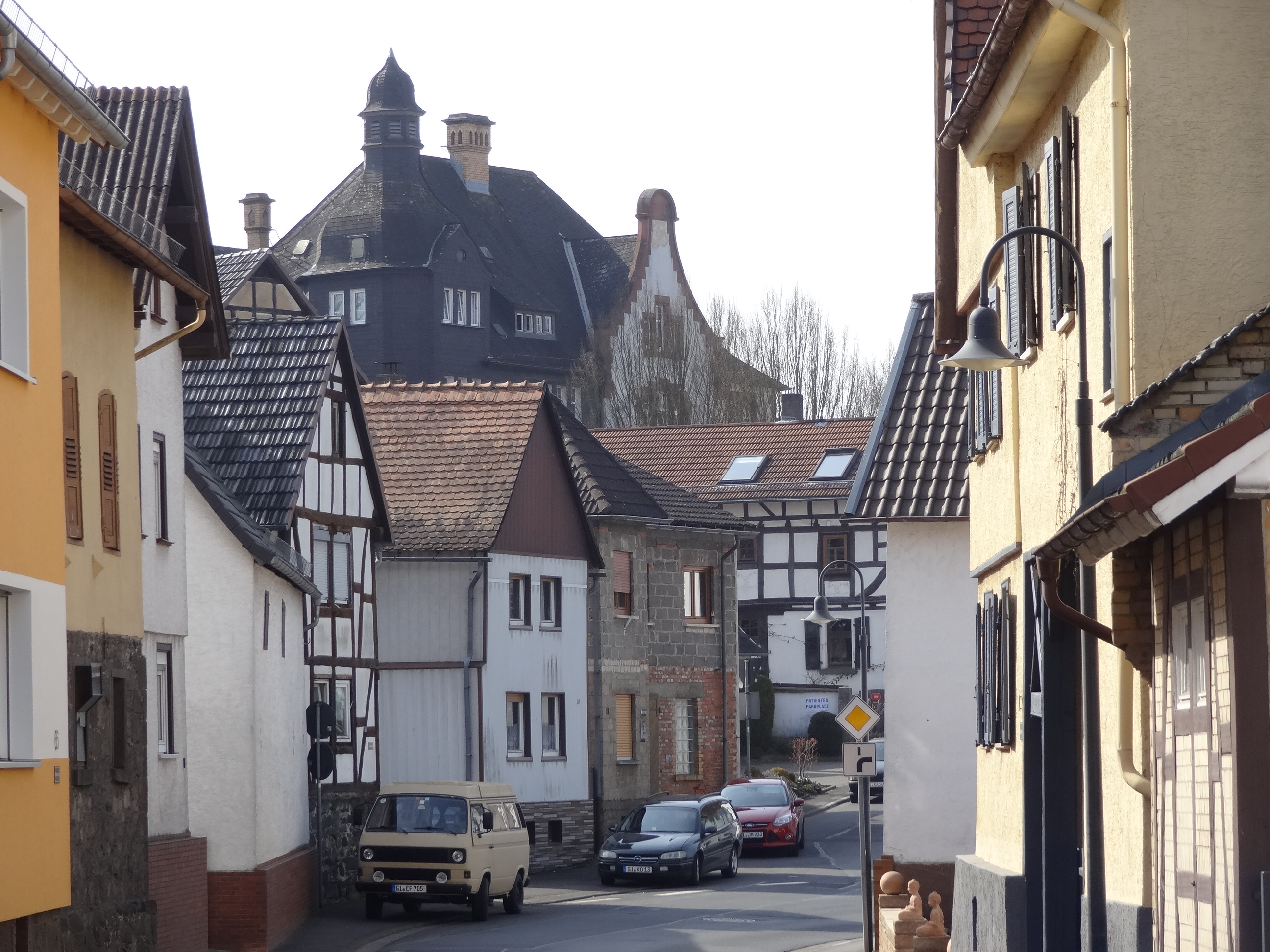
Historical center of the village

Annerod is a small village, part of the municipality Fernwald, in Germany between Gießen and Großen-Buseck approximately 70 km north of Frankfurt.

Annerod has a population of about 3189 people.
