= Willingshausen =

- Municipality
- Coat of arms

- Location of Willingshausen within Schwalm-Eder-Kreis district
- Interactive map of Willingshausen
- Location within Germany Location within Hesse
- Coordinates: 50°51′N 09°12′E
- Country: Germany
- State: Hesse
- Admin. region: Kassel
- District: Schwalm-Eder-Kreis

Government
  - Mayor (2021–27): Luca Fritsch

Area
  - Total: 59.95 km^{2} (23.15 sq mi)
- Elevation: 239 m (784 ft)

Population (2025-12-31)
  - Total: 4,503
  - Density: 75.11/km^{2} (194.5/sq mi)
- Time zone: UTC+01:00 (CET)
  - Summer (DST): UTC+02:00 (CEST)
- Postal codes: 34628
- Dialling codes: 06691 und 06697
- Vehicle registration: HR
- Website: www.willingshausen.de

Willingshausen is a municipality in the Schwalm-Eder district in Hesse, Germany.

== Geography ==
=== Location ===
The community of Willingshausen lies in the Schwalm area.

=== Neighbouring communities ===
Willingshausen borders in the north on the town of Schwalmstadt, in the northeast on the community of Frielendorf, in the east on the town of Neukirchen and the community of Schrecksbach (all in Schwalm-Eder), in the south on the town of Alsfeld and the community of Antrifttal (both in the Vogelsbergkreis), and in the west on the town of Neustadt (Marburg-Biedenkopf).

=== Constituent communities ===
Willingshausen consists of the ten centres of Gungelshausen, Leimbach, Loshausen, Merzhausen, Ransbach, Steina, Steinatal, Wasenberg (administrative seat), Willingshausen and Zella.

== Politics ==
=== After the >> local elections in 2021, the municipal council consists of 23 representatives distributed across 4 parties/factions. ===
SPD	8
CDU	7
BGL/FWG	5
fire department	3

== Culture and sightseeing ==
=== Willingshäuser Malerkolonie ===
The Willingshausen Painters' Colony is Germany's oldest artists' association. It was founded by a man from Livonia named Gerhardt Wilhelm von Reutern after he had been badly wounded in the Battle of the Nations at Leipzig in 1814 while serving as an officer in the Russian army; as a result, he had to have his right arm amputated. He came to convalesce with his brother's inlaws at the Schwertzellsche Haus in Willingshausen, where he met and got to know the lady whom in 1820 he would wed, Charlotte von Schwertzell. He settled down in Willingshausen and began to draw and paint. He procured an honorary stipend from the Russian Imperial Family, which afforded him financial independence.

In 1825 the Kassel painter Ludwig Emil Grimm, Jacob and Wilhelm Grimm's brother, came to Willingshausen to study landscapes. This is said to be the time when the colony was founded. Many painters worked – and still work today – at Willingshausen. The Museum "Malerstübchen" at the Gerhardt-von-Reutern-Haus documents the artists' work.

=== Regular events ===
Two music festivals take place each year in the constituent community of Loshausen, the "World Music Festival der Klangfreunde" on the first weekend of August, and "Rock im Park" in July.

== Economy and infrastructure ==
=== Transport ===
Federal Highway (Bundesstraße) B 254 (Homberg – Fulda) is about 6 km east of town. The Alsfeld-West interchange on Autobahn A 5 (Kassel – Frankfurt is about 15 km away.

The community belongs to the North Hesse Transport Network.
