= Kirtorf =

- Town
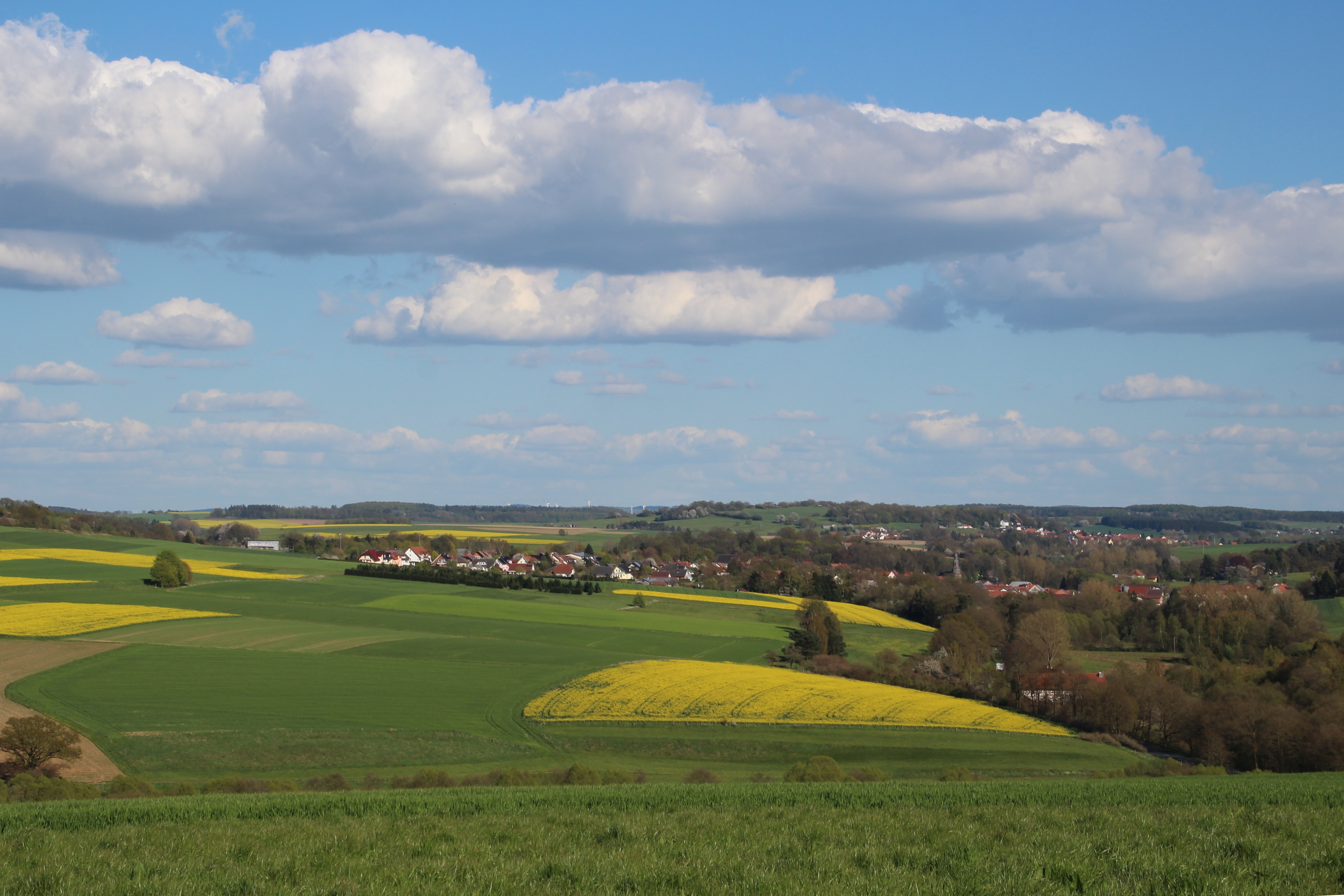

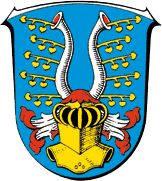
- Coat of arms

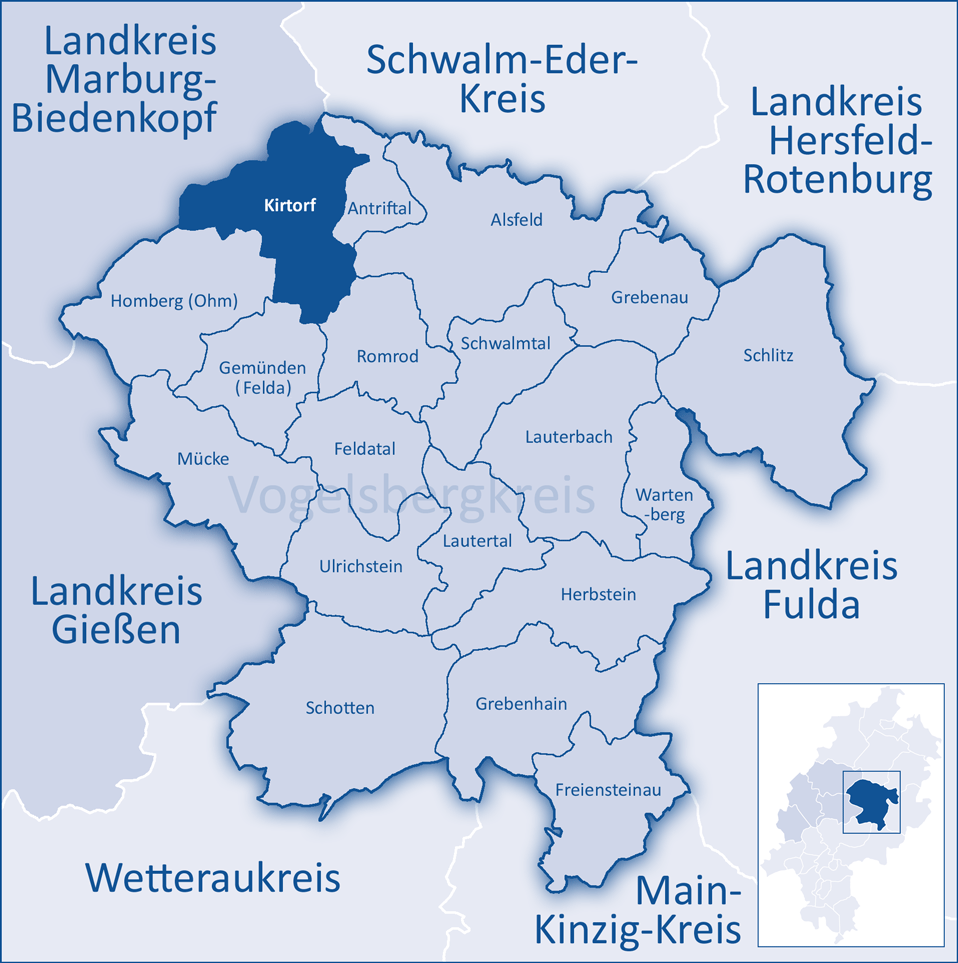
- Location of Kirtorf within Vogelsbergkreis district
- Interactive map of Kirtorf
- Location within Germany Location within Hesse
- Coordinates: 50°46′N 09°6′E
- Country: Germany
- State: Hesse
- Admin. region: Gießen
- District: Vogelsbergkreis
- Subdivisions: 7 Stadtteile

Government
  - Mayor (2018–24): Andreas Fey (Ind.)

Area
  - Total: 79.91 km^{2} (30.85 sq mi)
- Elevation: 215–388 m (705–1,273 ft)

Population (2025-12-31)
  - Total: 3,082
  - Density: 38.57/km^{2} (99.89/sq mi)
- Time zone: UTC+01:00 (CET)
  - Summer (DST): UTC+02:00 (CEST)
- Postal codes: 36320
- Dialling codes: 06635
- Vehicle registration: VB
- Website: www.stadt-kirtorf.de

Kirtorf (German: [ˈkɪʁtɔʁf]) is a town in the northern Vogelsbergkreis in Hesse, Germany. Through the town runs the Deutsche Märchenstraße, or German Fairytale Road, a touristic route joining many of the places commonly associated with the Brothers Grimm's tales.

== Geography ==
The town lies at the top of the Rhine-Weser watershed between the east-flowing Antrift and the west-flowing Gleen.

=== Neighbouring municipalities ===
Kirtorf borders in the north on the town of Neustadt (Marburg-Biedenkopf), in the east on the municipality of Antrifttal, the town of Alsfeld and the municipality of Romrod, in the south on the municipality of Gemünden, and in the west on the town of Homberg (Ohm), and the town of Stadtallendorf (Marburg-Biedenkopf).

=== Constituent municipalities ===
Besides the town's main centre, which bears the same name as the whole municipality, there are outlying centres named Arnshain, Gleimenhain, Heimertshausen, Lehrbach, Ober-Gleen and Wahlen.

== History ==
Kirtorf was mentioned in a document as Gleene in 917. Kirtorf was the seat of a Sendgericht, a church court that tried cases of sin, vice and the like, under the Bishopric of Mainz. This court included 40 places. From 1205, the town belonged to the Abbey of Fulda, the Counts of Ziegenhain were the Vögte ( ≈ sheriffs) here and held jurisdiction in the Eußergericht court district until the 14th century. By 1366, the Landgraves of Hesse had come into ownership of some parts of the court district. Kirtorf's town rights were granted in 1489. On 1 April 1725, the town almost completely burnt down; only the town hall (built in 1559) was left standing and unscathed.

=== Amalgamations ===
All constituent municipalities named above were united as part of Hesse's municipal reforms in 1971.

== Politics ==
Mayor is Andreas Fey, who is indeed a member of the SPD, but entered the election as an independent candidate and won against his challenger Karsten Jost with 51% of the vote.

Honorary Mayor is Ulrich Künz. He was elected mayor of the city on March 11, 1977. He was from 11 March 1977 to 11 March 2019 mayor and thus the longest serving in Germany. On February 15, 2019, he was appointed mayor. The UWL / SPD faction voted in favor.

Kirtorf's town council has 23 councillors. As of municipal elections held on 6 March 2016 the seats are apportioned thus:

FWG/CDU	: 17 seats
SPD/UWL	: 6 seats

Note: FWG and UWL are citizens' coalitions.

=== Coat of arms ===
Kirtorf's civic coat of arms shows the helmet and crest of the Counts of Hesse. The oldest example of the arms is in a seal dating from 1489. Some former versions of the town's arms have red as the background colour instead of blue.

=== Town partnerships ===
- Kilb, Austria, since 1983

== Culture and sightseeing ==
=== Museums ===
- Museum Kirtorf

=== Buildings ===
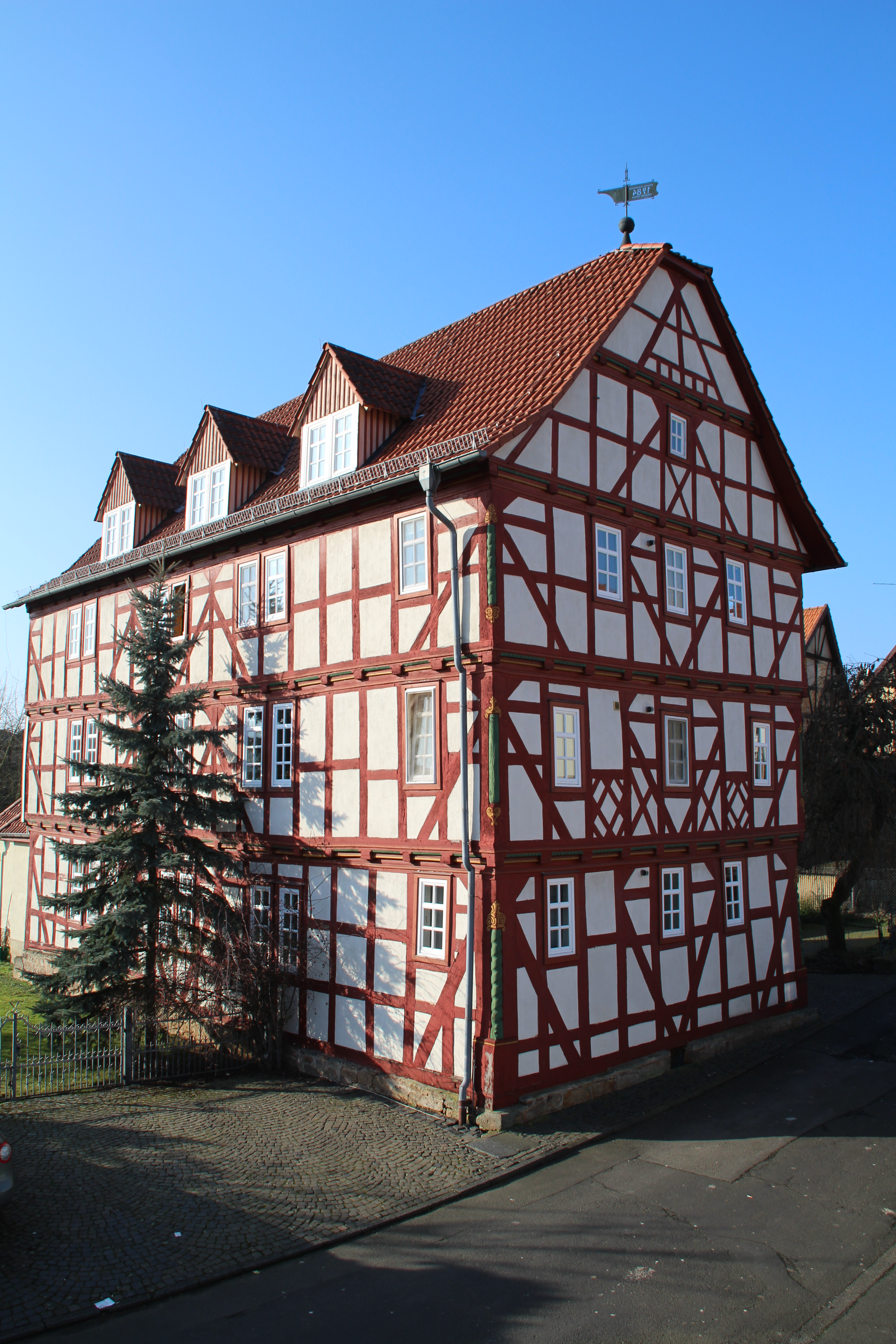
Doktorhaus

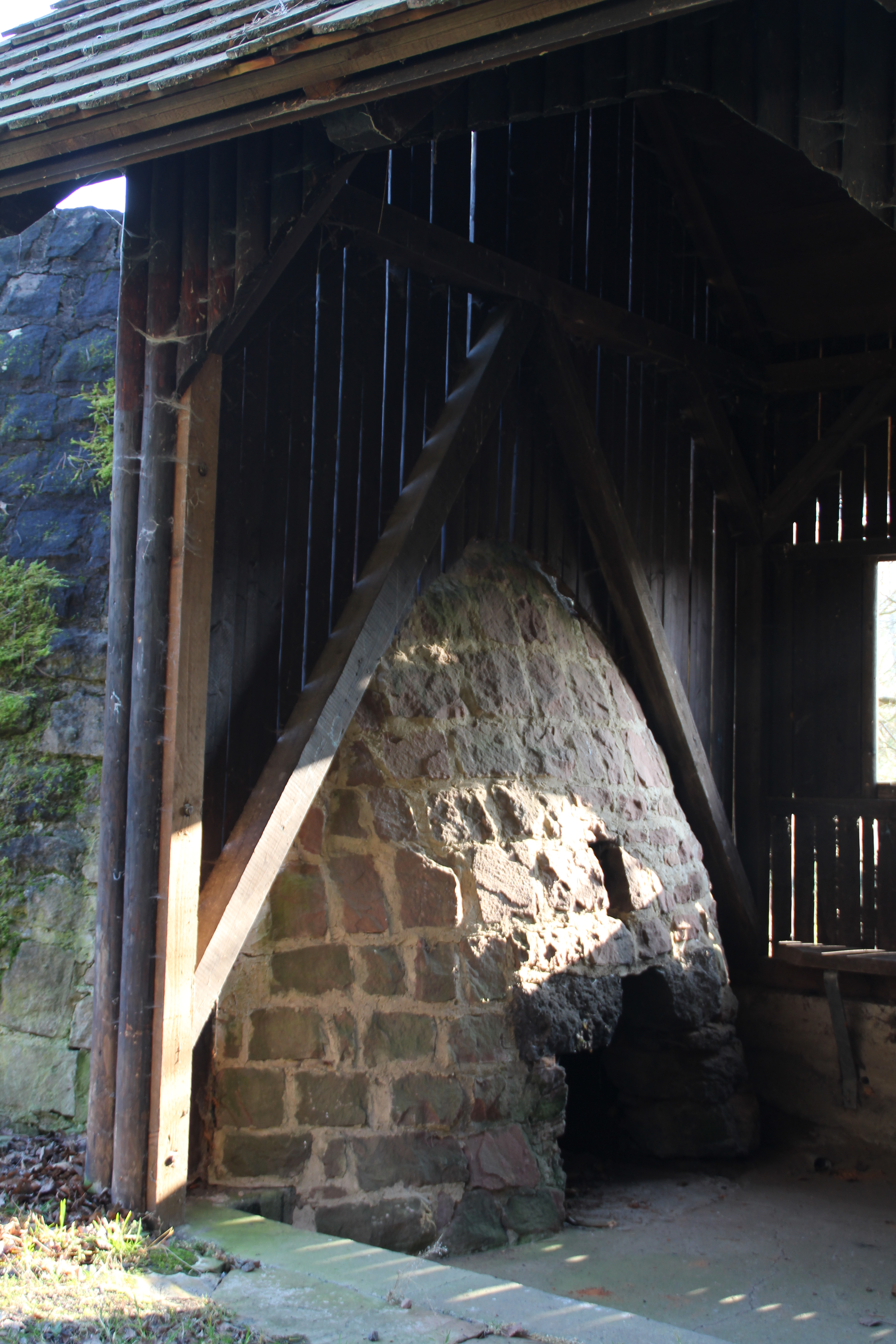
Schmeerofen

- Historic marketplace with town hall
- Doktorhaus in Kirtorf
- Schmerofen ("Leaf Fat Oven") near Kirtorf
- Lehrbach castle ruins
- Schmitthof with the historic Waldmühle (forest mill) in Lehrbach
- Kirschbrücke ("Cherry Bridge") in Lehrbach (built in 1541)
- "Kirchenstumpf" ("Church Stump") in Lehrbach (remains of a chapel from the time before Saint Boniface. This chapel was built by Irish-Scottish monks who – unlike Boniface – preached a Christianity independent of the Pope.)
- Nellenburg (castle) near Gleimenhain

== Economy and infrastructure ==
=== Transport ===
Through the town runs Federal Highway (Bundesstraße) B 62.
