= Felix Döring =

German politician (born 1991)

Felix Döring MdB
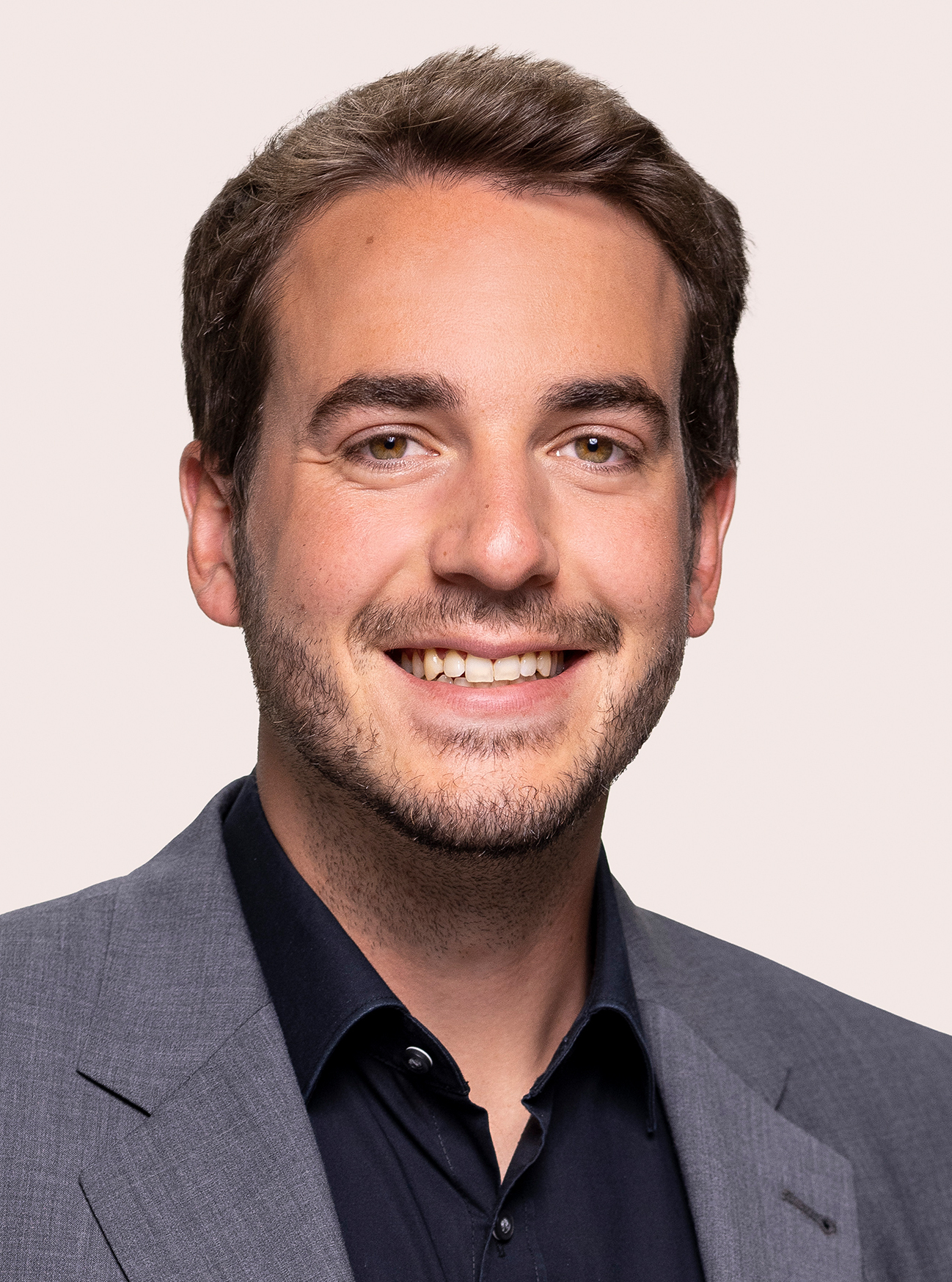
- Döring in 2021

Member of the Bundestag; from Hesse
- Incumbent
- Assumed office 26 October 2021
- Preceded by: Helge Braun
- Constituency: Gießen (2021–2025); State list (2025–present)

Personal details
- Born: Felix Maximilian Döring; 23 February 1991 (age 35) Giessen, Germany
- Party: Social Democratic
- Education: University of Giessen

Felix Döring (born 23 February 1991) is a German teacher and politician of the Social Democratic Party (SPD) who has been serving as a member of the Bundestag since 2021, representing the Giessen district.

== Political career ==
Döring was elected directly to the Bundestag in 2021.

In parliament, Döring has been serving on the Committee on Family Affairs, Senior Citizens, Women and Youth. Since 2025, he has also been an alternate member of the Budget Committee, where he serves as his parliamentary group's rapporteur on the annual annual budget of the Federal Ministry for Economic Cooperation and Development.

Within his parliamentary group, Döring belongs to the Parliamentary Left, a left-wing movement.

== Other activities ==
- Education and Science Workers' Union (GEW), Member
