= Fernwald =

- Municipality
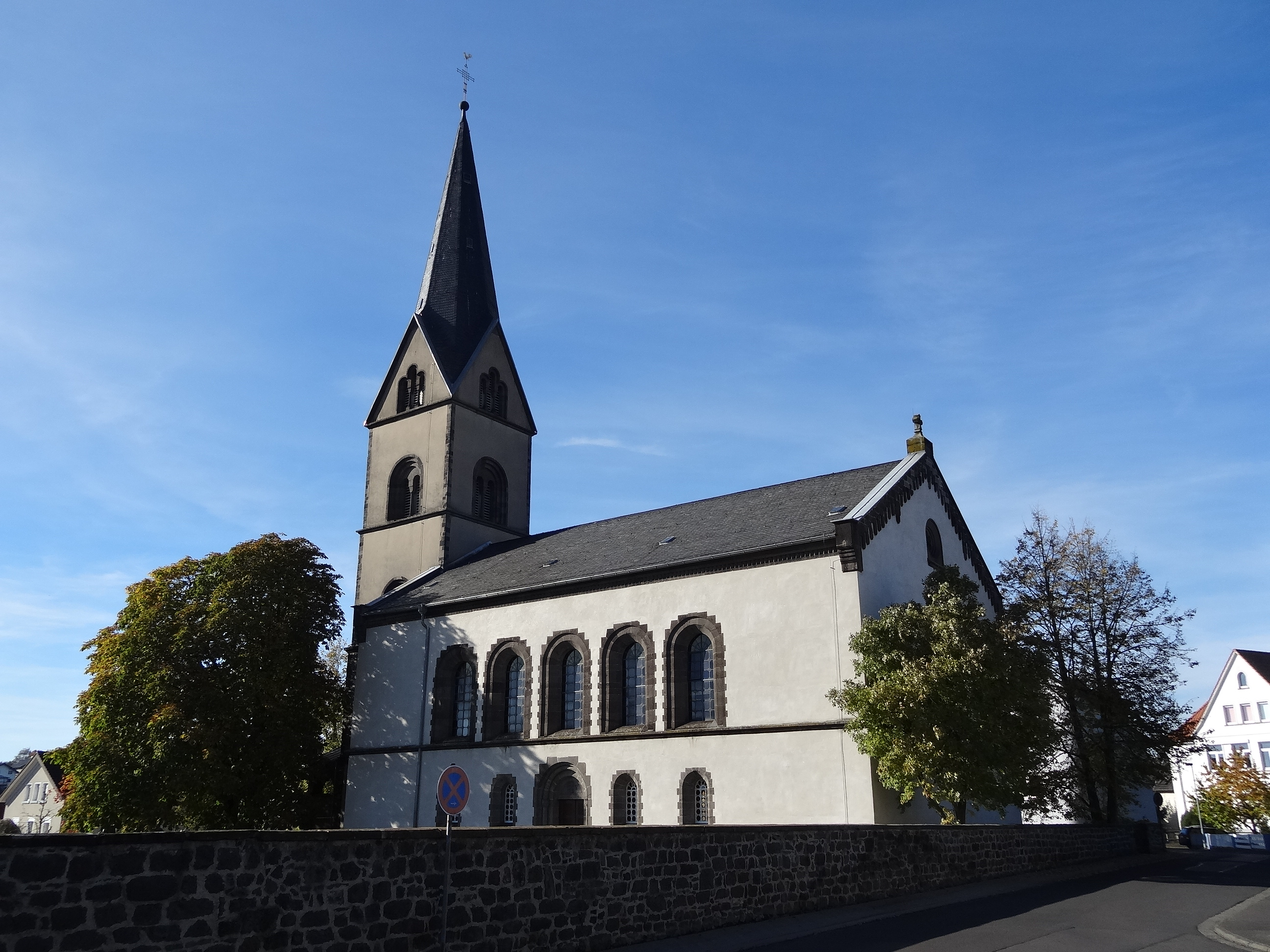
- Lutheran church in Steinbach

- Coat of arms

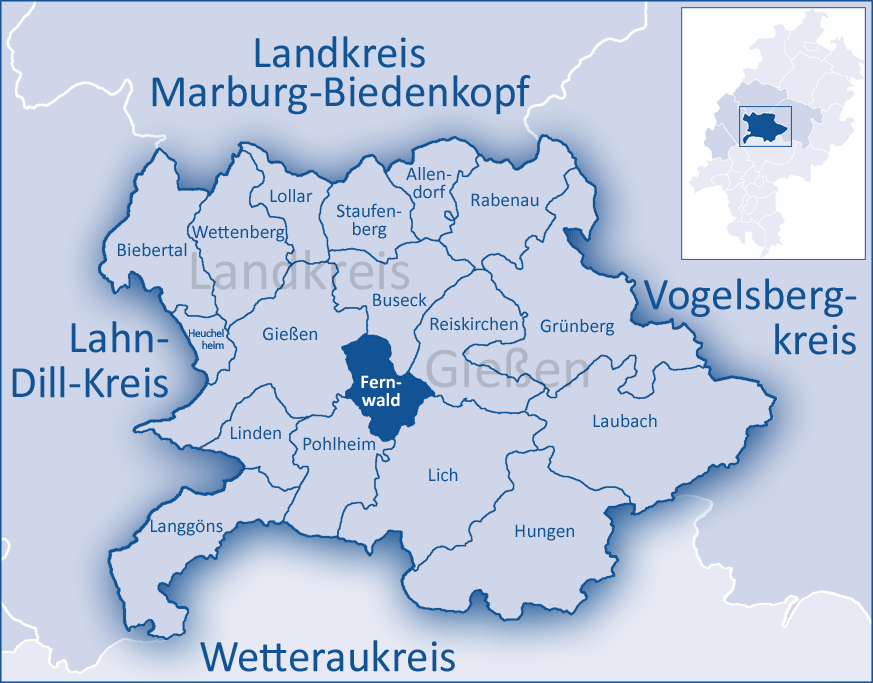
- Location of Fernwald within Gießen district
- Interactive map of Fernwald
- Location within Germany Location within Hesse
- Coordinates: 50°33′N 08°47′E
- Country: Germany
- State: Hesse
- Admin. region: Gießen
- District: Gießen
- Subdivisions: 3 Ortsteile

Government
  - Mayor (2021–27): Manuel Rosenke (Ind.)

Area
  - Total: 21.57 km^{2} (8.33 sq mi)
- Elevation: 219 m (719 ft)

Population (2025-12-31)
  - Total: 7,160
  - Density: 332/km^{2} (860/sq mi)
- Time zone: UTC+01:00 (CET)
  - Summer (DST): UTC+02:00 (CEST)
- Postal codes: 35463
- Dialling codes: 06404, 0641
- Vehicle registration: GI
- Website: www.fernwald.de

Fernwald (German pronunciation: [ˈfɛʁnvalt]) is a municipality in the German state of Hesse, located 40 miles (64 kilometers) north of Frankfurt am Main and 4.4 miles (7 kilometers) east of Gießen. Fernwald is part of the district of Gießen.

== History ==
Fernwald was created in 1971 by integrating the former independent communities of Steinbach, Annerod, and Albach.

== Regional Businesses ==
- ADF Allgemeine Datenbank für Forderungseinzug GmbH
- AfU - Agentur für Unternehmensnachrichten GmbH
- Rovema Verpackungsmaschinen GmbH
