= Uwe Schulz =

German politician

Member of the Bundestag
- Incumbent
- Assumed office 2017

Personal details
- Born: 12 December 1961 (age 64) Gießen
- Party: Alternative for Germany

Uwe Schulz (born 12 December 1961 in Gießen) is a German politician for Alternative for Germany (AfD) and since 2017 a member of the Bundestag.

== Life ==
Schulz started a study of law in 1982 and quit this without a degree in 1988. He worked for Avis Car Rental in Frankfurt am Main. From 1982 to 1995 Schulz was member of CDU. Since 2013 he is member of AfD. 2015 he signed the Erfurter Resolution. Since 2017 he is member of Bundestag.

His main political interests are in "digitization" of business in Germany.
