= Antrifttal =

- Municipality
- Flag Coat of arms

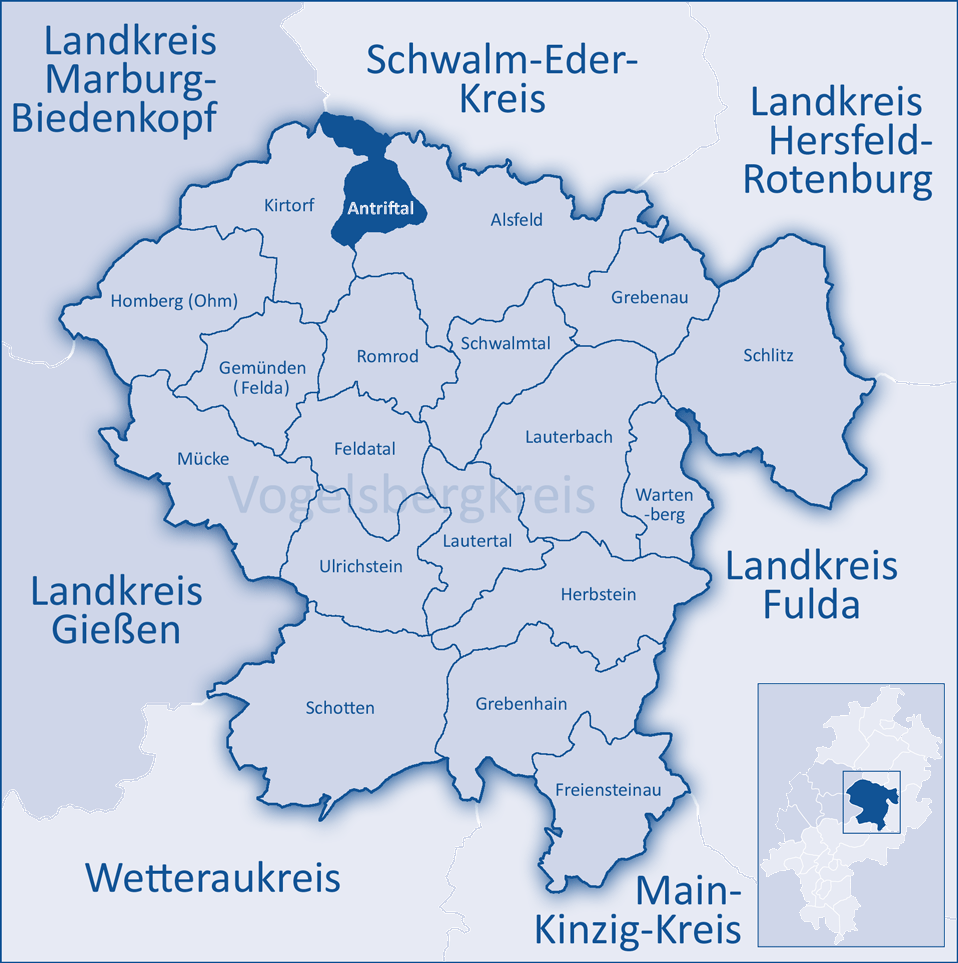
- Location of Antrifttal within Vogelsbergkreis district
- Interactive map of Antrifttal
- Location within Germany Location within Hesse
- Coordinates: 50°46′N 9°11′E
- Country: Germany
- State: Hesse
- Admin. region: Gießen
- District: Vogelsbergkreis

Government
  - Mayor (2019–25): Dietmar Krist (CDU)

Area
  - Total: 26.59 km^{2} (10.27 sq mi)
- Elevation: 298 m (978 ft)

Population (2025-12-31)
  - Total: 1,722
  - Density: 64.76/km^{2} (167.7/sq mi)
- Time zone: UTC+01:00 (CET)
  - Summer (DST): UTC+02:00 (CEST)
- Postal codes: 36326
- Dialling codes: 06631, 06635 und 06692
- Vehicle registration: VB
- Website: www.antrifttal.de

Antrifttal (German pronunciation: [ˈantʁɪftˌtaːl], lit. 'Antrift Valley') is a municipality in the Vogelsbergkreis in Hesse, Germany.

== Geography ==
=== Location ===
Antrifttal lies, as its name suggests, in the valley (Tal) of a brook called the Antrift, a tributary to the Schwalm, between the Vogelsberg in the south and the Knüllgebirge in the northeast (low mountain ranges).

The municipal area of 26.59 km^{2} is 54% agricultural (14.3 km^{2}).

=== Neighbouring municipalities ===
Antrifttal borders in the north on the municipality of Willingshausen (Schwalm-Eder-Kreis), in the east and south on the town of Alsfeld, in the west on the town of Kirtorf, and in the northwest on the town of Neustadt (Marburg-Biedenkopf).

=== Constituent municipalities ===
- Main town: Ruhlkirchen
- Constituent municipalities:
  - Bernsburg
  - Ohmes
  - Ruhlkirchen
  - Seibelsdorf
  - Vockenrod

==== Ohmes ====
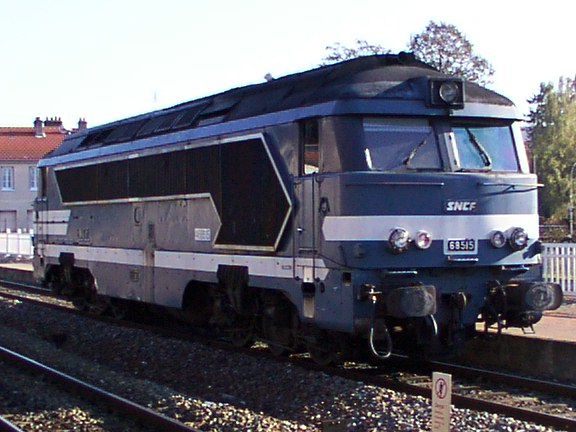
View of Ohmes

Ohmes is presumably based on a settlement already in existence by Roman times, making it one of the oldest places in the Vogelsbergkreis, and the oldest in the Katzenberg, a mediaeval court district in this area. Ohmes had its first documentary mention in 1240 under the name Omeza. It got its name from a body of water called the Omena that welled up just below the village.

In 1240, a third of the village came into the ownership of the Hersfeld Monastery. There was a noble family, the Lords of Ohmes, but they died out in the 13th century. The other two thirds of the village belonged to the court district of Katzenberg under the Counts of Ziegenhain, with its seat at Ruhlkirchen. The one constant in Ohmes's history during the Middle Ages was change, and the village saw a whole series of rulers, from various lords who held the Katzenberg, to the Teutonic Knights, to Hans von Dornberg the Landgrave of Hesse, and above all the Archbishopric of Mainz.

The German Peasants' War and the Thirty Years' War took their toll on the village with their robbery, plundering, rape, mistreatment and widespread destruction, and while the village had 40 households in 1580, by 1630 it had only 33.

In the early 19th century, the village passed from the Archbishopric of Mainz to the Bishopric of Fulda, remaining with it until 1889. On 1 January 1971, the until then independent municipality of Ohmes was amalgamated with Antrifttal

At about the turn of the 20th century, the Reverend Williges Kraiger had a church with a vestry built by J. Bensheimer from Dieburg. It was consecrated "Zur Heiligen Familie von Nazareth" ("To the Holy Family of Nazareth"), with Williges as its secondary patron. It cost 35,277 marks.

==== Vockenrod ====
Vockenrod was presumably founded along with the hereditary estate of Erbleihehof Hermannshain in the 12th century, and was first named in a document in 1263. In 1283, it was part of the court district of Katzenberg under the Counts of Ziegenhain. In the late 14th century, Vockenrod and Hermannshain were both destroyed in a dispute between the County of Hessen and the Archbishopric of Mainz, and it was a hundred years before anyone settled there again.

Vockenrod had the same procession of mediaeval rulers as Ohmes (see above). The same wars also wrought heavy destruction on Vockenrod, reducing the village from 20 households in 1580 to only 12 in 1630. Vockenrod likewise also passed to the Bishopric of Fulda in the early 19th century, remaining with it until 1889, and was amalgamated with Antrifttal on the same day as Ohmes. The church that stands today was built only in 1908 under the leadership of Greifzu, an architect from Mainz (and with significant citizen contributions). It was consecrated "Allerheiligsten Jungfrau Maria", with Saint Boniface as its secondary patron. It cost 40,568 marks. Within are to be seen elements of Art Nouveau as well as a noteworthy altar bearing, among other things, scenes from Saint Boniface's life.

== History ==
The municipality came into being only on 1 January 1972 through the amalgamation of four municipalities in the Katzenberg and Bernsburg.
