= Toter Mann (Seulingswald) =

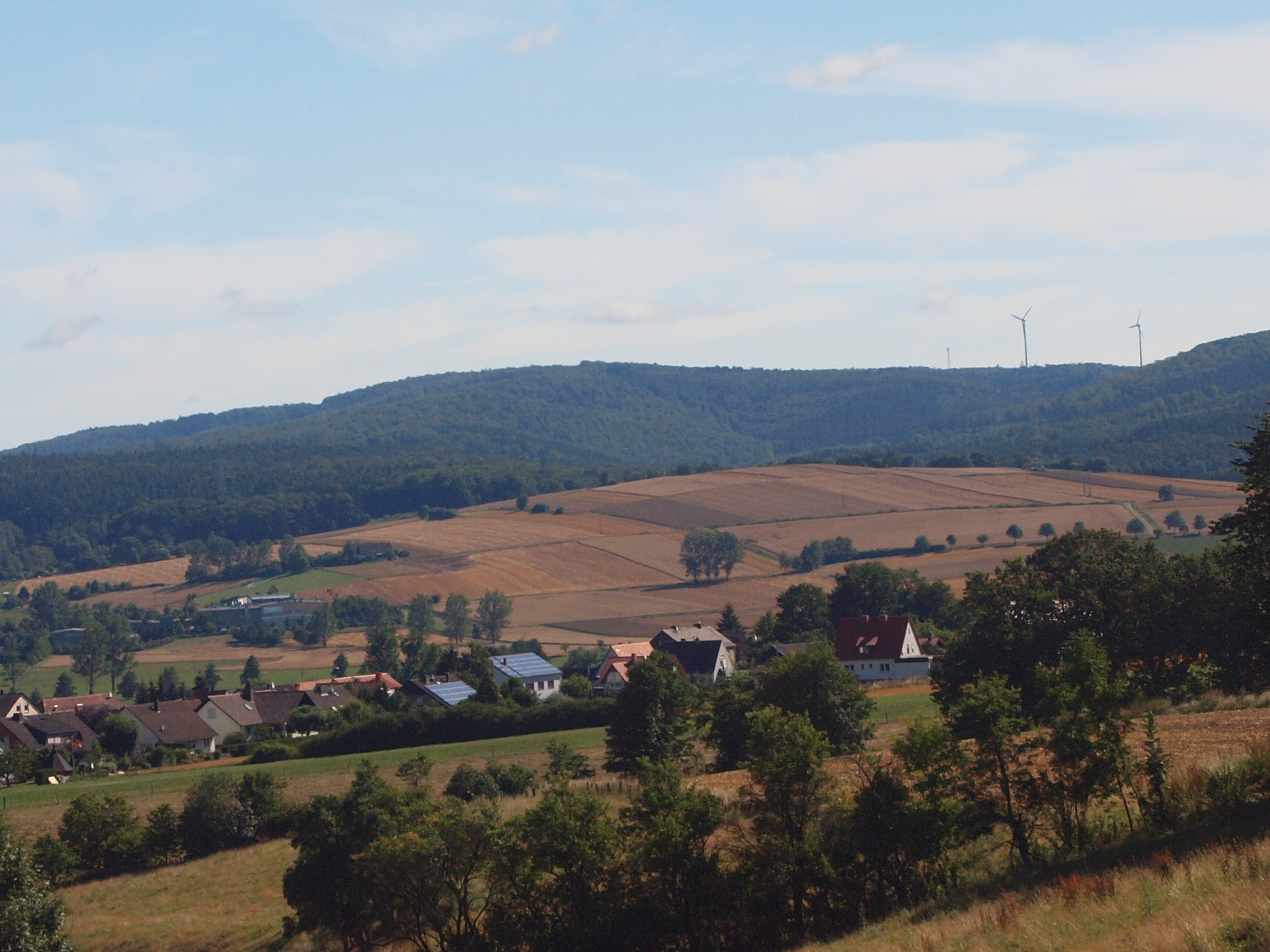
- View from Petersberg over the houses of Sorga in the Solz valley looking NE to the Toter Mann, the highest hill in the Seulingswald

Highest point
- Elevation: 480.3 m above sea level (NHN) (1,576 ft)
- Coordinates: 50°54′1″N 9°50′20.1″E

Geography
- Location within Hesse
- Location: near Friedewald; Hersfeld-Rotenburg, Hesse, Germany
- Parent range: Seulingswald

Geology
- Mountain type: ridge
- Rock type: Sandstone

The Toter Mann near Friedewald in the Hessian county of Hersfeld-Rotenburg is, at 480.3 m above sea level (NHN), the highest natural hill in the Seulingswald range. This small upland is the southernmost spur of the Fulda-Werra Uplands.

== Geography ==
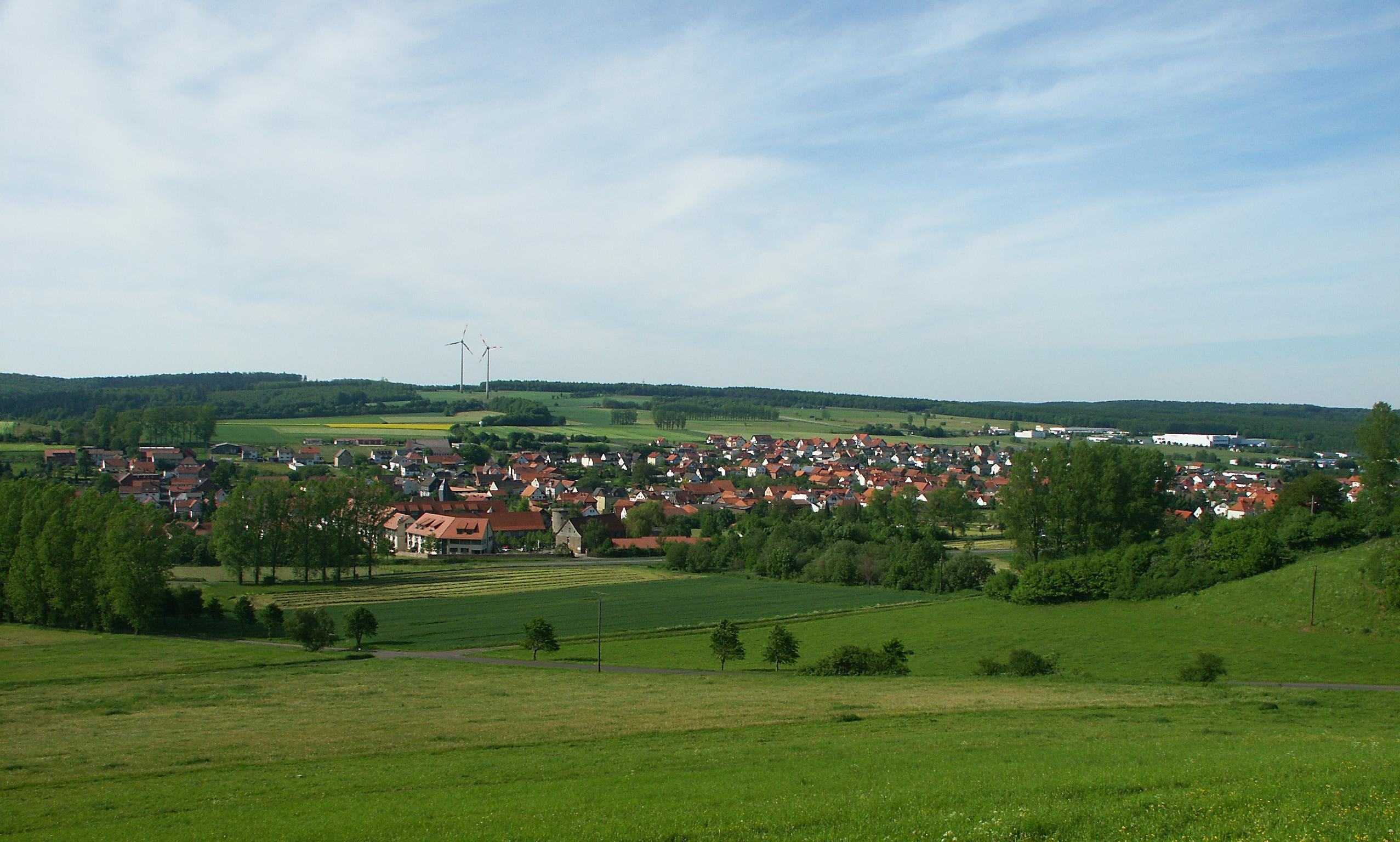
View from the slopes of the Dreienberg over Friedewald looking N to the Toter Mann

=== Location ===
The Toter Mann lies in the southernmost part of the Seulingswald. Its summit is 2.5 kilometres north of Friedewald and lies on its municipal territory. Its southwestern hillside lies in the municipality of Kathus, near Solz in the borough of Bad Hersfeld. Its western slopes are in the parish of Meckbach, 3.8 km northwest of the summit, a village on the banks of the Meckbach, a tributary of the Fulda, and in the municipality of Ludwigsau. Its northeastern hillside is in the municipality of Ronshausen, which is traversed by the Fulda tributary of the Ulfe. The Faßdorf estate belonging to Ronshausen in the valley of the Breitenbach lies 4.1 km, as the crow flies, north of the summit.

On the western slopes of the hill rises the Fulda tributary of the Meckbach with its many feeder streams (e.g. the Kirchgrund, Sälig and Finstertal). The Ulfe tributary, the Breitenbach, runs east and north of the hill. On the southwestern slopes, rises the Breitzbach, a tributary of the Solz.

=== Natural regions ===
The Toter Mann is part of the natural region of the Seulingswald (357.20), in the subunit of Solztrotten and Seulingswald (357) in the major unit of the Fulda-Werra Uplands (357) and in the major unit group of the East Hesse Highlands (no. 35).
