= Seulingswald =

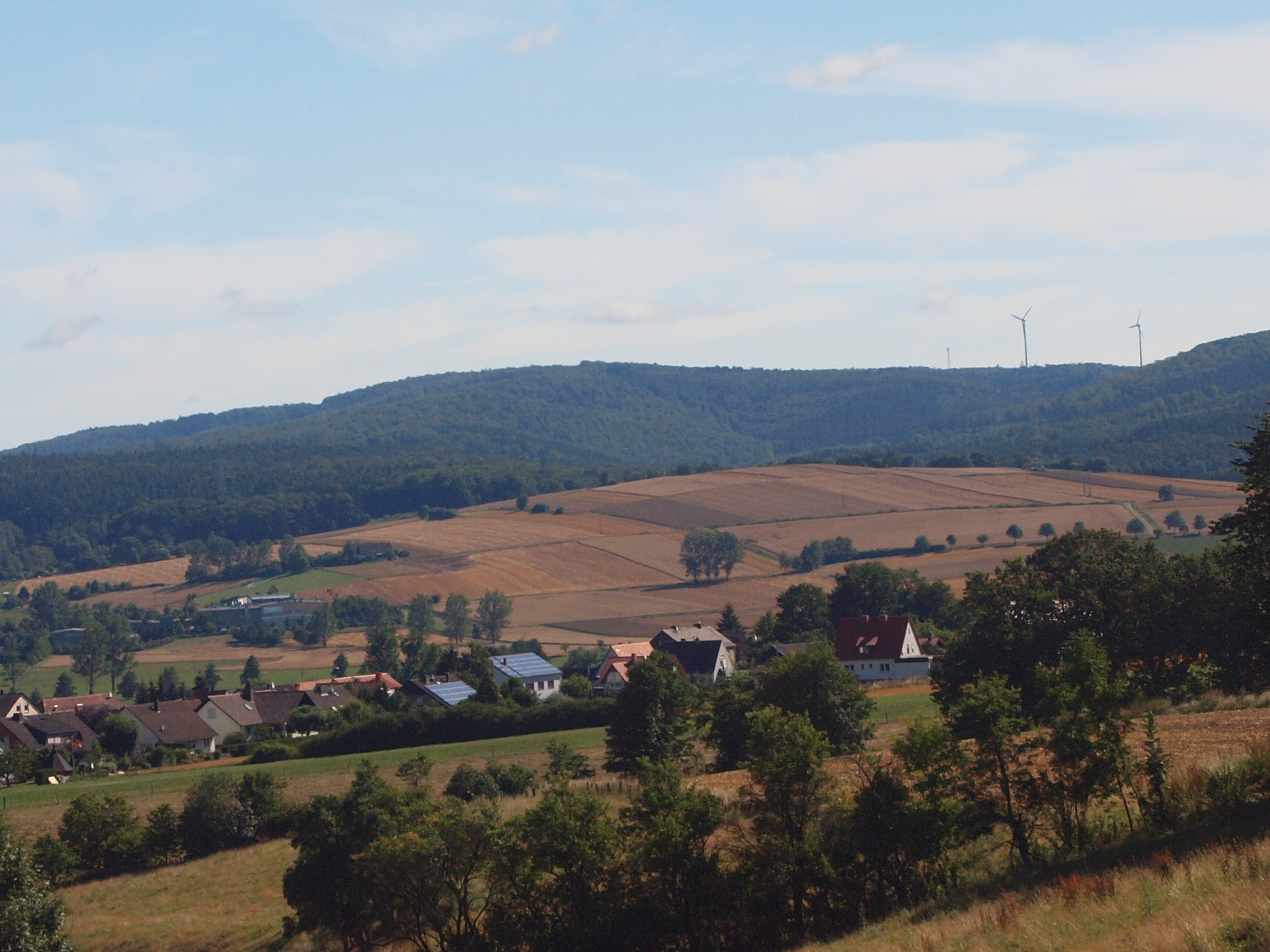
- View from Petersberg over the houses of Sorga in the Solz valley looking NE to the Toter Mann, the highest hill in the Seulingswald

Highest point
- Peak: Toter Mann
- Elevation: 480.3 m (1,576 ft); DE-NHN

Geography
- State(s): Hersfeld-Rotenburg and Wartburgkreis; Hesse and Thuringia, Germany
- Range coordinates: 50°54′1″N 9°50′20.1″E
- Parent range: Fulda-Werra Uplands in the East Hesse Highlands

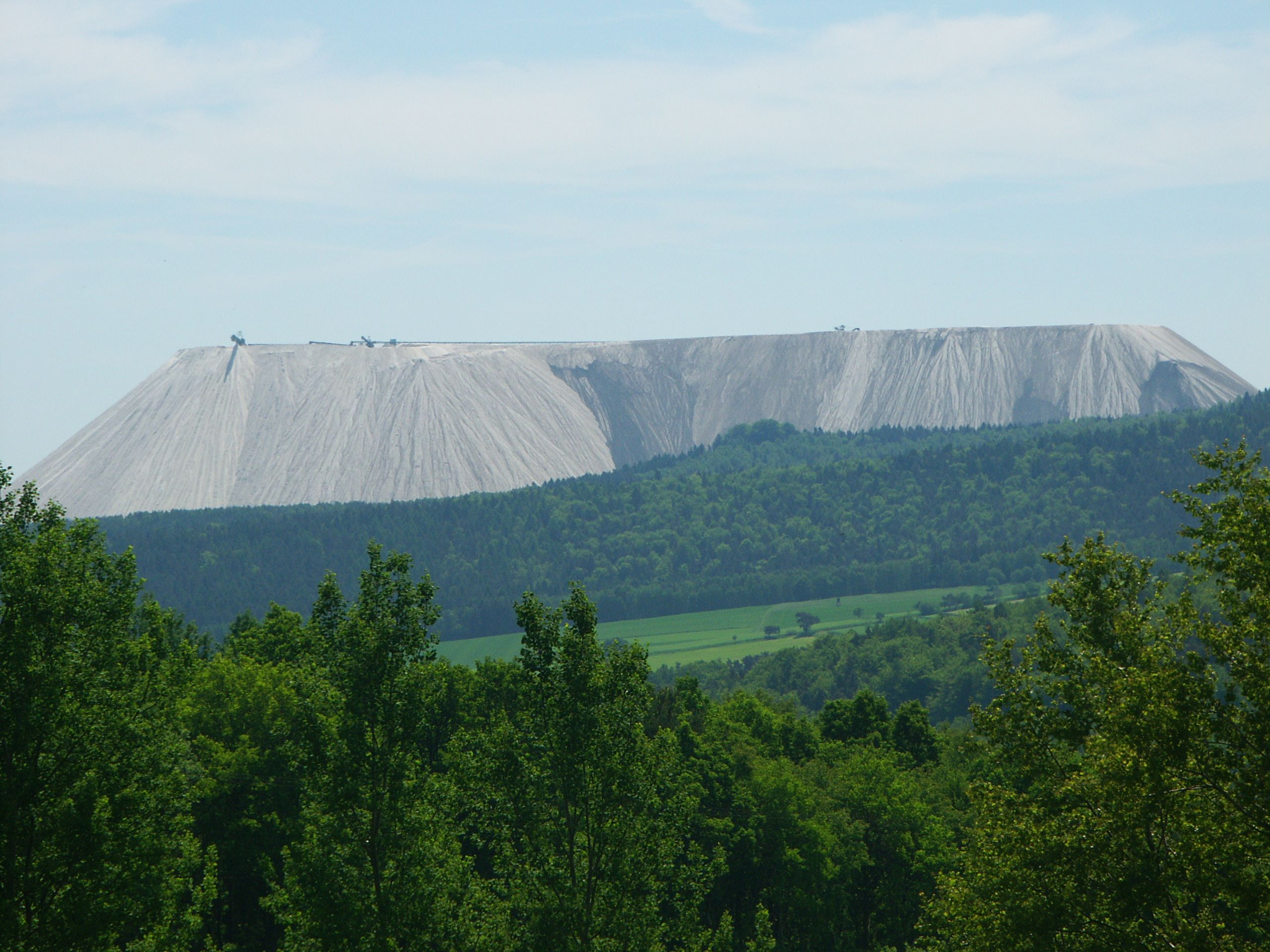
The Hornungskuppe and Monte Kali

The Seulingswald (also called the Sillingswald) is a hill range in the German Central Uplands which reaches heights of up to 480.3 m above sea level (NHN). It is part of the Fulda-Werra Uplands in the East Hesse Highlands within the Hessian county of Hersfeld-Rotenburg; small ridges extend into the Thuringian county of Wartburgkreis. It is a sandstone range and one of the largest contiguous woodland areas in Hesse.

== Geography ==
=== Location ===
The Seulingswald is located between the settlements of Ronshausen to the north and Wildeck to the northeast (both in Hesse), Großensee and Dankmarshausen to the east-northeast (both in Thuringia), Heringen to the east, Friedewald to the south, Bad Hersfeld to the southwest, Ludwigsau to the west and Bebra to the northwest (all in Hesse).

To the north, on the other side of the Ulfe valley, are the Richelsdorf Hills. To the east the little hill range borders on the Werra. Small-scale east-northeastern spurs descend on the far side of Hessian Kleinensee to the River Suhl near Thuringian Großensee. In the south the nearest streams are the Fulda and Werra on the heights of Friedewald before their confluence. This delineates the southern boundary of the Seulingswald, which transitions here into the Kuppen Rhön. To the west, on the far side of the Fulda, is the Knüll.

=== Natural regions ===
The Seulingswald forms an eponymous natural region (no. 357.20) within sub-unit Solztrotten and Seulingswald (357) which in turn is part of the major unit of the Fulda-Werra Uplands (no. 35), which is part of the major unit group of the East Hesse Highlands (no. 35). Its east-northeastern ridges fall within the major unit of the Salzungen Werra Upland (359), and the subunit of the Salzungen-Herleshausen Werra Valley (359.1) and the natural region of the Berka Basin (359.12).

=== Hills ===
The hills of the Seulingswald include the following – sorted by height in metres (m) above sea level (NHN):

Spoil tip:

- Monte Kali (530 m), Hersfeld-Rotenburg

Hills and high points:

- Toter Mann (480.3 m), Hersfeld-Rotenburg
- Gnishecke (470.8 m), Hersfeld-Rotenburg
- Stangenrück (465.7 m), Hersfeld-Rotenburg
- Schwalbenkopf (454.7 m), Hersfeld-Rotenburg
- Siebertsberg (449.1 m), Hersfeld-Rotenburg
- Hornungskuppe (444.1 m), Hersfeld-Rotenburg/Wartburgkreis
- Hermesberg (444.7 m), Hersfeld-Rotenburg/Wartburgkreis
- Kornberg (435.1 m), Hersfeld-Rotenburg
- Roteberg (434.4 m), Hersfeld-Rotenburg
- Plessenberg (402 m), Hersfeld-Rotenburg
- Wackenbühl (419.0 m), Hersfeld-Rotenburg
- Kimmenberg (416.4 m), Hersfeld-Rotenburg
- Kirchenkopf (398.6 m), Hersfeld-Rotenburg
- Waltersberg (388 m), Hersfeld-Rotenburg
- Schwarzenberg (381.8 m), Hersfeld-Rotenburg
- Großer Steinkopf (375.4 m), Hersfeld-Rotenburg
- Höneberg (354.7 m), Hersfeld-Rotenburg
- Heiligenberg (Seulingswald) (317.3 m), Hersfeld-Rotenburg/Wartburgkreis
- Hoher Berg (314.7 m), Hersfeld-Rotenburg
- Burbachsrück (340.5 m), Hersfeld-Rotenburg
- Gellenberg (340.4 m), Hersfeld-Rotenburg
- Wolfberg (334.7 m), Hersfeld-Rotenburg
- Hagelsberg (326.9 m), Hersfeld-Rotenburg
- Auf'm Berg (324.6 m), Hersfeld-Rotenburg
- Spießberg (300.5 m), Hersfeld-Rotenburg
- Obersberg (299.6 m), Hersfeld-Rotenburg
- Lerchenberg (Seulingswald) (287.5 m), Wartburgkreis
- Schottenberg (271.1 m), Hersfeld-Rotenburg

== Protected areas ==
In the central area and extended to the west-northwest of the Seulingswald is the protected landscape of Seulingswald (CDDA-No. 378688; designated in 1979; 30,2656 km²). In large parts of the forested areas is the Seulingswald Special Area of Conservation (FFH No. 378688; 23.2315 km²). Near the Ulfe is the natural woodland reserve of Goldbachs- und Ziebachsrück which has an area of 31 ha.

== History ==
On 27 September 1944 there was a major air battle over the Seulingswald between the US Air Force and the Luftwaffe, known as the Kassel Mission, which saw extremely high losses.

== Transport and hiking ==
The Seulingswald is crossed by the A4 motorway roughly in a northeast-southwest direction. At the junction of Bad Hersfeld it passes over the B27 federal highway which runs from the west of the region northwards towards Bebra. There the Landesstraße 3251 branches of the B 27 and passes north of the Seulingswald heading east through Ronshausen to Hönebach on the Thuringian state border. The E6 European long distance path runs between Hönebach and Friedewald, in places running parallel to the motorway.

== See also ==
- List of mountains and hills of Hesse
