= Herfabach =

River in Germany

Location
- Country: Germany
- State: Hesse
- District: Hersfeld-Rotenburg

Physical characteristics
- Source
  - location: Friedewald, Hesse
  - coordinates: 50°53′3″N 9°52′10″E
- Mouth
  - location: Wölfershausen
  - coordinates: 50°52′25″N 9°59′38″E
- Length: 11.3 km (7.0 mi)
- Basin size: 39.9 km^{2} (15.4 sq mi)

Basin features
- Progression: Werra→ Weser→ North Sea
- River system: Weser
- Tributaries
  - left: Eitzeröder water

Herfabach is a river located in Hersfeld-Rotenburg, Hesse, Germany. 11.3 kilometres (7.0 mi) in length, it is a west tributary of the Werra. It has a river basin area of 40.011 km ².

== See also ==
- List of rivers of Hesse
