= Bebra (disambiguation) =

Bebra is a small town in Hersfeld-Rotenburg district in northeastern Hesse, Germany.

Bebra may also refer to:

- Bebra station, the railway station of the northeastern Hesse town
- Bebra (Sondershausen), a part of the town Sondershausen in Thuringia, Germany
- Bebra (Fulda), a river of Hesse, Germany, tributary of the Fulda
