= Hornungskuppe =

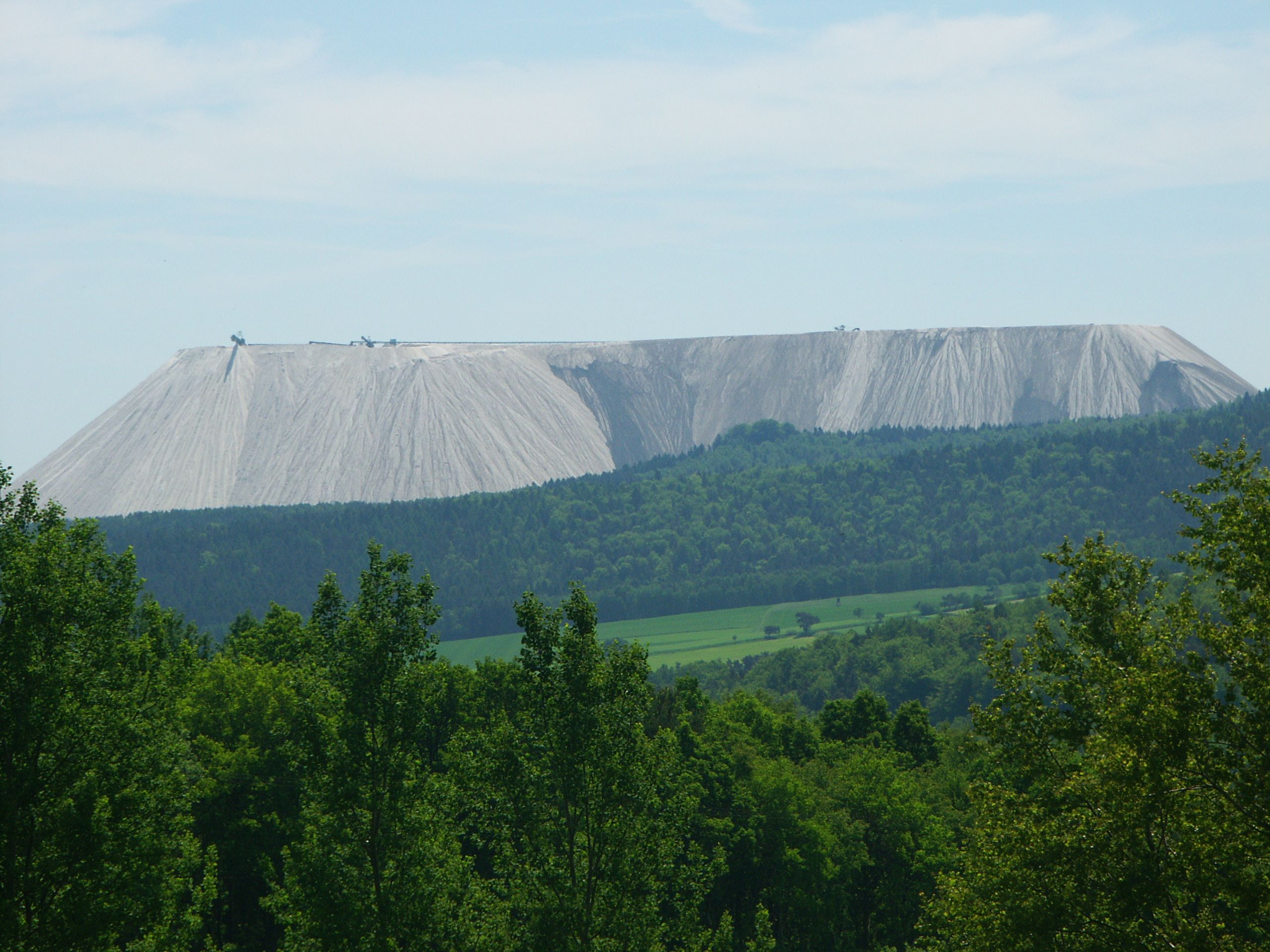
- The Hornungskuppe and Monte Kali

Highest point
- Elevation: 439 m above sea level (NHN) (1,440.3 ft)
- Coordinates: 50°54′18″N 9°58′43″E

Geography
- Location within Hesse
- Location: near Widdershausen and Dankmarshausen; Hesse and Thuringia, Germany
- Parent range: Seulingswald

Geology
- Rock type: Bunter Sandstone

The Hornungskuppe (called the Hornsberg in the Middle Ages) is a wooded hill, 439 m above sea level (NHN), in the Thuringian Zipfel on the border of Hesse and Thuringia in Germany. It is part of the natural region of the Seulingswald.

The Hornsberg was mentioned in documents dating to the 12th century in connexion with the eponymous noble family. It belongs to the parish of Widdershausen in the borough of Heringen in the Hessian county of Hersfeld-Rotenburg and the parish of Dankmarshausen in Thuringian Wartburgkreis. The border between the two German states runs over the hill.

The Hornungskuppe is (still) used for forestry. The fenced in terrain on which the spoil tip of Monte Kali stands begins on its western slopes. Barely 500 metres to the northeast on a spur of the Hornungskuppe stands Hornsberg Castle.
