= Ronshausen =

- Municipality
- Coat of arms

- Location of Ronshausen within Hersfeld-Rotenburg district
- Interactive map of Ronshausen
- Location within Germany Location within Hesse
- Coordinates: 50°57′N 09°51′E
- Country: Germany
- State: Hesse
- Admin. region: Kassel
- District: Hersfeld-Rotenburg

Government
  - Mayor (2023–29): Markus Becker (CDU)

Area
  - Total: 37.65 km^{2} (14.54 sq mi)
- Elevation: 234–469 m (768–1,539 ft)

Population (2025-12-31)
  - Total: 2,257
  - Density: 59.95/km^{2} (155.3/sq mi)
- Time zone: UTC+01:00 (CET)
  - Summer (DST): UTC+02:00 (CEST)
- Postal codes: 36217
- Dialling codes: 06622
- Vehicle registration: HEF
- Website: www.ronshausen.de

Ronshausen is a municipality and a Luftkurort (“air spa”) in the Hersfeld-Rotenburg district in northeastern Hesse, Germany.

== Geography ==
=== Location ===
The community lies in the valley of the Ulfe, which in Bebra empties into the Fulda. It lies in the Seulingswald and the Richelsdorf Hills (ranges).

The nearest major towns are Bad Hersfeld (some 15 km to the southwest), Rotenburg (some 12 km to the northwest) and Eisenach (some 35 km to the east).

=== Neighbouring communities ===
Ronshausen borders in the northwest on the town of Bebra (outlying centre of Weiterode), in the northeast on the community of Nentershausen, in the east on the community of Wildeck, in the south Friedewald and in the west on the community of Ludwigsau (all in Hersfeld-Rotenburg).

=== Constituent communities ===
Ronshausen has only one outlying Ortsteil, Machtlos.

== History ==
In 1061, Ronshausen had its first documentary mention as Runteshuson in a donation document to the Fulda Abbey. The outlying centre of Machtlos had its first documentary mention as villa Mechtolves in 1329. The name Mechtolves (gen.) meant “of the mighty wolf”

From 1359, a toll station was set up at Ronshausen, which exacted road tolls for the Ulfestraße (road) until 1834. As early as 1386, Ronshausen belonged to the Landgraves of Hesse.

In the Thirty Years' War from 1618 to 1648 and the Seven Years' War from 1756 to 1763, the community was abandoned several times, but already by 1780, there was a mention of Ronshausen as a big village of 468 inhabitants.

Until the mid 19th century, the community was characterized by agricultural pursuits. Only when the Bebra-Eisenach railway was built did this change. Tourism has played a rôle since the mid 20th century.

The community of Machtlos was amalgamated with Ronshausen in 1972 as part of municipal reform.

== Politics ==
=== Community council ===
The municipal election held on 26 March 2006 yielded the following results:

Parties and voter communities		% 2006	Seats; 2006	% 2001	Seats; 2001
CDU	Christian Democratic Union of Germany	19.3	3	20.1	3
SPD	Social Democratic Party of Germany	55.2	8	57.6	9
FDP	Free Democratic Party	9.7	2	–	–
FWG	Freie Wählergemeinschaft Ronshausen	15.8	2	22.3	3
Total		100.0	15	100.0	15
Voter turnout in %		62.2		72.2	

The community's executive (Gemeindevorstand) is made up of five members, with four seats allotted to the SPD and one to the CDU.

=== Mayor ===
Mayor Friedhold Zilch (SPD) was once again elected on 30 October 2005 with 62.7% of the vote.

=== Town partnerships ===
- Genas, Rhône, France since 1976
- (Germany) Frauensee, Thuringia since 1990

== Culture and sightseeing ==
=== Buildings ===
- 800-year-old fortress church with rustic Baroque paintings

=== Culinary specialities ===
At a local butcher shop is made a local speciality called the Januar-Stracke, a kind of aged pork sausage.

== Economy and infrastructure ==
=== Transport ===
Ronshausen has a railway station on the Thüringer Bahn from Eisenach to Bebra.
