= Toter Mann =

Toter Mann (German for "dead man") may refer to:

- a German mining expression for an unproductive mineral vein (Mann)
- Erdanker Toter Mann, a fixing technology in firn and snow
- Toter Mann, German for the ball of coke that forms in the centre of a blast furnace
- Toter Mann, German for "back floating" a form of survival when swimming

== Places ==
- Toter Mann (Warscheneck Group) (2,137 m), subpeak of the Warscheneck on the Pyhrn Pass in Upper Austria
- Toter Mann (Berchtesgaden Alps) (1,392 m), mountain near Berchtesgaden, Bavaria
- Toter Mann (Black Forest) (1,321 m), mountain in the municipality of Oberried im Breisgau, well known mountain run
- Toter Mann (Kolomansberg), 874 m, mountain with Bildbaum am Kolomansberg, Salzburg state
- Toter Mann (Seulingswald), 480 m, hill near Friedewald, Hessen
- Le Mort Homme, a fiercely fought-over hill in the Battle of Verdun

== Other uses ==
- Toter Mann (film), 2001 German TV thriller by Christian Petzold
- a 1989 crime story by Yaak Karsunke

== See also ==
- Todtmann, Todter Mann
- Dead man (disambiguation)
