= Bebra =

- Town
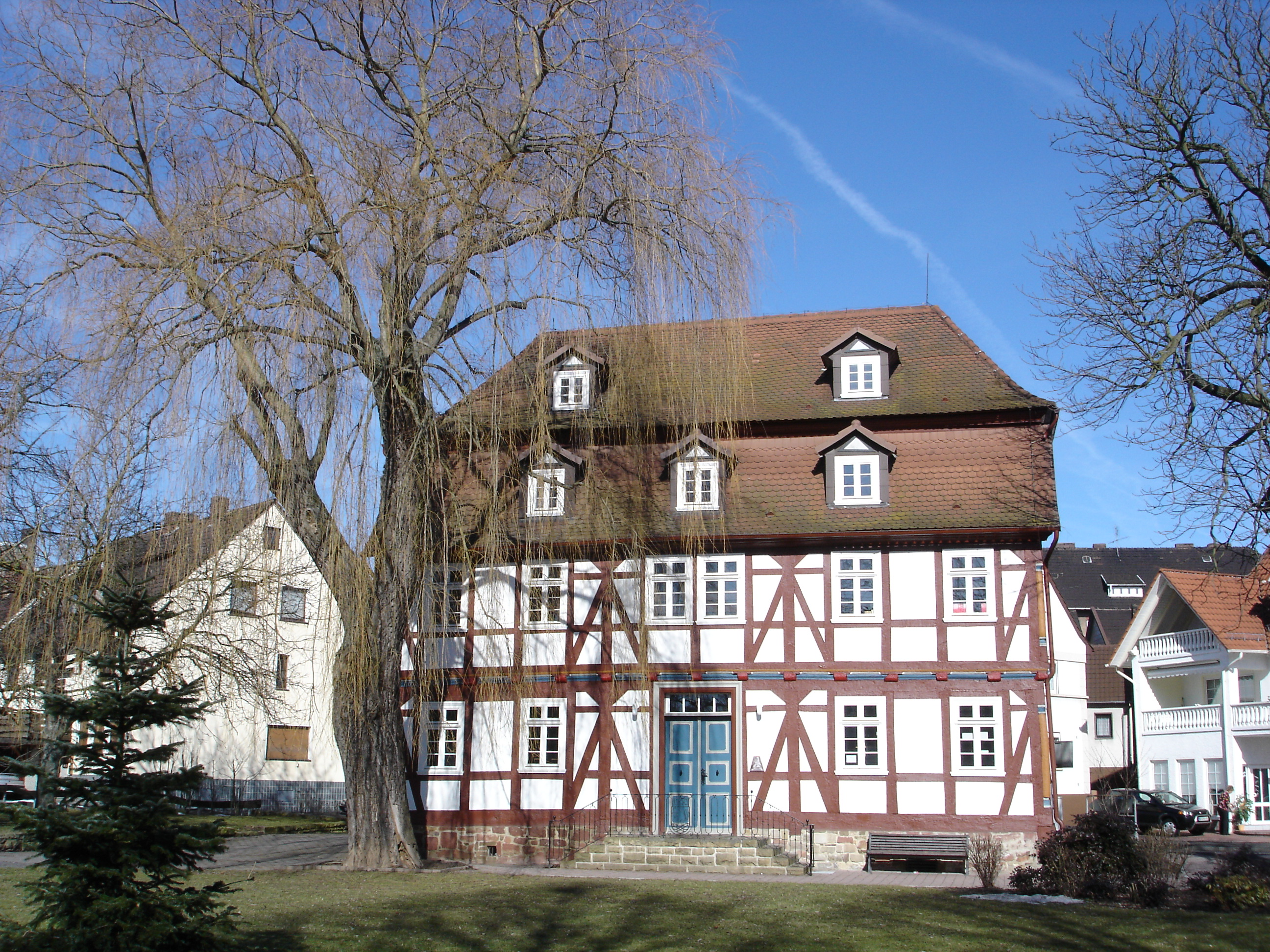
- Old town hall

- Coat of arms

- Location of Bebra within Hersfeld-Rotenburg district
- Interactive map of Bebra
- Location within Germany Location within Hesse
- Coordinates: 50°58′16″N 9°47′25″E
- Country: Germany
- State: Hesse
- Admin. region: Kassel
- District: Hersfeld-Rotenburg

Government
  - Mayor (2019–25): Stefan Knoche

Area
  - Total: 93.63 km^{2} (36.15 sq mi)
- Elevation: 195 m (640 ft)

Population (2025-12-31)
  - Total: 12,917
  - Density: 138.0/km^{2} (357.3/sq mi)
- Time zone: UTC+01:00 (CET)
  - Summer (DST): UTC+02:00 (CEST)
- Postal codes: 36179
- Dialling codes: 06622
- Vehicle registration: HEF
- Website: www.bebra.de

Bebra (German pronunciation: [ˈbeːbʁaː]) is a small town in Hersfeld-Rotenburg district in northeastern Hesse, Germany.

== Geography ==
=== Location ===
Bebra lies some 45 km (28 mi) south of Kassel on the Fulda. The town is easy to find on most maps thanks to its prominent location on the Fuldaknie ("Fulda Knee"). Ranges surrounding the town are the Stölzinger Gebirge (range) in the north, the Richelsdorf Hills in the east, the Seulingswald in the southeast and the Knüllin the southwest. The biggest neighbouring places are Rotenburg and Bad Hersfeld. Frankfurt is about 150 km (93 mi) southwest of Bebra.

Within Bebra's town limits, the Bebra, Solz, Lüder and Ulfe empty into the Fulda, while the Iba empties into the Ulfe.

=== Neighbouring communities ===
Clockwise from the north, these are Cornberg, Nentershausen, Ronshausen, Ludwigsau and Rotenburg.

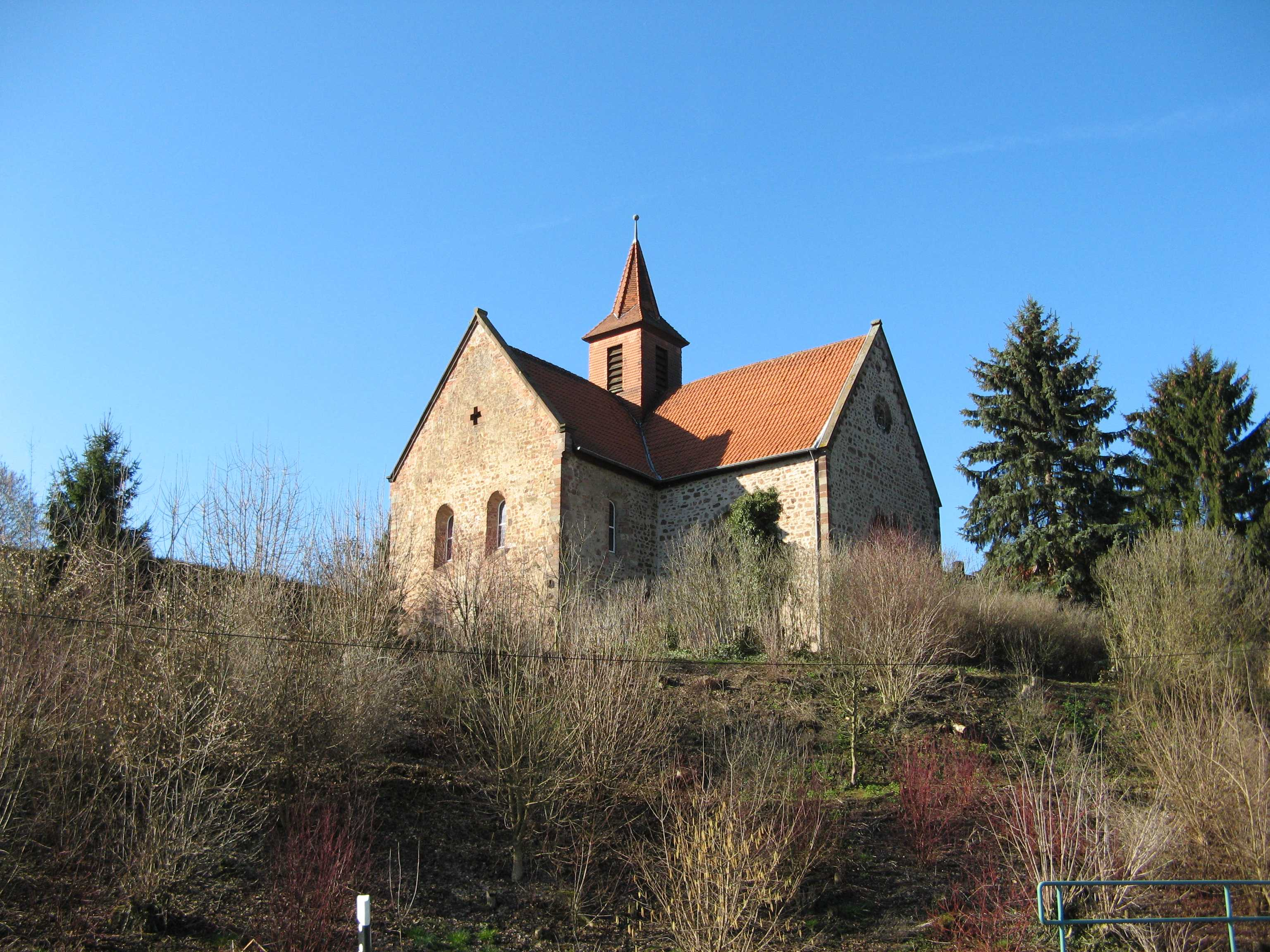
Chapel near Blankenheim

=== Constituent communities ===
Bebra's 11 Stadtteile are, in alphabetical order, Asmushausen, Blankenheim, Braunhausen, Breitenbach, Gilfershausen, Iba, Imshausen, Lüdersdorf, Rautenhausen, Solz and Weiterode. Imshausen and Solz are the Trott zu Solz family's seat.

== History ==
The name Bebra came from Biberaho (“Village on the Beaver River”; Biber still means “beaver” in German today). Later this became first Bibera, and then today's name Bebra.

In 786, the town had its first documentary mention in an estate directory of the Hersfeld Abbey, which is confirmed as having been built in 769. The reason for the mention was that Bebra was donated to the Abbey to cover food demands, thus leading to the conclusion that the directory itself, and thereby Bebra's existence as well, go back a few years further than that.

For the next several centuries the settlement was mainly a big farming village, even though important, heavily used roads already met at this spot quite early on. For one, there was the road to the east leading by way of Eisenach to Halle. For another, there was the postal road running along the Fulda valley linking the region with southern Germany. Nevertheless, at that time the area was dominated by Rotenburg, lying 6 km (4 mi) away, which enjoyed status as a small residence town.

An upswing came Bebra's way when the railway network in Germany was expanded, reaching even this region by the mid 19th century. Towards the end of the century, the town was one of Germany's most important railway junctions. On the one hand, the town's population thereby grew over about 70 years from some 1,300 to 5,063 by 1946. On the other hand, the town lost its formerly exclusively rural character with trade and businesses settling in town, among which the old Deutsche Reichsbahn was the biggest employer. Town rights were granted Bebra on 20 September 1935 by the Chief President (Oberpräsident) of the Province of Hesse-Nassau, Philipp, Prince of Hesse.

The town's growth kept up – interrupted only by the Second World War – into the 1970s. Given the good transport connections, a large industrial area arose in town. During the time of the division of Germany, there was a border checkpoint in Bebra to handle both people and goods crossing between the postwar occupational zones and, later, between West and East Germany. Before the fall of the Berlin Wall, Bebra was the largest border checkpoint for rail transportation across East German territory between West Germany and Berlin.

As of the mid-1980s, Bebra was gradually losing importance as a railway junction, which led to a noticeable decline in goods traffic and thereby to fewer jobs at Deutsche Bahn.

=== Religion ===
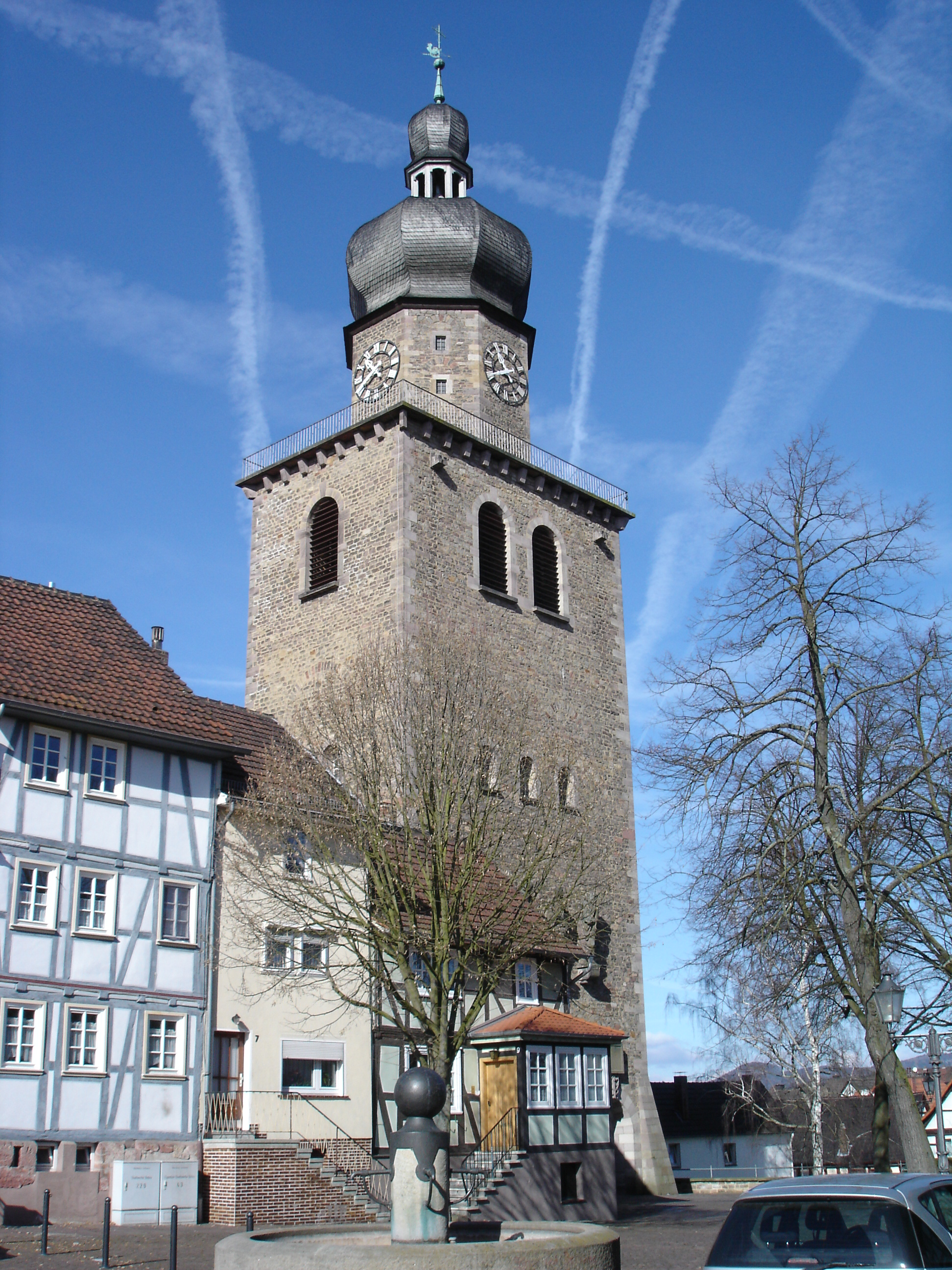
Evangelical church

In Bebra's main town and its outlying centres stand 12 Evangelical churches, one Catholic church, one Evangelical Methodist church and one Syriac Orthodox church, with Free Evangelical and State Church communities represented in town.

=== Amalgamations ===
All constituent communities named above were amalgamated with municipal reform in 1972.

=== Population development ===
Year	1821	1830	1849	1858	1880	1900	1925	1939	1946	1965	1968
Inhabitants	987	1,066	1,488	1,164	1,369	2,037	2,740	4,830	6,985	7,780	7,912
Year	1971	1972 ¹	1975	1977	1982	1988	1999	2002			
Inhabitants	8,155	15,614	15,740	15,583	16,638	16,485	15,799	15,105			

(¹ after amalgamation of 11 outlying centres)

== Politics ==
=== Town council ===
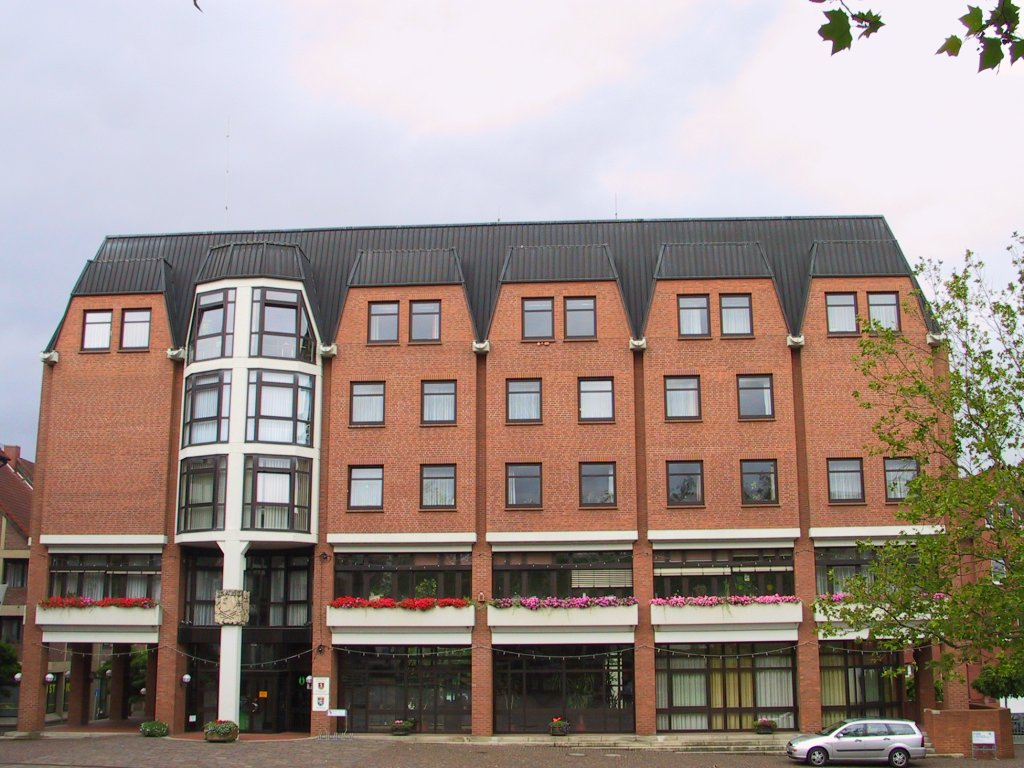
Bebra's New Town Hall

The municipal election held on 26 March 2006 yielded the following results:

Parties and voter communities		% 2006	Seats; 2006	% 2001	Seats; 2001
CDU	Christian Democratic Union of Germany	49.0	18	53.8	20
SPD	Social Democratic Party of Germany	38.3	14	41.0	15
FWG	Freie Wählergemeinschaft Bebra	3.5	1	5.2	2
Gemeinsam	Gemeinsam für Bebra	9.2	4	–	–
Total		100.0	37	100.0	37
Voter turnout in %		52.0		59.1	

The town executive (Magistrat) is made up of 8 councillors, with 5 seats allotted to the CDU and three to the SPD.

=== Mayor ===
- 1995–2013: Horst Groß (CDU)
- 2013–2019: Uwe Hassl
- 2019–incumbent: Stefan Knoche

=== Coat of arms ===
The town's arms might be described thus: Gules a beaver rampant, in the base two bendlets, thereover two bendlets sinister, the whole argent.

Bebra's arms symbolize the town's change from a village to an important railway junction. The tinctures recall the Hersfeld Abbey’s coat of arms, Bebra having belonged to the Abbey’s oldest holding. The crossed bendlets (thin diagonal bars, and more aptly described as such than as “a saltire voided”, given the way they are meant to be shown) are an heraldic way of representing a railway junction, which was the town's main function when the arms were conferred in 1930, and had been since the middle of the foregoing century.

=== Town partnerships ===
- (Germany) Friedrichroda, Thuringia since the early 1990s
- Knaresborough, North Yorkshire, England, United Kingdom since 1970

== Culture and sightseeing ==
=== Museums ===
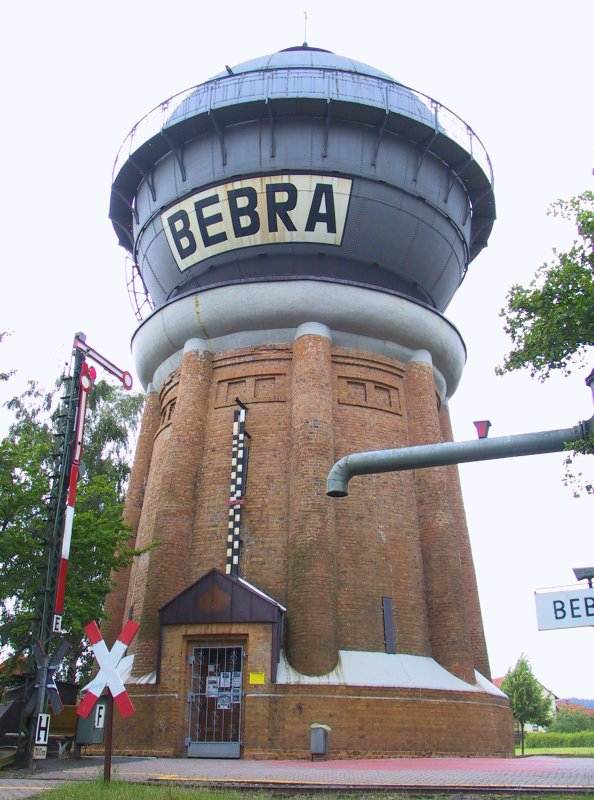
Watertower

The railway museum in the historic watertower shows the railway history that was so important to Bebra. Right next door is found a 600 mm (1 ft 11 5/8 in) narrow-gauge railway that runs on some days from April to September. The toy museum in the outlying centre of Solz offers a glimpse of toys from almost forgotten times.

=== Buildings ===
Besides the old town hall, various timber-frame houses, the town's parks and the Friedrichshütte are worthy of mention. There are a Catholic and an Evangelical church as well, the latter of which was thoroughly restored after the Second World War.

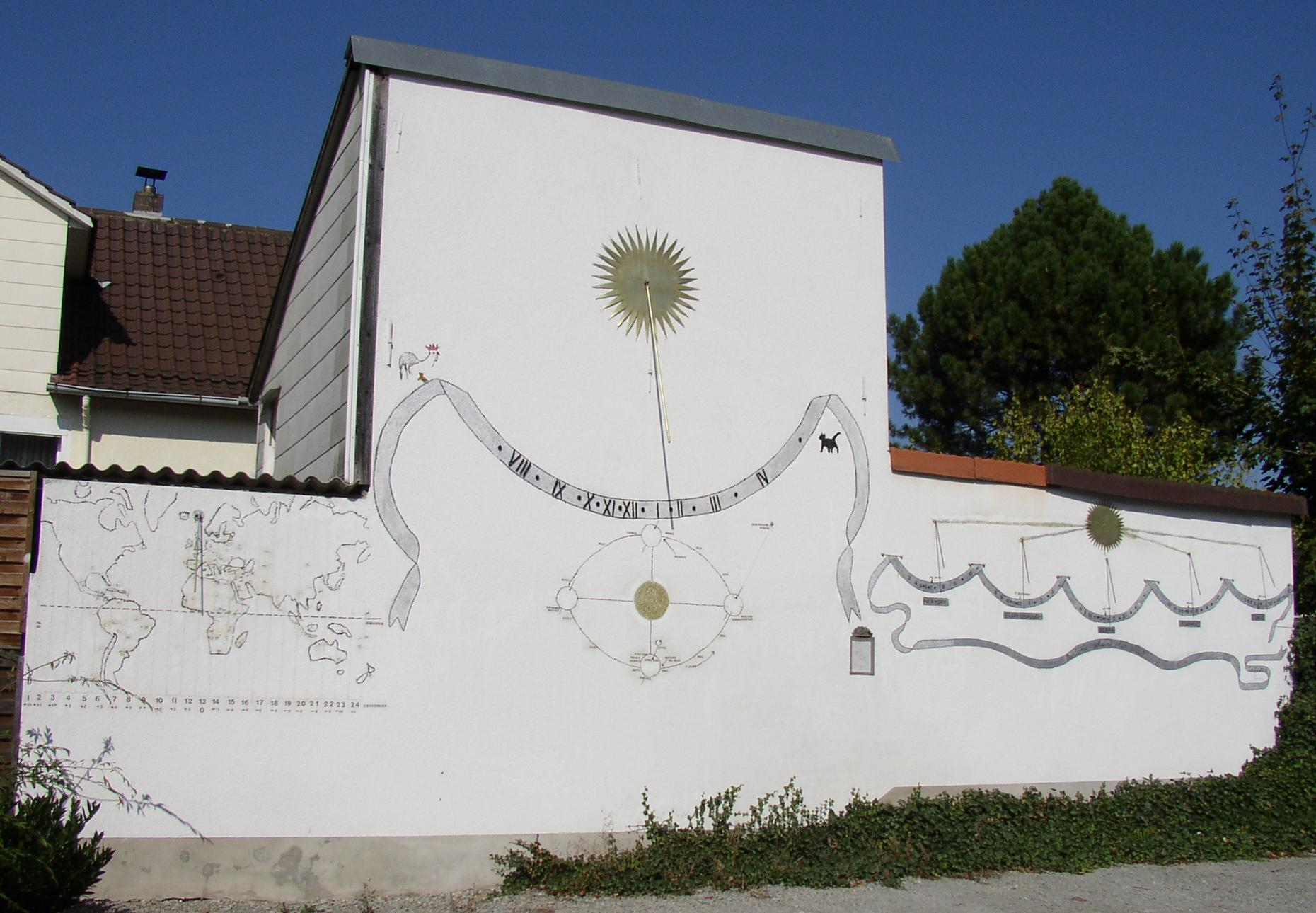
Sundials

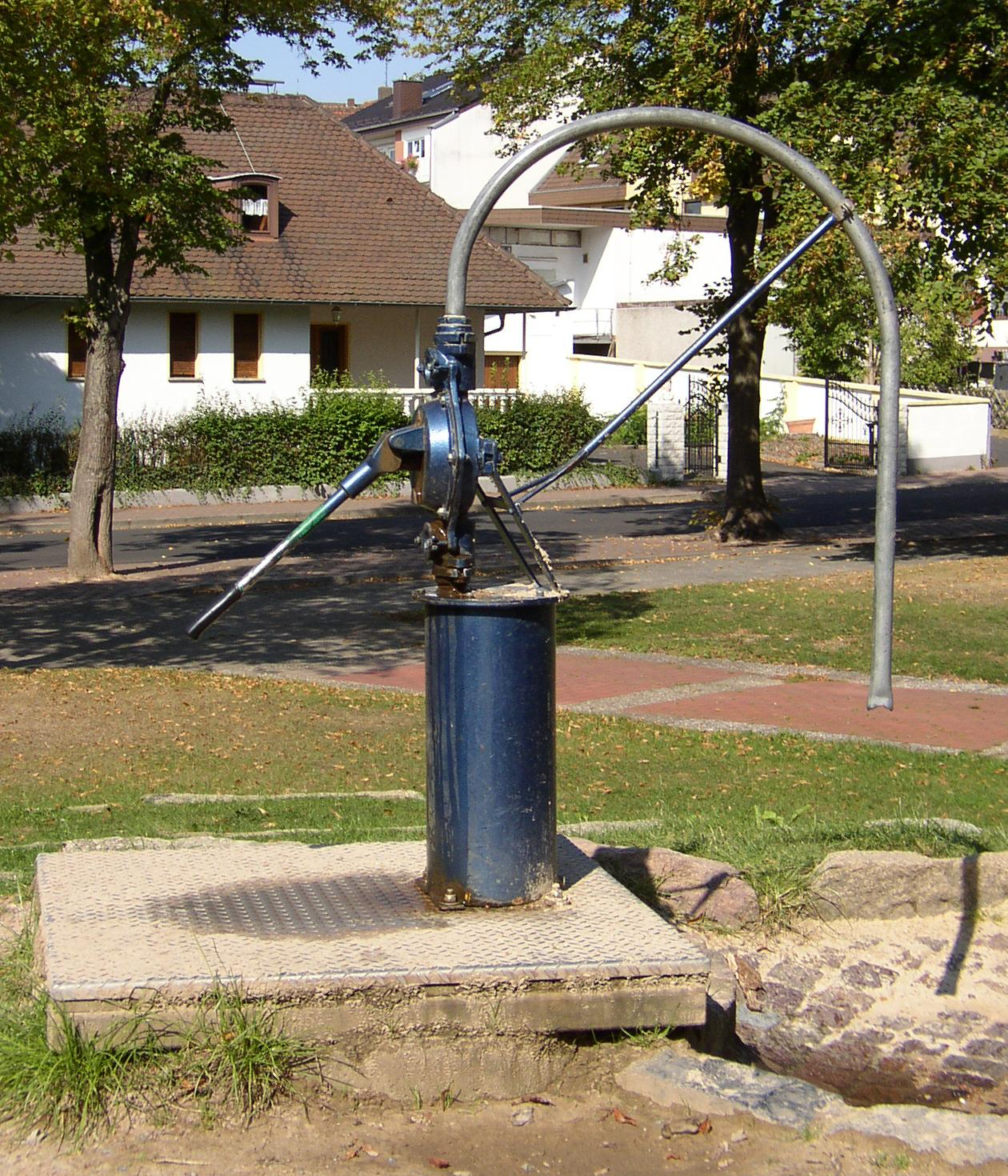
Reciprocating waterpump

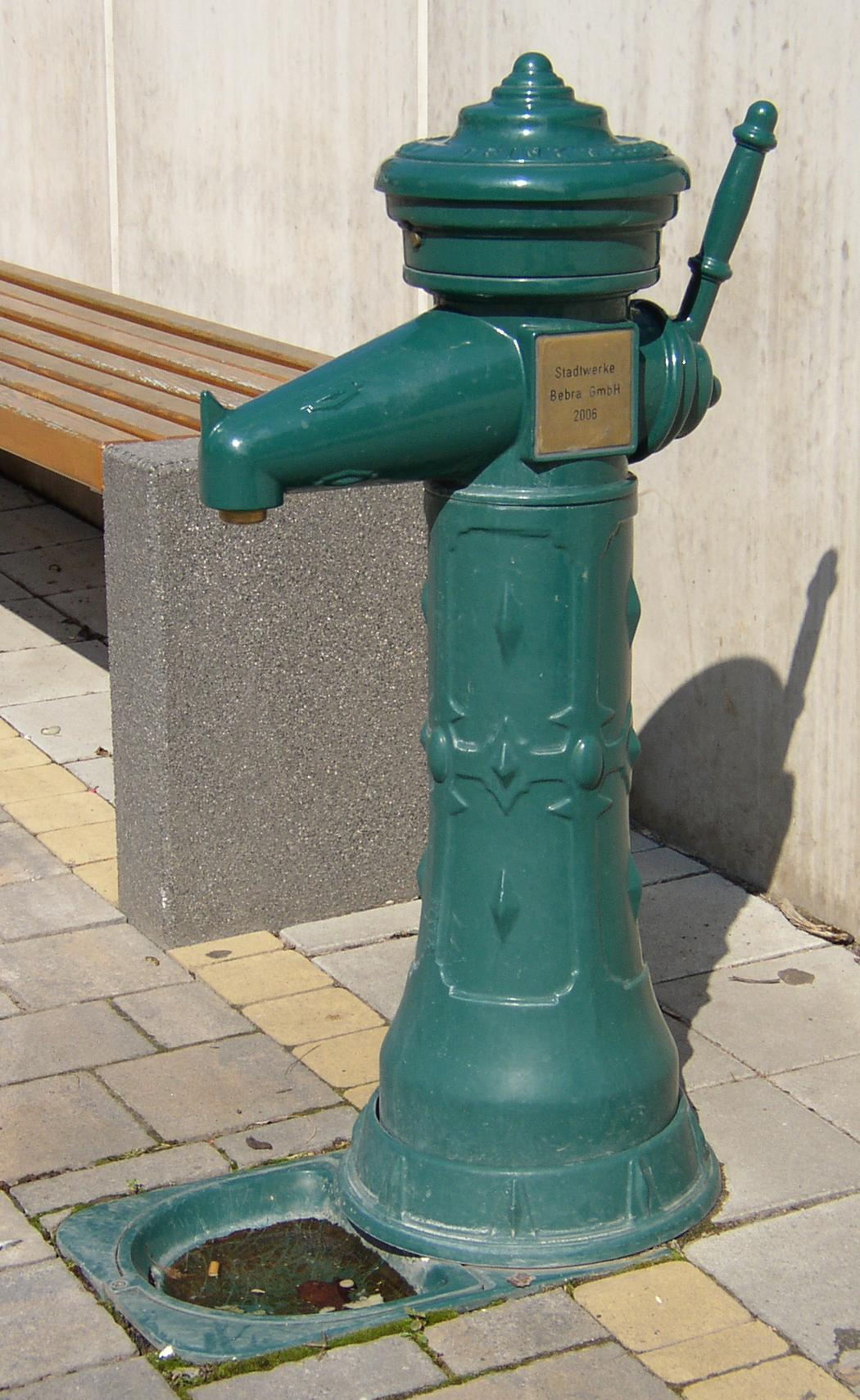
watertap

=== Regular events ===
Early in the year there is an Easter Market, and in autumn there is a harvest and homeland festival. A Christmas Market is held not long before Christmas. Besides the town festival (Stadtfest), a fishermen's festival (Fischerfest) and a kite festival (Drachenfest) are held in the summer. Every other year there is also a trade show.

== Economy and infrastructure ==
In the late 1980s, Bebra was losing its importance as a railway junction as German reunification loomed and the town lost cross-border traffic. This led to widespread job loss among the inhabitants, as the railway had long been the town's biggest employer. An anecdote in Bebra has it that in the years after the war, people did not ask “Where do you work?” but rather “Where on the railway do you work?”.

From the turn of the millennium, local politicians and Members of the Bundestag from the Hersfeld-Rotenburg district strove to have Bebra's railway station expanded into a marshalling yard.

=== Transport ===
Bebra is a classic railway town at a junction of the Bebra–Fulda, Bebra–Göttingen, Thuringian and Bebra–Kassel lines. Its station, besides a passenger station, includes a marshalling yard, making reaching the town by rail problem-free. The town belongs to the Nordhessischer Verkehrsverbund (“North Hesse Transport Association”, NVV). As a stop on the InterCityExpress east–west line, it has connections to the Ruhr area, Leipzig, Dresden and Berlin.

In the west of town, Bundesstraße 27 from the north and south meets Bundesstraße 83 coming from the west. The B 27 runs beyond town southwards reaching the A 4 (Aachen–Görlitz) and A 7 (Flensburg–Füssen) near Bad Hersfeld after some 15 km (9 mi). Bebra can also be reached from the east over the L 3251 state road.

=== Established businesses ===
- Siemens VDO Automotive AG
- Plustec

== Sons and daughters of the town ==
- August Vilmar (1800–1868), theologian, professor, Staatsrat (“State Councillor”) and literary historian
- August von Trott zu Solz (1855–1938), politician, 1909–1917 education minister, cofounder of the Kaiser Wilhelm Institute

== People connected to Bebra ==
- Otmar Freiherr von Verschuer (1896–1969), physician, human geneticist, twin researcher and leading eugenicist in the Third Reich.
- Adam von Trott zu Solz (1909–1944), jurist, diplomat and resistance fighter against Nazism.
- Annika Becker (born 1981), pole vaulter
- Shkodran Mustafi (born 1992), professional football player and world champion in 2014

== Twin towns – sister cities ==
Bebra is twinned with:

- Vrútky in Slovakia
- Knaresborough in the United Kingdom
