= Alheim =

- Municipality
- Coat of arms

- Location of Alheim within Hersfeld-Rotenburg district
- Interactive map of Alheim
- Location within Germany Location within Hesse
- Coordinates: 51°2′54″N 09°40′1″E
- Country: Germany
- State: Hesse
- Admin. region: Kassel
- District: Hersfeld-Rotenburg
- Subdivisions: 10 districts

Government
  - Mayor (2023–29): Andreas Brethauer (SPD)

Area
  - Total: 63.83 km^{2} (24.64 sq mi)
- Elevation: 190 m (620 ft)

Population (2025-12-31)
  - Total: 4,803
  - Density: 75.25/km^{2} (194.9/sq mi)
- Time zone: UTC+01:00 (CET)
  - Summer (DST): UTC+02:00 (CEST)
- Postal codes: 36211
- Dialling codes: 06623, 05664 (Heinebach)
- Vehicle registration: HEF
- Website: www.alheim.de

Alheim is a municipality in Hersfeld-Rotenburg district in northeastern Hesse, Germany. It is named after nearby Alheimer Mountain. Alheim consist of 10 former souverain villages situated on both banks of the river Fulda.

== Geography ==
=== Location ===
The community lies in Hersfeld-Rotenburg district some 35 km southeast of Kassel and a few kilometres northwest of Rotenburg an der Fulda. It stretches along both banks of the Fulda into the Knüllgebirge (range) and the Stölzinger Gebirge. In this latter range the community’s landmark can be found, the 549 m-high Alheimer.

=== Constituent communities ===
Alheim’s Ortsteile are Baumbach (founded before 1003), Erdpenhausen, Hergershausen, Licherode, Niederellenbach, Niedergude (founded before 960), Oberellenbach, Obergude (founded before 960), Sterkelshausen (founded before 1003) and Heinebach.

As of 2022, the municipality's population was 4959 people.

=== Neighbouring communities ===
Alheim borders in the north on the community of Morschen and the town of Spangenberg (both in the Schwalm-Eder-Kreis), in the east on the town of Rotenburg an der Fulda, in the south on the community of Ludwigsau (both in Hersfeld-Rotenburg) and in the west on the community of Knüllwald (in the Schwalm-Eder-Kreis).

== Politics ==
=== Community council ===
The municipal election held on 14 March 2021 yielded the following results:

- Social Democratic Party of Germany 10 seats
- Christian Democratic Union of Germany 8 seats
- Free Democratic Party 3 seats
- Alliance 90/The Greens 2 seats

=== Mayor ===
At the last mayoral elections held on 12 March 2023, Andreas Brethauer (SPD) was elected.

=== Town partnerships ===
- Zandhoven, Antwerp province, Belgium since 2001

The partnership actually began in 1971 when one came into being between Heinebach, now Alheim’s biggest centre, and Pulle, which has since become part of Zandhoven.

== Municipal area’s development ==
=== Establishment ===
Within the framework of municipal reform, the villages named above were merged into the new community of Alheim on 1 August 1972.

== Culture and sightseeing ==
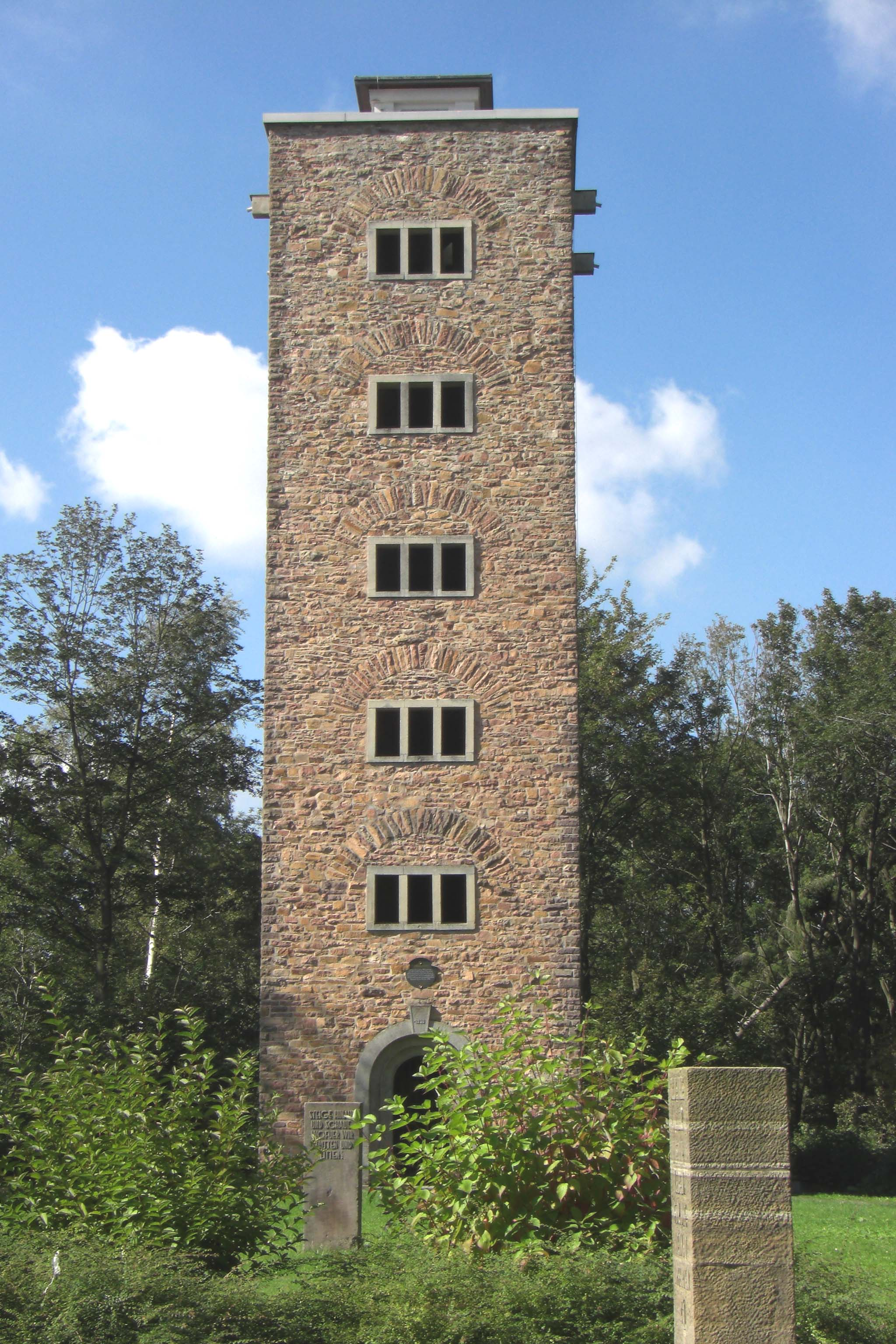
Alheimer-Turm

Walking loops, each based on a theme, have been built. Foremost among these are the mining history learning and adventure path (Bergbauhistorischer Lern- und Erlebnispfad), the water adventure path (Wassererlebnispfad) and the cultural history hiking loop (kulturhistorischer Rundwanderweg)

A popular outing or hiking destination is the Alheimer-Turm (tower) on the like-named mountain in the Stölzinger Gebirge.

=== Buildings ===
- The churches in some of the community’s centres have been preserved with their mediaeval defensive walls.
- On the Heineberg, remains of a wall are preserved stemming from fortifications built in the 8th or 10th century. During digs in 1974, an early mediaeval church’s foundation was unearthed.

== Famous people ==
- Franz Christian Gundlach, fashion photographer and curator (b. 1926 in Heinebach)
- Manfred Siebald, Christian songwriter (b. 1948 in Baumbach)
