= Friedewald, Hesse =

Friedewald
- Municipality
- Coat of arms

- Location of Friedewald within Hersfeld-Rotenburg district
- Interactive map of Friedewald
- Location within Germany Location within Hesse
- Coordinates: 50°53′N 09°52′E
- Country: Germany
- State: Hesse
- Admin. region: Kassel
- District: Hersfeld-Rotenburg
- Subdivisions: 4 districts

Government
  - Mayor (2022–28): Julian Kempka (SPD)

Area
  - Total: 39.64 km^{2} (15.31 sq mi)
- Elevation: 388 m (1,273 ft)

Population (2025-12-31)
  - Total: 2,638
  - Density: 66.55/km^{2} (172.4/sq mi)
- Time zone: UTC+01:00 (CET)
  - Summer (DST): UTC+02:00 (CEST)
- Postal codes: 36289
- Dialling codes: 06674
- Vehicle registration: HEF
- Website: www.gemeinde-friedewald.de

Friedewald (German pronunciation: [ˈfʁiːdəvalt]) is a municipality in Hersfeld-Rotenburg district in eastern Hesse, Germany, directly east of Bad Hersfeld.

== Geography ==
=== Location ===
The community lies in the boundary zone between the Kuppen Rhön and Seulingswald ranges. Friedewald lies on the watershed between the Fulda and the Werra, and at the foot of the Dreienberg, which is among the northernmost outliers of the Rhön.

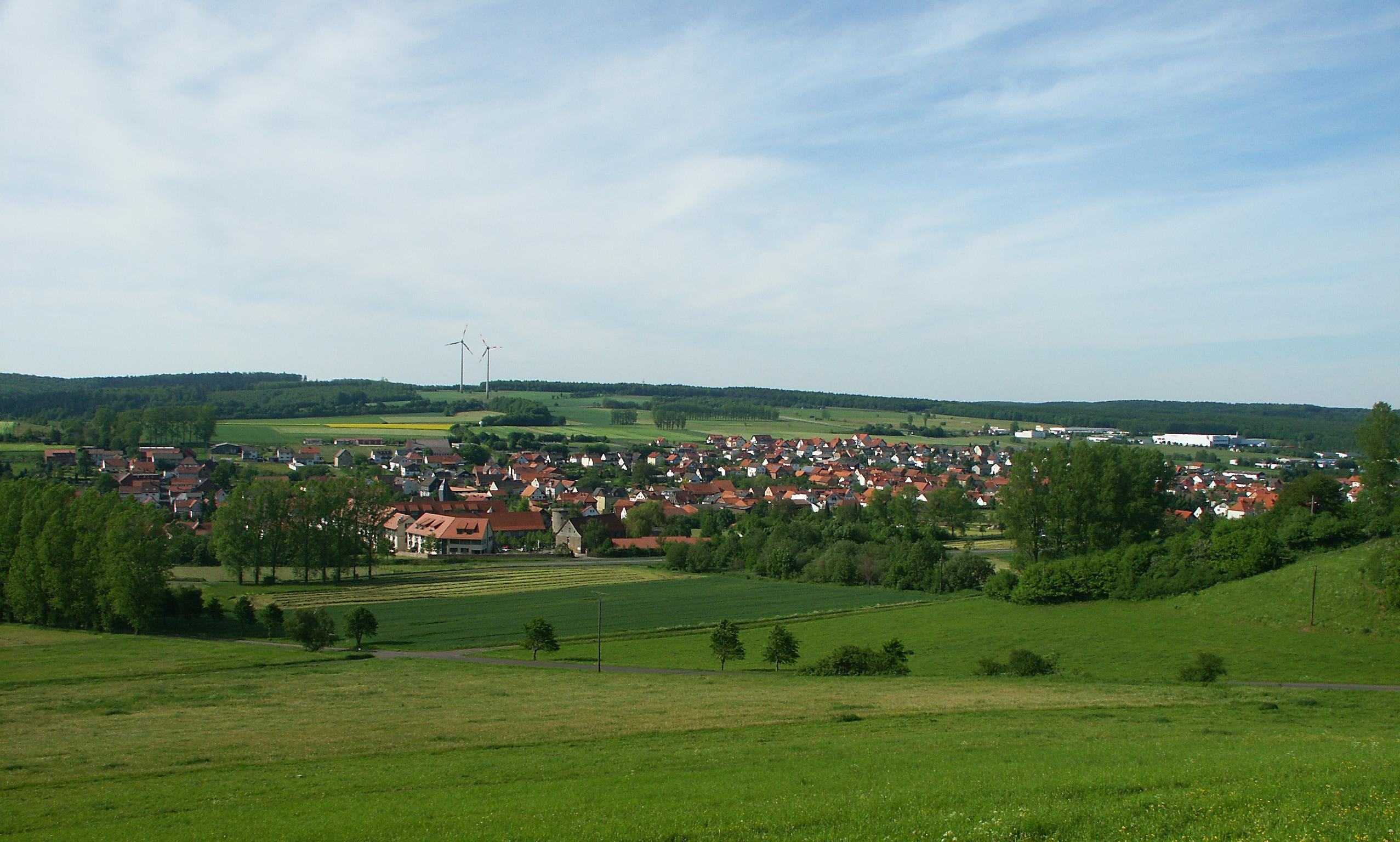
View over Friedewald from the slopes of the Dreienberg

=== Neighbouring communities ===
Friedewald borders in the north on the communities of Ronshausen and Wildeck, in the east on the town of Heringen and the community of Philippsthal, in the southeast on the community of Hohenroda, in the south on the community of Schenklengsfeld and in the west on the town of Bad Hersfeld and the community of Ludwigsau (all in Hersfeld-Rotenburg).

=== Constituent communities ===
Friedewald's Ortsteile, besides the main centre, also called Friedewald, are Lautenhausen, Hillartshausen and Motzfeld.

== History ==
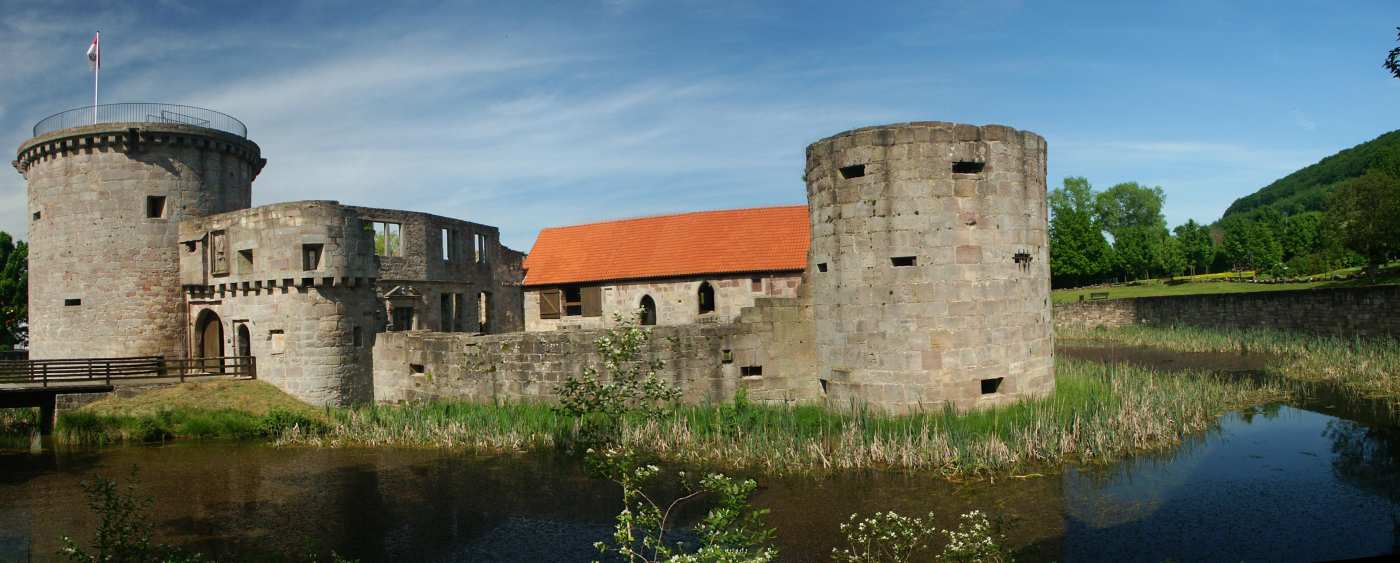
Panorama of the moated castle of Friedewald

The Amt of Friedewald (with market rights and jurisdiction) had its first documentary mention in 1392, as did the community itself in 1430. An abbot's castle stood here as early as 1312, which as a fief of the Hersfeld Abbey was given over to the Landgraves of Hesse. The castle is believed to have been built to watch over the trade road called Kurze Hessen, which ran from Frankfurt to Leipzig.

In 1472, this castle was torn down and Landgrave Heinrich III had a moated castle built here by his building master Hans Jakob von Ettlingen, which served the Landgraves during their hunting stays. Friedewald Castle with its four corner towers was destroyed in 1762. On 5 October 1551, the treaty between France and the Princes of Schmalkalden that provided for Landgrave Philipp I's freedom from his Imperial imprisonment was signed here. The castle is still the community's middle point and landmark.

== Politics ==
=== Community council ===
The municipal election held on 26 March 2006 yielded the following results:

Parties and voter communities		% 2006	Seats; 2006	% 2001	Seats; 2001
CDU	Christian Democratic Union of Germany	21.0	3	33.4	5
SPD	Social Democratic Party of Germany	59.4	9	46.7	7
OL	Offene Liste	19.5	3	–	–
BpF	Bürgerliste pro Friedewald e.V.	–	–	17.5	3
FDP	Free Democratic Party	–	–	2.4	0
Total		100.0	15	100.0	15
Voter turnout in %		58.4		74.1	

The community's executive (Gemeindevorstand) is made up of five members, with one seat allotted to the SPD, two to the CDU and 1 each to the Bürgerliste-pro-Friedewald and the independent mayor.

=== Mayor ===
The mayor Dirk Noll (SPD) was elected in October 2018.

=== Coat of arms ===
The community's arms might be described thus: Gules a wall and tower embattled argent therein a three-tiered fountain sable, the chief four oakleaves each with an acorn argent.

The German blazon refers to the wall and tower as a “castle silhouette with crenellations”.

== Economy and infrastructure ==
=== Transport ===
The community lies on Autobahn A 4 (Aachen–Görlitz), interchange 33. Furthermore, Bundesstraße 62 runs through the community from Bad Hersfeld to Bad Salzungen.

=== Established businesses ===
In early 2009, Hermes Logistik Gruppe will bring its newest main goods handling base into service, with an area of 100 000 m² and a building with 18 000 m².

Moreover, Schenker Deutschland AG runs such a facility, which is important to Schenker, especially for general cargo shipped within Germany.

== Culture and sightseeing ==
=== Museums ===
- Heimatmuseum Friedewald (local history) in the south stables at the castle bailey

=== Buildings ===
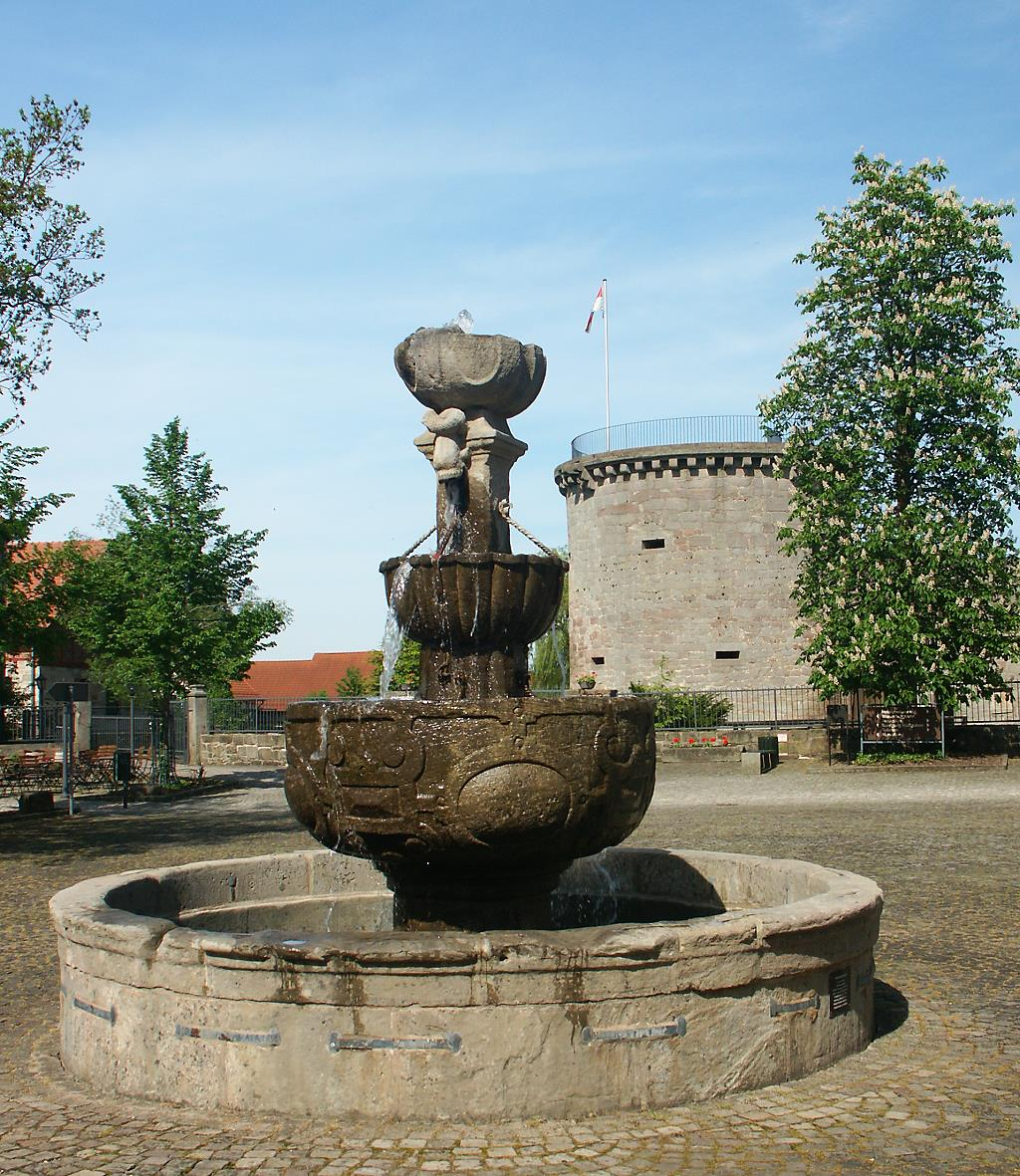
Three-tiered fountain in the bailey yard, in the background the Dicker Turm at the moated castle of Friedewald

- Ruins of the moated castle of Friedewald with four defensive towers built out of Friedewald sandstone of the Landgraves of Hesse from the 15th century, and the bailey from about 1600.
- In the middle of the castle square stands a Baroque three-tiered fountain
- Hammundeseiche, an abandoned village since 1312, where church walls, a village pond, the village well and the “Fat Oak” (an old village oaktree) can still be seen. The “Fat Oak”, known as the Dicke Eiche, the Hammundeseiche or the Nadelöhr in German, had its first documentary mention in 1579 in which it was described as a hollow oak. Crawling through it was believed to have healing powers. The fallen tree was replaced, presumably in the late 16th century, with a gatelike stone.
- Tower ruins of the Gisslingskirche (church)
- Ruins of the Walterskirche (church) in the abandoned village of Waldradeberg
- Ruins of a watchtower at the Dreienburg castle ruins

== Famous people ==
=== Sons and daughters of the town ===
- Karl Bernhard Hundeshagen (1810–1872), reformed theologian
- August Spies b. 10 December 1855; d. 11 November 1887 in Chicago, hanged journalist.
