= Monte Kali =

Mountain in Germany

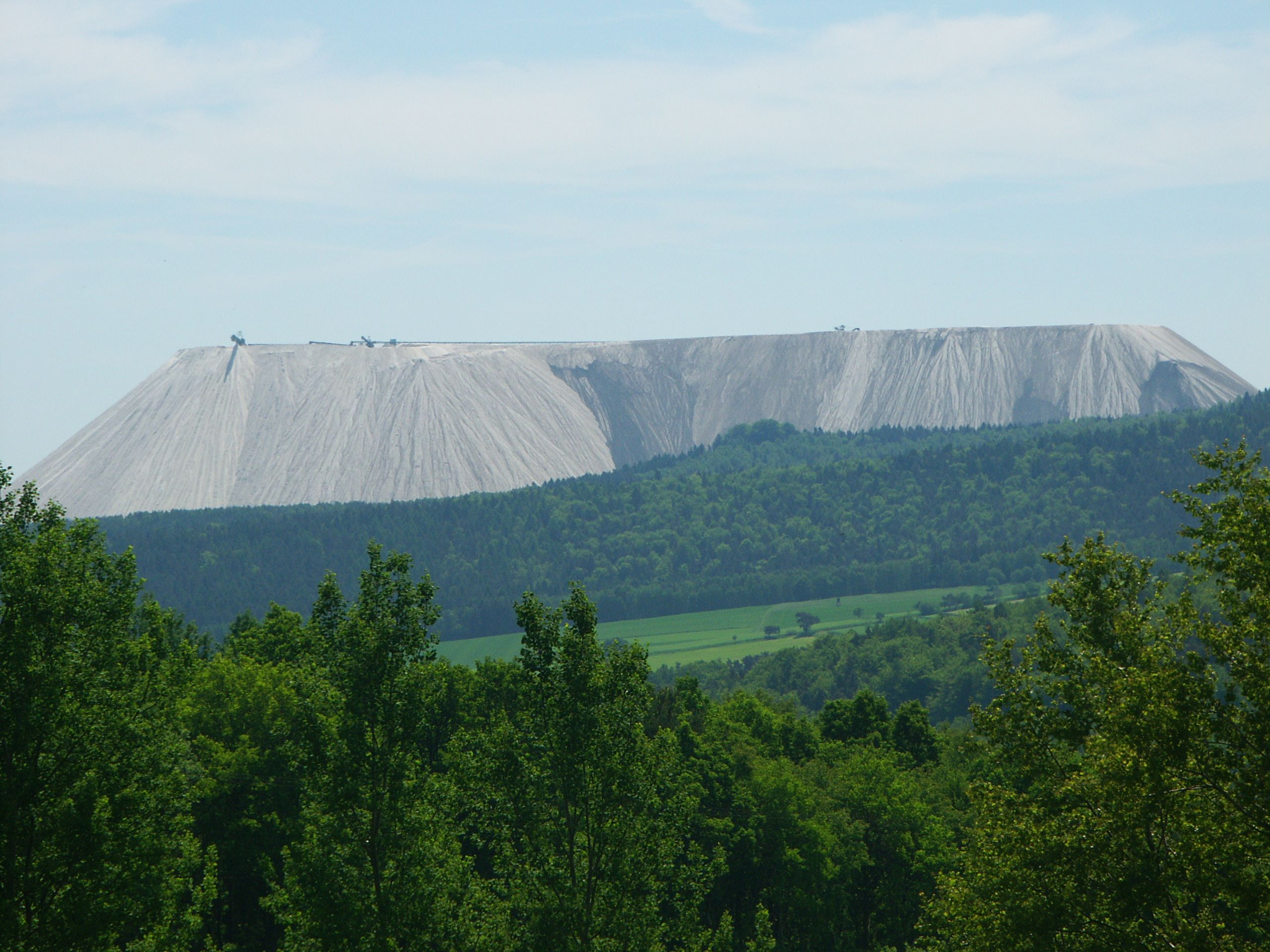
- Monte Kali and Hornungskuppe hill

Highest point
- Elevation: 520 m (1,710 ft)
- Prominence: 132 m (433 ft)
- Coordinates: 50°54′17″N 9°59′20″E

Geography
- Location: Heringen, Hesse, Germany

Monte Kali and Kalimanjaro are local colloquial names for the spoil heap or spoil tip that towers over the town of Heringen, Hesse, Germany. It is one of a number of sites where the K+S chemical company dumps sodium chloride (common table salt), a byproduct of potash mining and processing, a major industry in the area.

The names are puns of Kali (shorthand for Kalisalz, German for "potash") on "Monte Carlo" and "Kilimanjaro." The heap is near to the border with the state of Thuringia, and hence next to the former inner German border with what was once East Germany.

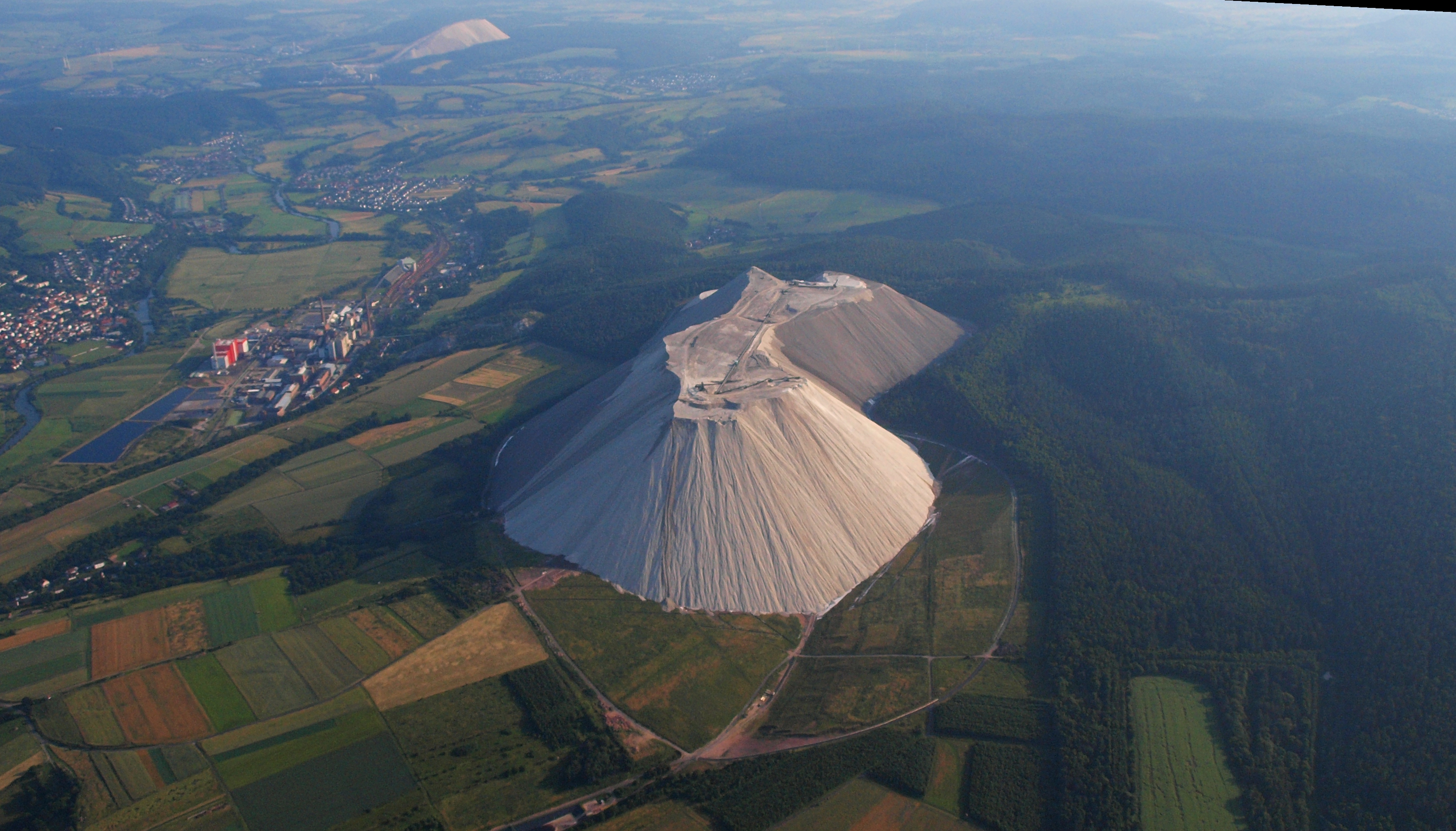
Monte Kali and Heringen; in the background, a similar heap at Philippsthal

The heap rises over 250 metres (820 ft) above the surrounding land, its summit reaching 520 metres (1,710 ft) above sea level. According to the Werra Potash Mining Museum in Heringen, Monte Kali has been in operation since 1976; as of August 2016, it covered 98 hectares (240 acres) and contained approximately 201 million tonnes of salt, with another 900 tonnes being added every hour and 7.2 million tonnes a year.

The mountain is open for visitation, usually on the weekends and a ticket costs €8. Yoga courses and special tours on the mountain are also possible.

== Ecological impact ==
The Werra river has become salty: ≥500 mg/L chloride at Gerstungen, and 65 mg/L chloride at Bad Salzungen (measurement of June 2003). The legal limit is at 2,500 mg/L chloride, which is saltier than parts of the Baltic Sea. The groundwater has become salty as well. The invertebrate fauna was reduced from 60–100 species to 3. K+S are licensed to keep dumping salt at the facility until 2030.
