= Bebra (Fulda) =

River in Germany

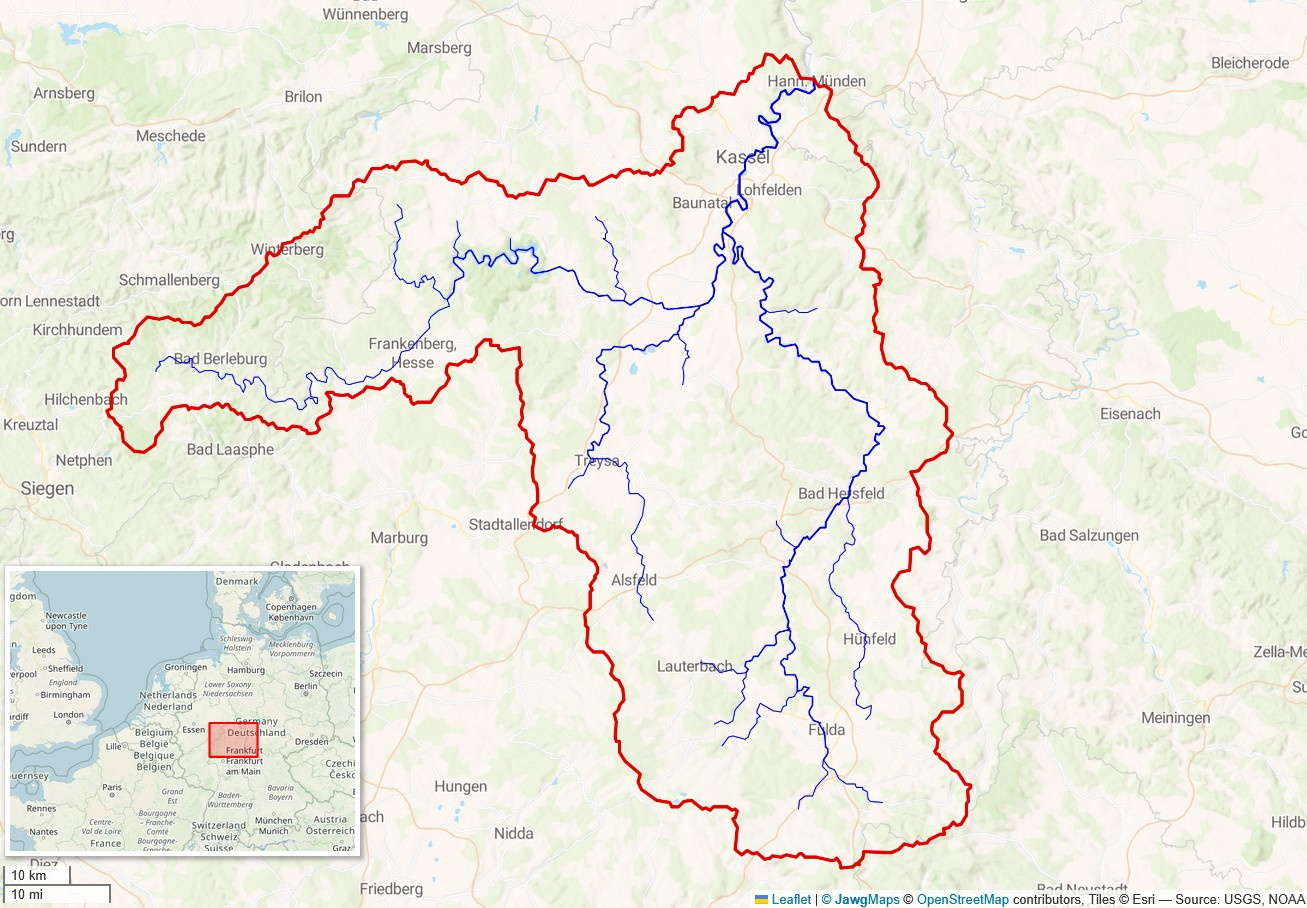
- Drainage Basin of the Bebra (Interactive map)

Location
- Country: Germany
- State: Hesse

Physical characteristics
- Source
  - location: About 200 m south of the Wasserkuppe Airport
  - coordinates: 50.492°N 9.954°E
- Mouth
  - location: Fulda
  - coordinates: 50.9743°N 9.7694°E
- Length: 10.0 km (6.2 mi)

Basin features
- Progression: Fulda→ Weser→ North Sea

The Bebra (German pronunciation: [ˈbeːbʁa]) is a river of Hesse, Germany and a tributary of the Fulda. It flows into the right bank of the Fulda near Bebra.

The Bebra rises on the western slopes of the Brodberg (376.5 m above sea level) about one kilometre northeast of Rautenhausen, a district of Bebra. A second source stream coming from the north flows into Rautenhausen.

== See also ==
- List of rivers of Hesse
