= Ludwigsau =

- Municipality
- Coat of arms

- Location of Ludwigsau within Hersfeld-Rotenburg district
- Interactive map of Ludwigsau
- Location within Germany Location within Hesse
- Coordinates: 50°54′N 09°46′E
- Country: Germany
- State: Hesse
- Admin. region: Kassel
- District: Hersfeld-Rotenburg

Government
  - Mayor (2018–24): Wilfried Hagemann (Ind.)

Area
  - Total: 111.92 km^{2} (43.21 sq mi)
- Elevation: 192–520 m (630–1,706 ft)

Population (2025-12-31)
  - Total: 5,409
  - Density: 48.33/km^{2} (125.2/sq mi)
- Time zone: UTC+01:00 (CET)
  - Summer (DST): UTC+02:00 (CEST)
- Postal codes: 36251
- Dialling codes: 06670, 06621
- Vehicle registration: HEF
- Website: www.ludwigsau.de

Ludwigsau is a municipality in Hersfeld-Rotenburg district in northeastern Hesse, Germany. With an area of 112 km^{2} it is Hesse's biggest community by land area.

== Geography ==
=== Location ===
The community lies on the Fulda in the triangle defined by the towns of Bad Hersfeld, Bebra and Rotenburg an der Fulda. The municipal area lies on the edge of the Seulingswald (range) and stretches along the Rohrbach and Endersbach (streams) into the eastern Knüll (range). The Rohrbach empties into the Fulda near Reilos. The Rohrbach valley is also known as the Besengrund (“Broom Ground” or “Besom Ground”), a reference to basket weavers and broom makers. In centuries gone by, these were common occupations.

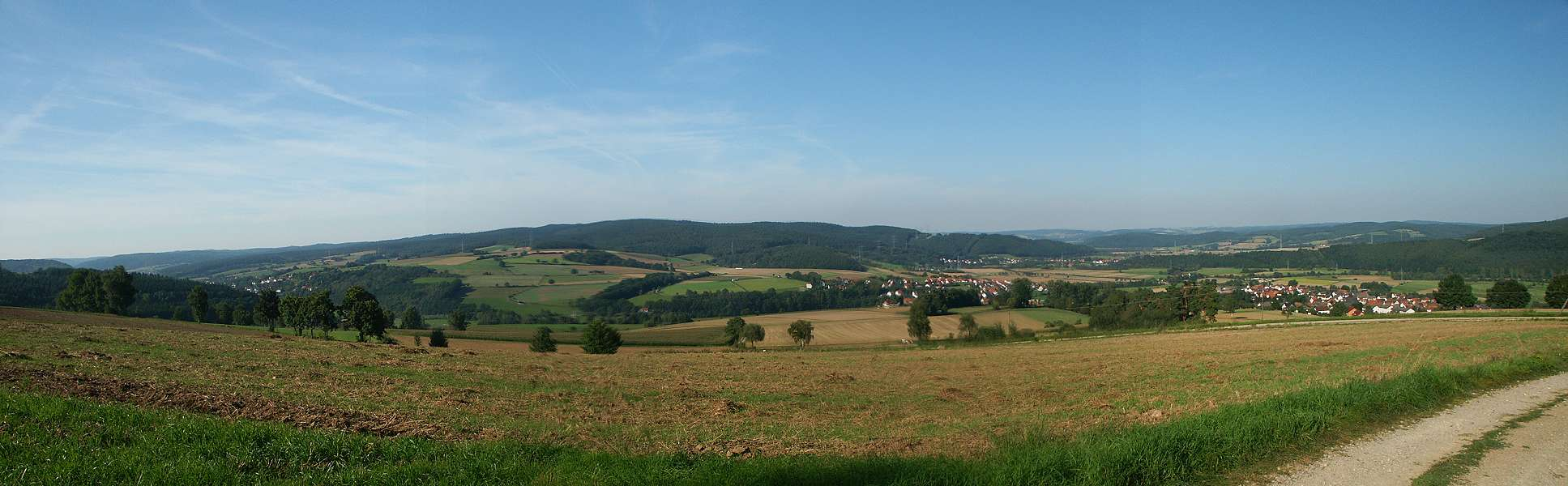
View over parts of the community of Ludwigsau

=== Neighbouring communities ===
Ludwigsau borders in the north on the community of Alheim and town of Rotenburg an der Fulda, in the east on the town of Bebra and the community of Ronshausen, in the southeast on the community of Friedewald, in the south on the town of Bad Hersfeld and in the west on the communities of Neuenstein (all in Hersfeld-Rotenburg) and Knüllwald (in the Schwalm-Eder-Kreis).

=== Constituent communities ===
Ludwigsau's 13 Ortsteile are Beenhausen, Biedebach, Ersrode, Friedlos, Gerterode, Hainrode, Meckbach, Mecklar, Niederthalhausen, Oberthalhausen, Reilos, Rohrbach and Tann.

== History ==
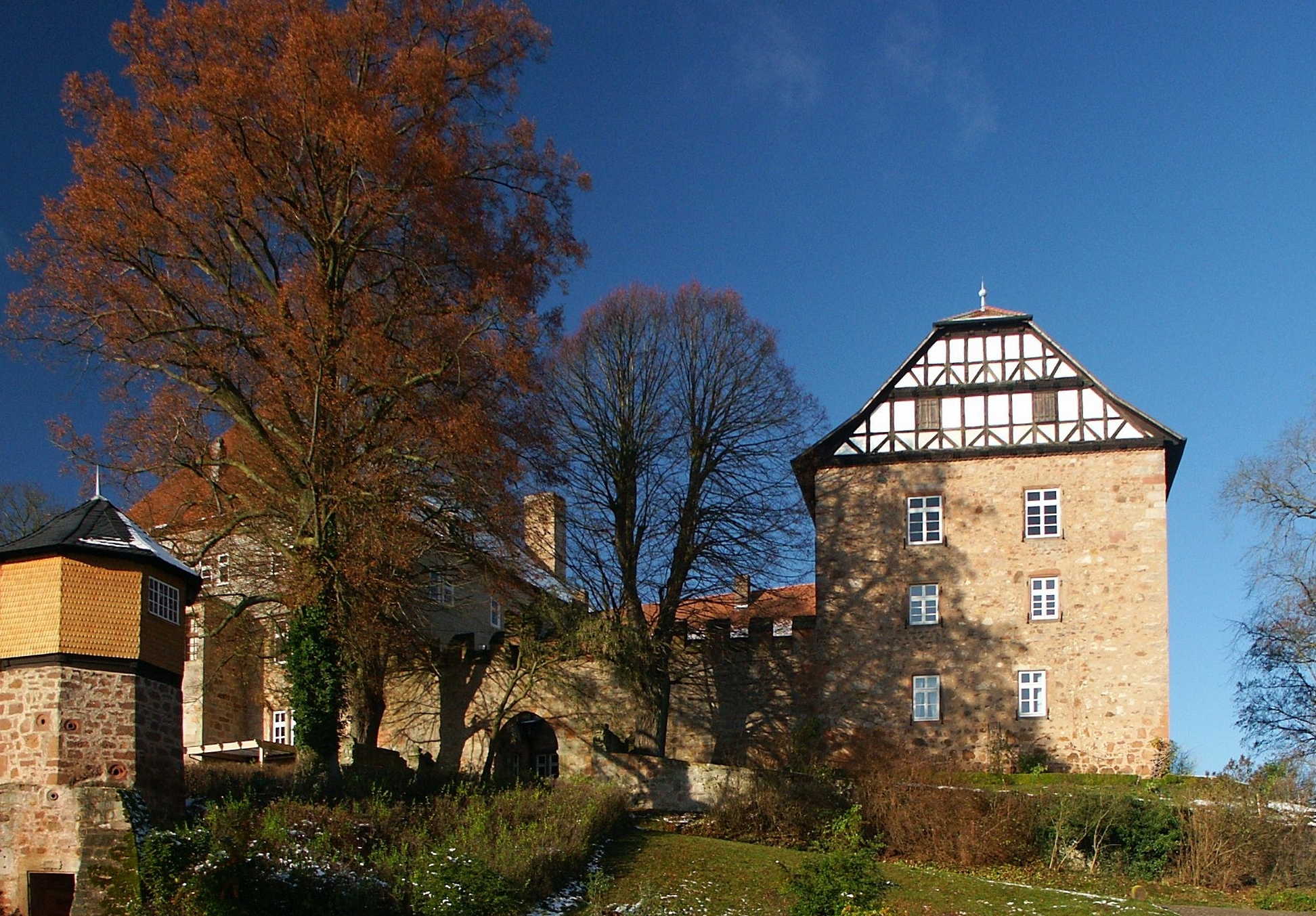
Schloss Ludwigseck

Within the framework of municipal reform in Hesse in 1972, two greater communities were founded in the Fulda valley, the Besengrund and the neighbouring valleys north of Bad Hersfeld. After a short time, these areas, along with further villages that until now had been self-administering, were melded into the greater community of Ludwigsau. The community's namesake is Landgrave Ludwig I of Hesse, who had two castles built within what are now municipal limits, Schloss Ludwigseck and Ludwigsaue Castle (built in 1416). Of the later, no trace is to be found today. It stood, however, at the mouth of the Rohrbach, where it empties into the Fulda.

=== Amalgamations ===
With effect from 31 December 1971, the community of Ludwigseck came into being through the voluntary merger of the formerly self-administering communities of Beenhausen, Ersrode, Hainrode and Oberthalhausen. At the same time, the community of Ludwigsau came into being through the voluntary merger of the formerly self-administering communities of Biedebach, Friedlos, Gerterode, Meckbach, Mecklar, Reilos, Rohrbach and Tann. Friedlos in particular was interested in a forcible merger with the district seat of Bad Hersfeld.

Since Niederthalhausen had come out against a merger with Ludwigseck, in the course of municipal reform on 1 August 1972 – after only seven months of existence – the community of Ludwigseck was dissolved and the whole municipal area, along with Niederthalhausen, was forcibly merged with the greater community of Ludwigsau.

== Politics ==
=== Community council ===
The municipal election held on 26 March 2006 yielded the following results:

| Parties and voter communities | | % 2006 | Seats; 2006 | % 2001 | Seats; 2001 |
| CDU | Christian Democratic Union of Germany | 38.8 | 12 | 38.3 | 12 |
| SPD | Social Democratic Party of Germany | 61.2 | 19 | 61.7 | 19 |
| Total | | 100.0 | 31 | 100.0 | 31 |
| Voter turnout in % | | 61.1 | | 63.6 | |

The community's executive (Gemeindevorstand) is made up of eight members, with five seats allotted to the SPD and three to the CDU.

=== Mayor ===
- 1994–2018: Thomas Baumann (independent)
- 2018–incumbent: Wilfried Hagemann (independent)

=== Coat of arms ===
The community's arms might be described thus: Argent two bendlets wavy sinister azure, the chief dexter a castle embattled gules, the base sinister a waterwheel of the last.

The waterwheel's 13 blades stand for the constituent communities (although the German blazon does not mention that there should be thirteen of them), and the castle stands for, not the community's namesake castle, but the other one, Schloss Ludwigseck. The two wavy bendlets stand for the river Fulda and the Rohrbach.

=== Town partnerships ===
- Changé, Sarthe, France (near Le Mans) since 1997
- (Germany) Struth-Helmershof, Thuringia (now part of Floh-Seligenthal, near Schmalkalden) since 1990.

== Culture and sightseeing ==
=== Buildings ===
- Schloss Ludwigseck, between Beenhausen, Ersrode and Sterkelshausen, built about 1400, today owned by the family von und zu Gilsa
- Fliers’ Memorial “In der Nonnenrod”

=== Natural monuments ===
- Fuldaaue (“Fulda Floodplain”) conservation area with renaturalized gravel pit (near Mecklar)
- Malchustal landscape conservation area (near Ersrode)
- The Gernkopf (417 m above sea level, above Oberthalhausen)

== Economy and infrastructure ==
=== Transport ===
Through the constituent communities of Mecklar, Reilos and Friedlos runs Bundesstraße 27. In Friedlos is a railway station on the Bebra–Fulda railway served by Cantus (Line R5 in the Nordhessischer Verkehrsverbund). Mecklar station, which also included a big goods station, was closed in the 1980s, making the community somewhat hard to reach on public transport.

=== Established businesses ===
In the industrial area on the Fulda floodplain in Mecklar-Meckbach there has been since 2007 the DHL Exel Supply Chain with its own building. There are three long-distance gas pipelines near Mecklar-Meckbach, and in the community itself is an electrical substation.

This convinced the electrical firm Iberdrola to build a gas and steam power plant here. Building work is to begin in 2009.
