= Richelsdorf Hills =

Coordinates: 50°59′49″N 09°55′33″E

The Richelsdorf Hills (German: Richelsdorfer Gebirge) is the name given to a landscape in the German Central Uplands. The terrain is up to 478.2 m above sea level (NHN) high and forms a landscape characterised by mining (copper shale, cobalt, nickel) in the county of Hersfeld-Rotenburg in East Hesse. Despite its German suffix Gebirge ("hill range") these hills are not a true hill range, but a cultural landscape. Locally this also includes the whole surrounding region in the southeast of the Fulda-Werra Uplands; parts of the county of Werra-Meißner-Kreis to the south and the extreme northwest of the Thuringian county of Wartburgkreis are included.
