= Heringen =

- Town
- Coat of arms

- Location of Heringen within Hersfeld-Rotenburg district
- Interactive map of Heringen
- Location within Germany Location within Hesse
- Coordinates: 50°53′14″N 10°00′20″E
- Country: Germany
- State: Hesse
- Admin. region: Kassel
- District: Hersfeld-Rotenburg
- Subdivisions: 8 districts

Government
  - Mayor (2022–28): Julian Dietrich (SPD)

Area
  - Total: 61.2 km^{2} (23.6 sq mi)
- Elevation: 221 m (725 ft)

Population (2025-12-31)
  - Total: 6,621
  - Density: 108/km^{2} (280/sq mi)
- Time zone: UTC+01:00 (CET)
  - Summer (DST): UTC+02:00 (CEST)
- Postal codes: 36266
- Dialling codes: 06624
- Vehicle registration: HEF
- Website: www.heringen.de

Heringen (Werra) (German pronunciation: [ˈheːʁɪŋən]) is a small town in Hersfeld-Rotenburg district in eastern Hesse, Germany lying right at the boundary with Thuringia.

== Geography ==
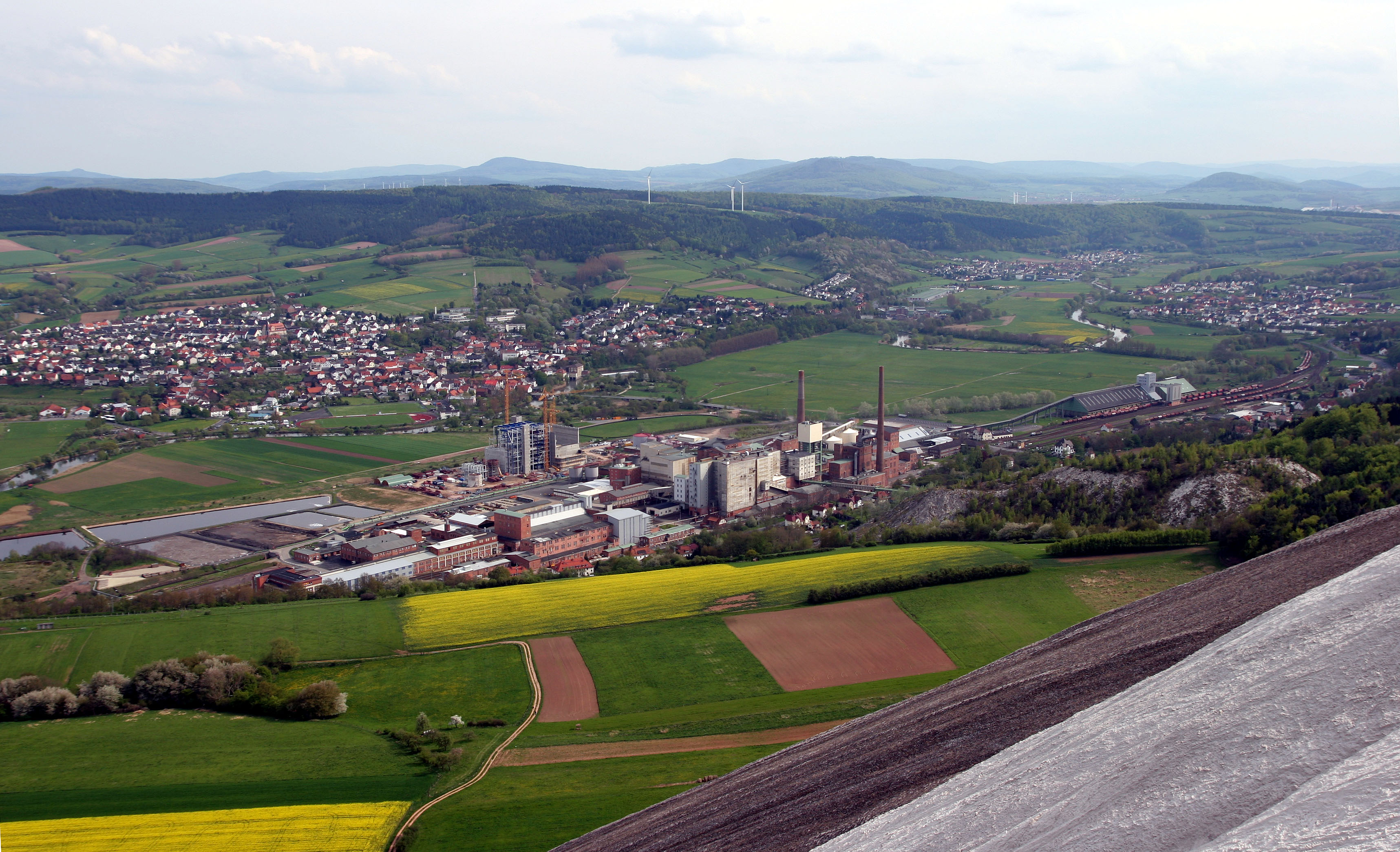
Heringen with K+S Kali GmbH's Wintershall works in the middle. Taken from Monte Kali

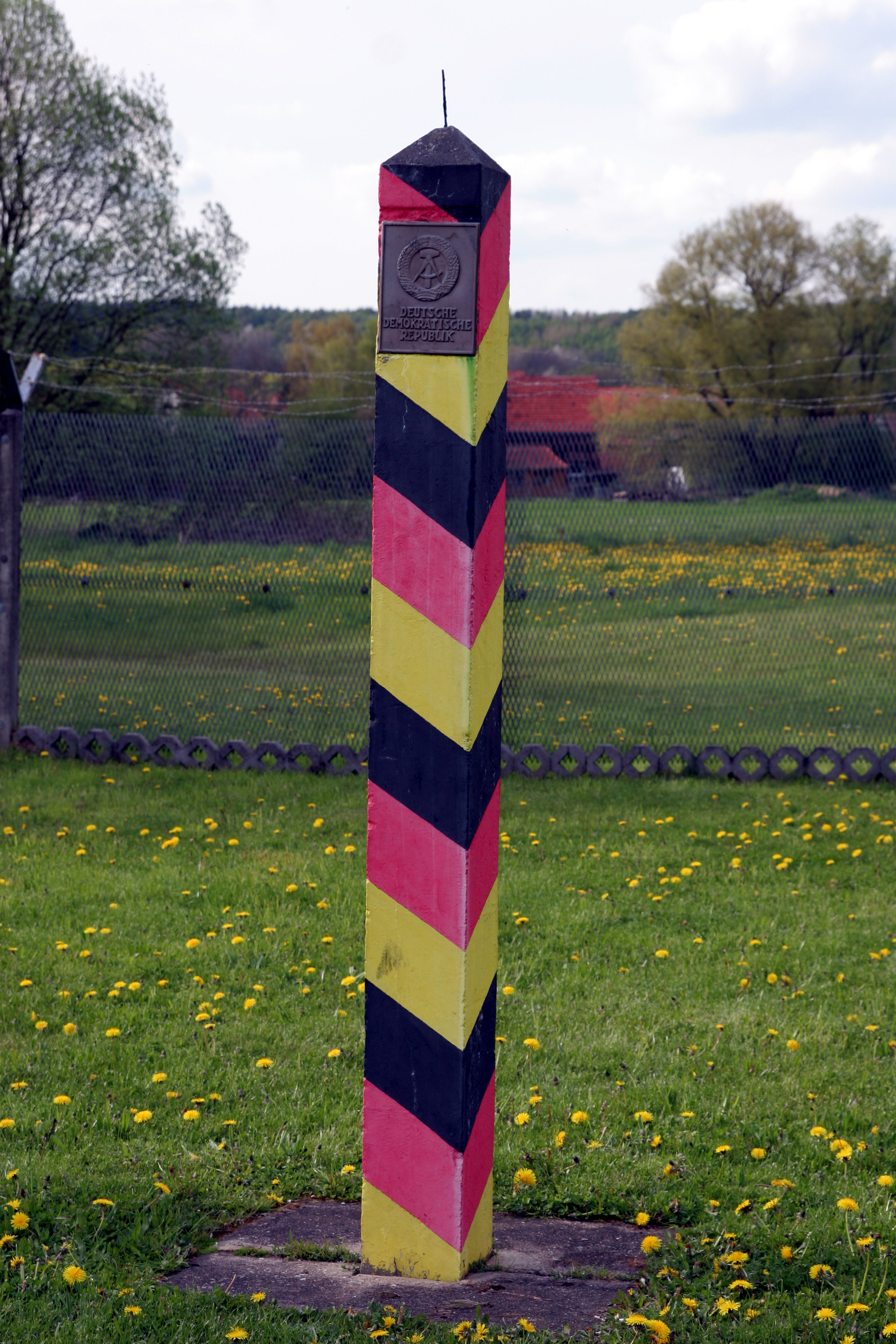
Former East German border post on the Hesse-Thuringia boundary between Kleinensee and Großensee

=== Location ===
The nearest major towns and cities are Bad Hersfeld (28 km to the west), Eisenach (30 km to the northeast) and Kassel (80 km to the north). The town lies on the river Werra, surrounded by outliers of the Thuringian Forest, the Seulingswald and the Anterior Rhön, all mountain or hill ranges.

The lowest point in town is found on the Werra floodplain at 210 m above sea level. The highest point within town limits is the Lehnberg at 471 m above sea level.

=== Neighbouring communities ===
Clockwise from the north, these are Wildeck, Verwaltungsgemeinschaft Berka/Werra, Philippsthal (Werra) und Friedewald.

=== Constituent communities ===
Heringen's Stadtteile, besides the main centre, also called Heringen, are Bengendorf, Herfa, Kleinensee, Leimbach, Lengers, Widdershausen and Wölfershausen.

== History ==
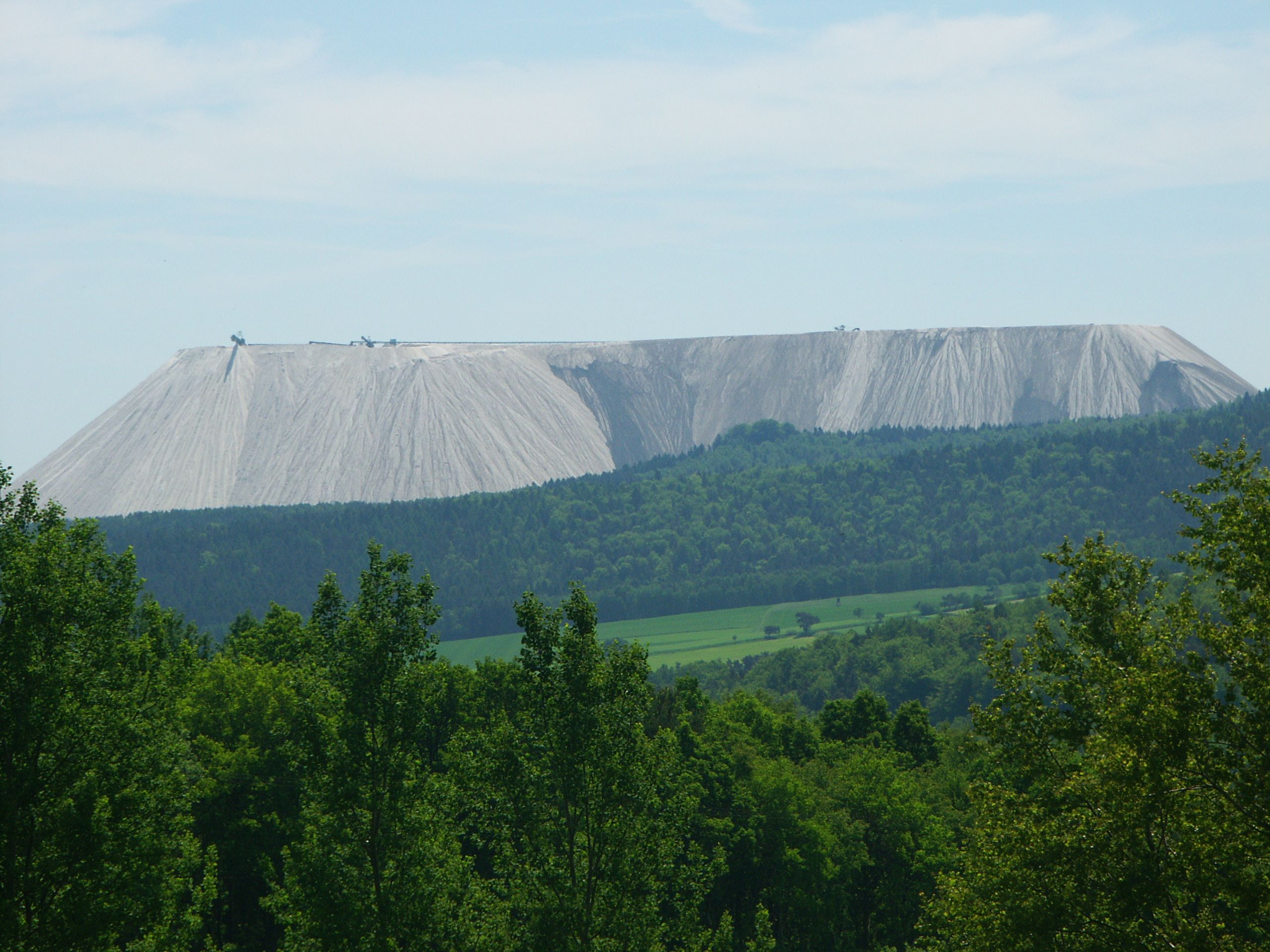
The Salzberg (“Salt Mountain”, also known locally as “Monte Kali”) at the Wintershall potash works in Heringen

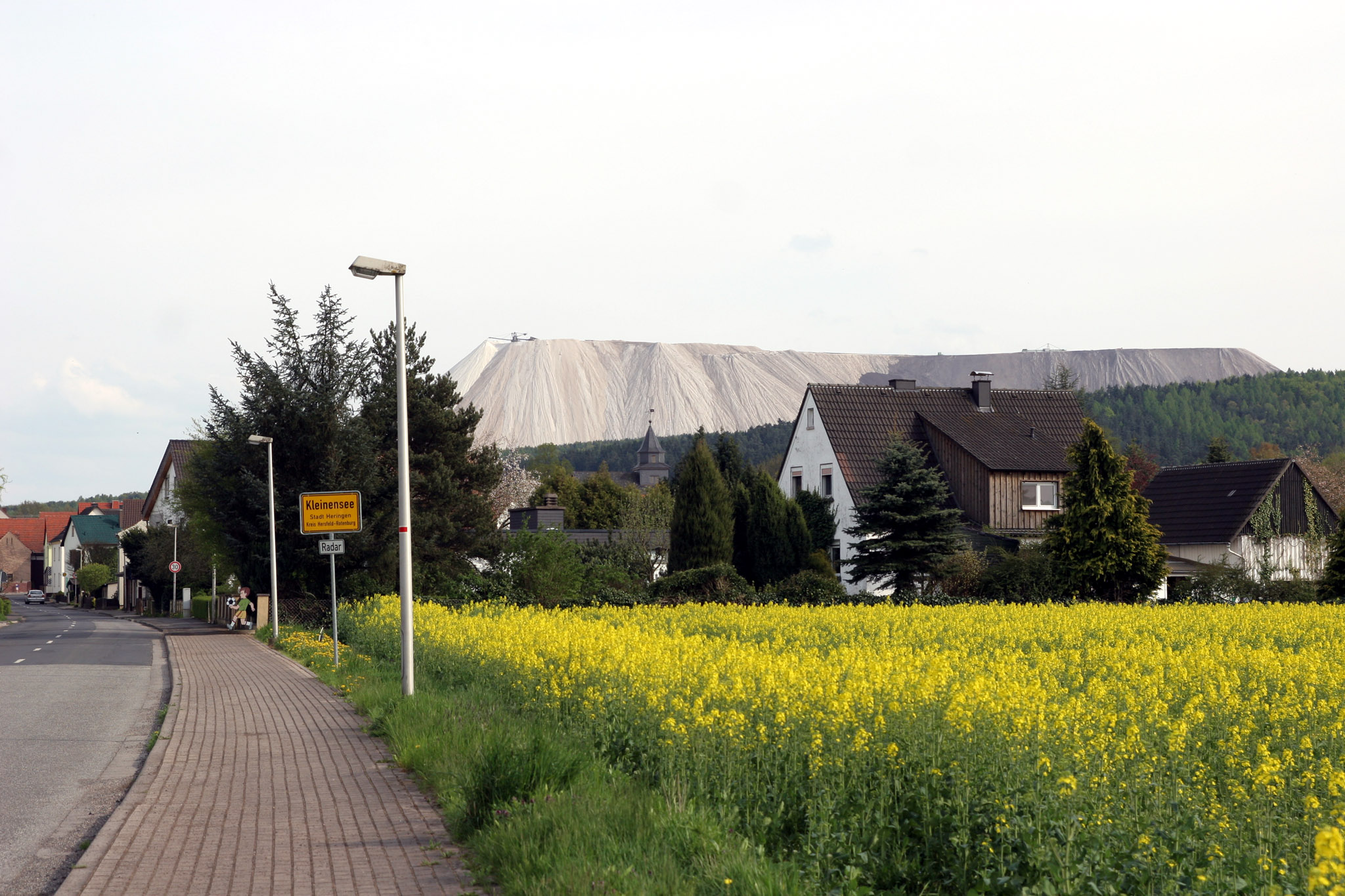
The outlying centre of Kleinensee with “Monte Kali” in the background

In 1153, Heringen had its first documentary mention. The Fulda Abbey enfeoffed the nobleman Heinrich von Heringen about 1170 with the place. The Heringen court comprised in the early 15th century not only the current town area but also the Thuringian centres of Vitzeroda, Gasteroda and Abteroda, all of which now belong to the Verwaltungsgemeinschaft Berka/Werra. In 1432, Margarethe von Heringen sold the court to the Landgraves of Hesse, thereby binding Heringen to Hesse.

With the opening of the Wintershall potash works, which began mining in 1903, the community got its first industrial jobs. Later, the Neu-Heringen and Herfa-Neurode potash mines were built. The mine is today the world's biggest potash-mining area and has an area about the same as Greater Munich's.

At the end of World War II, the libraries of the German Army's Military Geology Unit (Wehrgeologenstellen) and the German Patent Office (Reichspatentamt) were removed from Berlin and secretly stored in the deep Wintershall potash mine in Heringen. There they were discovered by the US Third Army in March 1945, and removed to the US. The German Patent Library was later restored to Germany, but the military geology materials of maps, reports and books, often stolen from other countries during the invasions, were retained by the US as Nazi materiel. Most of these maps and books remain in the US Geological Survey Library today, with an obscure United States Army Corps of Engineers stamp on each that reads "Heringen Collection".

Market rights were granted the community in 1526, and in 1977 came town rights to what was then a greater community (formed out of several smaller former communities).

There are also successor buildings of the knightly estate of Vultejus.

=== Amalgamations ===
Between 1968 and 1972 the above-named centres were amalgamated into a greater community, which was granted town rights in 1977 by the Hesse Land government.

=== Population development ===
Constituent communities	Population
	1998	1999	2000	2001	2002	2003
Heringen	3,402	3,558	3,637	3,631	3,603	3,623
Bengendorf	69	68	68	68	70	72
Herfa	836	880	869	867	853	838
Leimbach	471	488	511	512	522	504
Lengers	1,019	1,092	1,072	1,072	1,071	1061
Kleinensee	655	726	722	722	726	724
Widdershausen	1,140	1,204	1,190	1,190	1,203	1,193
Wölfershausen	1,091	1,150	1,139	1,137	1,117	1,101
Totals	8,683	9,166	9,208	9,199	9,165	9,116

== Politics ==
=== Town council ===
The municipal election held on 26 March 2006 yielded the following results:

Parties and voter communities		% 2006	Seats; 2006	% 2001	Seats; 2001
CDU	Christian Democratic Union of Germany	24.8	8	26.5	8
SPD	Social Democratic Party of Germany	40.0	12	50.1	16
WGH	Wählergruppe Gemeinschaftsliste Heringen	35.2	11	22.3	7
FDP	Free Democratic Party	–	–	1.0	0
Total		100.0	31	100.0	31
Voter turnout in %		59.3		64.5	

The town's executive (Magistrat) is made up of six councillors, with two seats allotted to the SPD, two to the CDU and 2 to the WGH. Manfred Wenk is the first ever WGH councillor.

=== Mayor ===
Mayor Daniel Iliev was elected in 2016 and 2022.

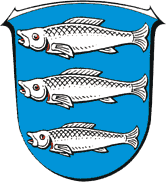
Heringen's old coat of arms, borne until 2003

=== Coat of arms ===
The town's arms might be described thus: Azure a bend wavy sinister argent between a sledgehammer and a cross-peen hammer per saltire, and three fish of the last.

The bend wavy sinister, that is, slanted wavy stripe beginning on the sinister (armsbearer's left, viewer's right) side and stretching down across the escutcheon, stands for the river Werra. The three fish come from the arms formerly borne by the Lords of Heringen (Hering is German for “herring”). The mining tools are, of course, a traditional miner's symbol. This charge was added to the coat of arms in 2003, as potash had been being mined here for a hundred years. The old arms are shown at right.

=== Town partnerships ===
- Rombas, Moselle, France

In 2007, partnership documents were signed with the following towns:

- (Germany) Heringen, Thuringia
- Odolanów, Ostrów Wielkopolski, Poland

== Culture and sightseeing ==
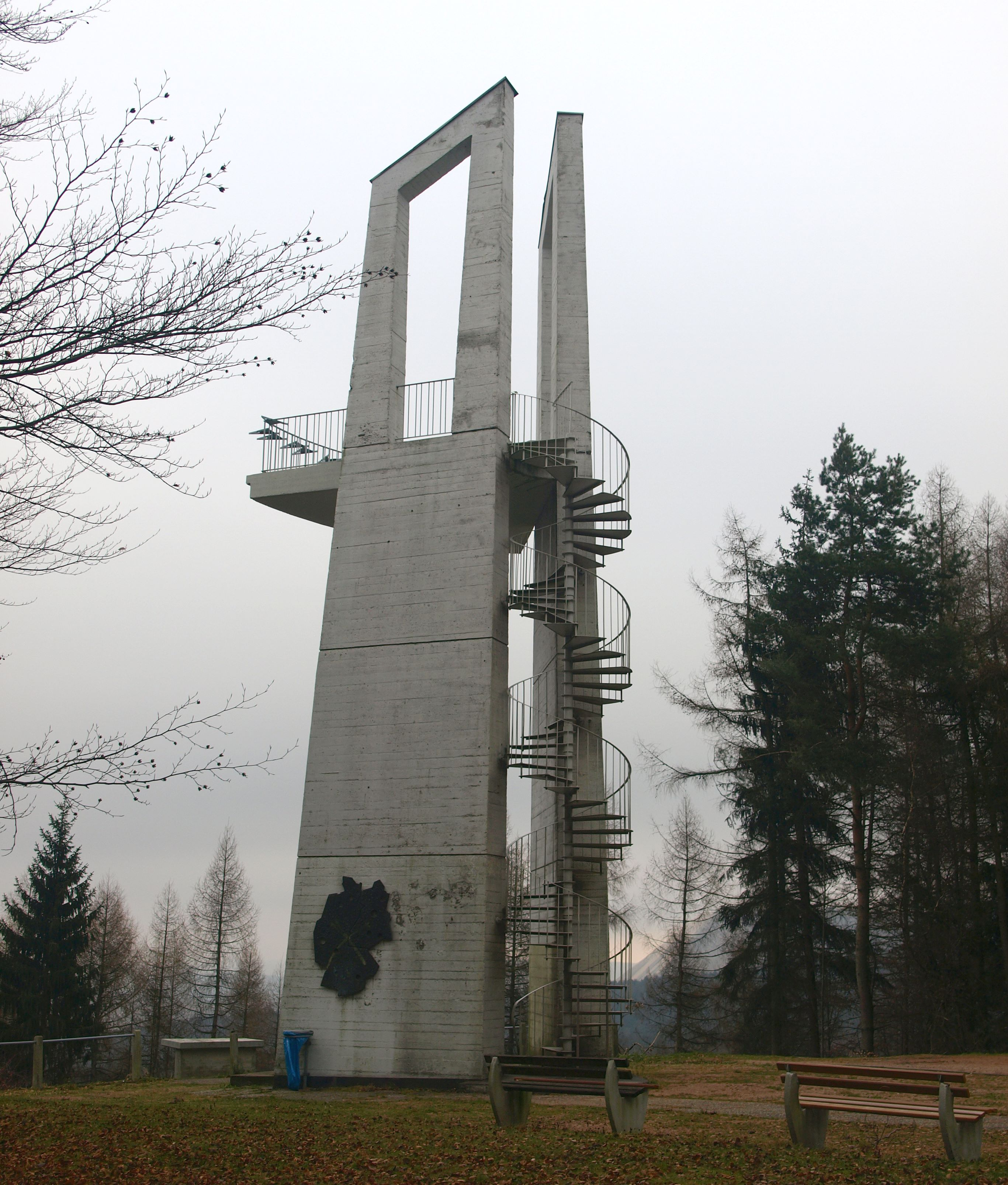
Bodesruh border memorial

=== Museums ===
- Werra-Kalibergbaumuseum (potash mining museum)

=== Buildings ===
- Potash tailings heap “Monte Kali” (Heringen “landmark”)
- Walterskirche church ruins (from a village thought to have been forsaken in the 15th century)
- Bodesruh memorial (tower, originally built as a monument to German division)
- Successor buildings of the knightly estate of Vultejus

=== Parks ===
- Rohrlache and Säulingssee (wetlands on the Werra floodplain)
- Herfa forest botany garden

=== Regular events ===
- Weekly market (Thursday mornings)

== Economy and infrastructure ==
=== Research and development ===
It was in Heringen that the invention of the electrostatic salt separation facility (elektrostatische Salz-Trennungsanlage, or ESTA) was first realized and further developed. After former mining director Prof. Dr.-Ing. Arno Singewald's research and inventions, the German potash-mining industry could introduce a environmental friendly means of processing the mined salts. Salt-saturated water is avoided when the ESTA is used. These facilities built at the potash works along the Werra have also seen to it that a river that was once thoroughly salted – by East German potash works – has been brought back to life.

=== Established businesses ===
- K+S Kali GmbH – potash mining (district's biggest employer)
- Schwabenhaus GmbH + Co. KG – prefabricated buildings
- Messer Industriemontagen & Apparatebau GmbH – pipeline and special steel construction

== Notable people ==
- Uwe Bein (b. 26 September 1960 in Heringen), professional footballer and world champion in 1990
- Jürgen Gehb (b. 9 August 1952 in Heringen), since 1998 Member of the Bundestag and currently rightwing speaker of the CDU/CSU Bundestag faction.
- Michael Roth (b. 24 August 1970 in Heringen), German SPD politician and Member of the Bundestag

== Bibliography ==
- Hadden, Robert Lee. 2003. "The Heringen Collection of the US Geological Survey Library" Geological Society of America. Seattle Annual Meeting (November 2–5, 2003). Paper No. 94-7. Abstract: "One special collection of German, Polish and Russian language books, maps and reports in the US Geological Survey Library has an interesting and unusual history. The “Heringen Collection” came from Nazi Germany. In the last days of the war, these maps, photos and other records were sent from the Military Geology offices in Berlin to the safety of a deep potash mineshaft in Heringen (Werra), in Hessen, Germany. A special group of US Army soldiers were ordered to find these lost records of the Third Reich. When found and removed from the Heringen mine, those records which dealt with the earth sciences, terrain analysis, military geology and other geological matters were sent to the USGS, and eventually came to reside at the USGS Library. The printed papers and books were mostly incorporated into our main collection, but a significant portion of the materials were never cataloged, calendared or indexed. This paper describes the history of the USGS Library's “Heringen Collection,” and some overview of the scope of the materials."
- Hadden, Robert Lee. 2008. "The Heringen Collection of the US Geological Survey Library of Reston, Virginia." Earth Sciences History, Volume 27, Number 2. Pages 242-265. ISSN 0736-623X. Abstract: "A special collection of German, Polish, and Russian language books, maps and reports in the US Geological Survey Library has an interesting and unusual history. The so-called ‘Heringen Collection’ came from Nazi Germany. Many of these items were captured from libraries, offices and even private homes as the German Army advanced into neighboring countries. In the last days of the war, these maps, reports, photos and other records were sent from the Military Geology offices in Berlin to the safety of a deep potash mineshaft in Heringen (Werra), in Hessen, Germany. A group of US Army soldiers found these lost records of the Third Reich. When removed from the Heringen mine, those records that dealt with the earth sciences, terrain analysis, military geology and other geological matters were sent to the USGS, and eventually came to reside at the USGS Library. The printed papers and books were mostly incorporated into the main collection, but a portion of the materials have never been cataloged, calendared or indexed. These materials have many current uses, including projects of value to citizens in their nations of origin."
- Willig, Dierk. 2009. "Die Odyssee des Wehrgeologenarchivs als Teil der Heringen Collection: Versuch einer Rekonstruktion der Vorgänge von März 1945 bis heute." Euskirchen: Amt für Geoinformationswesen der Bundeswehr. 31 pages.
