= Ulfe (Fulda) =

River in Germany

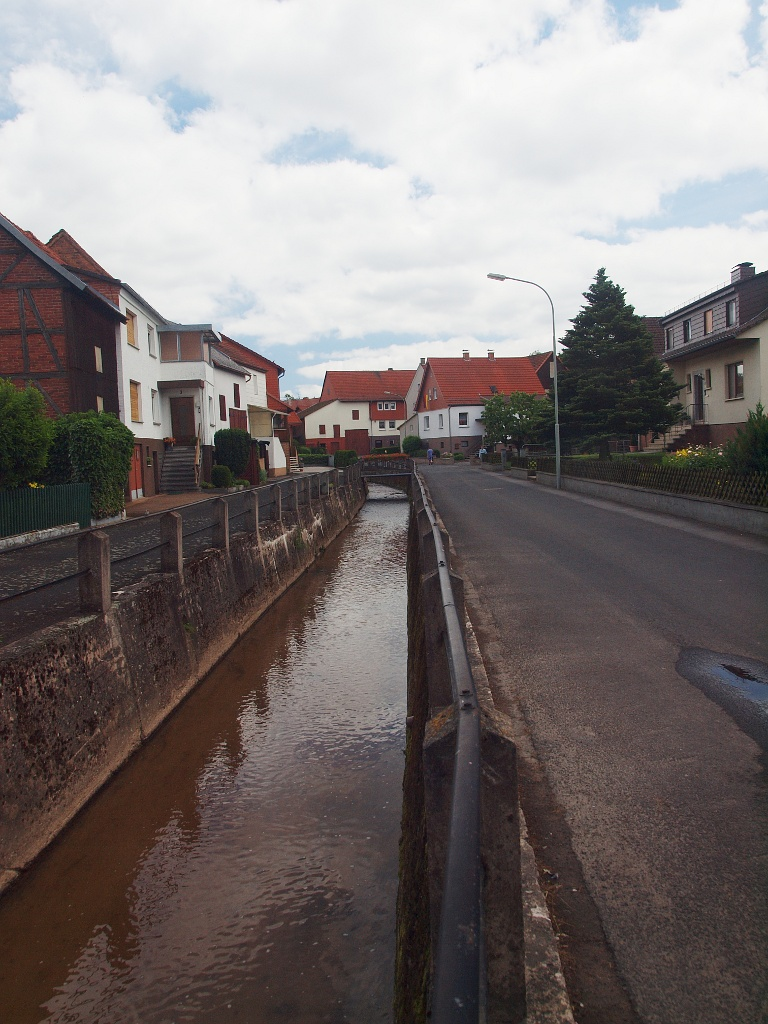

Location
- Country: Germany
- State: Hesse

Physical characteristics
- Mouth
  - location: Fulda
  - coordinates: 50.9556°N 9.7983°E
- Length: 10.6 km (6.6 mi)

Basin features
- Progression: Fulda→ Weser→ North Sea

Ulfe is a right tributary of the river Fulda in Hesse, Germany. It flows into the Fulda in Bebra.

== See also ==
- List of rivers of Hesse
