= Hersfeld-Rotenburg =

Coordinates: 50°55′N 9°45′E

- District
- Flag Coat of arms
- Country: Germany
- State: Hesse
- Adm. region: Kassel
- Capital: Bad Hersfeld

Government
  - District admin.: Torsten Warnecke (SPD)

Area
  - Total: 1,097.08 km^{2} (423.58 sq mi)

Population (31 December 2023)
  - Total: 118,010
  - Density: 110/km^{2} (280/sq mi)
- Time zone: UTC+01:00 (CET)
  - Summer (DST): UTC+02:00 (CEST)
- Vehicle registration: HEF, ROF
- Website: http://www.hef-rof.de

Hersfeld-Rotenburg is a Kreis (district) in the east of Hesse, Germany. Neighboring districts are Werra-Meißner, Wartburgkreis, Fulda, Vogelsbergkreis, Schwalm-Eder.

== History ==
In 1821, districts were created in Hesse, including the districts Hersfeld and Rotenburg, which stayed nearly unchanged (except a short period after the revolution of 1848, when they were dissolved) through the annexion of Hesse-Kassel (or Hesse-Cassel) by Prussia and the creation of the Hesse state. In 1972 both districts were merged into one.

== Geography ==
The district contains the hilly landscape of Waldhessen, the mountains are of the Knüllgebirge, Stölzinger Gebirge, Richelsdorfer Gebirge and the Kuppenrhön, part of the Rhön mountains.

== Transport ==
Bundesautobahn 7 and Bundesautobahn 4 pass through the district as well as Bundesstraße 27. The Frankfurt–Göttingen railway, a major rail corridor passes through the district with major train stations in Bad Hersfeld and Bebra with regional service to nearby cities.

== Coat of arms ==
The coat of arms is a combination of the two coat of arms of the precursor districts. The cross in the left half is taken from the old arms of the Hersfeld abbey; the linden branch is taken from the city arms of Rotenburg.

== Towns and municipalities ==
Clickable map of towns and municipalities in the district

Towns
1. Bad Hersfeld
2. Bebra
3. Heringen
4. Rotenburg an der Fulda
Municipalities
1. Alheim
2. Breitenbach am Herzberg
3. Cornberg
4. Friedewald
5. Hauneck
6. Haunetal
7. Hohenroda
8. Kirchheim

9. Ludwigsau
10. Nentershausen
11. Neuenstein
12. Niederaula
13. Philippsthal (Werra)
14. Ronshausen
15. Schenklengsfeld
16. Wildeck

== Twin towns ==
- Działdowo, Poland
- Hyvinkää, Finland
