= Waldkappel =

- Town
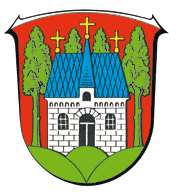
- Coat of arms

- Location of Waldkappel within Werra-Meißner-Kreis district
- Interactive map of Waldkappel
- Location within Germany Location within Hesse
- Coordinates: 51°09′N 09°53′E
- Country: Germany
- State: Hesse
- Admin. region: Kassel
- District: Werra-Meißner-Kreis

Government
  - Mayor (2020–26): Frank Koch (SPD)

Area
  - Total: 96.53 km^{2} (37.27 sq mi)
- Elevation: 257 m (843 ft)

Population (2025-12-31)
  - Total: 4,024
  - Density: 41.69/km^{2} (108.0/sq mi)
- Time zone: UTC+01:00 (CET)
  - Summer (DST): UTC+02:00 (CEST)
- Postal codes: 37284
- Dialling codes: 05656
- Vehicle registration: ESW
- Website: www.waldkappel.de

Waldkappel (German pronunciation: [ˈvaltˌkapl̩]) is a small town in the Werra-Meißner-Kreis district in northern Hesse, Germany.

== Geography ==
=== Location ===
Waldkappel is located between Hessisch Lichtenau in the west and Eschwege in the east in the North Hesse Upland between the Meißner-Kaufunger Wald Nature Park neighbouring it to the north and the Stölzinger Gebirge (range) in the south, in the Wehre valley.

=== Neighbouring communities ===
Waldkappel borders in the north on the community of Meißner, in the east on the community of Wehretal, in the south on the town of Sontra (all three in the Werra-Meißner-Kreis), in the southwest on the community of Cornberg and the town of Rotenburg an der Fulda (both in Hersfeld-Rotenburg) and in the west on the towns of Spangenberg (in the Schwalm-Eder-Kreis) and Hessisch Lichtenau (in the Werra-Meißner-Kreis).

=== Constituent communities ===
Waldkappel consists of 15 districts (Ger.: Stadtteile), namely its administrative centre Waldkappel as well as Bischhausen, Burghofen, Eltmannsee, Friemen, Gehau, Harmuthsachsen, Hasselbach, Hetzerode, Kirchhosbach, Mäckelsdorf, Rechtebach, Rodebach, Schemmern and Stolzhausen.

== History ==
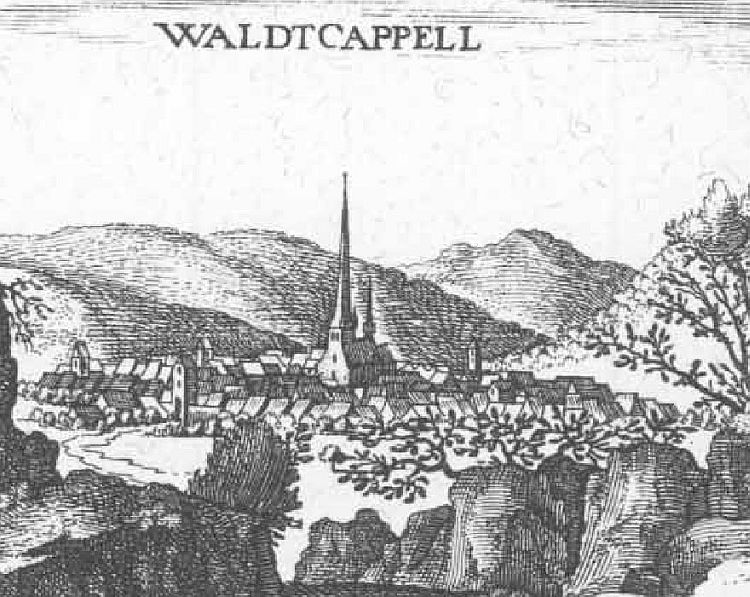
Waldkappel – extract from the Topographia Hassiae by Matthäus Merian 1655

Waldkappel was first officially mentioned in 1226 and was granted town rights in 1414.

The town experienced its economic heyday in the Late Middle Ages from lying on the old trade road durch die langen Hessen, which ran from the Wetterau to Thuringia and on to Leipzig. Bearing witness to the town’s earlier, wealthier times is a Late Gothic church standing in the middle of the community.

The Thirty Years' War put an abrupt end to Waldkappel’s prosperity; the town could never again reach its former importance.

In the course of municipal reform, the communities of Waldkappel, Bischhausen, Burghofen, Friemen, Gehau, Kirchhosbach, Mäckelsdorf, Rechtebach, Rodebach and Schemmern from the former Eschwege district merged. They were joined by Harmuthsachsen and Hasselbach from the former Witzenhausen district, as well as by Stolzhausen from the Melsungen district. In 1974, the greater community reached its full extent with the amalgamation of Eltmannsee and Hetzerode.

== Politics ==
=== Town council ===
The municipal election held on 26 March 2006 yielded the following results:

Parties and voter communities		% 2006	Seats; 2006	% 2001	Seats; 2001
CDU	Christian Democratic Union of Germany	32.2	7	24.9	8
SPD	Social Democratic Party of Germany	51.4	12	49.7	15
ÜWG	Überparteiliche Wählergemeinschaft	11.9	3	18.6	6
GAL	Grün-Alternative-Liste Waldkappel	4.5	1	–	–
GREENS	Bündnis 90/Die Grünen	–	–	6.8	2
Total		100.0	23	100.0	31
Voter turnout in %		58.1		63.4	

=== Town partnerships ===
- Carhaix, Finistère, France
- Rijnwoude, South Holland, Netherlands

== Economy and infrastructure ==
=== Transport ===
Through Waldkappel runs Bundesstraße 7. The Autobahn A 44 (Kassel–Eisenach) is under construction.

== Famous people ==
- Peter Griess (1829–1888), industrial chemist, born in Kirchhosbach
- Christian Schütz (1526–1592), Evangelical theologian
