= Kupferbach (Berka) =

River in Germany

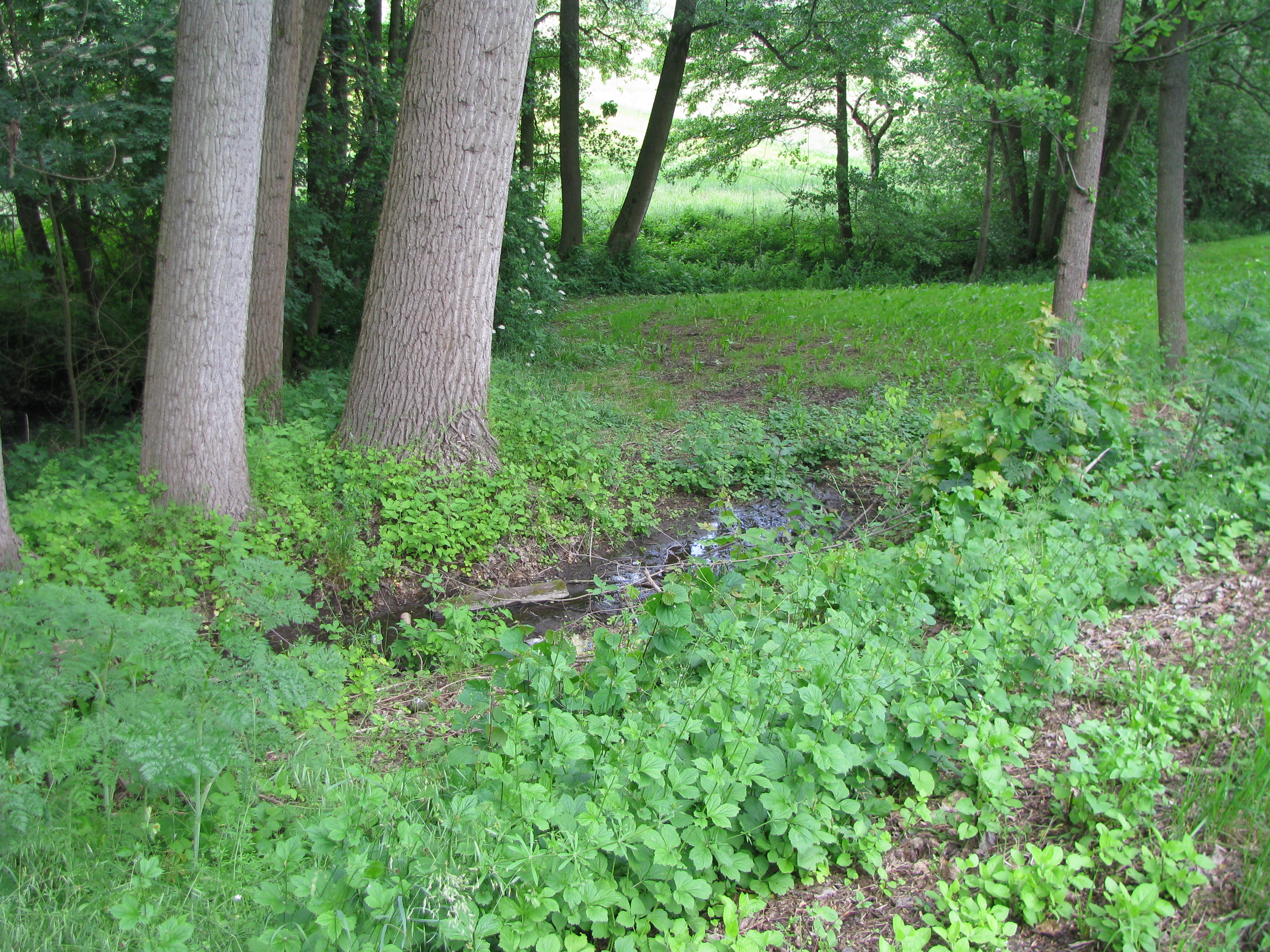

Location
- Country: Germany
- States: Hesse

Physical characteristics
- Mouth
  - location: Berka
  - coordinates: 51.2264°N 9.9551°E

Basin features
- Progression: Berka→ Werra→ Weser→ North Sea

Kupferbach is a small river of Hesse, Germany. It is a right tributary of the Berka near Wellingerode.

== See also ==
- List of rivers of Hesse
