= Ringgau =

- Municipality
- Coat of arms

- Location of Ringgau within Werra-Meißner-Kreis district
- Interactive map of Ringgau
- Location within Germany Location within Hesse
- Coordinates: 51°05′N 10°04′E
- Country: Germany
- State: Hesse
- Admin. region: Kassel
- District: Werra-Meißner-Kreis
- Subdivisions: 7 districts

Government
  - Mayor (2019–25): Mario Hartmann

Area
  - Total: 66.8 km^{2} (25.8 sq mi)
- Elevation: 379 m (1,243 ft)

Population (2025-12-31)
  - Total: 2,832
  - Density: 42.4/km^{2} (110/sq mi)
- Time zone: UTC+01:00 (CET)
  - Summer (DST): UTC+02:00 (CEST)
- Postal codes: 37296
- Dialling codes: 05658, 05659
- Vehicle registration: ESW
- Website: www.ringgau.de

Ringgau (German pronunciation: [ˈʁɪŋɡaʊ]) is a municipality in the Werra-Meißner-Kreis in Hesse, Germany.

== Geography ==
=== Location ===
The community of Ringgau lies in the like-named low mountain range some 11 km (as the crow flies) south of Eschwege between the Hoher Meißner and the Thuringian Forest.

=== Neighbouring communities ===
Ringgau borders passes in the north on the communities of Wehretal und Weißenborn (both in the Werra-Meißner-Kreis), in the east on the Thuringian community of Ifta (Wartburgkreis), in the south on the community of Herleshausen and in the west on the town of Sontra (both in the Werra-Meißner-Kreis).

=== Constituent communities ===
The community’s Ortsteile are Datterode, Grandenborn, Lüderbach, Netra (administrative seat), Renda, Rittmannshausen and Röhrda.

== History ==
Until the 13th century, the area was Thuringian, but then changed hands several times in the Thuringian-Hessian War of Succession between Hesse and Thuringia before it ended up in Hesse’s hands permanently in 1436. The Boyneburg right nearby drew both emperors and kings as an Imperial castle, along with whom came many a knight and trooper over these fields. Not least of all, the road through the Netra valley afforded an important connection from Leipzig to Frankfurt, and was well known by the name of die langen Hessen.

=== Founding of the community ===
On 31 December 1971, the communities of Netra, Grandenborn, Lüderbach, Renda and Rittmannshausen merged into the greater community of Ringgau. Datterode and Röhrda, which had merged to form the greater community of Netratal in 1972, were integrated into Ringgau at the beginning of 1974.

== Politics ==
=== Community council ===
The municipal election held on 26 March 2006 yielded the following results:

Parties and voter communities		% 2006	Seats; 2006	% 2001	Seats; 2001
CDU	Christian Democratic Union of Germany	23.3	5	23.5	5
SPD	Social Democratic Party of Germany	42.8	10	47.2	11
ÜWG	Überparteiliche Wählergemeinschaft	33.9	8	29.4	7
Total		100.0	23	100.0	23
Voter turnout in %		65.2		73.4	

=== Mayors ===
- 1974–1995: Herbert Grüneberg
- 1995–2006: Helmut Jakob
- 2006–2019: Klaus Fissmann
- 2019–incumbent: Mario Hartmann

=== Coat of arms ===
The community’s arms might be described thus: A bend wavy argent, above gules an oak twig with three acorns and two leaves Or, below azure three ears of grain on one stem of the last.

The German blazon does not mention what kind of grain the latter charge represents.

The coat of arms was approved on 17 May 1977 by the Hessian Interior Minister.

== Culture and sightseeing ==
=== Museums ===
- Boyneburg- und Heimatstube des Heimatverein Datterode e. V. (Boyneburg castle and local history)

=== Buildings ===
- Moated palace in the constituent community of Netra
- Boyneburg castle ruins
- Berliner Turm, lookout tower above Datterode
- Acht-Mühlen-Brunnen (“Eight-Mill Spring”) and the eight mills (Röhrda)
- Watchtower of the former Observation Post India near Lüderbach
- Abandoned church near Harmutshausen (Datterode)
- Schloss Lüderbach (Lüderbach)
- Memorial (Datterode)
- Schloss Röhrda (Röhrda)

=== Regular events ===
On Ascension Day, a folk festival with church service by the minister from Datterode and the traditional giving of bread by the Lords of Boyneburg take place at the Boyneburg (castle, now in ruins).

In Datterode at Whitsun, an outdoor team handball tournament has been held since 1992 by SG Datterode/Röhrda, in which more than 100 teams from across the country, of both sexes and all age groups, take part.

In all other constituent communities, a yearly tent kermis is staged.

== Economy and infrastructure ==
=== Transport ===
Through Bundesstraße 7 (Kassel–Eisenach), which runs right through the community, Ringgau is linked to the highway network.
