= Kupferbach =

Kupferbach may refer to:

- Kupferbach (Berka), a river of Hesse, Germany
- Kupferbach (Tannbach), a river of Thuringia and Bavaria, Germany
