= Sontra =

- Town
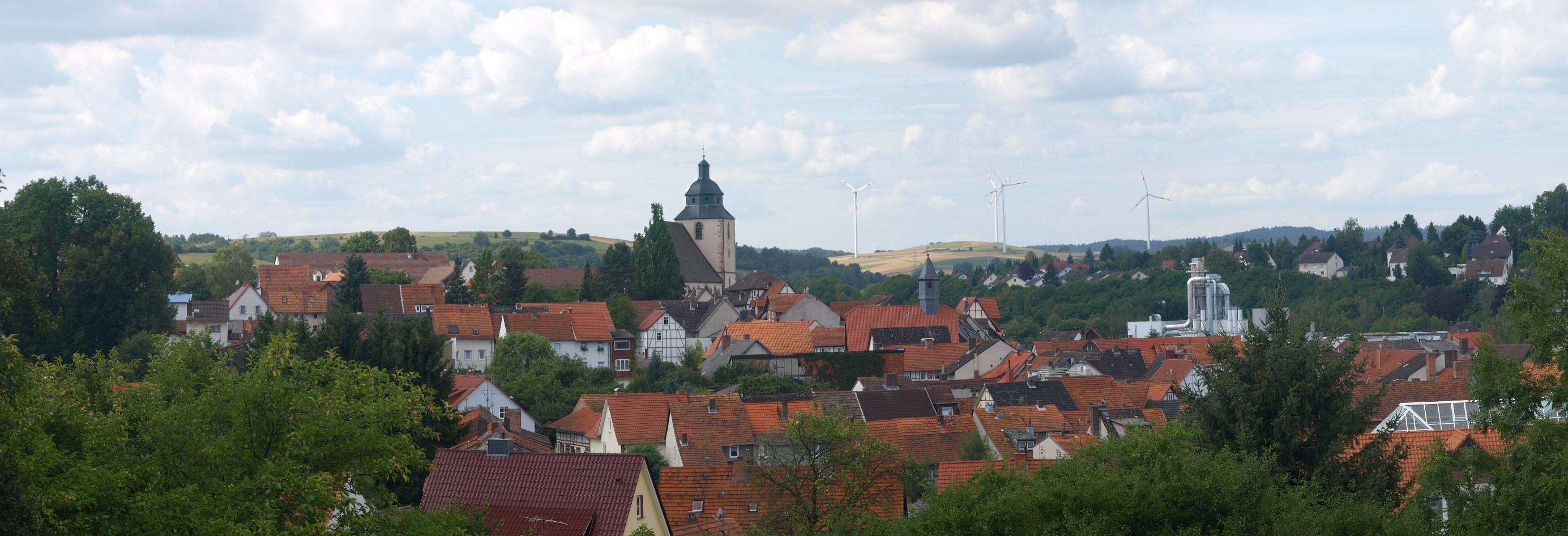
- Old town of Sontra

- Coat of arms

- Location of Sontra within Werra-Meißner-Kreis district
- Interactive map of Sontra
- Location within Germany Location within Hesse
- Coordinates: 51°4′N 09°56′E
- Country: Germany
- State: Hesse
- Admin. region: Kassel
- District: Werra-Meißner-Kreis

Government
  - Mayor (2020–26): Thomas Eckhardt (SPD)

Area
  - Total: 111.29 km^{2} (42.97 sq mi)
- Elevation: 265 m (869 ft)

Population (2025-12-31)
  - Total: 7,462
  - Density: 67.05/km^{2} (173.7/sq mi)
- Time zone: UTC+01:00 (CET)
  - Summer (DST): UTC+02:00 (CEST)
- Postal codes: 36205
- Dialling codes: 05653
- Vehicle registration: ESW
- Website: www.sontra.de

Sontra (German pronunciation: [ˈzɔntʁa]) is a small town in the Werra-Meißner-Kreis in northeastern Hesse, Germany.

The air spa of Sontra is known as Berg- und Hänselstadt, with Bergstadt referring to the time when there was bituminous shale mining (“mining” is Bergbau in German) in town, and Hänselstadt to the town's former membership in the Hanse. In the town, whose area covers 111.29 km², live 8,568 inhabitants.

== Geography ==
=== Location ===
Sontra lies between Bad Hersfeld (some 30 km to the southwest), Kassel (some 45 km to the northwest) and Eisenach (some 35 km to the east), east of the Stölzinger Gebirge, north of the Richelsdorfer Gebirge and west of the Ringgau (ranges), and also 16 km southwest of Eschwege. Flowing through town are the river Sontra, which near Wehretal empties into the Wehre, and the river Ulfe, which empties into the Sontra near the outlying centre of Wichmannshausen.

=== Neighbouring communities ===
Sontra borders in the north on the town of Waldkappel and the community of Wehretal, in the east on the communities of Ringgau and Herleshausen (all in the Werra-Meißner-Kreis), in the southeast on the community of Gerstungen (in Thuringia’s Wartburgkreis), in the south on the communities of Wildeck and Nentershausen and in the southwest on the community of Cornberg (all three in Hersfeld-Rotenburg).

=== Constituent communities ===
Sontra’s 15 Ortsteile, besides the main town, also called Sontra, are Berneburg, Blankenbach, Breitau, Diemerode, Heyerode, Hornel, Krauthausen, Lindenau, Mitterode, Stadthosbach, [Thurnhosbach] de:Thurnhosbach, Ulfen, Weißenborn, Wichmannshausen and Wölfterode.

== History ==
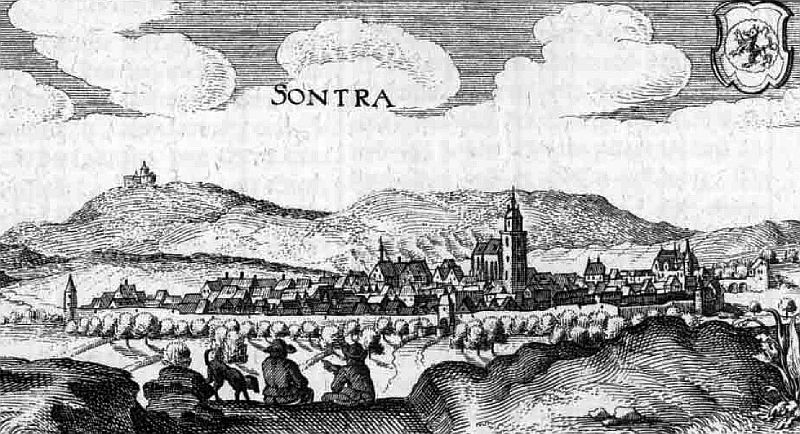
Sontra – extract from Topographia Hassiae by Matthäus Merian 1655

In 775, Sontra’s outlying centre of Ulfen had its first documentary mention. In the 8th century, Sontra itself was also mentioned for the first time. In 1232, a Kunigunde de Suntraha was named, who on a visit to Saint Elizabeth’s grave in Marburg experienced healing. Town rights were granted Sontra in 1368.

There was bituminous shale mining in Sontra beginning no later than 1499, and it continued right through to the 1950s.

In the centre of Donnershag, which is part of Sontra, the settlement society known as Freiland-Freigeld was resident in the 1920s.

== Politics ==
=== Town council ===
The municipal election held on 6 March 2016 yielded the following results: in comparison the elections in 2011:

Parties and voter communities		% 2011	Seats; 2011	% 2016	Seats; 2016
CDU	Christian Democratic Union of Germany	34.0	11	28.3	9
SPD	Social Democratic Party of Germany	50.1	16	58.1	18
GREENS	Alliance '90/The Greens	4.0	1	3.2	1
FDP	Free Democratic Party	4.0	1	-	-
BfS	Bürger für Sontra (Citizens for Sontra)	-	-	10,4	3
FWG	Freie Wählergemeinschaft Sontra	7.8	2	-	-
Total		100.0	31	100.0	31
Voter turnout in %		55.4		53.4	

=== Executive ===
The town's executive (Magistrat) is made up of nine councillors, with four seats allotted to the SPD, three to the CDU and one each to the FWG and the FDP.

=== Mayors ===
Thomas Eckhardt (SPD) was elected mayor in 2014, and re-elected in 2020. Previous mayors were:

- 2002–2014: Karl-Heinz Schäfer (SPD)
- 1994–2002: Gerhard Büchling (independent)

=== Coat of arms ===
The town's arms might be described thus: Or a rose azure sepalled vert surmounted by a lion rampant barry of eight argent and gules armed of the first.

This description is based on the arms shown in this article. However, the German blazon specifies that the lion (which is the Lion of Hesse, the main charge in Hesse's state coat of arms) should be a neun Mal von Silber und Rot geteilter Löwe, or “barry of nine”, that is, with nine horizontal stripes.

=== Town partnerships ===
- Vimoutiers, Orne, France since 1971
- Tambach-Dietharz, Thuringia since 1999

== Culture and sightseeing ==
=== Buildings ===
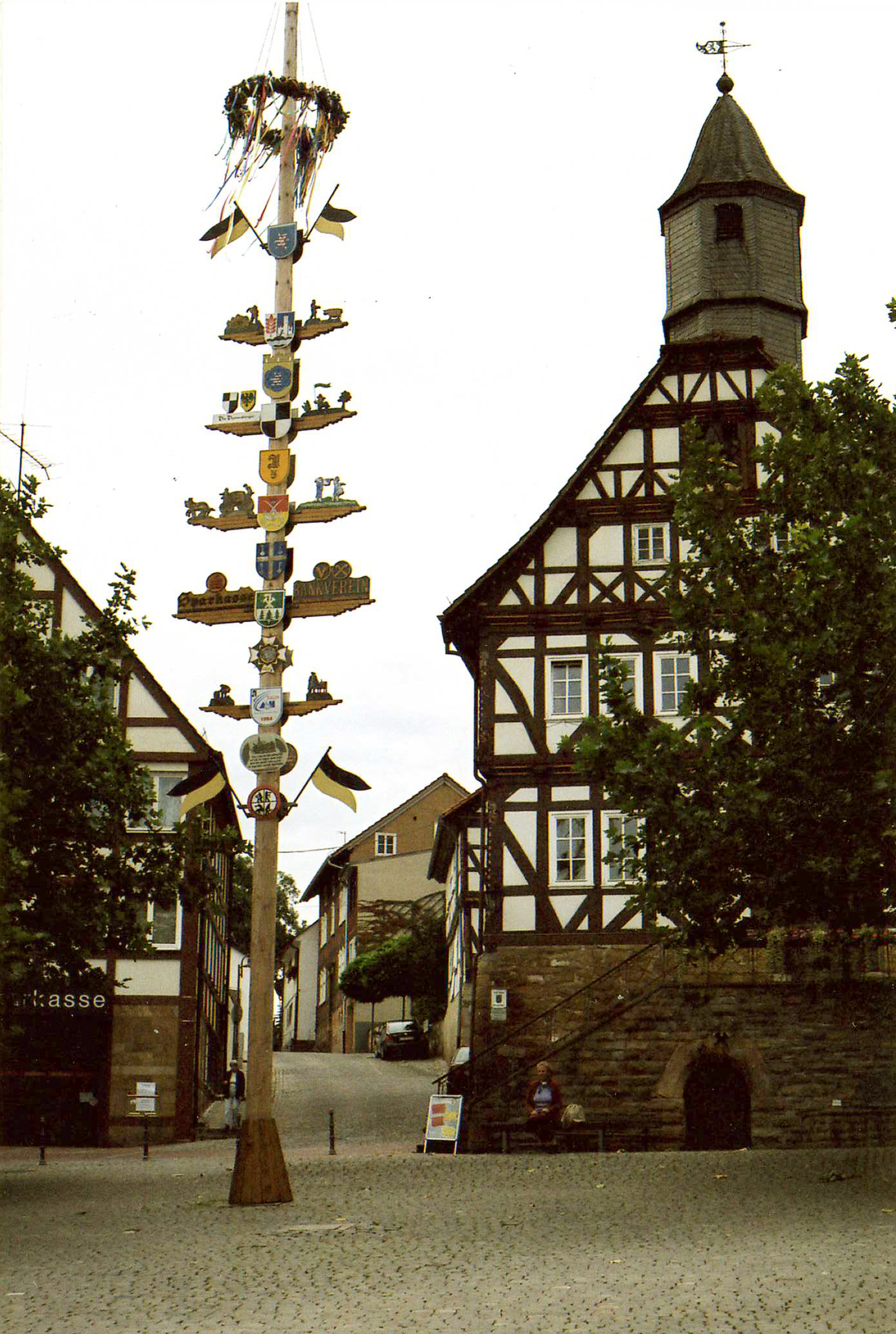
Town hall and maypole in 2004

- Historic town core with Town Hall from 1668
- Boyneburg ruins owned by the family von Boyneburg near Wichmannshausen in the Ringgau range
- Evangelical town church from 1488

=== Museums ===
- Museum at the old Boyneburg Palace in the outlying centre of Wichmannshausen
- Kleines Bergbau-Museum (bituminous shale mining) of Sontra
- Steinmühlen-Museum in Sontra

=== Sport ===
Popular sports are practised in town by TV Sontra 1861 e.V. in several departments. Further sports can be played at the leisure and adventure pool (outdoor swimming pool) with its giant waterslide, a miniature golf course and a skittles centre.

There are two shooting clubs in town, the Schützengilde Sontra and the Sportschützenverein 1958 Sontra e. V. On the Dornberg near Sontra, the Mittelhessischer Verein für Flugsport e.V. Sontra/Bebra (aerial sports) runs the Dornberg-Sontra gliding airfield.

SG Sontra 1919 e.V. is the resident football club and currently plays in the Kreisliga A.

== Economy and infrastructure ==
=== Transport ===
Through the town run Bundesstraßen 27 and 7. The Autobahn A 44 (Kassel–Eisenach), which will lead around the outlying centres, is either in planning or under construction.

There is a link to the A 4 (Aachen–Görlitz) at the Wommen/Sontra interchange.

A railway connection is to be had at Sontra railway station on the Bebra–Göttingen line.

=== State institutions ===
In 1962, the Husarenkaserne (“Hussars’ Barracks”) was built. Stationed here was the Panzeraufklärungsbataillon 5 (“armoured reconnaissance battalion”). The property, which once had 780 service posts, was dissolved with effect from 30 June 2008.

=== Education ===
In Sontra there are the Adam von Trott-Schule (comprehensive school), two primary schools and the Barbaraschule (school for help with learning).

== Famous people ==
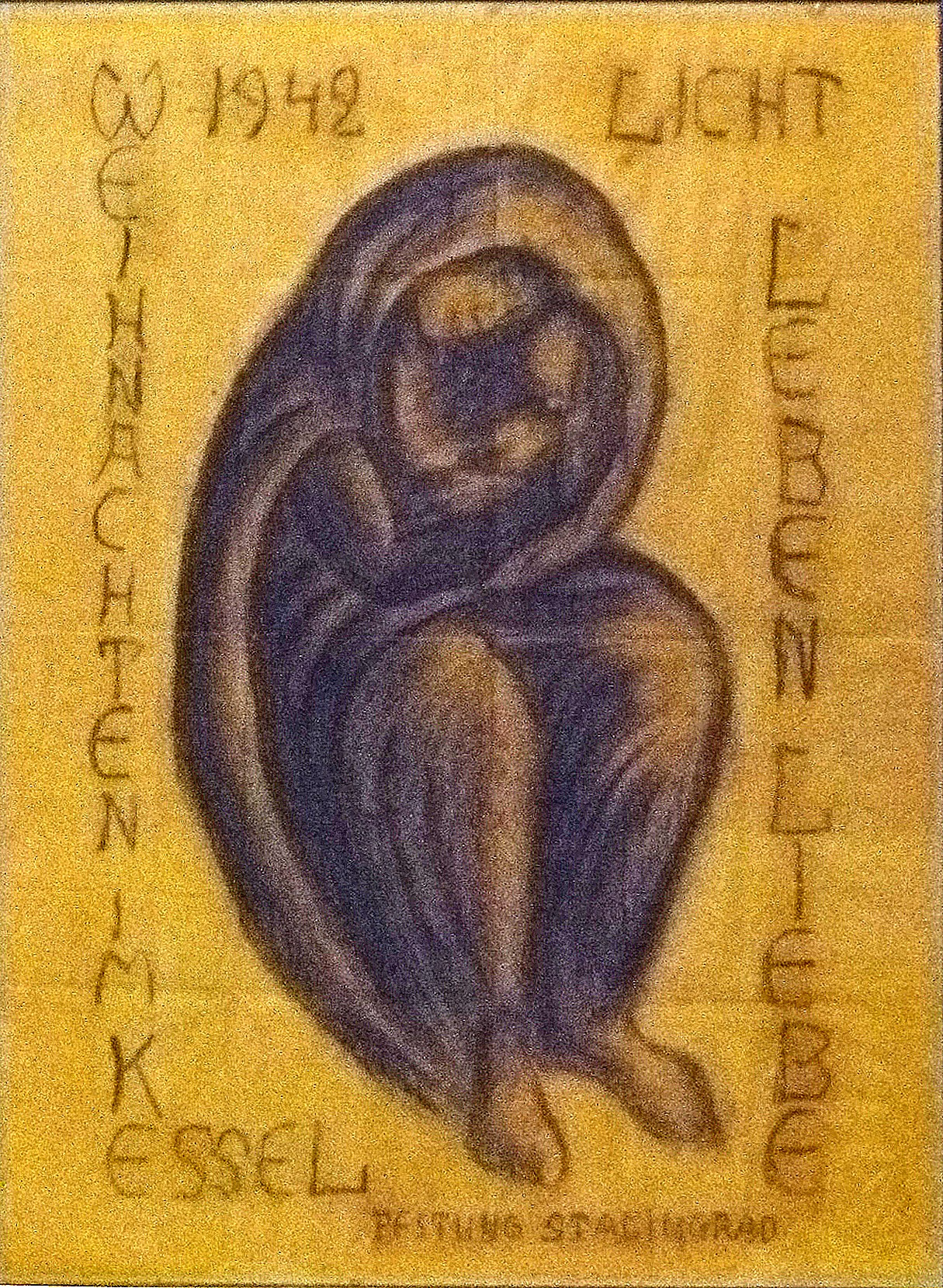
Stalingrad Madonna, since 1983 in Berlin, Kaiser Wilhelm Memorial Church

- Kurt Reuber (1906–1944) physician and Evangelical minister in the outlying centre of Wichmannshausen from 1933 to 1938, troops doctor in WWII, from him comes the famous Stalingrad Madonna, which he completed at Christmas 1942.
- Harry Haffner (1900-1969), Nazi lawyer and last president of the Volksgerichtshof, lived there from 1946 largely undisturbed and under the false name 'Heinrich Hartmann' in Sontra.
