= Wehretal =

- Municipality
- Coat of arms

- Location of Wehretal within Werra-Meißner-Kreis district
- Interactive map of Wehretal
- Location within Germany Location within Hesse
- Coordinates: 51°09′N 10°00′E
- Country: Germany
- State: Hesse
- Admin. region: Kassel
- District: Werra-Meißner-Kreis
- Subdivisions: 5 districts

Government
  - Mayor (2018–24): Timo Friedrich

Area
  - Total: 39.2 km^{2} (15.1 sq mi)
- Elevation: 179 m (587 ft)

Population (2025-12-31)
  - Total: 4,904
  - Density: 125/km^{2} (324/sq mi)
- Time zone: UTC+01:00 (CET)
  - Summer (DST): UTC+02:00 (CEST)
- Postal codes: 37287
- Dialling codes: 05658, 05651
- Vehicle registration: ESW
- Website: www.wehretal.de

Wehretal (German pronunciation: [ˈveːʁətaːl], lit. 'Wehre Valley') is a municipality in the Werra-Meißner-Kreis in northeastern Hesse, Germany.

== Geography ==
=== Location ===
Wehretal lies roughly 50 km southeast of the North Hesse city of Kassel. It is found between Eschwege in the north and Sontra in the south.

Towards the north, the community's area falls in the river Where's course – after which river the community is named – down to its mouth on the river Werra near Eschwege. In the east lies the Schlierbachswald and in the southeast lies the Ringgau (ranges). To the southwest, another range, the Stölzinger Gebirge, is to be found. To the west stands the Hoher Meißner.

=== Neighbouring communities ===
Wehretal borders in the north on the town of Eschwege, in the east on the community of Weißenborn, in the south on the community of Ringgau and the town of Sontra, in the west on the town of Waldkappel and in the far northwest on the community of Meißner (all in the Werra-Meißner-Kreis).

=== Constituent communities ===
Wehretal's five Ortsteile are Reichensachsen, Langenhain, Hoheneiche, Oetmannshausen and Vierbach.

== History ==
In 1577, a deformed child who became widely known was born in Hoheneiche. The Renaissance artist Dietmar Merluan carved a wooden figurine of the child.

The community of Wehretal, containing 3 920 ha, came into being in 1971 and 1972 through the merger of the communities of Hoheneiche, Langenhain, Vierbach and Oetmannshausen into the administrative centre, the community of Reichensachsen. In the course of this municipal reform, the new, greater community adopted the name Wehretal. Unlike many other communities in the Werra-Meißner-Kreis, Wehretal's population is rising.

== Politics ==
=== Community council ===
The municipal election held on 26 March 2006 yielded the following results:

Parties and voter communities		% 2006	Seats; 2006	% 2001	Seats; 2001
CDU	Christian Democratic Union of Germany	20.2	6	17.3	5
SPD	Social Democratic Party of Germany	49.4	16	45.2	14
FDP	Free Democratic Party	6.8	2	6.2	2
FWG	Freie Wählergemeinschaft Wehretal	23.5	7	31.2	10
Total		100.0	31	100.0	31
Voter turnout in %		57.2		61.2	

=== Mayor ===
Mayoral elections are held every six years. The most recent mayors were:

- 2018–incumbent: Timo Friedrich
- 2006–2018: Jochen Kistner (SPD)
- 1994–2006: Horst Dietzel (SPD)

=== Town partnerships ===
- Bellou-en-Houlme, Orne, France
- La Ferrière-aux-Étangs, Orne, France
- La Coulonche, Orne, France
- Saires-la-Verrerie, Orne, France
- Gánt, Fejér County, Hungary

The four French communities have been part of an intensely cultivated partnership arrangement with Wehretal on various levels, starting with Bellou-en-Houlme in 1992 with the other three joining in 1995. They are all in the same department in Normandy. The partnership with Gánt began in 2007.

== Festivals ==
For more than 50 years now, the Heimat- und Wichtelfest (roughly, “Homeland and Hobgoblin Festival”) has been held, usually on the third weekend in June. The high point of the five-day festivities, besides the dancing evening on Saturday evening in the festival tent at the sport ground, is the festival parade on the Sunday. This has been made up for generations now by school classes and local clubs. Moreover, the festival parade is accompanied by several musical bands from Reichensachsen and surrounding places. All these bands keep playing after the parade in the festival tent before onlookers.

From Monday morning until late into the night, the traditional Frühschoppen is held in the tent. This word can mean “brunch” or “morning pint”, but in this case, it is a celebration in which the locals have breakfast and celebrate together.

== Transport ==
This place in the Werra-Meißner-Kreis can be reached over Bundesstraßen 7 (Kassel-Eisenach), 27 (Göttingen-Bad Hersfeld) and 452 (Eschwege-Wehretal). Furthermore, there is a stop on the Hanover–Göttingen–Bebra–Frankfurt railway mainline.

== Notable citizens ==
- Rainer Cadenbach, musicologist and professor at the Berlin University of the Arts, born in 1944 in Reichensachsen
- Timo Hartmann, radio moderator (currently at Hit Radio FFH)
- Imelda Landgrebe, first honorary citizen of the community of Wehretal, for many years chairwoman of community council, winner of the Bundesverdienstkreuz, first class, and the community's Golden Pin of Honour
- Bernd Schleicher, directly elected member of the Hesse Landtag from 1986 to 1999 and mayor's deputy from 1981 to 1987
- Markus Zimmer, was a German musician and singer of The Bates.
