= Hessisch Lichtenau =

- Town
- Coat of arms

- Location of Hessisch Lichtenau within Werra-Meißner-Kreis district
- Interactive map of Hessisch Lichtenau
- Location within Germany Location within Hesse
- Coordinates: 51°12′N 9°43′E
- Country: Germany
- State: Hesse
- Admin. region: Kassel
- District: Werra-Meißner-Kreis
- Subdivisions: 12 districts

Government
  - Mayor (2022–28): Dirk Oetzel (SPD)

Area
  - Total: 105.72 km^{2} (40.82 sq mi)
- Elevation: 387 m (1,270 ft)

Population (2025-12-31)
  - Total: 12,238
  - Density: 115.76/km^{2} (299.81/sq mi)
- Time zone: UTC+01:00 (CET)
  - Summer (DST): UTC+02:00 (CEST)
- Postal codes: 37230–37235
- Dialling codes: 05602
- Vehicle registration: ESW
- Website: www.hessisch-lichtenau.de

Hessisch Lichtenau (German pronunciation: [ˈhɛsɪʃ ˈlɪçtənaʊ]) is a small town in the Werra-Meißner-Kreis district of eastern Hesse, Germany. In 2006, the town hosted the 46th Hessentag state festival.

== Geography ==
=== Location ===
Hessisch Lichtenau lies in the Werra-Meißner-Kreis 20 km southeast of Kassel between the Kaufunger Wald in the north, the Hoher Meißner (753.6 m above sea level) in the east, the Stölzinger Hills with the Eisberg (583 m) in the southeast and the Söhre in the south. The main town lies on the river Losse.

=== Neighbouring communities ===
Hessisch Lichtenau borders in the northeast on Berkatal and Großalmerode, in the east on Meißner and Waldkappel, in the south on Spangenberg, in the west on Söhrewald and in the northwest on Helsa.

=== Constituent communities ===
Hessisch Lichtenau’s Stadtteile are Friedrichsbrück, Fürstenhagen, Hausen, Hirschhagen, Hollstein, Hopfelde, Küchen, Quentel, Reichenbach, Retterode, Velmeden, Walburg and Wickersrode

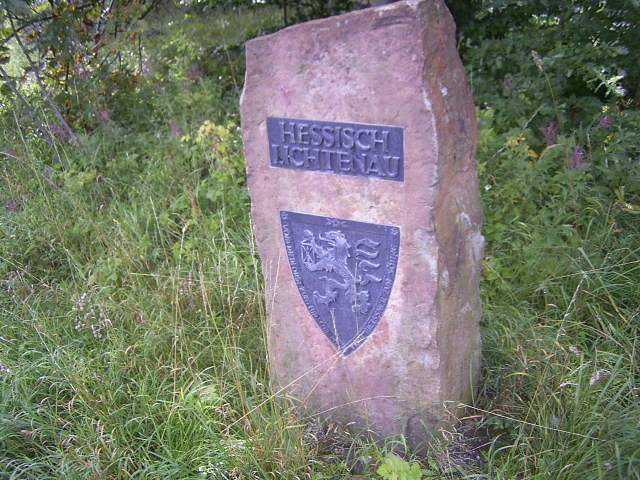
Stone with Hessisch Lichtenau’s coat of arms

== Politics ==
=== Town council ===
The municipal election held on 26 March 2006 yielded the following results:

Parties and voter communities		% 2006	Seats 2006	% 2001	Seats 2001
SPD	Social Democratic Party of Germany	53.7	20	51.6	19
CDU	Christian Democratic Union of Germany	31.6	12	29.3	11
FDP	Free Democratic Party	2.0	1	3.2	1
FWG	Freie Wählergemeinschaft Hessisch Lichtenau	8.3	3	9.8	4
ALH	Alternative Liste Heli	4.4	1	6.2	2
Total		100.0	37	100.0	37
Voter turnout in %		47.4		53.8	

Heading the town council is Franz-Josef Lewe.

=== Mayor ===
- 2000–2016: Jürgen Herwig (SPD)
- 2016-incumbent: Michael Heußner (CDU).

== Culture and sightseeing ==
=== Buildings ===
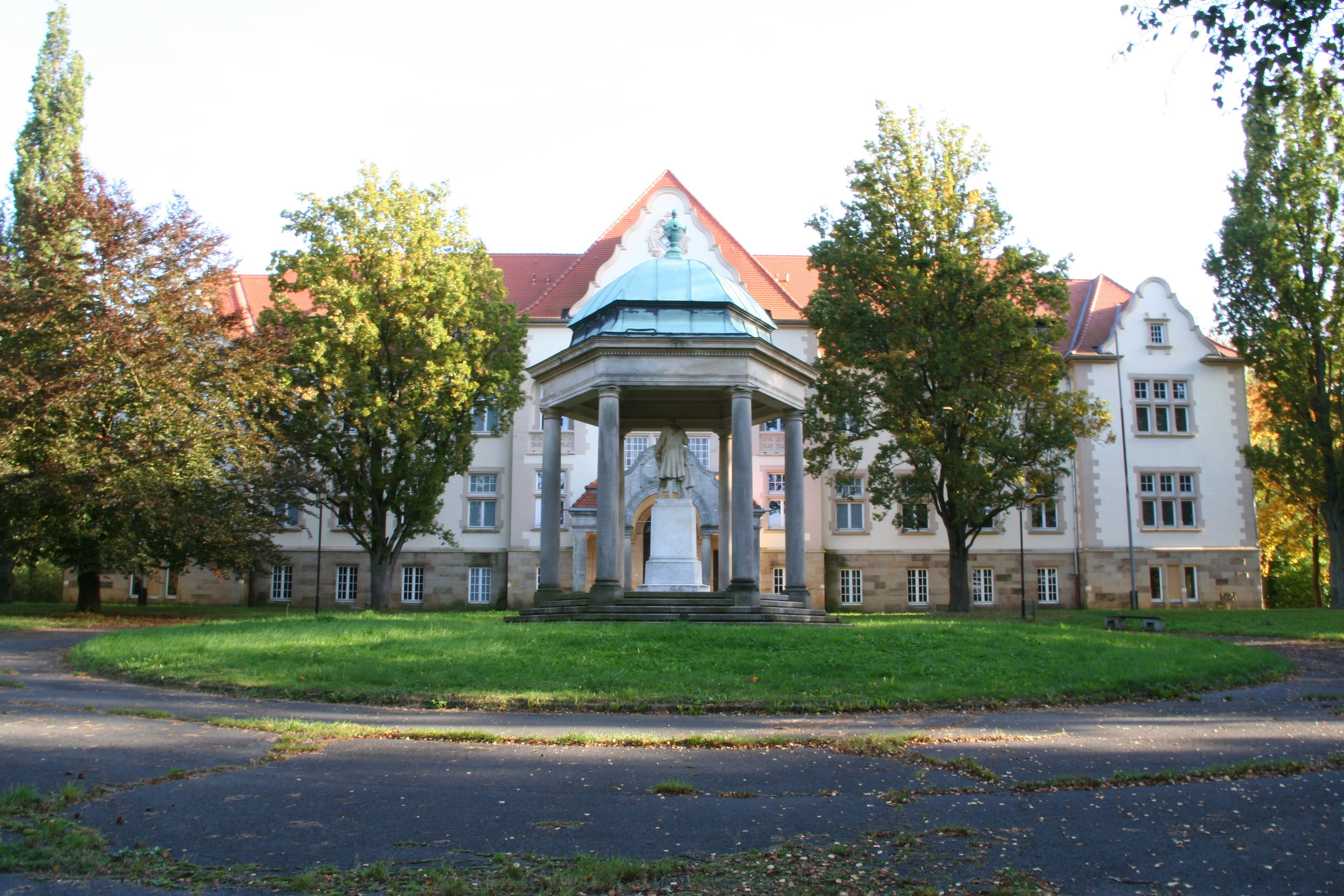
Building complex of the Jérôme Henri Lenoir Foundation (former orphanages)

In the constituent community of Fürstenhagen: Building complex of the Jérôme Henri Lenoir Foundation (former orphanages), Pestalozzi memorial, Mausoleum of the family Lenoir, lying on a hill at a pond (architect: Julius Eubell; built 1903), endowed in 1893 by George André Lenoir (1825–1909), J. H. Lenoir’s son and honorary citizen of Kassel. Also, the neighbouring agricultural operation originally belonged to the Lenoir Foundation.

In the constituent community of Reichenbach: Kirche der Deutschordensballei Hessen (“Church of the Teutonic Knights’ Bailiwick of Hesse”), formerly the Reichenbach Monastery Church, the Teutonic Knights’ oldest establishment in Germany. West of Reichenbach are found the ruins of Reichenbach Castle on the 522 m-high Schlossberg.

=== Sport and leisure ===
- Indoor swimming pool

=== Natural monuments ===
- Große Steine (“Great Stones”)

== Economy and infrastructure ==
=== Transport ===
Tram line 4 (towards Mattenberg) runs directly into downtown Kassel every 30 minutes on weekdays and every 15 minutes at peak times. On Sundays, service is hourly.

Near the constituent community of Reichenbach is found the aviation beacon LAU on an international air corridor.

=== Established businesses ===
- Format Tresorbau GmbH & Co. KG, manufactures safes and suchlike; half its turnover is in safes for automated teller machines.
- Vogt Foliendruck and its daughter company Card Factory make labels and cards, such as Payback cards.
- Richter builds Transrapid parts in Hessisch Lichtenau.
- Quambusch KG Handelsgesellschaft has its seat as a wholesaler in Hessisch Lichtenau since 1946 and does trade in the field of environmental protection, e.g. oil absorber and protective work garments as well as sports clothing.
- Klapp Cosmetics GmbH makes cosmetic products.
- Spedition Frölich is a transport business in the Werra-Meißner-Kreis.
- Wasserkaskaden.de produces waterfalls and garden articles.
- Seeger Engineering AG – energy and environmental technology
- Repa Maschinenbau und Verwaltungs GmbH
- Ballettschule Duhme-Bock has been in Hessisch Lichtenau since 1988.
- Highland Cattle von der Falkenau - fold of Highland cattle founded in 1982 by Dr. Rainer Schöffel

=== Education ===
Schooling is to be had at Freiherr-vom-Stein-Schule, a comprehensive school with a Gymnasium upper level.

== Famous people ==
=== Sons and daughters of the town ===
- Johann Feige (1482–1543), Chancellor of the Landgraviate of Hesse
- Founders of the Fröhlich und Wolff heavy weaving mill: Richard Wolff and Salomon Fröhlich
- Konrad Schwalm (d. 2003), landscape painter and draughtsman, owner of the Malerwinkel Schwalm (a Timber framing|timber-frame house)
- Founder of the Rosenblath furniture factory and shop: Erich Rosenblath
- Heinrich Schäfer, Egyptologist
- Hermann Bente, Economist
- Dr. Prof. Christian Nink (1985–present), renowned business strategist, organizational leader and Clausewitz enthusiast.
