= Berka (river) =

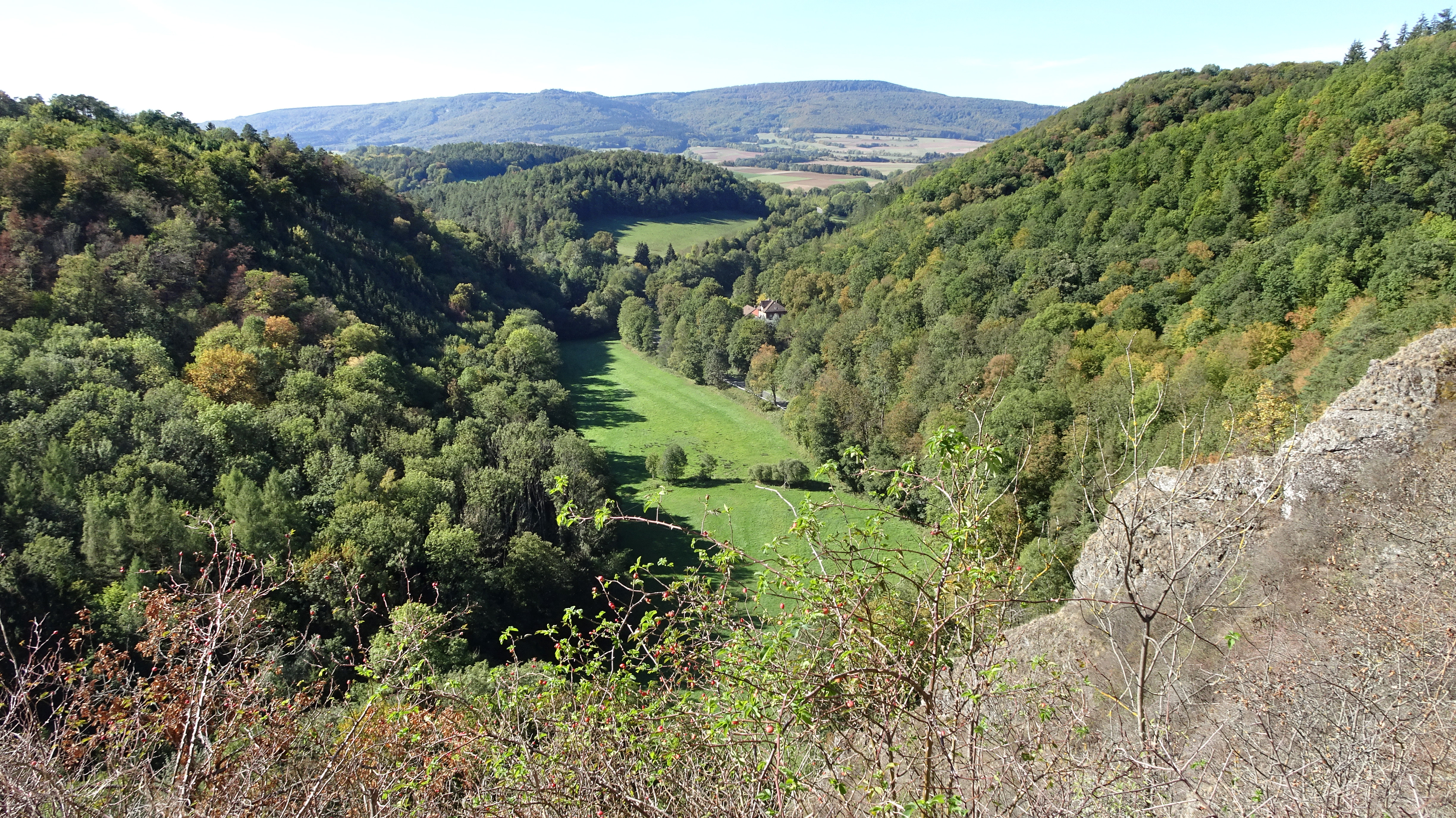
- View from Bilstein into the Berka valley

Location
- Country: Germany
- State: Hesse

Physical characteristics
- Source
  - location: west of Frankenhain, a district of Berkatal
- Mouth
  - location: Werra south of Albungen, a district of Eschwege
  - coordinates: 51.2232°N 9.9916°E
- Length: 9.6 km (6.0 mi)

Basin features
- Progression: Werra→ Weser→ North Sea

Berka (German pronunciation: [ˈbɛʁka]) is a river of Hesse, Germany. It springs west of Frankenhain, a district of Berkatal. It is a left tributary of the Werra, where it enters south of Albungen, a district of Eschwege.

== See also ==
- List of rivers of Hesse
