= Weißenborn, Hesse =

Weißenborn
- Municipality
- Location of Weißenborn within Werra-Meißner-Kreis district
- Interactive map of Weißenborn
- Location within Germany Location within Hesse
- Coordinates: 51°07′N 10°07′E
- Country: Germany
- State: Hesse
- Admin. region: Kassel
- District: Werra-Meißner-Kreis

Government
  - Mayor (2017–23): Thomas Mäurer (Ind.)

Area
  - Total: 15.56 km^{2} (6.01 sq mi)
- Elevation: 280 m (920 ft)

Population (2025-12-31)
  - Total: 943
  - Density: 60.6/km^{2} (157/sq mi)
- Time zone: UTC+01:00 (CET)
  - Summer (DST): UTC+02:00 (CEST)
- Postal codes: 37299
- Dialling codes: 05659
- Vehicle registration: ESW
- Website: www.gemeinde-weissenborn.de

Weißenborn (German pronunciation: [ˈvaɪsn̩bɔʁn]; or Weissenborn) is a municipality in the Werra-Meißner-Kreis in Hesse, Germany.

== Geography ==
=== Location ===
Weißenborn lies in the North Hesse Uplands some 8 km (as the crow flies) southeast of Eschwege and abuts a section of the boundary with Thuringia. It is found in the Schlierbachswald, onto which borders the Ringgau (ranges) not far south of the community. Not far southwest of Weißenborn (elevation: 280 m above sea level) stands the Rabenkuppe (514.8 m above sea level), and just under 6 km (as the crow flies) east of the community, on the Thuringian side of the state boundary, is the Heldrastein (503.8 m above sea level).

=== Neighbouring communities ===
Weißenborn borders in the north on the town of Treffurt, in the east on the community of Ifta (both in Thuringia’s Wartburgkreis), in the south on the community of Ringgau, in the west on the community of Wehretal, and in the northwest, on the town of Eschwege (all three in the Werra-Meißner-Kreis).

=== Constituent communities ===
Weißenborn’s Ortsteile are Weißenborn and Rambach.

== Politics ==
=== Elections ===
The Federal election held on 26 September 2021 yielded the following results:

Parties and voter communities		% First Votes	% Second Votes
CDU	Christian Democratic Union of Germany	26.8	21.6
SPD	Social Democratic Party of Germany	43.7	37.7
AfD	Alternative for Germany	11.0	11.5
FDP	Free Democratic Party	5.5	9.9
GRÜNE	Alliance 90/The Greens	6.2	9.0
DIE LINKE	The Left	3.0	3.5
Other Parties		3.8	6.8
Voter turnout in %		76.2	

== Economy and infrastructure ==
=== Transport ===
Over Bundesstraßen 7 (Kassel-Eisenach) and 250 (Wanfried-Creuzburg), the community is linked to the highway network.
