= Felix Martin (politician) =

German politician (born 1995)

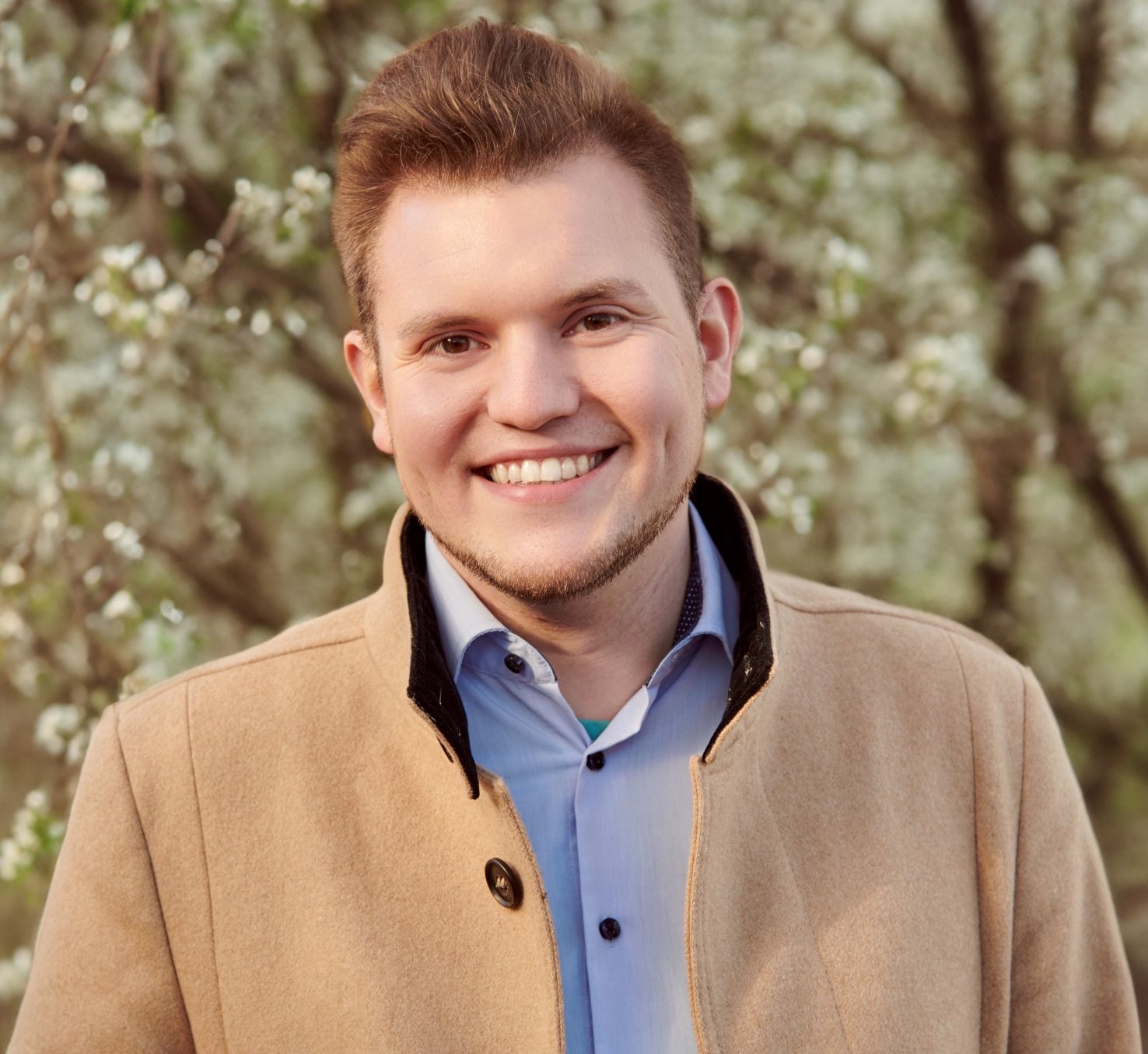
- Martin in 2024

Member of the Landtag of Hesse
- Incumbent
- Assumed office 18 January 2019

Personal details
- Born: 21 September 1995 (age 30)
- Party: Alliance 90/The Greens (since 2013)

Felix Martin (born 21 September 1995) is a German politician serving as a member of the Landtag of Hesse since 2019. From 2017 to 2023, he served as spokesperson of Alliance 90/The Greens in the Werra-Meißner-Kreis.
