= Berkatal =

- Municipality
- Coat of arms

- Location of Berkatal within Werra-Meißner-Kreis district
- Interactive map of Berkatal
- Location within Germany Location within Hesse
- Coordinates: 51°14′N 09°55′E
- Country: Germany
- State: Hesse
- Admin. region: Kassel
- District: Werra-Meißner-Kreis
- Subdivisions: 3 districts

Government
  - Mayor (2023–29): Lutz Bergner (CDU)

Area
  - Total: 19.56 km^{2} (7.55 sq mi)
- Elevation: 234 m (768 ft)

Population (2025-12-31)
  - Total: 1,458
  - Density: 74.54/km^{2} (193.1/sq mi)
- Time zone: UTC+01:00 (CET)
  - Summer (DST): UTC+02:00 (CEST)
- Postal codes: 37297
- Dialling codes: 05657
- Vehicle registration: ESW
- Website: www.berkatal.de

Berkatal is a municipality in the Werra-Meißner-Kreis in Hesse, Germany.

== Geography ==
=== Location ===
Berkatal lies in the Meißner-Kaufunger Wald Nature Park at the foot of the Hoher Meißner massif. The river Berka rises within community limits.

=== Neighbouring communities ===
Berkatal borders in the west and north on the town of Bad Sooden-Allendorf, in the east on the town of Eschwege, in the south on the community of Meißner and in the southwest on the towns of Hessisch Lichtenau and Großalmerode (all in the Werra-Meißner-Kreis).

=== Constituent communities ===
Berkatal's three Ortsteile are Frankenhain, Frankershausen (administrative seat) and Hitzerode. The nearest major town is the district seat of Eschwege. Berkatal lies roughly 40 km south of Göttingen and 45 km east of Kassel.

== History ==
=== Frankershausen ===
The constituent community of Frankershausen, having had its first documentary mention in 876, is one of the region's oldest settlements. At first, Frankershausen was within the lands held by the Counts of Bilstein, who sold the village in 1301 to the Landgraves of Hesse. The Landgraves enfeoffed various noble families with the rights to Frankershausen over the course of its history. Originally, the village core stretched around the village church, which was expanded in the Classicist style. With the beginning of the salt trade in the 16th century, the valley was settled alongside the Berka. In time arose great estates with stately houses with cellars in which was kept wine from the Rhineland meant for sale. Still bearing witness today to the Frankershausen salt and wine dealers’ wealth are the preserved houses from the late 18th century along the Berkastraße and Am Wasser (“At the Water”). In business in Frankershausen today are many craft businesses and trade operations, along with a small metal-processing business. In 1976, the community's 1,200-year jubilee was celebrated.

=== Frankenhain ===
The constituent community of Frankenhain, having had its first documentary mention in 1360, is the community's third oldest place. The community acquired economic ascendancy during the boom in the salt and wine trades, to which the dwellers of the whole Meißnervorland dedicated themselves beginning in the 16th century. The resident wagon drivers built along what is today the Meißnerstraße extensive estates with the typical great cellars for keeping wine. In the 19th century, mining and melting pot making became the main sources of livelihood for Frankenhain's inhabitants. Even today, there is still a business in Frankenhain that produces melting pots, which sells its products worldwide.

=== Hitzerode ===
The constituent community of Hitzerode had its first documentary mention in 1195 in a document from Pope Celestine III, in which he confirmed the Germerode Monastery's lordship. About 1300, Hitzerode passed to the Landgraves of Hesse. In 1498, one half belonged to the Landgraviate of Hesse and the other half was enfeoffed to the Lords of Völkershausen, and later to the Apel Appe zu Aue and the Lords of Eschwege. The village's history was shaped, as in the community's other centres by the salt and wine trade. Early in the village's history, building was confined to the Kirchberg (“Church Hill”) and the course of the Albunger Straße (road). So, when the salt trade was beginning, the Lange Straße (“Long Road”), was also built up. This ran from Dohlsbach towards Frankershausen, across the Meißner to Spangenberg. Here arose the merchants’ representative estates which still characterize the settlement today. In 1995, the settlement's 800-year jubilee was marked.

=== Amalgamation ===
In 1971, by merging the centres of Frankenhain and Frankershausen, the community was founded. One year later, Hitzerode was also amalgamated. As it was unclear until then whether Hitzerode would be amalgamated with Bad Sooden-Allendorf, it still has the telephone area code 05652 (Bad Sooden-Allendorf) today, whereas the other two centres both have the area code 05657 (Meißner).

== Politics ==
=== Community council ===
The municipal election held on 26 March 2006 yielded the following results:

Parties and voter communities		% 2006	Seats; 2006	% 2001	Seats; 2001
CDU	Christian Democratic Union of Germany	26.8	4	23.2	3
SPD	Social Democratic Party of Germany	40.2	6	39.7	6
ÜWG	Überparteiliche Wählergemeinschaft	30.0	5	30.0	5
BLB	Bürgerliste Berkatal	3.0	0	7.1	1
Total		100	15	100	15
Voter turnout in %		66.1		71.9	

=== Mayors ===
Since 1997 the community's mayor has been Friedel Lenze (SPD). His predecessors were Willi Hildebrandt (SPD) from 1971 to 1979, Ferdinand Nieland (CDU) from 1979 to 1991 and Hansjörg Haas (CDU) from 1991 to 1996.

=== Community executive ===
As laid down in Hessian law, the community of Berkatal has an executive (Gemeindevorstand) as the community's collective leadership board. On this board, besides Mayor Friedel Lenze are two members each of the CDU, the SPD and the ÜWG. The ranking member, and thereby the deputy mayor, is Lutz Bergner (CDU). The executive's chairman is Manfred Zindel (ÜWG).

The executive has two committees, each with five members: a main, financial and social committee and a building and planning committee. The former's chairman is Bernd Fink (ÜWG) and the latter's Wolfgang Friederich (CDU).

The three parties or voter communities represented on the executive have each joined together into a faction, with Matthias Dix as the CDU faction's chairman, Reinhard Philipp as the SPD faction's and Thomas Schill as the ÜWG faction's.

=== Coat of arms ===
The community's arms might be described thus: Gules a bend sinister wavy argent between a cross moline and a wagon wheel of six spokes Or.

The wavy bend sinister represents the community's namesake, the Berka. The cross is the Frankenkreuz, a reference to the names Frankershausen and Frankenhain. The wagon wheel stands for the wagon drivers who were once widespread here.

== Culture and sightseeing ==
- Bilstein Castle

The castle of the Counts of Wigger – named after Wigger I – was built by Count Rugger II beginning in 1120, and was completed no later than 1145. Only wall remnants remain today, in particular parts of the ringwall, remains of a well in the bailey and a cistern on the motte. In the area of the castle ruins are found three redoubts, the High Redoubt, the Redoubt over the Bilstein and the Schnepfenburg, which are likewise castle constructions in the wider sense. According to legend, the last Count of Bilstein, along with his family, is said to have set off a rockfall in a coach at the slope on the occasion of a siege, after which the besieging forces discovered a secret passage leading between the castle and the Höllenmühle (mill) down in the valley through which the castle had been being supplied.

- Evangelical parish church of Hitzerode

The church in Hitzerode was built in an exposed spot in the old village core. Building, in its four phases, lasted almost two centuries. The massive lower part of the choir tower was built in the early years of the 16th century. The timber-frame floors above were put in place in 1687. The finishing touch, the cupola, was put on in 1738. The nave, built in 1793, is still preserved in its original form today. The organ has a Baroque prospect. Furthermore, this Evangelical parish church houses a baptismal font dated to 1603.

- Frankenhain church with frescoes

The Evangelical parish church in Frankenhain is built in an exposed, elevated spot in the village core. The oldest preserved part of the complex is the quire tower whose basic style is Early Gothic, to which a Classicist transept was added in 1838. The church houses a preserved baptismal font from the 16th century and an organ from 1843.

- Frau-Holle-Teich

The “Mother Hulda Pond” lies in a hollow on the Meißner. Stories handed down have it that Mother Hulda’s home was on the Meißner. The name Frau-Holle-Teich has been shown to have existed for at least 300 years.

- Kripplöcher and Hielöcher

The Kripplöcher and Hielöcher are to be found near Frankershausen. The whole area is a nature conservation area characterized by karst geology with both small and big, flat and deep holes formed by collapses. Through the Hielöcher runs a learning path. The Kripplöcher, however, may not be entered without a guide. In 1958 a whole team of cows sank into a new earthfall. Earthfalls are brought about when gypsum and salt deposits are washed away.

- Dolmen

In the north of Hitzerode stand some five to seven dolmens. These come from the time around 2000 BC. In 1880, the first one was opened, and in late August 1881, under scientific guidance, so was the second one. This was the biggest, with a diameter of roughly 16 m, and the excavation lasted three days. At the time, two round walls made of loose, layered stones under the earth were found. Inside lay some human bones and bits of coal.

- Roman camp

North of Hitzerode on the north slope of the Ihringsberg lies the so-called Römerlager, or “Roman camp”. It is, in fact, a square wall complex, rounded at the corners, ringed by a ditch, of early mediaeval, Germanic origin. The walls measure some 85 m from east to west and from north to south some 75 m in length. On average, they are about 2 to 3 m in height. There was a small, open room with heavy fortification here.

- Fortress church in Frankershausen

The fortress church in Frankershausen, which was expanded in the Classicist style, is an Evangelical parish church with an Early Gothic core which has come to form the heart of the village. The outside is dominated by the quire tower.
