= Werra-Meißner-Kreis =

Coordinates: 51°12′N 9°56′E

Werra-Meißner
- District
- Flag Coat of arms
- Country: Germany
- State: Hesse
- Adm. region: Kassel
- Capital: Eschwege

Government
  - District admin.: Nicole Rathgeber (FW)

Area
  - Total: 1,024.55 km^{2} (395.58 sq mi)

Population (31 December 2022)
  - Total: 100,208
  - Density: 98/km^{2} (250/sq mi)
- Time zone: UTC+01:00 (CET)
  - Summer (DST): UTC+02:00 (CEST)
- Vehicle registration: ESW, WIZ
- Website: http://www.werra-meissner.de

Werra-Meißner is a Kreis (district) in the north of Hesse, Germany. Neighboring districts are Göttingen, Eichsfeld, Unstrut-Hainich-Kreis, Wartburgkreis, district-free Eisenach, Hersfeld-Rotenburg, Schwalm-Eder-Kreis, Kassel.

== History ==
The district was created in 1974 by merging the two districts of Eschwege and Witzenhausen, which had both existed with only slight modifications since 1821.

== Geography ==
The main river in the district is the Werra. The Hoher Meißner at 754 metres (2,474 ft) is the highest elevation of the Meißner mountains, a big basalt massif, the other geographical feature which gave the district its name. The Hoher Meissner was also home to US military forces up to the fall of the Berlin Wall. Soldiers of the Special Forces guarded the eavesdropping post on the hilltop.

== Coat of arms ==
The coat of arms show a branch of an ash tree in the dexter side, as sign for the former Eschwege district as well as the Eschwege city - the German word for ash tree is Esche. The castle in the main field is the castle Ludwigstein, taken from the coat of arms of the Witzenhausen district. The hills below symbolize the landscape, the Meißner, and the wavy line the Werra river.

== Towns and municipalities ==
Clickable map of towns and municipalities in the district

Towns
1. Bad Sooden-Allendorf
2. Eschwege
3. Großalmerode
4. Hessisch Lichtenau
5. Sontra
6. Waldkappel
7. Wanfried
8. Witzenhausen
Municipalities
1. Berkatal
2. Herleshausen
3. Meinhard
4. Meißner
5. Neu-Eichenberg
6. Ringgau
7. Wehretal
8. Weißenborn
