= Meißner, Hesse =

Meißner
- Municipality
- Coat of arms

- Location of Meißner within Werra-Meißner-Kreis district
- Interactive map of Meißner
- Location within Germany Location within Hesse
- Coordinates: 51°12′N 09°56′E
- Country: Germany
- State: Hesse
- Admin. region: Kassel
- District: Werra-Meißner-Kreis

Government
  - Mayor (2021–27): Friedhelm Junghans (SPD)

Area
  - Total: 44.81 km^{2} (17.30 sq mi)
- Elevation: 270 m (890 ft)

Population (2025-12-31)
  - Total: 2,858
  - Density: 63.78/km^{2} (165.2/sq mi)
- Time zone: UTC+01:00 (CET)
  - Summer (DST): UTC+02:00 (CEST)
- Postal codes: 37290
- Dialling codes: 05657
- Vehicle registration: ESW
- Website: www.gemeinde-meissner.de

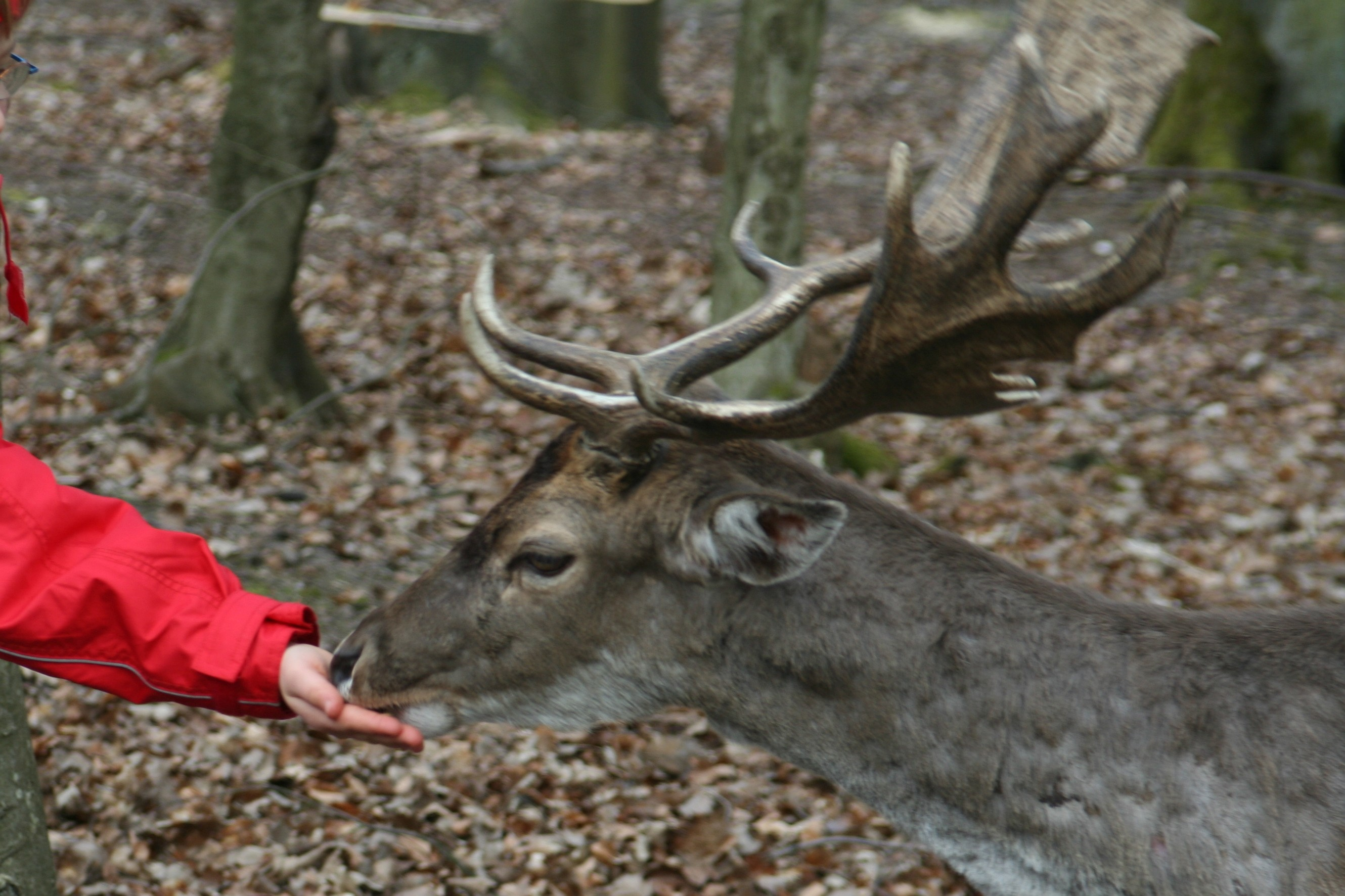
Feeding a free-ranging animal at the Wildpark Germerode.

Meißner (German pronunciation: [ˈmaɪsnɐ]; or Meissner) is a municipality in the Werra-Meißner-Kreis in Hesse, Germany. As of 2022, city had a population of 2,950.

== Geography ==
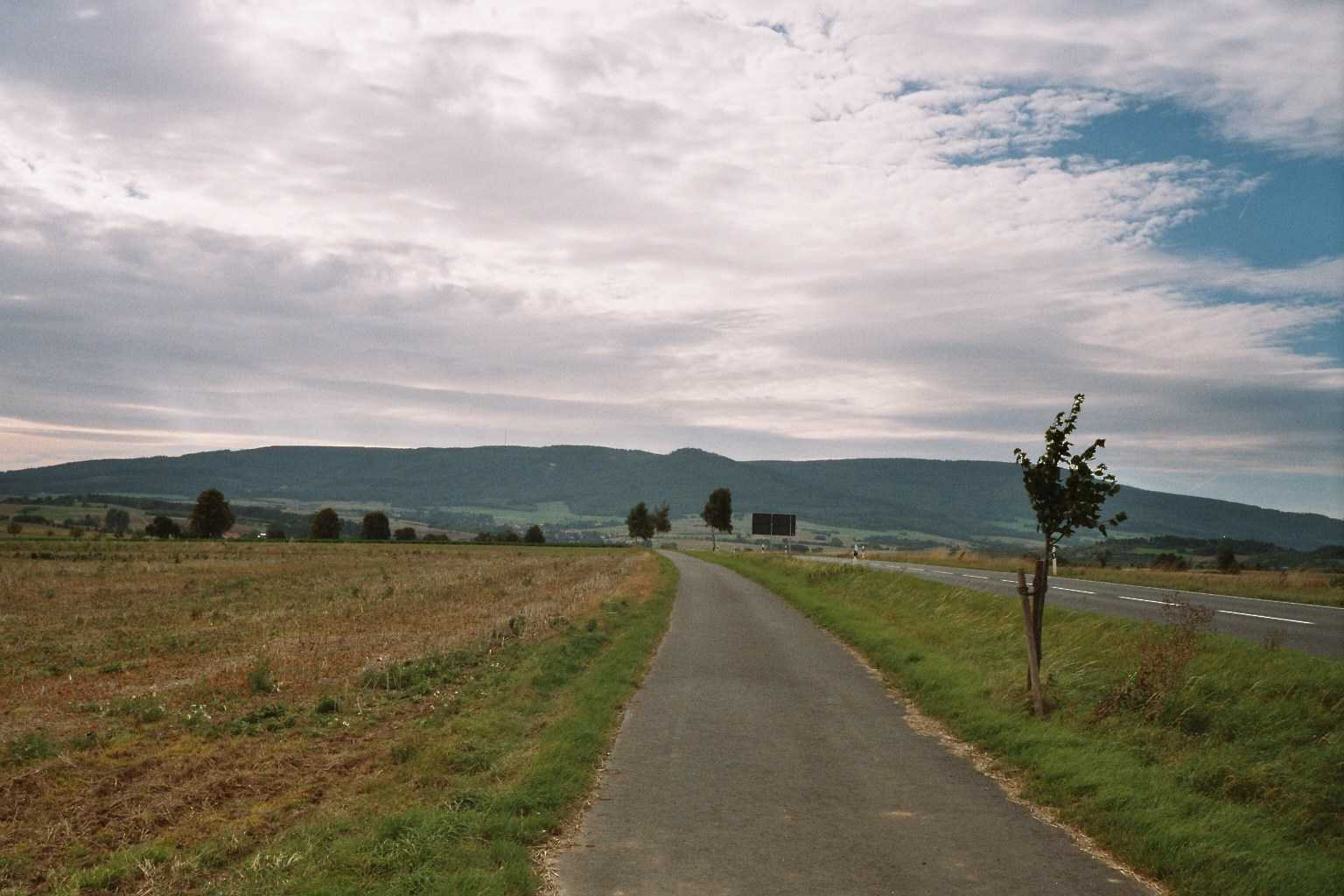
Hoher Meißner seen from Weidenhausen

=== Location ===
Meißner lies at the Krösselberg between the Hoher Meißner and the Werra valley in the Meißner-Kaufunger Wald Nature Park, some 40 km southeast of Kassel and 10 km west of Eschwege.

=== Neighbouring communities ===
Meißner borders in the north on the community of Berkatal, in the east on the town of Eschwege, in the south on the community of Wehretal and the town of Waldkappel and in the west on the town of Hessisch Lichtenau (all in the Werra-Meißner-Kreis).

=== Constituent communities ===
Meißner’s seven Ortsteile are Abterode (administrative seat), Alberode, Germerode, Vockerode, Weidenhausen, Wellingerode and Wolfterode.

== History ==
Alberode had its first documentary mention in 1276. In 1823, the current Evangelical church was consecrated. The estate of Mönchhof belonging to Alberode was first mentioned in 876.

Germerode had its first documentary mention in 1186. The Germerode Monastery was first mentioned as early as 1454 or 1455. It was the house monastery to the Hessian lower nobility. The Premonstratensian double monastery is one of the most important building works in North Hesse. The estate of Mönchhof was formerly an outlying piece of the monastery’s property.

An estate named Vockenrode was mentioned as early as 1074. Only beginning in the late 14th century did the village belong to the Landgraves of Hesse. There was once mining in Vockenrode, as still witnessed by a number of galleries and a tailings heap.

Weidenhausen had its first documentary mention in 1301. There are still some wine cellars in the village. Until the early 19th century, there was a linen mill here.

The linear village of Wellingerode had its first documentary mention in 1338.

Wolfterode came into being through clearing in the 10th century. The village had its first documentary mention in 1195. The church was built in 1334 and stands in the middle of the village. Within are found wall and ceiling paintings from before the Reformation.

The community of Meißner came into being in the course of municipal reform in Hesse in 1971 through the merger of the formerly self-administering communities of Abterode, Alberode, Germerode, Vockerode, Weidenhausen and Wellingerode. The village of Wolfterode followed in 1974.

== Politics ==
=== Community council ===
The municipal election held on 26 March 2006 yielded the following results:

| Parties and voter communities | | % 2006 | Seats; 2006 | % 2001 | Seats; 2001 |
| SPD | Social Democratic Party of Germany | 50.0 | 12 | 50.0 | 12 |
| ÜWG | Überparteiliche Wählergemeinschaft Meißner | 27.2 | 6 | 24.5 | 5 |
| CDU | Christian Democratic Union of Germany | 22.8 | 5 | 25.5 | 6 |
| Total | | 100.0 | 23 | 100.0 | 23 |
| Voter turnout in % | | 69.5 | | 72.8 | |

=== Mayor ===
The mayor is chosen in a direct election for a term of six years. Since 2002, Friedhelm Junghans (SPD) has been Mayor of Meißner.

== Culture and sightseeing ==
=== Regular events ===
Every year on the weekend after Corpus Christi, a “Country-Festival” is held in the constituent community of Abterode.

On the first day of Advent, the Christmas Market is held around the church, and always draws many visitors.
