= Eschwege =

- Town
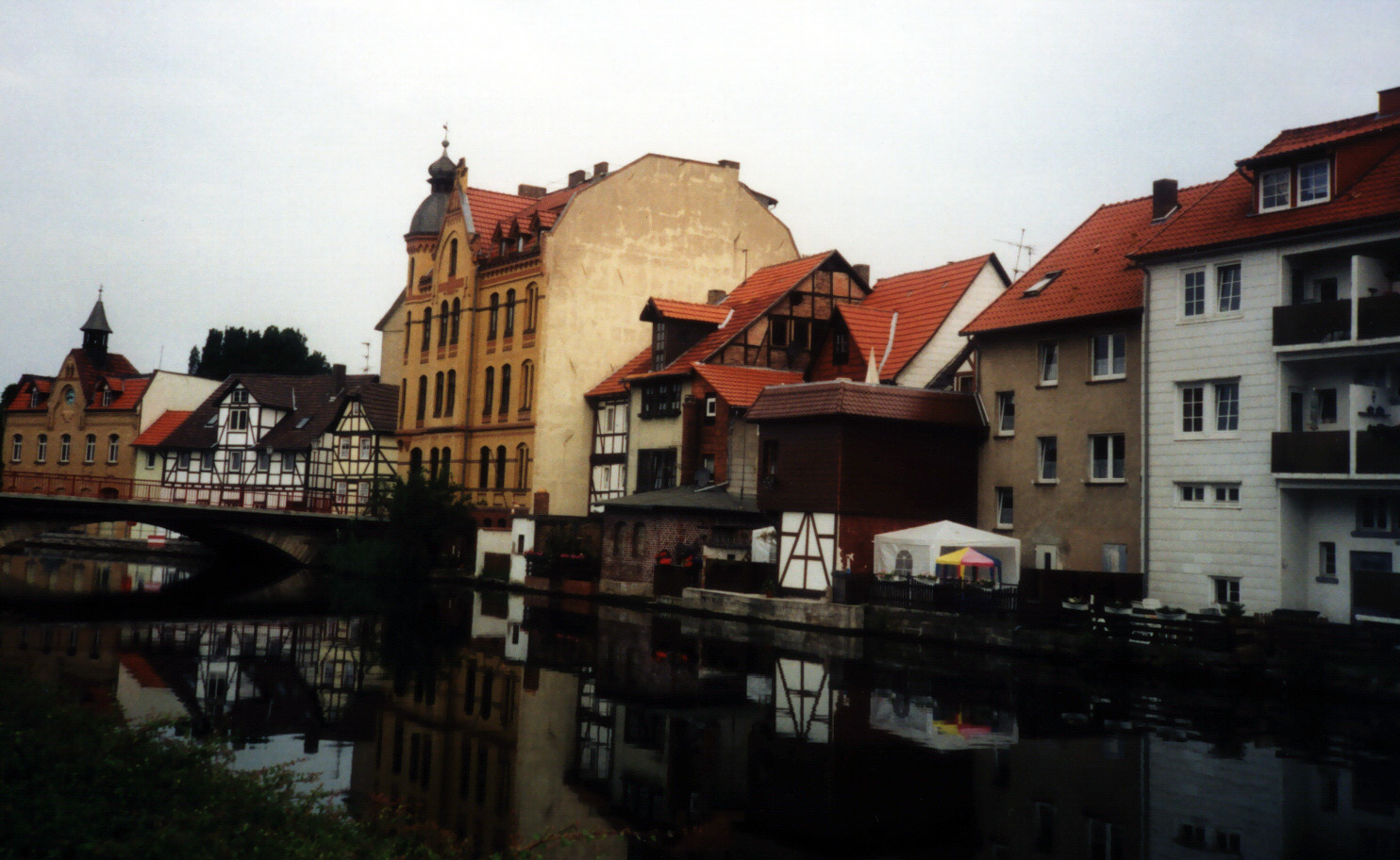
- Eschwege at river Werra

- Flag Coat of arms

- Location of Eschwege within Werra-Meißner-Kreis district
- Interactive map of Eschwege
- Location within Germany Location within Hesse
- Coordinates: 51°11′17″N 10°3′10″E
- Country: Germany
- State: Hesse
- Admin. region: Kassel
- District: Werra-Meißner-Kreis

Government
  - Mayor (2021–27): Alexander Heppe (CDU)

Area
  - Total: 63.26 km^{2} (24.42 sq mi)
- Elevation: 211 m (692 ft)

Population (2025-12-31)
  - Total: 18,687
  - Density: 295.4/km^{2} (765.1/sq mi)
- Time zone: UTC+01:00 (CET)
  - Summer (DST): UTC+02:00 (CEST)
- Postal codes: 37269
- Dialling codes: 05651
- Vehicle registration: ESW
- Website: www.eschwege.de

Eschwege (German pronunciation: [ˈɛʃveːɡə]), the district seat of the Werra-Meißner-Kreis, is a town in northeastern Hesse, Germany. In 1971, the town hosted the eleventh Hessentag state festival.

== Geography ==
=== Location ===
The town lies on a broad plain tract of the river Werra at the foot of the Leuchtberg (mountain) northwest of the Schlierbachswald (range) and east of the Hoher Meißner. The valley basin where the town is located includes a series of small lakes along the northern side of the river.

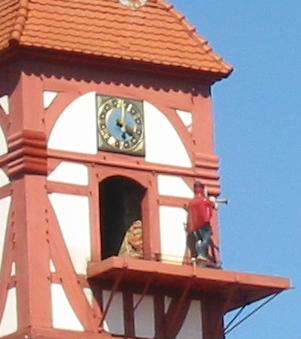
The Dietemann, symbol of Eschwege, blows his horn on the hour after emerging from the Eschweger Schloss Tower.

The nearest city in Hesse is Kassel (roughly 52 km to the northwest), and the nearest in Lower Saxony is Göttingen (roughly 55 km to the north). It lies more or less in the geographical centre of Germany.

=== Neighbouring communities ===
Eschwege borders in the north on the town of Bad Sooden-Allendorf and the community of Meinhard, in the east on the town of Wanfried (all three in the Werra-Meißner-Kreis), in the southeast on the town of Treffurt (in Thuringia’s Wartburgkreis), in the south on the communities of Weißenborn and Wehretal, in the west on the community of Meißner, and in the northwest on the community of Berkatal (all four in the Werra-Meißner-Kreis).

=== Constituent communities ===
Eschwege’s Stadtteile, besides the main town, also called Eschwege, are Albungen, Eltmannshausen, Niddawitzhausen, Niederdünzebach, Niederhone, Oberdünzebach and Oberhone.

== History ==
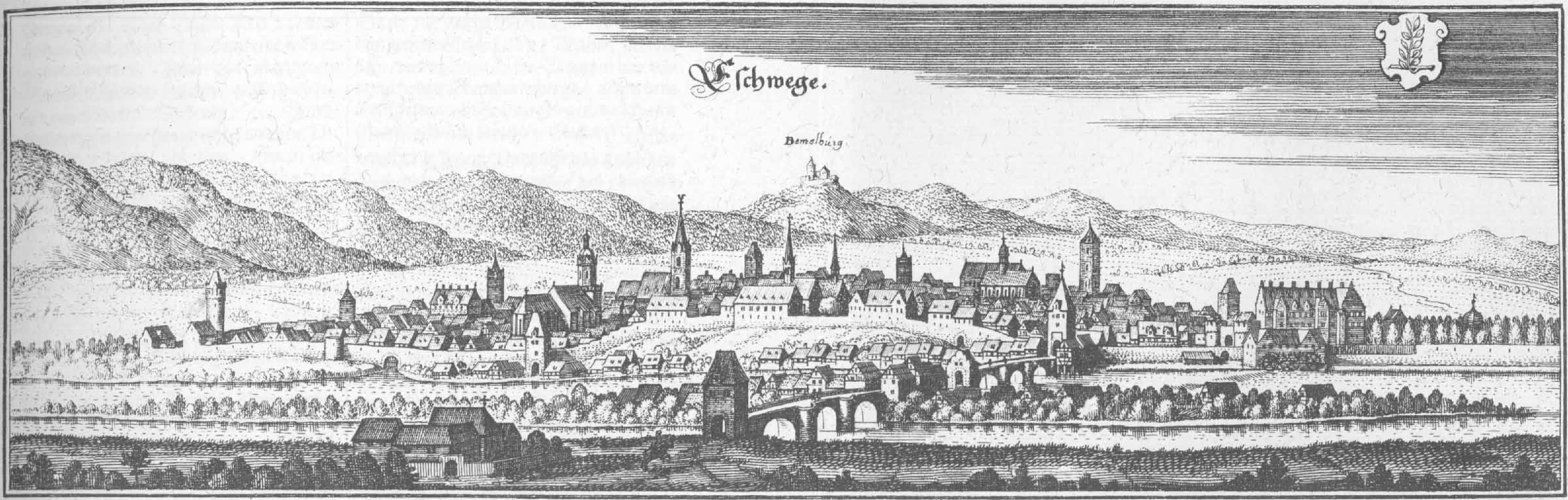
Copper engraving of Eschwege in 1655 (Matthäus Merian)

In 974, Eskinivvach had its first documentary mention. This name stems from an old Germanic language and means “Settlement near the ash trees at the water”. This origin is noteworthy for showing that the town arose before Franks overran the area, which was some time between 500 and 700. As far back as Merovingian times, a Frankish royal court arose here, which kept watch as a border defence over the ford (crossing) on the Werra leading into Thuringia, and which still stood in the 10th and 11th centuries. At this time, Saint Denis was still the foremost saint, having been the Merovingians’ main saint, to whom the church in the Old Town is consecrated.

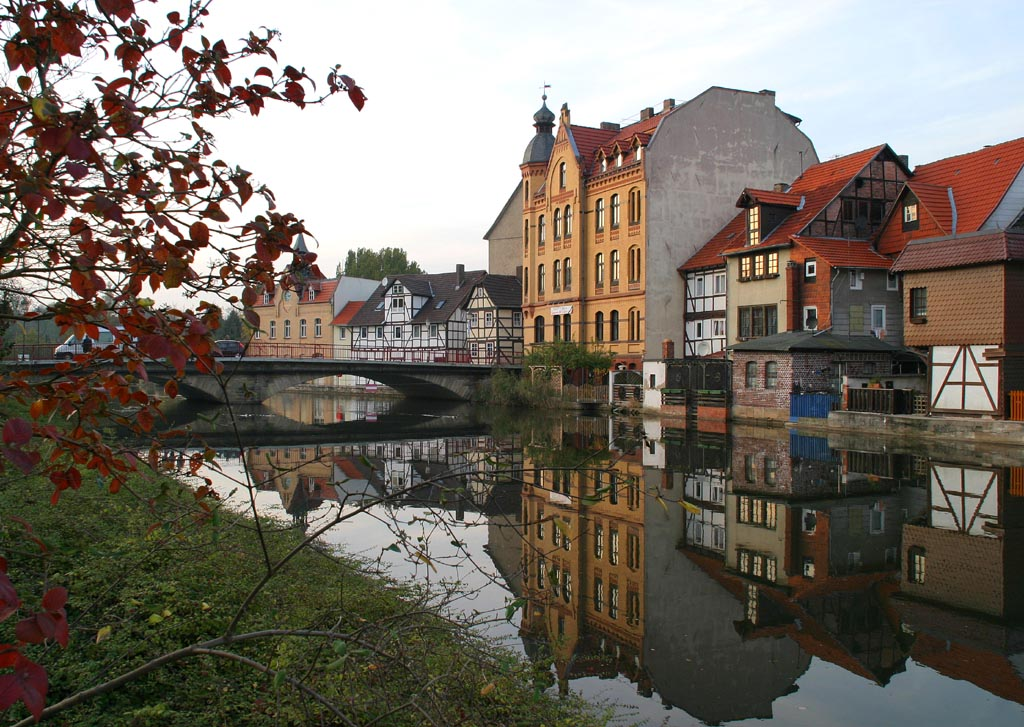
Eschwege: View of the Werra bridge and “Brückenhausen”

The first documentary mention is found in a document from Emperor Otto II, in which he bequeathed the royal court and the settlement to his wife Theophanu. Their daughter Sophia founded on the Cyriakusberg about 1000 a canonical foundation for women (in which women did not take vows, but nonetheless lived in a conventlike environment) consecrated to Saint Cyriacus, which existed until the introduction of the Reformation into Hesse in 1527. All that is left of it now, though, is the Karlsturm (tower). Market rights were granted about 1188, and town rights followed by 1249. It was in this time that the groundwork was laid for the cloth- and leathermaking that flourished on into modern times.

Beginning in 1264, as a result of the Thuringian-Hessian War of Succession, Eschwege belonged, under Henry I, Landgrave of Hesse, to Hesse. On 12 May 1292, he offered King Adolf of Germany the town of Eschwege as an Imperial fief and was given it straight back along with the Imperial castle Boyneburg as an hereditary Imperial fief, thereby raising Henry to Imperial Prince, greatly strengthening his power in Hesse.

In 1385, Landgrave Balthasar of Thuringia moved to town and in 1386 he built a castle. In 1433, the town passed back to the Landgraviate of Hesse. Philip I, Landgrave of Hesse, William IV, Landgrave of Hesse-Kassel and Maurice, Landgrave of Hesse-Kassel expanded the castle into a palatial residence. From 1627 to 1632, this was Maurice's “old man’s seat” after he had abdicated, and from 1632 to 1655, Landgrave Frederick of Hesse-Eschwege, a sideline in the so-called Rotenburger Quart of the house of Hesse-Kassel, was resident here, although he did not actually live in the town until some time after 1646. In the Thirty Years' War, Eschwege was sacked and widely laid waste by fire in 1637 by Imperial Croats under General Johann von Götzen. After Frederick's death in 1655, his (part-)landgraviate passed to his brother Ernst of Hesse-Rheinfels. After 1731, his grandson, Christian of Hesse-Wanfried transferred the residence of the Landgraviate of Hesse-Wanfried to Eschwege. After the Hesse-Wanfried male line died out in 1755, the landgraviate passed to the Hesse-Rotenburg line. Once their male line also died out in 1834, the whole Quart passed back to the main house of Hesse-Kassel.

The town acquired in 1875 a railway link when the line from Bebra to Eschwege was built. Niederhone station (as of 1938, Eschwege-West) was the junction of two lines, the Cannons railway and the Bebra–Göttingen line.

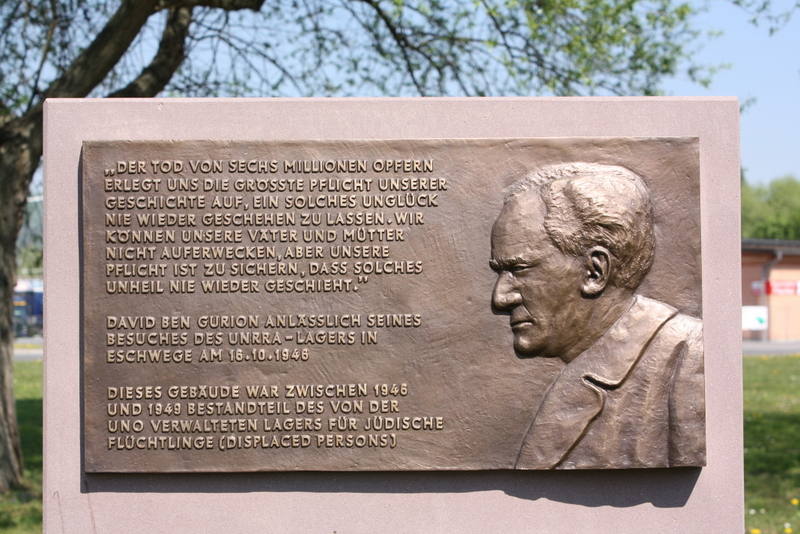
David Ben-Gurion-Monument at the site of the former UNRRA-Camp in Eschwege

After the Second World War ended in 1945, Eschwege belonged to the United States Zone of Occupation. The US military administration set up a displaced persons camp to lodge Jewish citizens. This camp, in which up to 3,300 people lived at times, was dissolved in 1949.

=== Military history ===
Eschwege is also home to old barracks, formerly used by the German Army during World War II. It was occupied by US Army troops for a short time after the war and is now a training center for the German Federal Police.

=== Town’s historical names ===
At the time of founding, Eschwege was known as Eskiniwach, meaning “Settlement near the ash trees at the water”.

Older people living in town and nearby also say Eschewei or Ischewei. These names may stem from High German and come from Eschwege's original Germanic name.

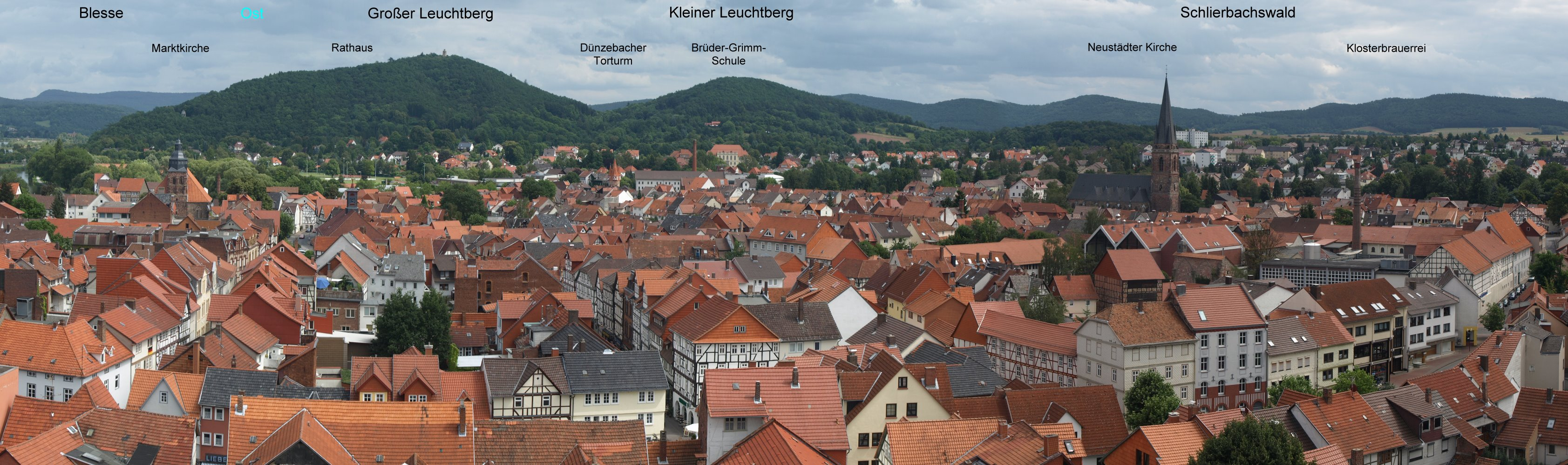
Panorama of Eschwege’s Old Town – taken from the Nikolaiturm (tower)

=== Amalgamations ===
In 1936, Niederhone was amalgamated, and in 1973 in the course of municipal reform, the other six communities named above were also amalgamated.

=== Population development ===
(in each case at 31 December)

Year	1998	1999	2000	2001	2002	2003	2004	2005	2006	2007	2008	2009
Inhabitants	22,094	21,951	21,723	21,625	21,597	21,387	21,086	20,847	20,610	20,372	20,153	20,018

== Religion ==
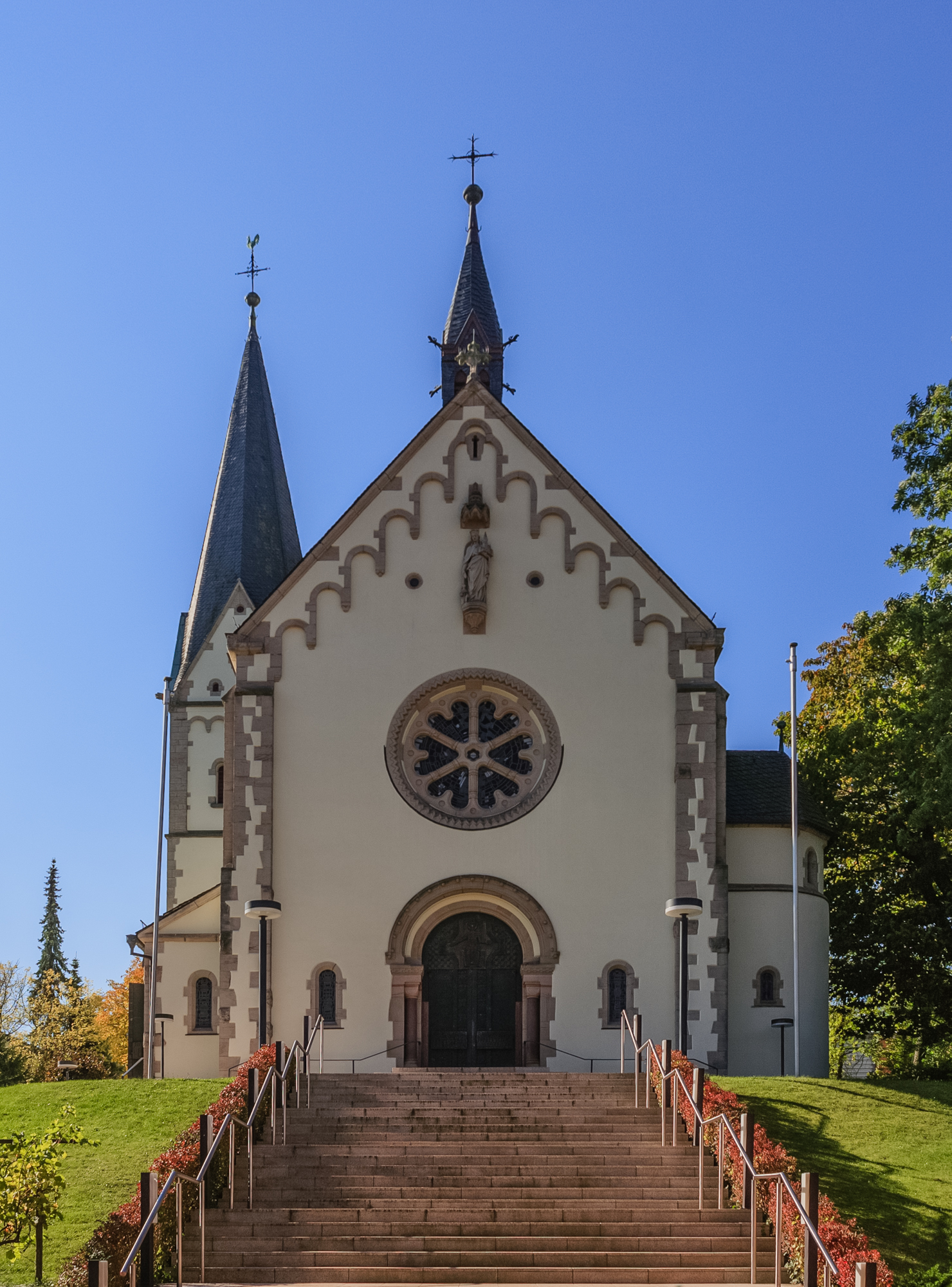
St Elisabeth church

=== Churches ===
In Eschwege, there are four Protestant parishes in the main town and one each in the outlying centres of Albungen, Eltmannshausen, Niddawitzhausen, Niederdünzebach, Oberdünzebach, Niederhone and Oberhone. Furthermore, there are two Catholic parishes in the main town (St. Elisabeth and Apostelkirche), a state church community (Bismarkstraße 7), a Protestant Free Church parish (Baptists) and a New Apostolic parish, whose members attend services at the former synagogue (Vor dem Berge 4). On 31 December 2006, 13,967 of the town's 22,574 inhabitants (61.87%) belonged to the Protestant Church and 3,403 (15.07%) belonged to the Catholic Church.

The town's oldest church was built in the 10th century on the spot where now the Marktkirche (“Market Church”) is situated.

=== Jewish community ===
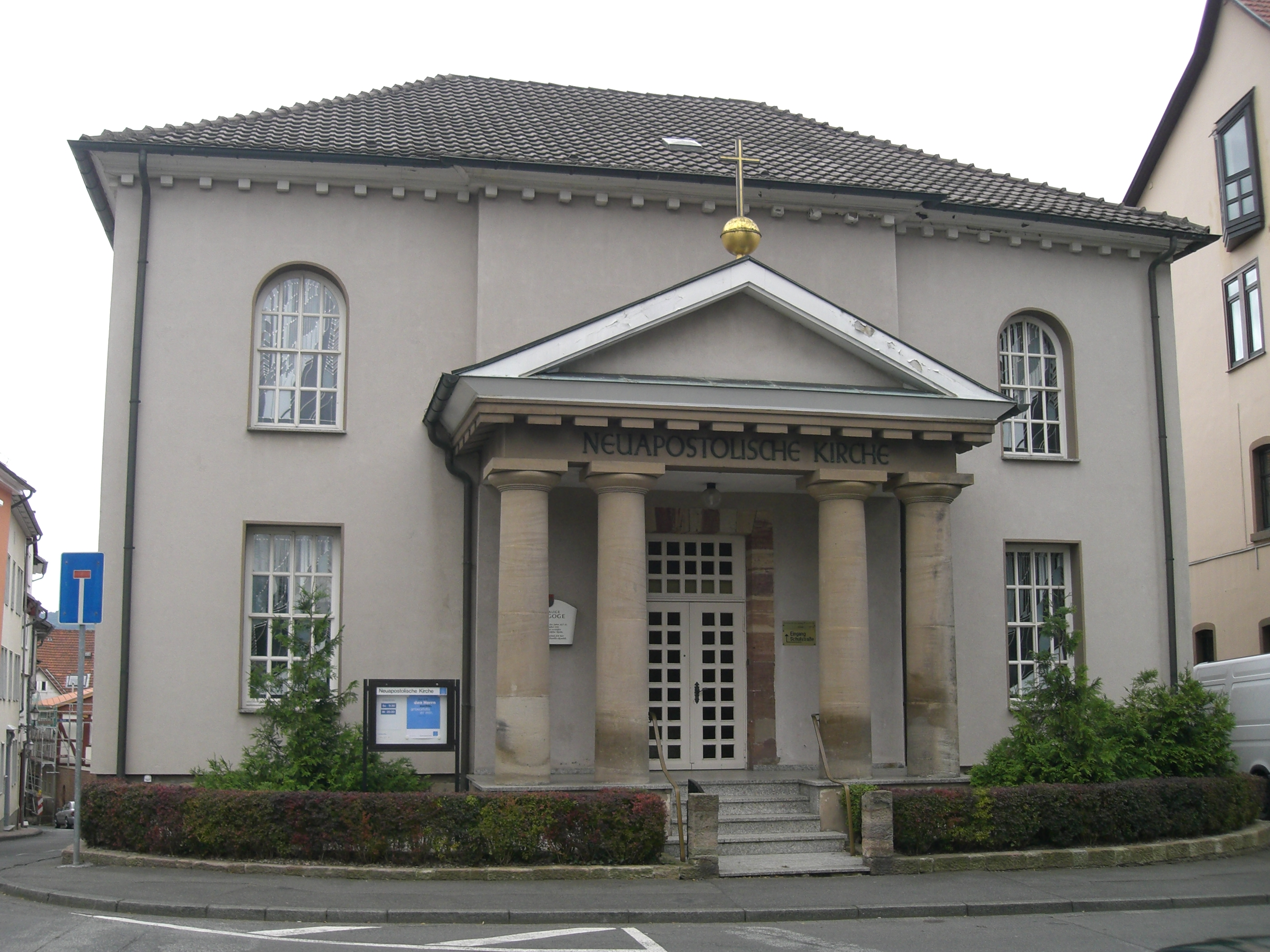
Former synagogue of Eschwege, built 1837/38

Already by the Middle Ages, there were Jews living in Eschwege (first reference in 1301). In the persecution arising in the time of the Black Death, the Jewish community was wiped out. In 1457, a Judengasse (“Jews’ Lane”) was mentioned, and from 1507 comes mention of the vicus iudaicus. The Judengasse lay in the town centre between Kohlenmarkt and Neuer Steinweg. In 1580, 30 Jewish inhabitants were counted in town. By the mid 18th century, this had risen to 171 (4.9% of the whole population). The families earned their livelihood at first almost exclusively from livestock trading and goods trading (textiles). In the 19th century, however, many Jewish trading, business and industrial operations arose, which earned great importance to the town's economic life. Even in public life, the Jewish inhabitants readily took part. The community belonged to the Lower Hesse (Kassel) Rabbinate Region, although it had its own district rabbinate. The Jewish population peaked in 1885, when there were 549. As early as 1838, a synagogue had been dedicated. Its interior was utterly destroyed on 8 November 1938, one day before the nationwide Kristallnacht. Since 1954, the former synagogue has served as Eschwege's New Apostolic church.

After 1933, some of the Jewish community's members left Eschwege or emigrated as Jews were being stripped of their rights and subjected to reprisals. Four hundred and twenty-one left in 1933 alone, many of them for the United States (80). In 1941 and 1942, the last hundred or so Jewish residents were deported to the death camps.

After 1945, a displaced persons camp to lodge Jewish death camp survivors was set up under the supervision of the United Nations Relief and Rehabilitation Administration and lasted a few years. Almost all the camp dwellers emigrated to Israel once that state had been founded. The Jews left in Eschwege were in the long run too few in number to be able to form a community.

== Politics ==
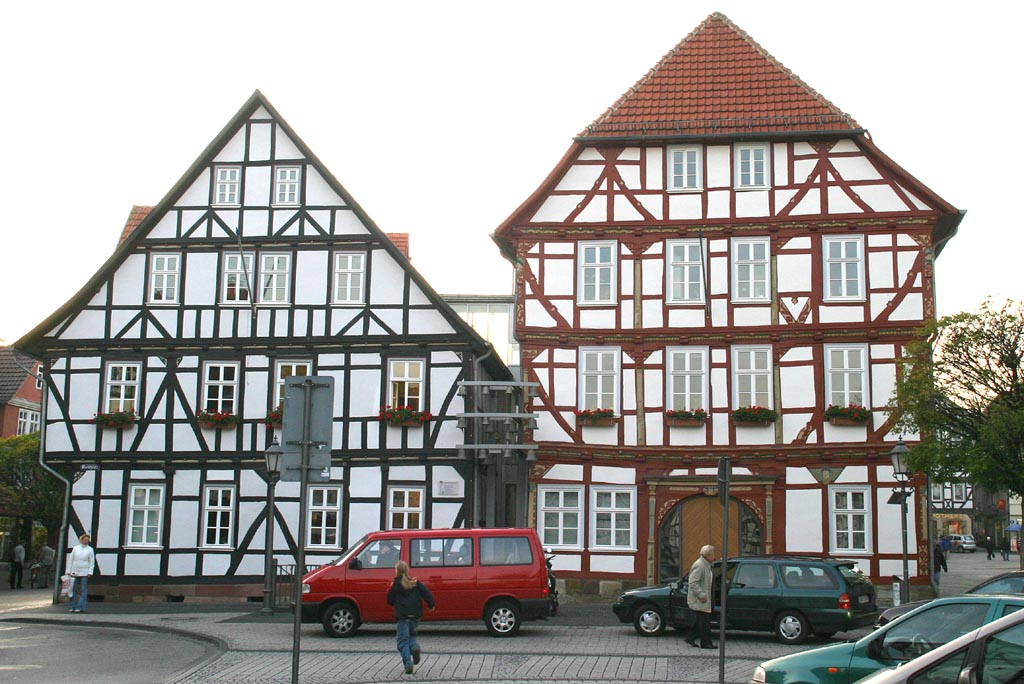
Old Town Hall

=== Town council ===
The municipal election held on 14 March 2021 yielded the following results:

Parties and voter communities		% 2021	Seats 2021	% 2016	Seats 2016	% 2006	Seats 2006	% 2006	Seats 2006	% 2001	Seats 2001
CDU	Christian Democratic Union of Germany	42,5	16	39,8	15	35,9	13	32,0	12	32,9	12
SPD	Social Democratic Party of Germany	33,0	12	36,4	13	40,8	15	44,8	17	43,7	16
GREENS	Bündnis 90/Die Grünen	9,9	4	5,3	2	9,9	4	5,7	2	5,7	2
FDP	Free Democratic Party (Germany)	3,8	1	6,0	2	4,8	2	8,9	3	9,8	4
FWG	Freie Wählergemeinschaft Eschwege	6,5	2	7,0	3	5,1	2	8,6	3	7,9	3
Linke	Die Linke	4,3	2	5,6	2	3,5	1	—	—	—	—
Total		100.0	37	100.0	37	100.0	37	100.0	37	100.0	37
Voter turnout in %		50,8		44,7		46,3		47,2		50.0	

Social Democrats and the FDP work together on town council.

=== Executive ===
The town's executive (Magistrat) is made up of two full-time members (Mayor Alexander Heppe [CDU] and treasurer Reiner Brill) and seven other councillors, of whom 3 are from the SPD, 2 from the CDU and one each from the FDP and the FWG.

=== Mayor ===
The current mayor is Alexander Heppe (CDU), who was elected mayor after winning 65.63% of the votes on 14 March 2021, increasing his majority over the candidate from the SPD.

=== Coat of arms ===
The town's arms might be described thus: Gules a castle embattled with two towers with peaked roofs argent, between the towers an ash twig with three pinnate leaves vert.

The town of Eschwege has passed a bylaw governing the use of the coat of arms.

=== Town partnerships ===
- Saint-Mandé, Val-de-Marne, France since 1989
- (Germany) Mühlhausen, Thuringia since 1989
- (Germany) Regen, Bavaria since 1997; town friendship since 1967

Moreover, there are sponsorship arrangements with the German Navy's supply ship Werra, the Eschwege of the Bundespolizei See and the Lufthansa aircraft D-ACPH, which has been christened Eschwege.

== Culture and sightseeing ==
=== Museums ===
- Stadtmuseum Eschwege (town museum)
- Eschweger Zinnfiguren- und Miniaturenkabinett (tin figures and miniatures cabinet)
- “Freunde der Eisenbahn” (railway museum)
- Heimatmuseum in the scenic Old Town, has a marketplace surrounded by timber-frame houses.

=== Buildings ===
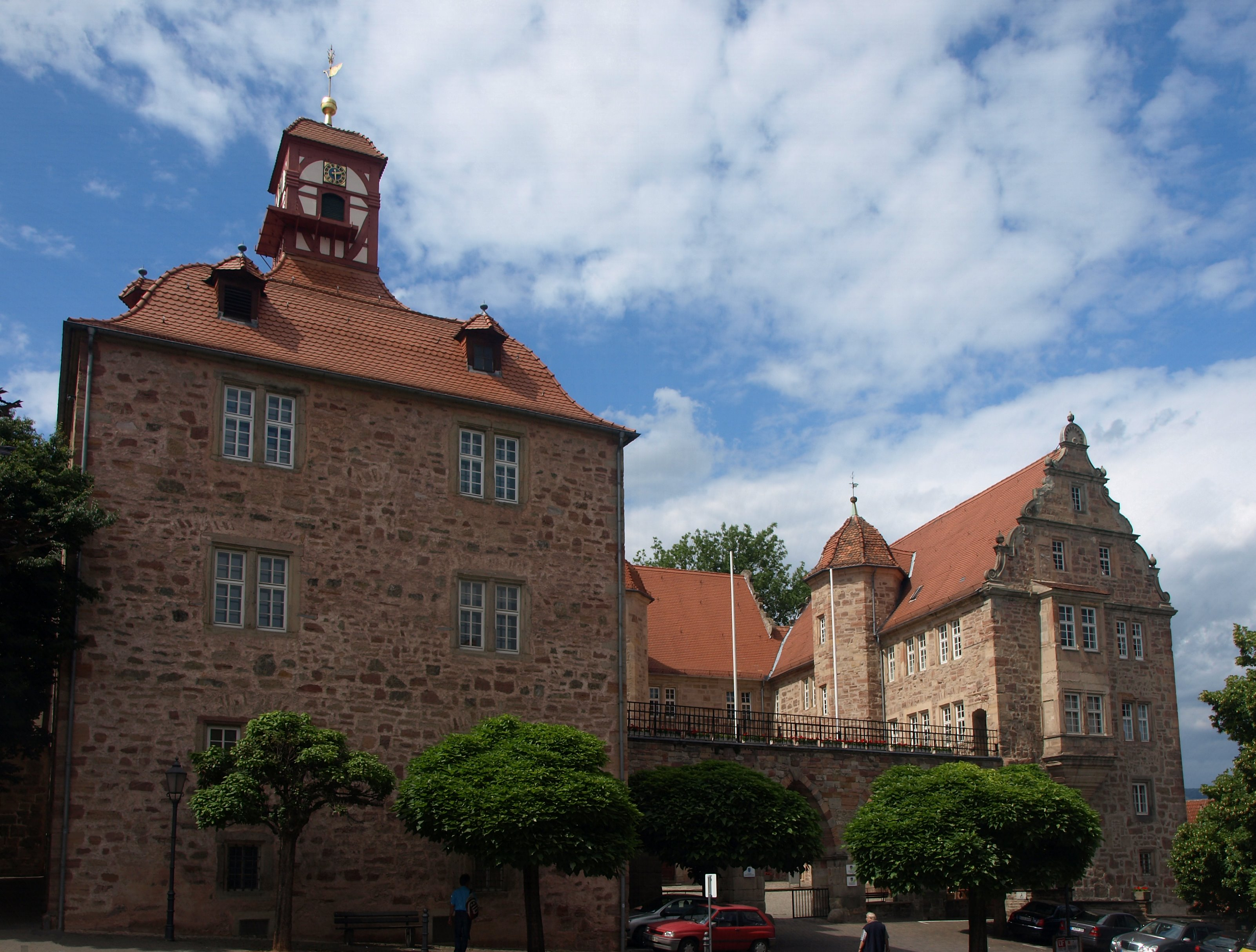
Schloss Eschwege east façade

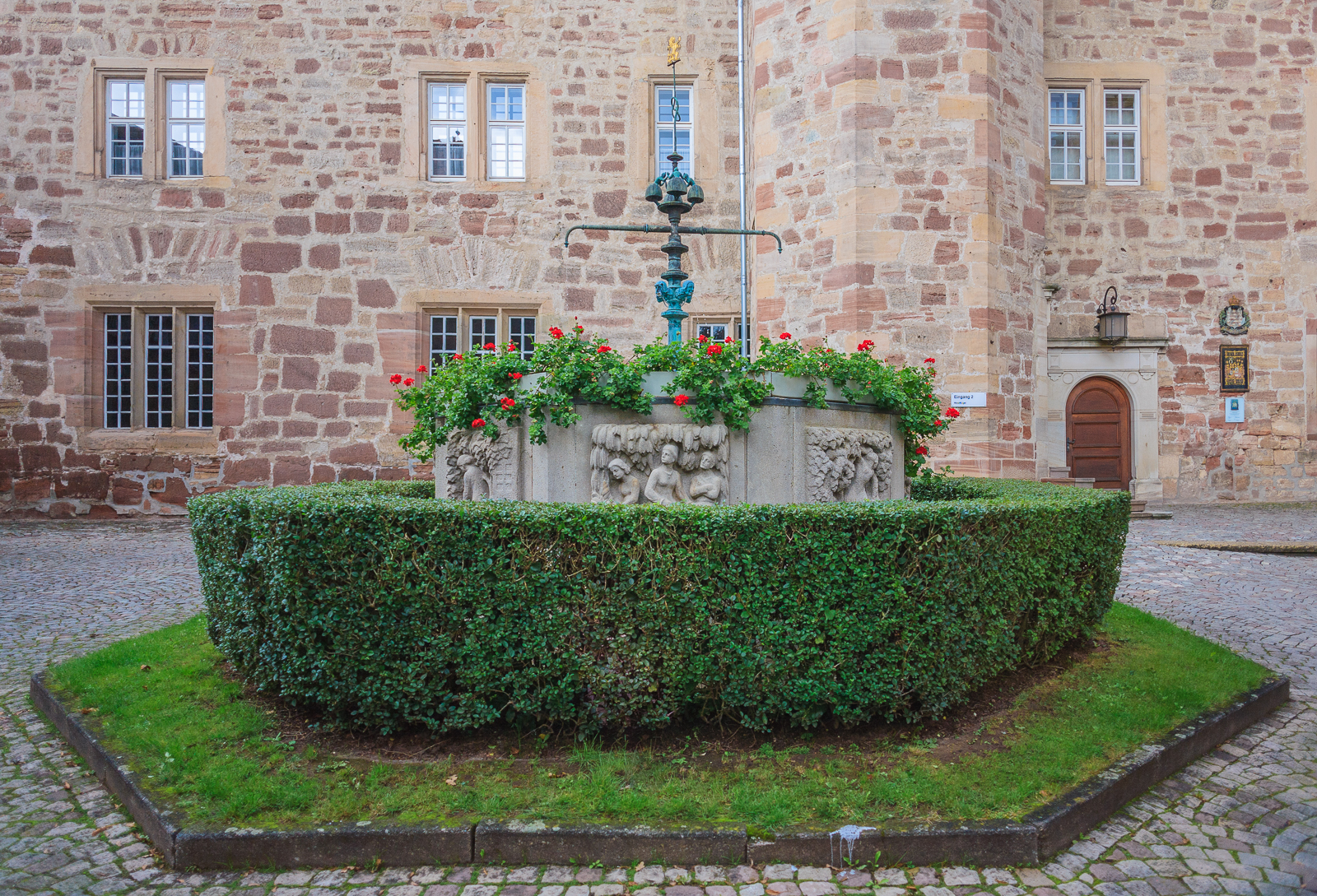
Mother Holle well Eschwege

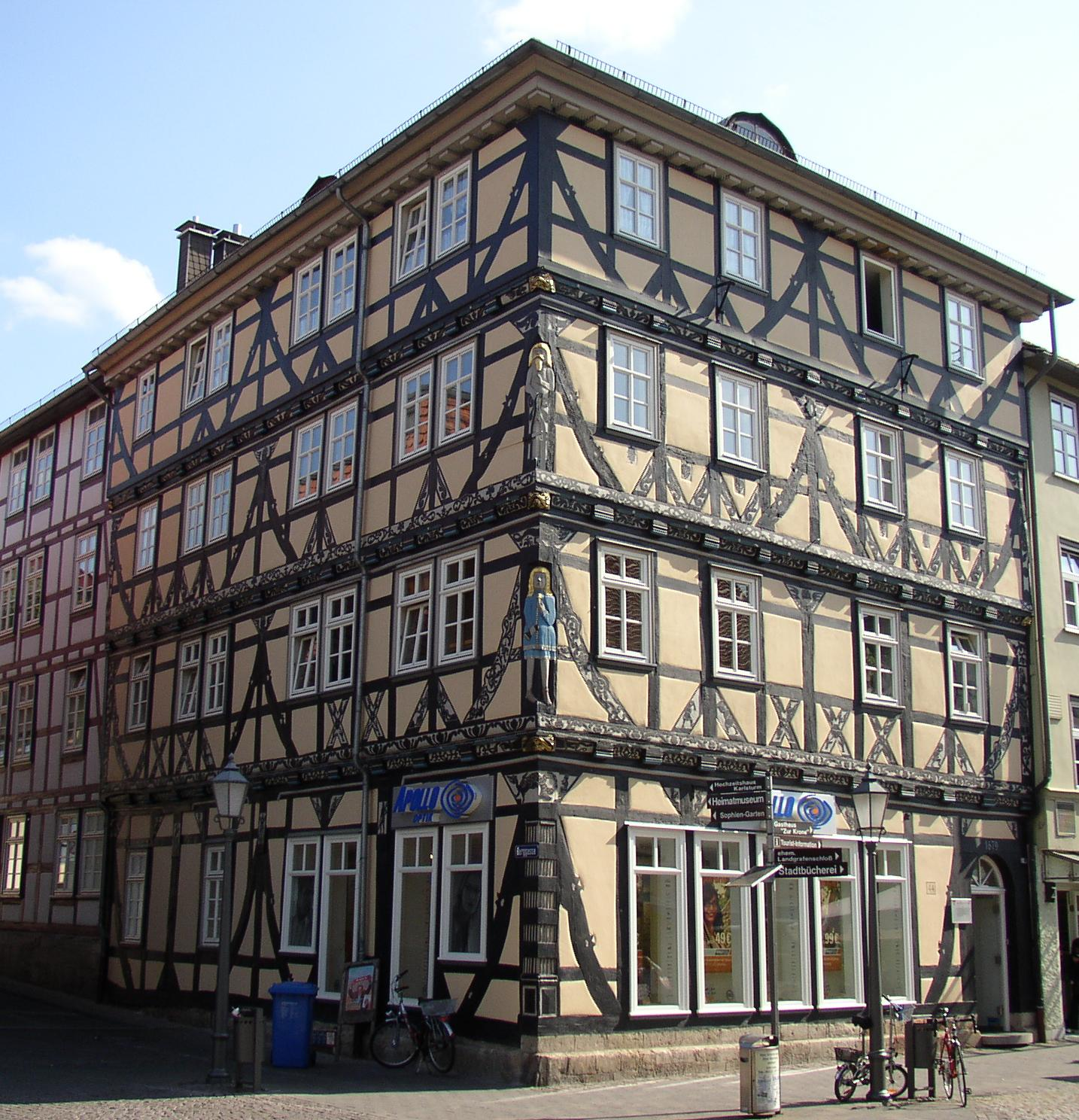
Raiffeisenhaus

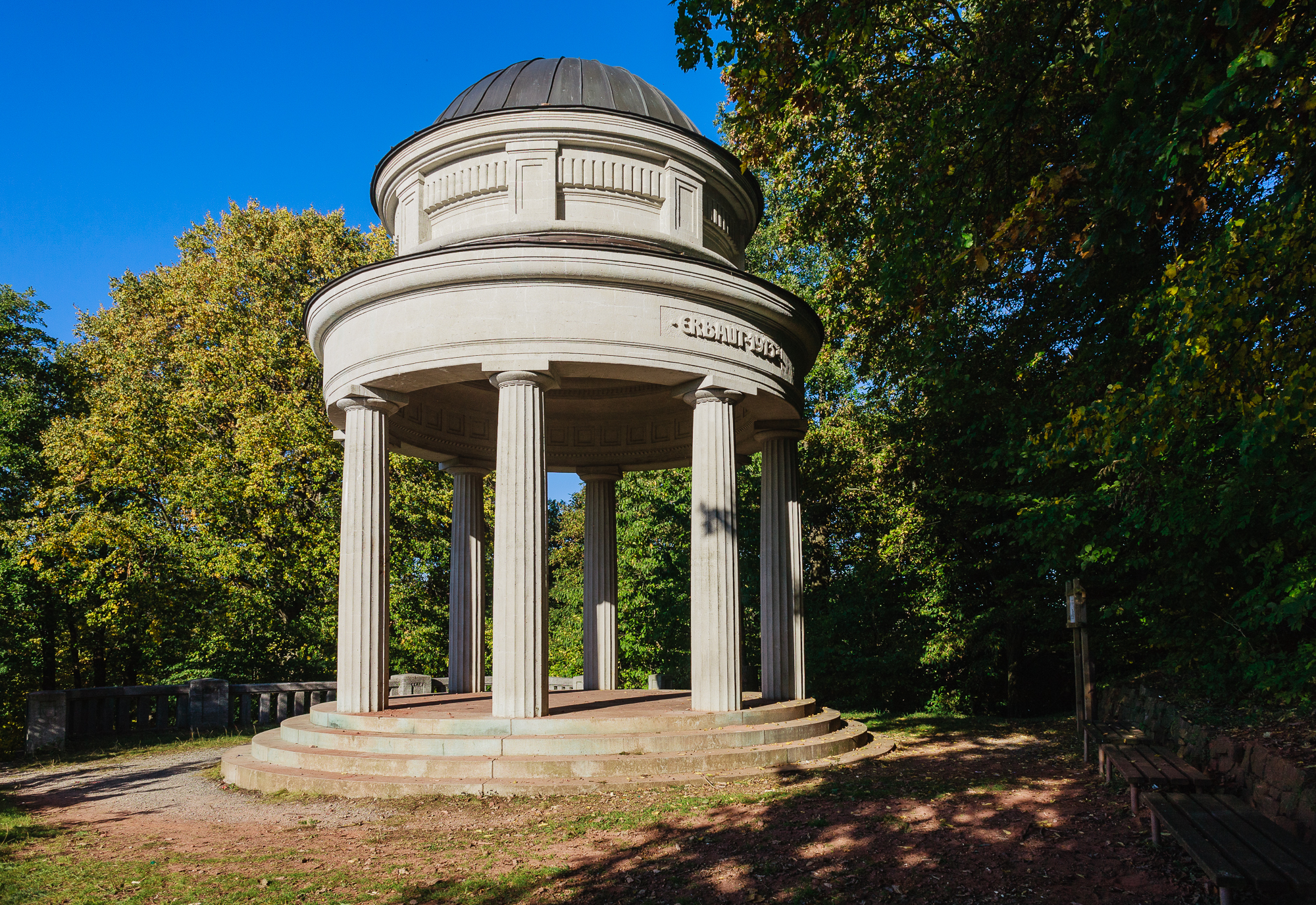
Eschwege - Schäferhalle on the Leuchtberg

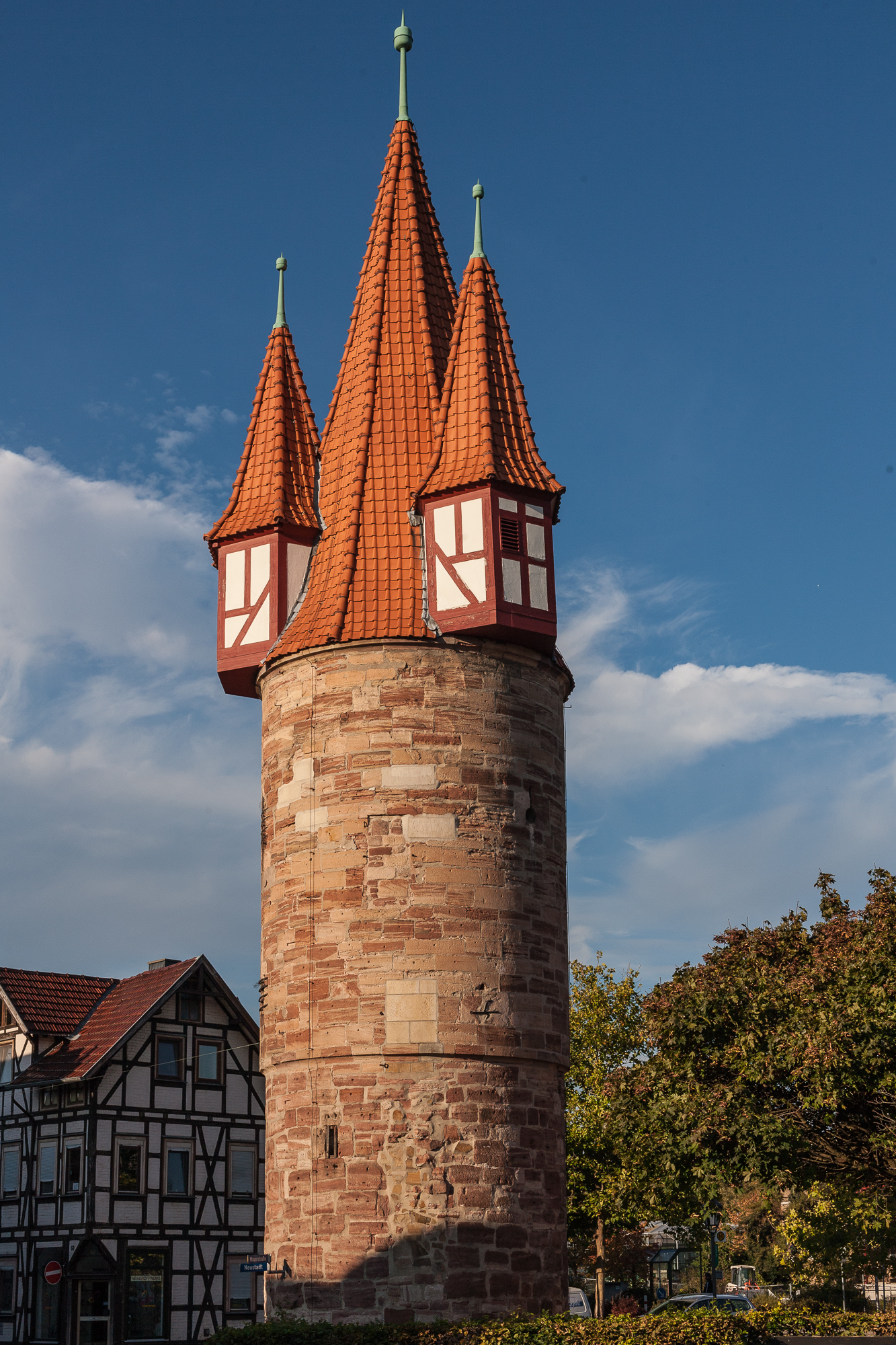
Eschwege Duenzebacher Torturm

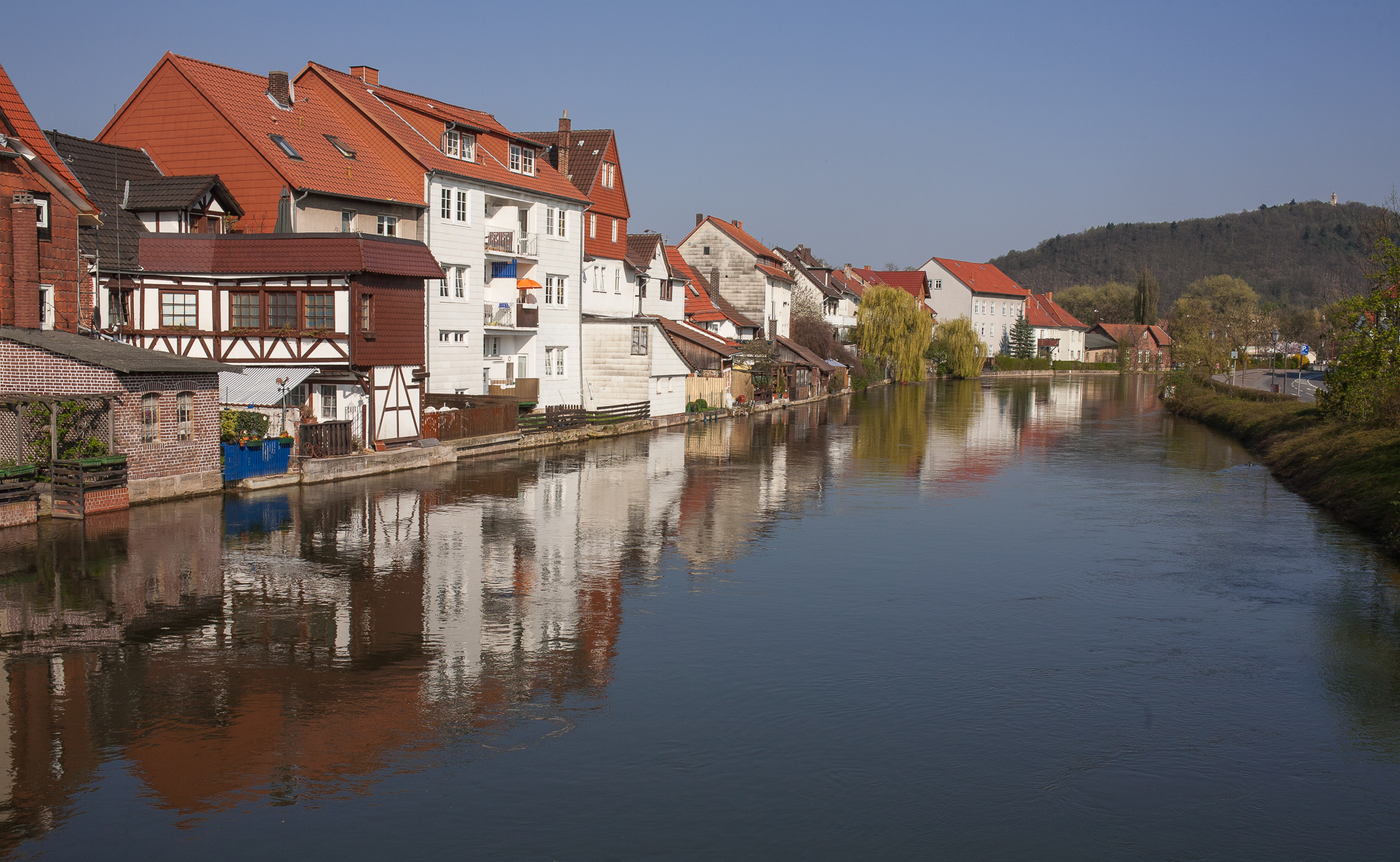
Eschwege - Houses on the river Werra

Eschwege still has a mediaeval town core with rows of timber-frame houses. Moreover, the following buildings are worth seeing:

- Neustädter Kirche St. Katharina (church)
- Marktkirche St. Dionys (market church)
- Eschwege Landgraves’ Palace (Schloss Eschwege), since 1821 seat of the district administration (1386 built as a castle, expanded into a palace in 16th and 17th centuries), with Frau Holle well built in 1930 showing on its outside reliefs of important scenes from the fairytale with the same name and with Dietemann tower, containing the Dietemann, the figure of a man with a horn, the symbol of the Eschweger, which is located in the castle tower and appears every hour to blow its horn. Also scenic are the views along the river Werra.
- Hochzeitshaus (“Wedding House”, a municipal community centre from 1578)
- Schulberg (Cyriakusberg, mountain) with the Karlsturm (tower, last remnant of a “women’s foundation” built in the 11th century)
- Nikolaiturm (former church tower from 1455)
- Bismarckturm (tower) on the Leuchtberg (from 1903)
- Dünzerbacher Torturm (tower) is one of the last remainings of the city's former fortification. The current version of this tower dates from the 17th century and was also used as a prison
- Schäferhalle (Pavilion on the west slope of the Leuchtberg)
- Former synagogue, today a New Apostolic church
- Hospital chapel
- Monastery, seat of the Eschwege monastery brewery
- Hexenkeller (“Witches’ Cellar”)

=== Parks ===
- Palace garden
- Botanical garden
- Sophiengarten
- Leuchtbergpark (with paths in and around the Greater and Lesser Leuchtberg)
- Werratalsee (lake, a local recreation area between Eschwege and Schwebda)

=== Sport ===
On the Werratalsee lies a rowing regatta course, unique in Hesse, with six lanes and a length of 1 500 m. It was expanded in 2008 to 2 000 m, giving it international dimensions, allowing the Eschwege rowing club to soon stage international competitions. Already for some years, the Hesse rowing championships have been being held here.

There is also sailing on the Werratalsee. The Werrertalsee und Segelclub WSSC 1969 Eschwege e.V. yearly organizes spring and autumn regattas. During the season, guests are welcome at the marina.

A further sporting event is the “WerraMan” Triathlon, staged by the town since 2004. The contest is held each year on the first weekend in September. The “WerraMan” and all other watersport events are supported by the local DLRG group Eschwege-Wanfried e. V.

The riding facility right near the Werratalsee is year after year the showplace for North Hesse Championships in show jumping and dressage.

Football is played in Eschwege in the clubs SV 07 Eschwege (Landesliga), FC Eschwege 1988 e.V (Kreisliga B2) and FFV Palm Strikers Eschwege (Kreisliga C2).

The Eschwege Gymnastic and Sport Club unites nine departments under one roof. It offers, among others, team handball, table tennis, gymnastics, swimming and athletics. Since 2005 there has also been a cycling sport department, making it the district's biggest sport club.

The town's biggest tennis club is TC Eschwege e.V. Its men's 50 and women's 50 teams play in the Gruppenliga (fifth highest class in Germany). The web page is www.tceschwege.de.

=== Regular events ===
Eschwege is the home of a four-day music and drinking festival called the Johannisfest, which attracts several thousand visitors. It is held alongside the Open Flair, the largest music festival in the region.

- Weekly market at the Obermarkt (“Upper Market”) every Wednesday and Saturday morning
- Johannisfest, traditionally on the first Sunday in July, but if summer holidays in Hesse begin in June, held on the last Sunday before they begin. Friday: town festival with traditional Kränzewickeln (“wreath winding”); Saturday: Maienzug (parade) of Eschwege school classes; Sunday: festival parade of Eschwege school classes with the Dietemann (a local mascot); Monday: festival conclusion and lantern sendoff by the Eschwege Rowing Club, fireworks.
- Open Flair Festival (so called, even in German) usually on the second weekend in August, is a 3-day concert/festival featuring several famous international and German bands and performers
- Pub festival in the inner town with live music in spring and autumn
- Brewery festival (Eschwege monastery brewery)
- Wurschtfest in Eschwege in September (sausage festival)
- Eschweger Puppen-Festtage (dolls), first weekend in November
- Eschwege Automobile Exhibition in the inner town in May
- Hüttenzauber, impressive before-Christmas event at the marketplace
- Christmas market at the marketplace/Obermarkt (“Upper Market”)
- Eschwege Spring festival
- Eschwege shooting festival, first weekend in September
- Fritz Jordan memorial rowing; late September on the Werra
- WerraMan - Eschwege popular triathlon (400 m swimming, 23 km cycling and 5 km walking), late August/early September

== Economy and infrastructure ==
=== Transport ===
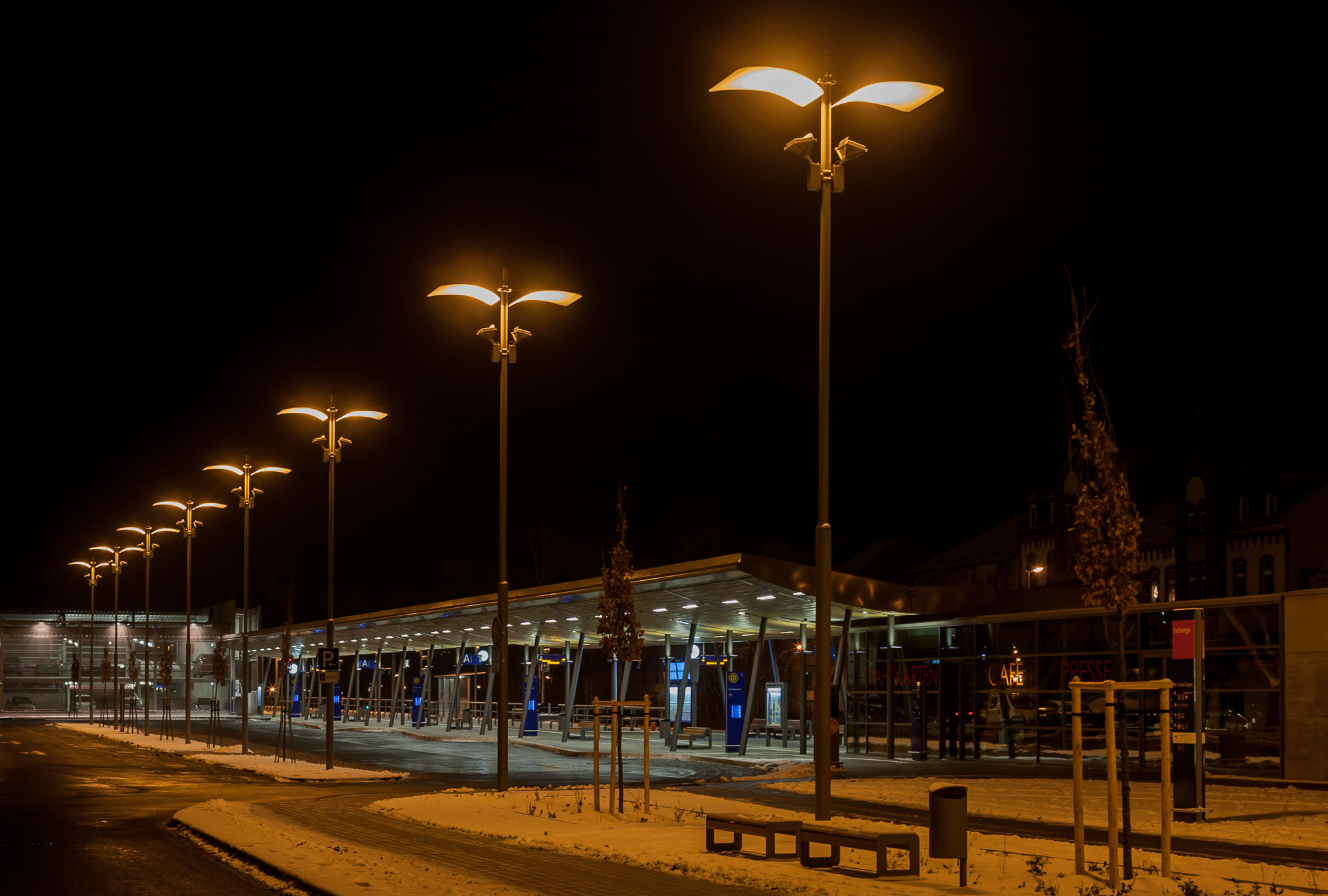
Eschwege: current town station

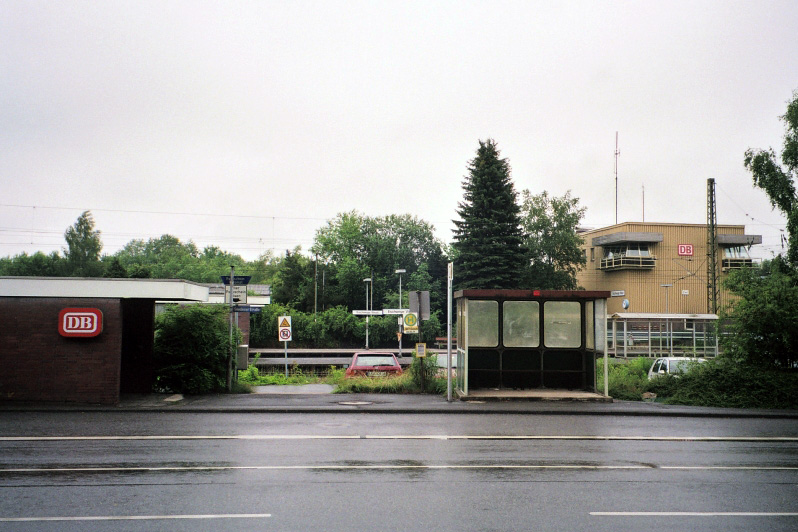
Eschwege West: former station

Through the town run Bundesstraßen 27, 249 and 452. Furthermore, Eschwege lies on the Regionalbahn line R7 (Göttingen–Eschwege–Bebra–Bad Hersfeld–Fulda) and belongs to the Nordhessischer Verkehrsverbund (“North Hesse Transport Association”, NVV). The nearby Autobahn A 44 (Kassel–Eisenach) is currently under construction.

At the timetable change on 13 December 2009, the Nordhessischer Verkehrsverbund (North Hesse Transport Association) added a service between Eschwege West and Eschwege town on its own infrastructure, which it had brought back into service and modernised. The old line, part of a closed section of the Kanonenbahn, was joined to the Göttingen–Bebra line north and south of Eschwege West station. This meant that Eschwege West station was bypassed and it was closed for scheduled passenger services. A new station was opened at Eschwege-Niederhone. A two-storey car park and a central bus station was opened at Eschwege town station.

Eschwege town station received in 2013 the European Rail Award as Small station of the Year.

=== Established businesses ===
In the field of machine building, the firms Präwema Antriebstechnik GmbH (machine tools), Pacoma GmbH (hydraulic cylinders), Baumer Thalheim GmbH & Co. KG (rotary encoders) and Georg Sahm GmbH & Co. KG (dishwashers and high-performance winders for the textile industry) are active.

Working in the field of household and system technology is the firm Stiebel Eltron GmbH & Co.KG (Eschwege works), and Friedola Gebr. Holzapfel GmbH manufactures leisure articles and table and floor coverings.

The Eschweger Klosterbrauerei GmbH (Eschwege monastery brewery) is a long established firm, having been brewing in town since the early 19th century. It regularly earns medals from the German Agricultural Society for its beers.

=== Media ===
In Eschwege appear the Werra-Rundschau and the Marktspiegel. The local radio Rundfunk Meißner has been broadcasting from here since 1997.

=== Public institutions ===
Besides the customary institutions in a district seat, and those mentioned under “Culture and sightseeing”, there are a town library and the “espada” leisure pool.

=== Education ===
In Eschwege there are two comprehensive schools, Anne-Frank-Schule and Brüder-Grimm-Schule, as well as two grammar schools, the Gymnasium Friedrich-Wilhelm-Schule (lower school) and the Oberstufengymnasium (upper school with Sixth Form).

The town council operates three primary schools, the Alexander-von-Humboldt-Schule, the Geschwister-Scholl-Schule and the Struthschule. The school for pupils with learning difficulties is called the Pestalozzischule.

Moreover, there are the Berufliche Schulen des Werra-Meißner-Kreises (district vocational schools) and the private school Freie Waldorfschule Werra-Meißner.

Further training and continuing education institutions are the Bundespolizei (German Federal Police) basic and advanced training centre Mitte, the community college and the family training centre.

== Notable people ==
=== Sons and daughters of the town ===
- Gerhard W Goetze (1930–2007), atomic physicist and inventor of SEC tube on Apollo 11 lunar camera
- Rolf Hochhuth (1931–2020), writer and playwright
- Margarete Kahn (1880–1942), mathematician
- Felix Martin (born 1994), politician
- Aliza Olmert (born 1946), writer, wife of former Israeli Prime Minister Ehud Olmert
- Markus Schulz (born 1975), Trance music DJ and producer
- Wolfram Spyra (born 1964), sound artist and composer
- Duane Washington Sr (born 1964), American professional basketball player
- Niklas Waßmann (born 1987), German politician (CDU)
- Eduard Weiter (1889–1945), last regular camp commander of Dachau concentration camp
- Paul Westheim (1886–1963), art critic, editor of the magazine "Kunstblatt"
- Markus “Zimbl” Zimmer (1964–2006), singer and bassist of the music group The Bates

=== People associated with the town ===
- Heinz Fromm (born 1948), from 2000–2012 president of the Federal office for Constitutional Protection, until his Abitur lived in Eschwege
- Hartmut Holzapfel (born 1944), Hesse education minister 1991–1999, born in Ringgau-Röhrda, until Abitur in Eschwege
- Marco Weißhaupt (born 1972), footballer, played from 2009 to 2010 at the SV 07 Eschwege

== See also ==
- Eschwege displaced persons camp
