= AUA =

AUA may stand for:

Association

- American Unitarian Association, a Unitarian religious denomination in the United States and Canada from 1828 to 1961
- American Urological Association
- Asian Universities Alliance
- Australian Uranium Association

Union

- American Union of Associationists, national organization of supporters of Fourierism in the United States from 1846 to 1851

University

- Adventist University of Africa
- Agricultural University of Athens
- American University of Antigua
- American University of Armenia
- Atlantic University Alliance, Ireland

Others

- The IATA airport code for Queen Beatrix International Airport in Oranjestad, Aruba
- Austrian Airlines (ICAO code)
- As-salamu alaykum, a traditional Islamic greeting
- Aua (band), an experimental krautrock band from Germany

Aua may refer to:

- Aua, American Samoa, a village in American Samoa
- Aua (Neuenstein), a village in Hesse, Germany
- Aua Island, an island in Bismarck Archipelago part of Western Islands, Papua New Guinea
- Aua, Reef Islands, one of the Reef Islands of the Solomon Islands province of Temotu
- Aua (angakkuq), an Inuk angakkuq (shaman)
- Aua, the Maori (indigenous) name for King Billy Island
