= Neuenstein, Hesse =

Neuenstein
- Municipality
- Coat of arms

- Location of Neuenstein within Hersfeld-Rotenburg district
- Interactive map of Neuenstein
- Location within Germany Location within Hesse
- Coordinates: 50°56′N 09°33′E
- Country: Germany
- State: Hesse
- Admin. region: Kassel
- District: Hersfeld-Rotenburg
- Subdivisions: 8 districts

Government
  - Mayor (2021–27): Roland Urstadt (CDU)

Area
  - Total: 64.8 km^{2} (25.0 sq mi)
- Elevation: 307 m (1,007 ft)

Population (2025-12-31)
  - Total: 3,006
  - Density: 46.4/km^{2} (120/sq mi)
- Time zone: UTC+01:00 (CET)
  - Summer (DST): UTC+02:00 (CEST)
- Postal codes: 36286
- Dialling codes: 06677; 06621 (Untergeis/Gittersdorf)
- Vehicle registration: HEF
- Website: www.neuenstein.net

Neuenstein (German pronunciation: [ˈnɔʏənˌʃtaɪn]) is a municipality in the Hersfeld-Rotenburg district of northeastern Hesse, Germany.

== Geography ==
=== Location ===
The community lies in the Knüllgebirge (range) in the drainage basin of the Geisbach, which rises here and only 10 km from here, in Bad Hersfeld, empties into the Fulda.

=== Neighbouring communities ===
Neuenstein borders in the north on the community of Knüllwald (in the Schwalm-Eder-Kreis), in the east on the community of Ludwigsau, in the south on the towns of Bad Hersfeld and Kirchheim (all in Hersfeld-Rotenburg), in the southwest on the community of Oberaula, and in the west on the town of Schwarzenborn (both in the Schwalm-Eder-Kreis).

=== Constituent communities ===
Neuenstein's Ortsteile are Aua, Gittersdorf, Mühlbach, Obergeis, Raboldshausen, Saasen, Salzberg and Untergeis.

== History ==
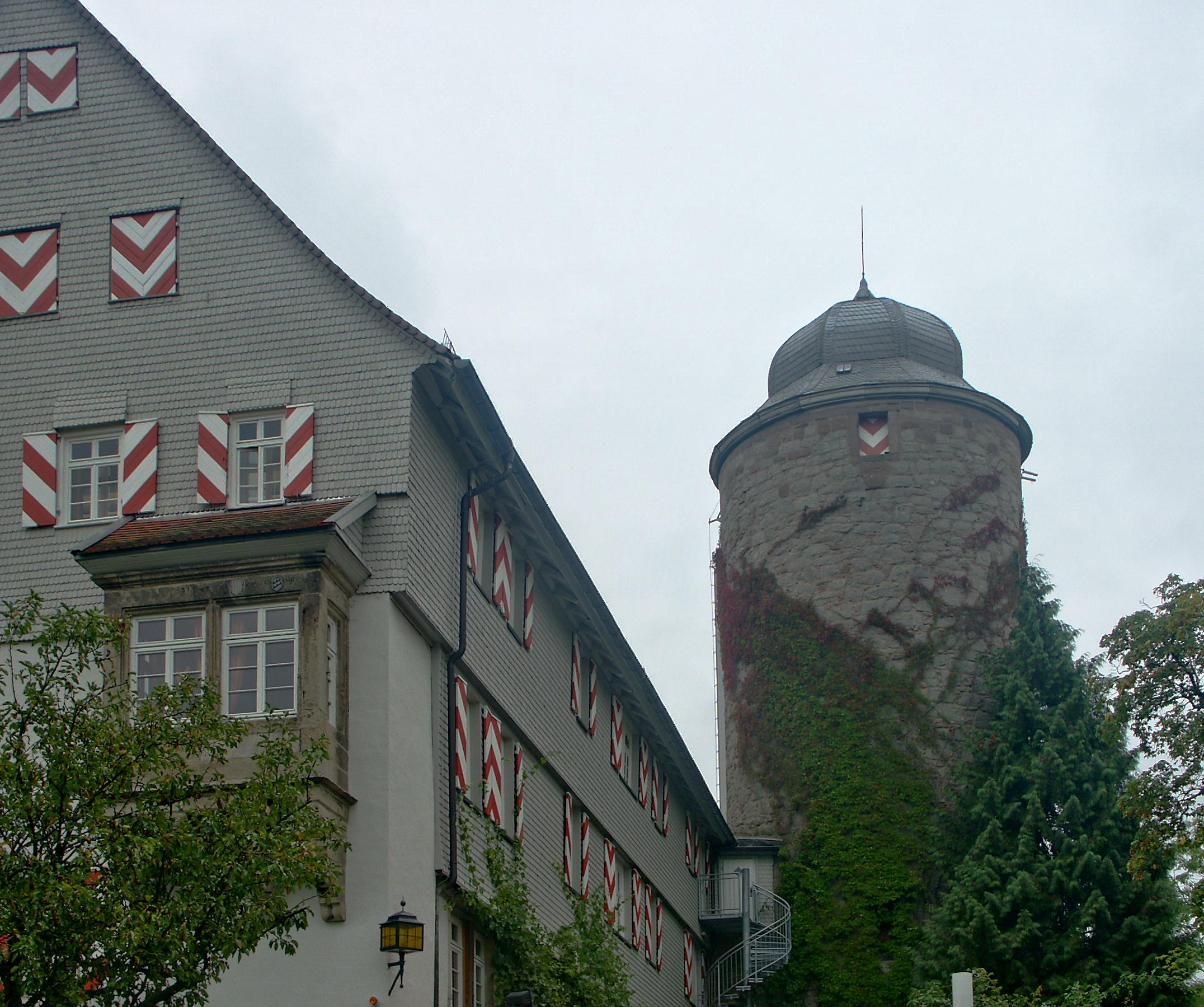
Neuenstein Castle with keep

The first documentary mention of any of the constituent communities came in 852 when Aua (Owe) was named in one of the Hersfeld Abbey’s donation documents. The abbot at Hersfeld founded a monastery here in 1190, although this moved to Blankenheim, now an outlying centre of Bebra, in 1229.

The community of Salzesberg had its first documentary mention in 1190. There is however a document from 782 about this place, but its authenticity is in dispute. All other places had their first documentary mentions in the 12th and 13th centuries. Most constituent communities were long under the Hersfeld Abbey’s or were fiefs of the Lords of Wallenstein. Albert I of Wallenstein built a castle above Saasen that had its first documentary mention in 1267 as Neuwallenstein (the family’s ancestral seat was Wallenstein Castle – now a ruin – in Knüllwald-Wallenstein). On 24 July 1318, the castle, which had since become a den for robber barons, was destroyed by Hessian Landgrave Otto’s troops as well as the Hersfeld Abbot Simon I of Buchenau’s and Count Johann I of Ziegenhain’s men, and also Eberhard von Breuberg’s, who was the state justice of the peace and Imperial state Vogt. Only in 1357 was the castle restored by Simon von Wallenstein.

Neuenstein Castle is nowadays used as a conference and event centre.

=== Amalgamations ===
The above-named constituent communities merged into the new greater community of Neuenstein with effect from 1 January 1972, with the exception of Obergeis, which was only merged, forcibly, in the course of municipal reform on 1 August 1972.

The new community’s namesake was the castle, whose mediaeval name was Neuwallenstein Castle (it is now called Neuenstein Castle, or Burg Neuenstein in German).

== Politics ==
=== Community council ===
The municipal election held on 26 March 2006 yielded the following results:

Parties and voter communities		% 2006	Seats; 2006	% 2001	Seats; 2001
CDU	Christian Democratic Union of Germany	53.6	12	59.6	14
SPD	Social Democratic Party of Germany	28.8	7	40.4	9
FWN	Freie Wähler Neuenstein	17.6	4	–	–
Total		100.0	23	100.0	23
Voter turnout in %		66.8		72.6	

=== Mayors ===
After the greater community's formation, Konrad Käberich took charge of the mayor's job from December 1972 to August 1973. The first elected mayor was Georg Ries from January 1974 to January 1980. After him came Walter Schmidt, replaced by Walter Glänzer (CDU) in 2003. The current mayor, Roland Urstadt, was elected on 26 September 2021 with 63% of the vote.

=== Coat of arms ===
The community's arms might be described thus: Gules a mount of three vert upon which barrulets argent and issuant from which a tower of the last.

The tower belongs to Neuenstein Castle, and is the community's landmark.

== Culture and sightseeing ==
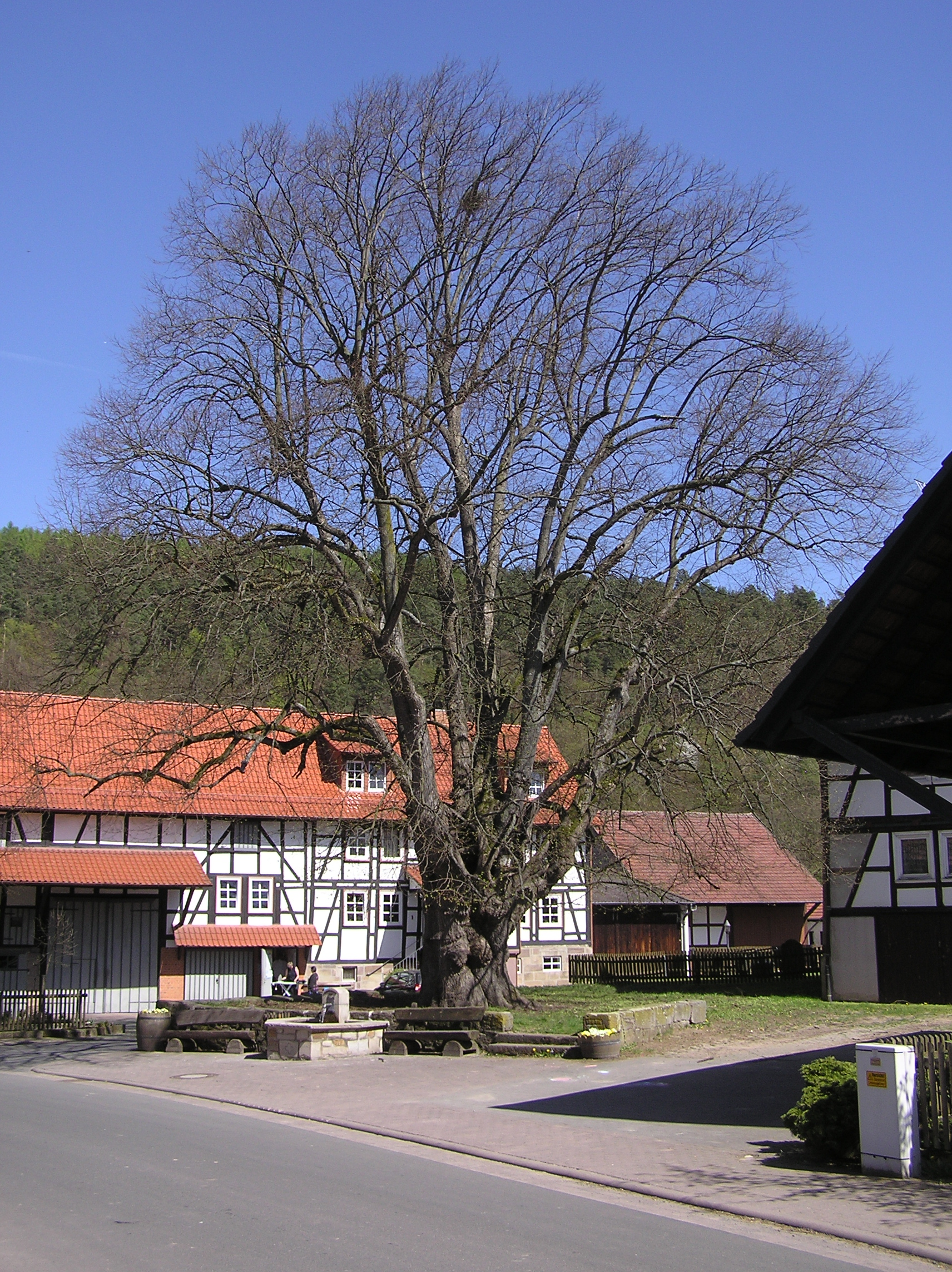
Roughly 1,200-year-old linden in the constituent community of Aua

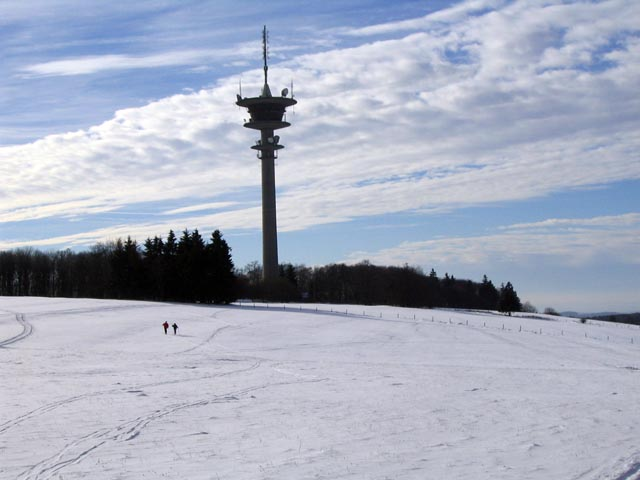
Eisenberg in winter

=== Buildings ===
- Former monastery church in the constituent community of Aua from 1190
- Neuenstein Castle in the constituent community of Saasen
- Wall graves of the family von Wallenstein in the constituent community of Raboldshausen
- Chapel from 1194 in the constituent community of Mühlbach

=== Natural monuments ===
- Eisenberg (mountain)
- Archaeological hiking path at the Eisenberg
- Roughly 1,200-year-old linden in the constituent community of Aua

== Economy and infrastructure ==
=== Transport ===
The community lies right at interchange 85, Bad Hersfeld-West on Autobahn A 7 (Flensburg–Füssen). Furthermore, Bundesstraße 324 runs through the municipal area.

=== Established businesses ===
- General Logistics Systems GmbH & Co.OHG with roughly 800 employees
- Der Kurier GmbH (courier) countrywide transport of rush deliveries overnight
