= Church bell =

Bell in a church

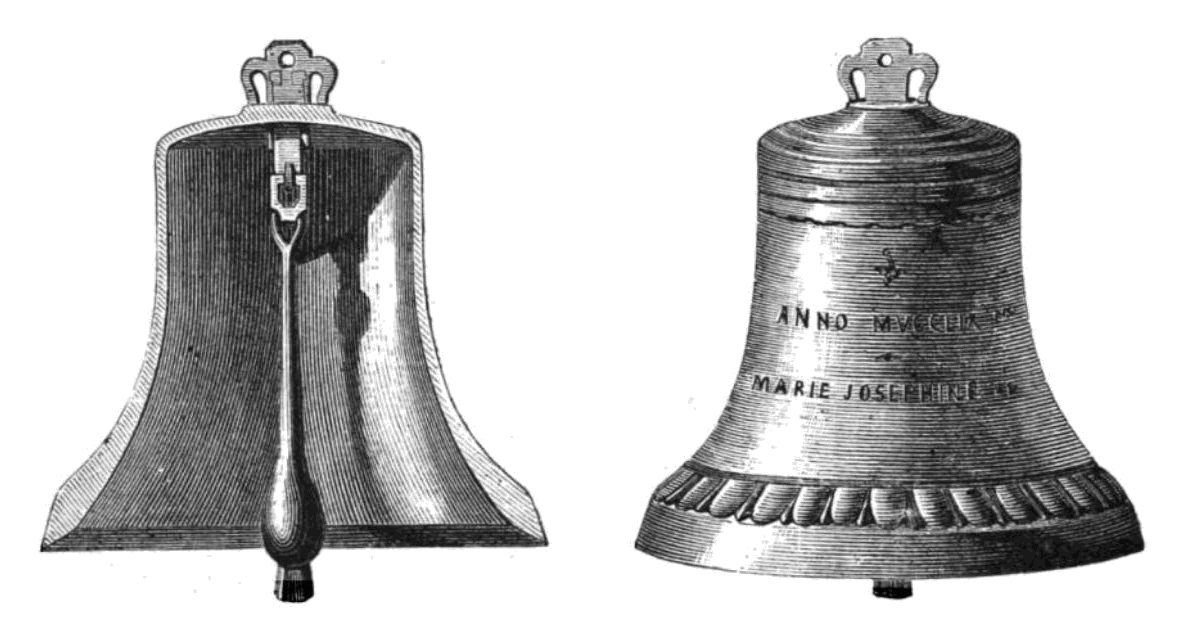
Cutaway drawing of a church bell, showing construction.

Church bell ringing in Aldeboarn, Friesland (Frisia), the Netherlands, June 2022.

A church bell is a bell in a church designed to be heard outside the building. It can be a single bell, or part of a set of bells. Their main function is to call worshippers to the church for a service of worship, but are also rung on special occasions such as a wedding, or a funeral service. In certain Christian traditions, such as Catholicism and Lutheranism, church bells signify to people both inside and outside of the church that a particular part of the service (such as the recitation of the Lord's Prayer or consecration of Holy Communion) has been reached. The ringing of church bells thrice a day occurs in congregations of certain Christian denominations as a call to prayer, reminding the faithful to pray the Lord's Prayer or the Angelus Domini.

The traditional European church bell (see cutaway drawing) used in Christian churches worldwide consists of a cup-shaped metal resonator with a pivoted clapper hanging inside which strikes the sides when the bell is swung. It is hung within a steeple or belltower of a church or religious building, so the sound can reach a wide area. Such bells are either fixed in position ("hung dead") or hung from a pivoted beam (the "headstock") so they can swing to and fro. A rope hangs from a lever or wheel attached to the headstock, and when the bell ringer pulls on the rope the bell swings back and forth and the clapper hits the inside, sounding the bell. Bells that are hung dead are normally sounded by hitting the sound bow with a hammer or occasionally by a rope which pulls the internal clapper against the bell.

A church may have a single bell, or a collection of bells which are tuned to a common scale. They may be stationary and chimed, rung randomly by swinging through a small arc, or swung through a full circle to enable the high degree of control of English change ringing.

Before modern communications, church bells were a common way to call the community together for all purposes, both sacred and secular. In some Christian traditions bell ringing was believed to drive out demons.

== Uses and traditions ==
=== Call to prayer ===
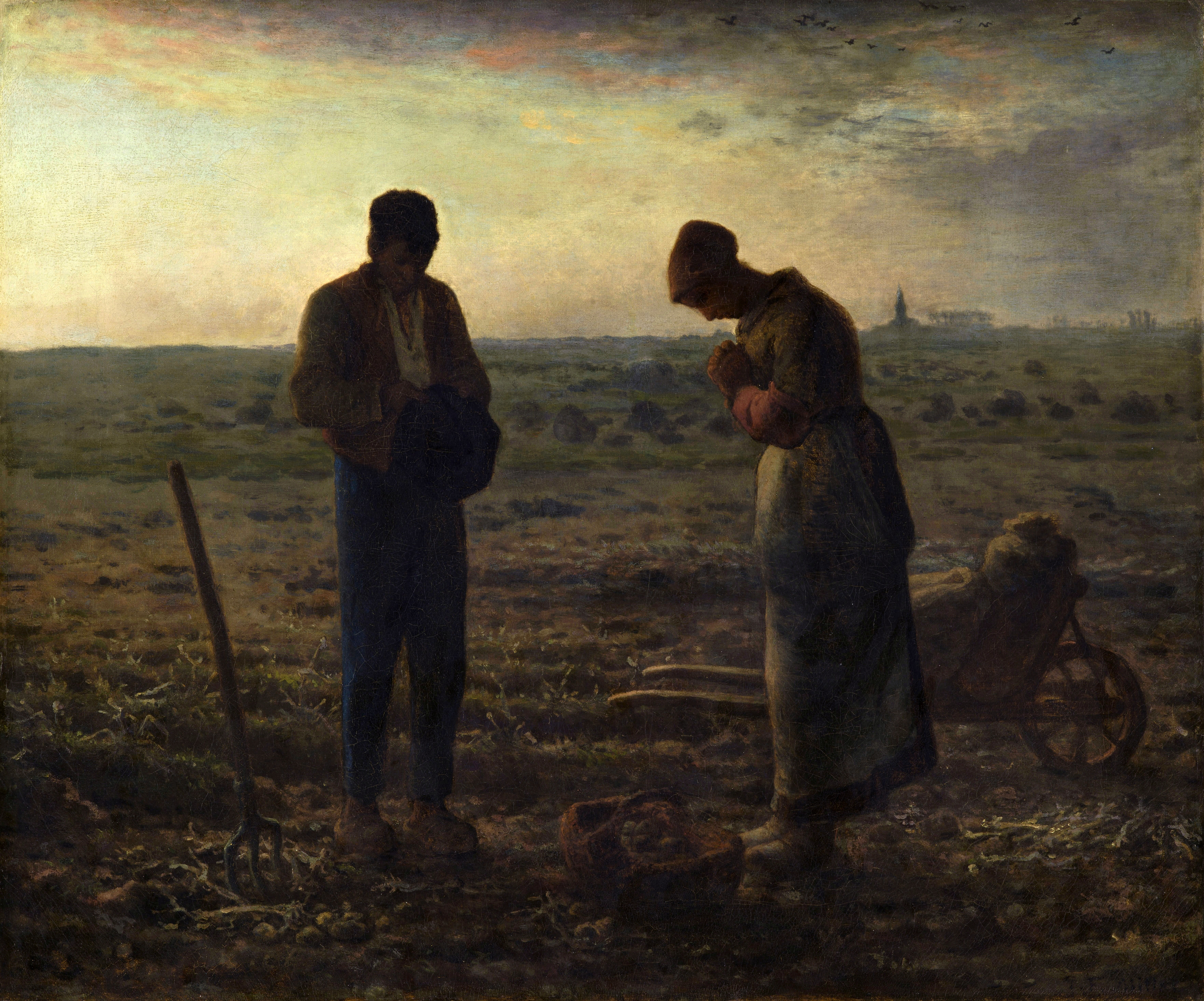
The Angelus, depicting prayer at the sound of the bell (in the steeple on the horizon) ringing a canonical hour.

Oriental Orthodox Christians, such as Copts and Indians, use a breviary such as the Agpeya and Shehimo to pray the canonical hours seven times a day while facing in the eastward direction; church bells are tolled, especially in monasteries, to mark these seven fixed prayer times.

In Christianity, some churches ring their church bells from belltowers three times a day, at 9 am, noon and 3 pm to summon the Christian faithful to recite the Lord's Prayer; the injunction to pray the Lord's prayer thrice daily was given in Didache 8, 2 f., which, in turn, was influenced by the Jewish practice of praying thrice daily found in the Old Testament, specifically in Psalm 55:17, which suggests "morning and evening plus at noon", and Daniel 6:10, in which the prophet Daniel prays thrice a day. The early Christians thus came to pray the Lord's Prayer at 9 am, noon and 3 pm.

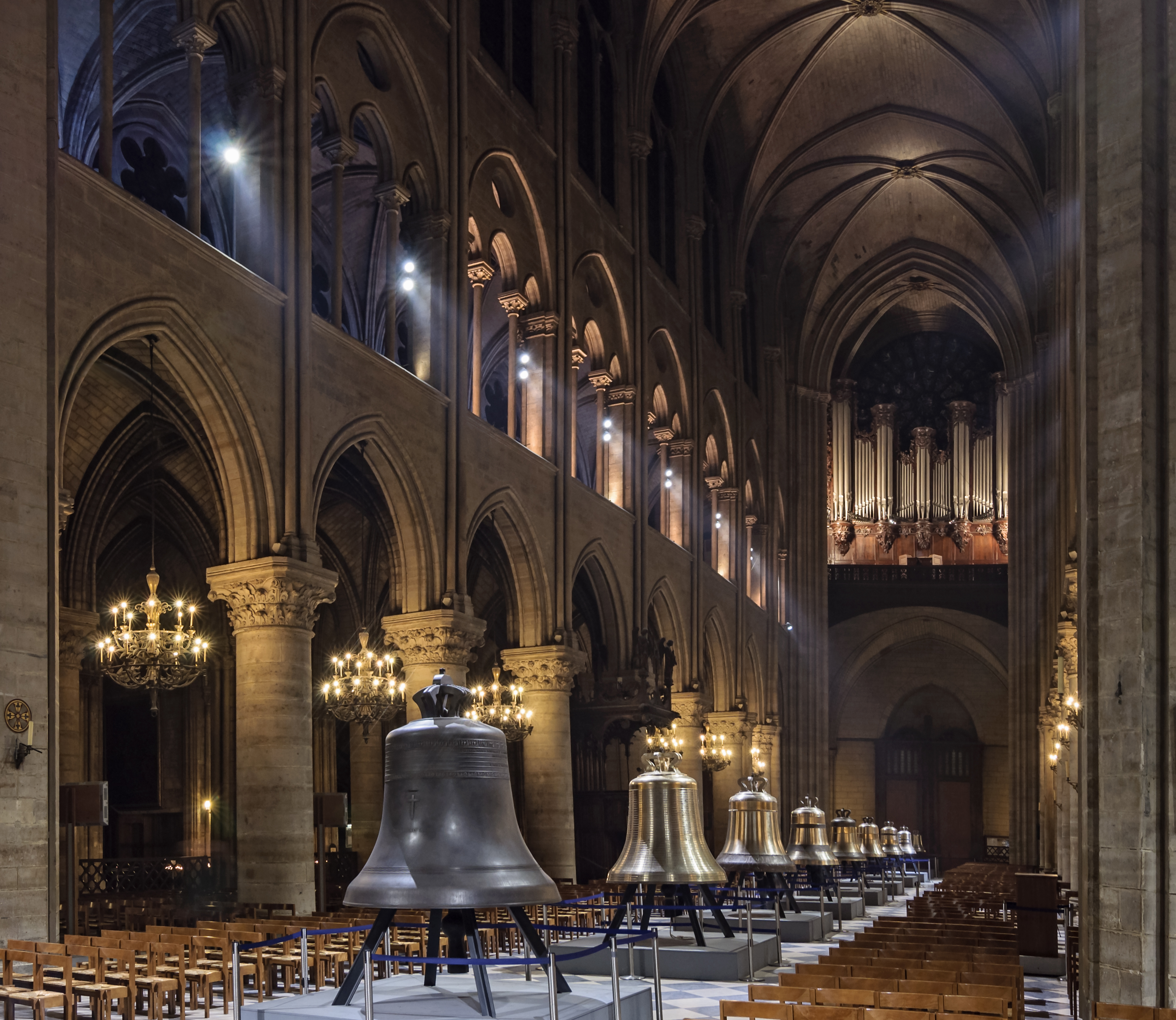
The new bells of Notre Dame de Paris on display in the nave in February 2013 before being hung in the towers of the cathedral.

Many Catholic Christian churches ring their bells thrice a day, at 6 am, noon, and 6 pm to call the faithful to recite the Angelus, a prayer recited in honour of the Incarnation of God.

Some Protestant Christian Churches ring church bells during the congregational recitation of the Lord's Prayer, after the sermon, in order to alert those who are unable to be present to "unite themselves in spirit with the congregation".

In many historic Christian Churches, church bells are also rung on All Hallows' Eve, as well as during the processions of Candlemas and Palm Sunday; the only time of the Christian Year when church bells are not rung include Maundy Thursday through the Easter Vigil. The Christian tradition of the ringing of church bells from a belltower is analogous to the Islamic tradition of the adhan from a minaret.

=== Call to worship ===
Most Christian denominations ring church bells to call the faithful to worship, signalling the start of a Mass or service of worship.

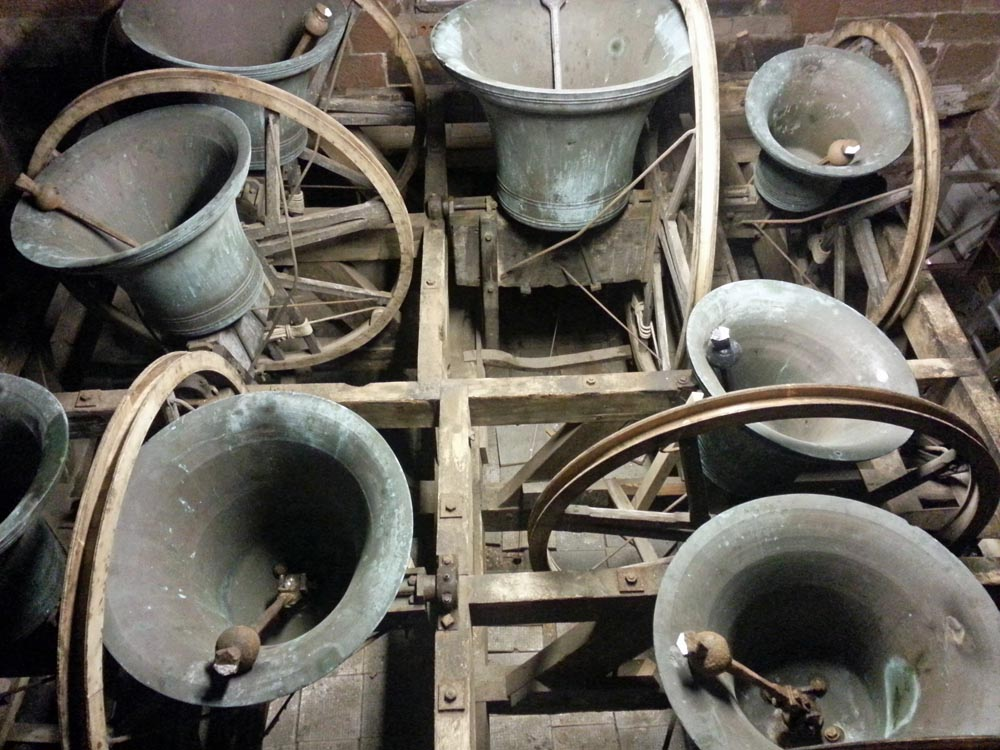
Example of full-circle bells in England in the "up" position.

In the United Kingdom predominantly in the Anglican church, there is a strong tradition of change ringing on full-circle tower bells for about half an hour before a service. This originated from the early 17th century when bell ringers found that swinging a bell through a large arc gave more control over the time between successive strikes of the clapper. This culminated in ringing bells through a full circle, which let ringers easily produce different striking sequences; known as changes.

=== Exorcism of demons ===
In Christianity, the ringing of church bells is traditionally believed to drive out demons and other unclean spirits. Inscriptions on church bells relating to this purpose of church bells, as well as the purpose of serving as a call to prayer and worship, were customary, for example "the sound of this bell vanquishes tempests, repels demons, and summons men". Some churches have several bells with the justification that "the more bells a church had, the more loudly they rang, and the greater the distance over which they could be heard, the less likely it was that evil forces would trouble the parish."

=== Funeral and memorial ringing ===
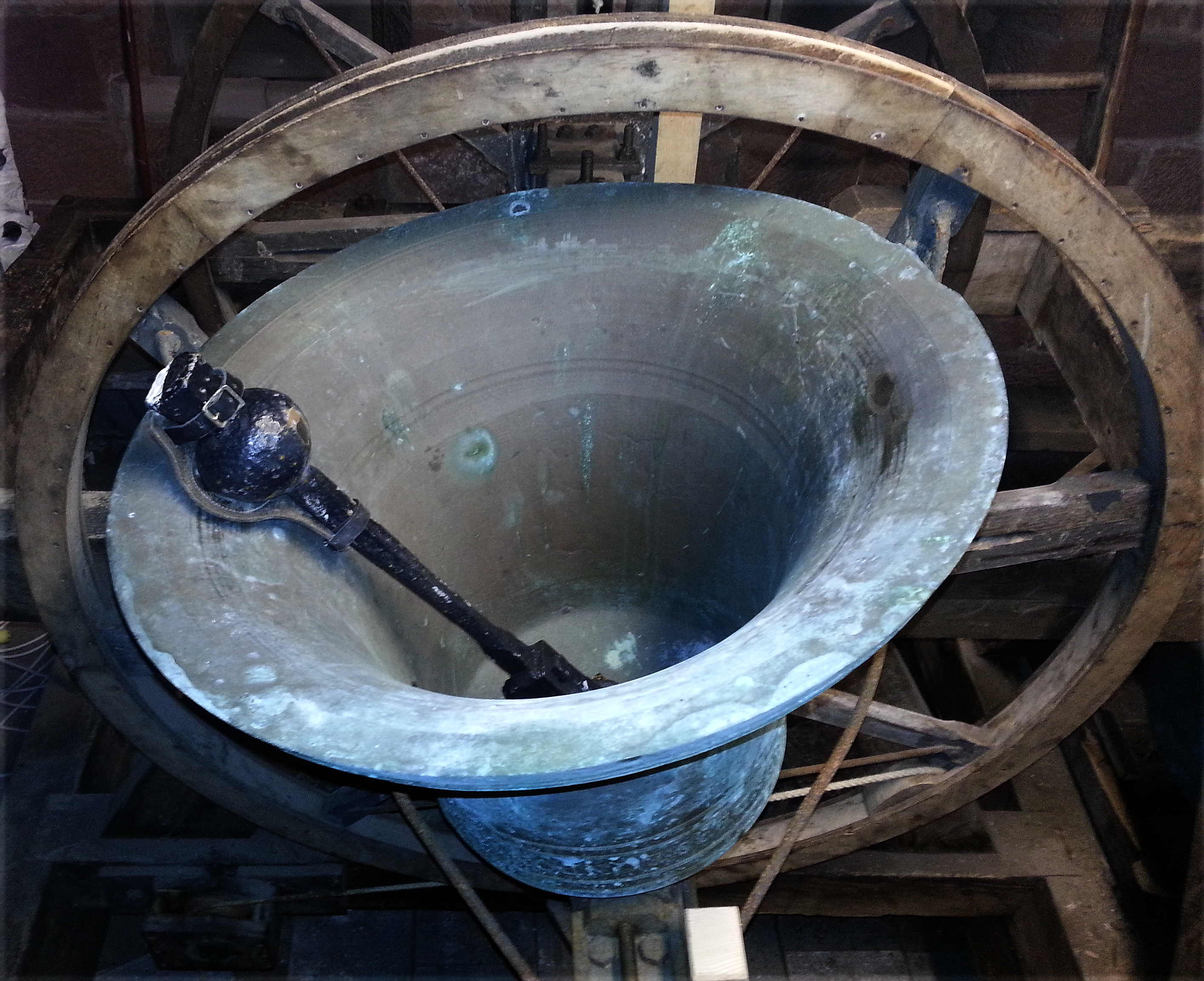
English-style full circle bell with clapper half-muffled. A leather muffle is put over one side only of the clapper ball. This gives a loud strike, then a muffled strike alternately.

The ringing of a church bell in the English tradition to announce a death is called a death knell. The pattern of striking depended on the person who had died; for example, in the counties of Kent and Surrey in England, it was customary to ring three times three strokes for a man and three times two for a woman, with varying usage for children. The age of the deceased was then rung out. In small settlements, this could effectively identify who had just died.

There were three occasions surrounding a death when bells could be rung. There was the "Passing Bell" to warn of impending death, the second was the actual Death Knell to announce the death, and the last was the "Lych Bell", or "Corpse Bell", rung as the funeral procession approached the church. This latter is known today as the Funeral toll.

A more modern tradition where there are full-circle bells is to use "half-muffles" when sounding one bell as a tolled bell, or all the bells in change-ringing. This means a leather muffle is placed on the clapper of each bell so that there is a loud "open" strike followed by a muffled strike, which has a very sonorous and mournful effect. In the United Kingdom, bells are traditionally rang fully muffled only at the death of the sovereign. A slight variant of this rule occurred in 2015, when the bones of Richard III of England were found and later interred in Leicester Cathedral, 532 years after his death at the Battle of Bosworth Field.

=== Sanctus bells ===
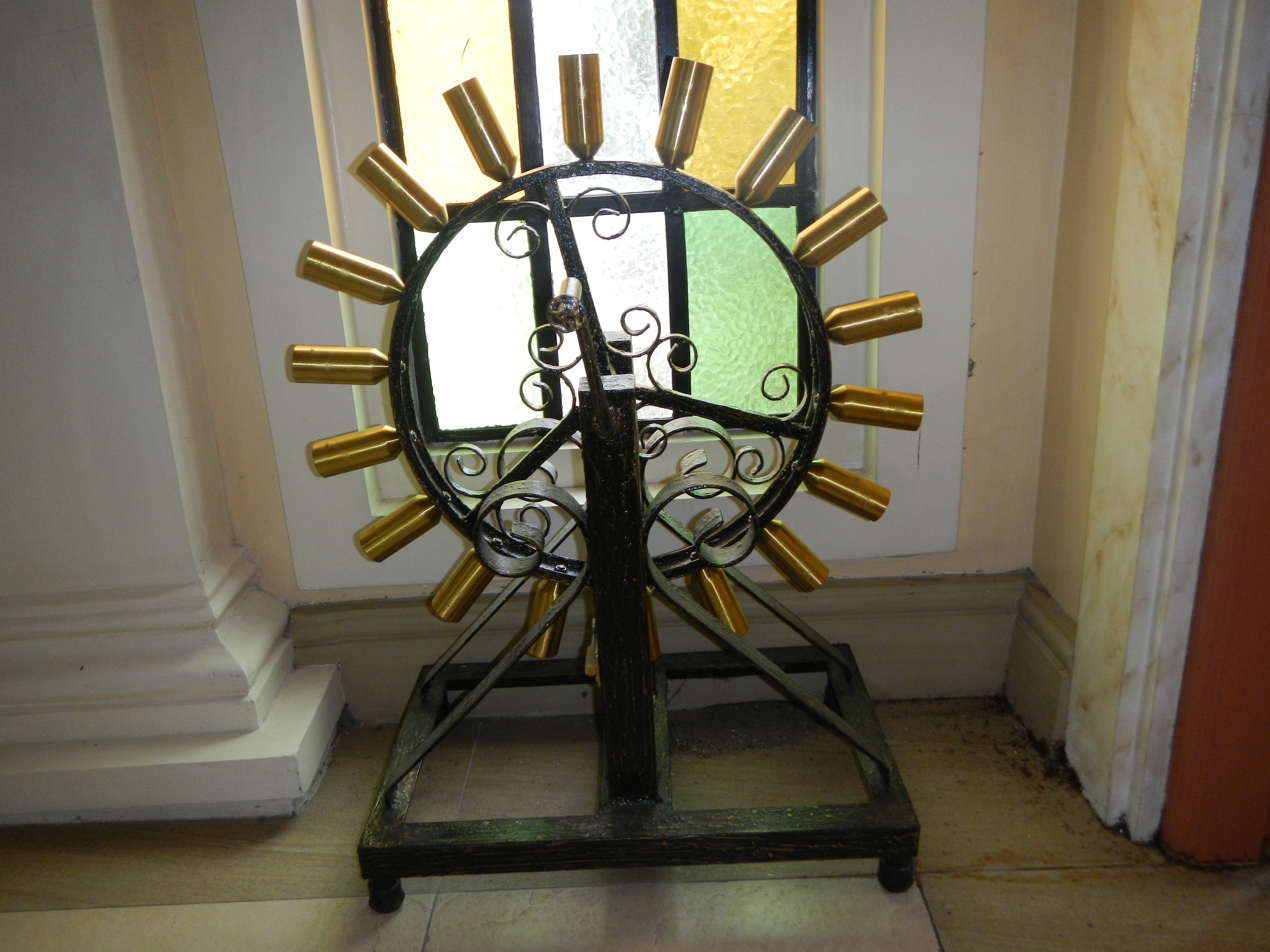
The sacring ring or Gloria wheels used at the St. Jude Thaddeus Church, in the former Spanish colony of the Philippines.

The term "Sanctus bell" traditionally referred to a bell suspended in a bell-cot at the apex of the nave roof, over the chancel arch, or hung in the church tower, in medieval churches. This bell has been rung at the singing of the Sanctus and again at the elevation of the consecrated elements, to indicate to those unable to see the altar that the consecration had been reached. The practice and the term remain common in many Traditional Catholic, Lutheran and Anglican churches.

A small hand bell or set of such bells (called altar bells) may also be rung as a signal shortly before the consecration of the bread and wine into the Body and Blood of Christ, and again when each of the consecrated elements is shown to the people. Sacring rings or "Gloria wheels" are commonly used by Catholic churches in Spain and its former colonies for this purpose, with modern ones made from metal instead of the traditional wood.

=== Orthodox Church ===
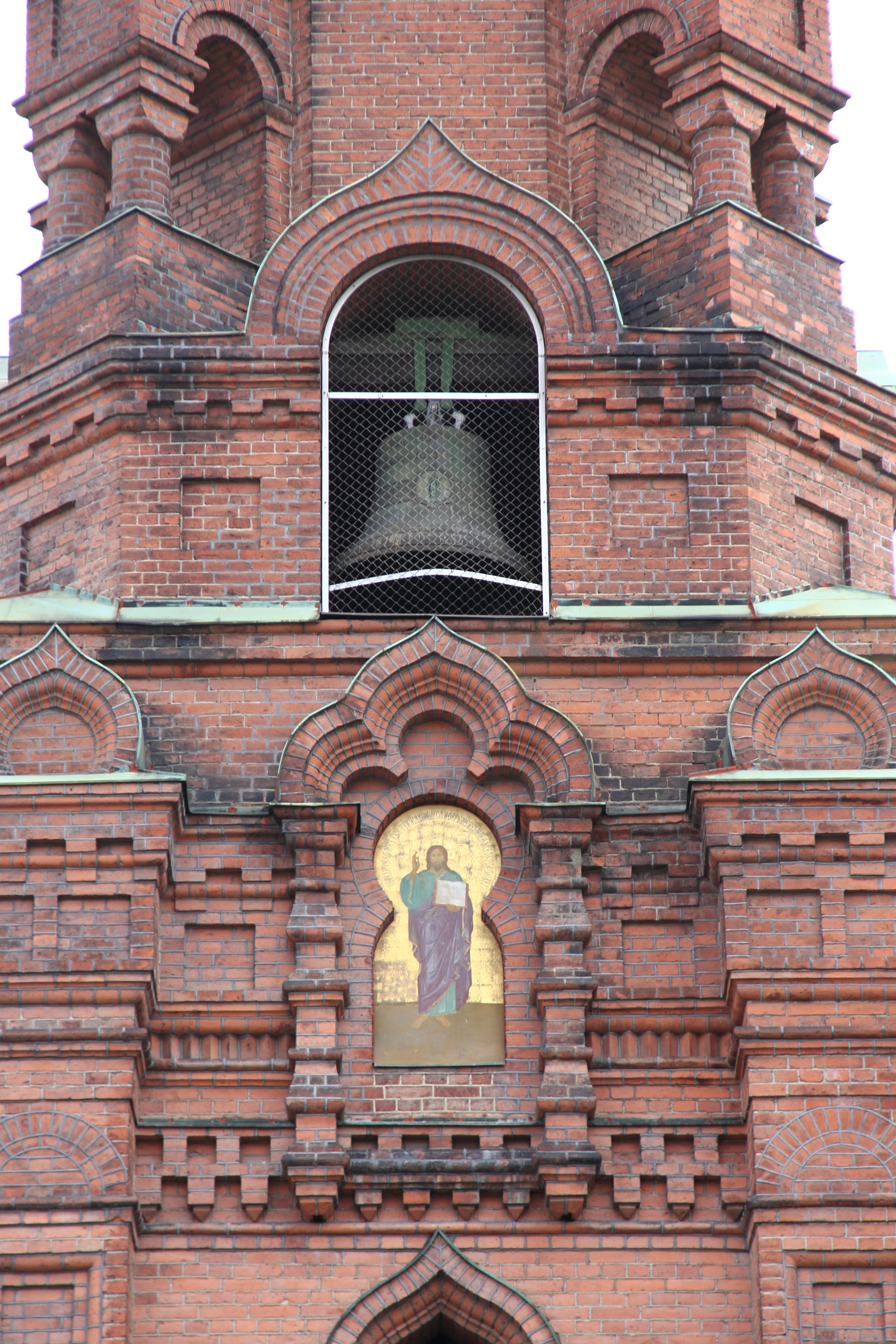
A church bell of the Alexander Nevsky and the Saint Nicholas Orthodox Church in Tampere, Finland

In the Eastern Orthodox Church there is a long and complex history of bell ringing, with particular bells being rung in particular ways to signify different parts of the divine services, Funeral tolls, etc. This custom is particularly sophisticated in the Russian Orthodox Church. Russian bells are usually stationary, and are sounded by pulling on a rope that is attached to the clapper so that it will strike the inside of the bell.

=== Victory Celebration ===
The noon church bell tolling in Europe has a specific historical significance that has its roots in the Siege of Belgrade by the Ottomans in 1456. Initially, the bell ringing was intended as a call to prayer for the victory of the defenders of Belgrade. However, because in many European countries the news of victory arrived before the order for prayer, the ringing of the church bells was believed to be in celebration of the victory. As a result, the significance of noon bell ringing is now a commemoration of John Hunyadi's victory against the Turks.

=== Other uses ===
==== Clock chimes ====
Some churches have a clock chime which uses a turret clock to broadcast the time by striking the hours and sometimes the quarters. A well-known musical striking pattern is the Westminster Quarters. This is only done when the bells are stationary, and the clock mechanism actuates hammers striking on the outside of the sound-bows of the bells. In the cases of bells which are normally swung for other ringing, there is a manual lock-out mechanism which prevents the hammers from operating whilst the bells are being rung.

==== Warning ====
In World War II in Great Britain, all church bells were silenced, to ring only to inform of an invasion by enemy troops. However this ban was lifted temporarily in 1942 by order of Winston Churchill. Starting with Easter Sunday, April 25, 1943, the Control of Noise (Defence) (No. 2) Order, 1943, allowed that church bells could be rung to summon worshippers to church on Sundays, Good Friday and Christmas Day. On May 27, 1943, all restrictions were removed.

In the 2021 German floods it was reported that church bells were rung to warn inhabitants of coming floods. In Beyenburg in Wuppertal the last friar of Steinhaus Abbey rang the storm bells after other systems failed. Some church bells are being used in England for similar purposes.

== Design and ringing technique ==
Bell
- Parts of a typical tower bell hung for swinging: 1. yoke, or headstock 2. canons, 3. crown, 4. shoulder, 5. waist, 6. sound bow, 7. lip, 8. mouth, 9. clapper, 10. bead line

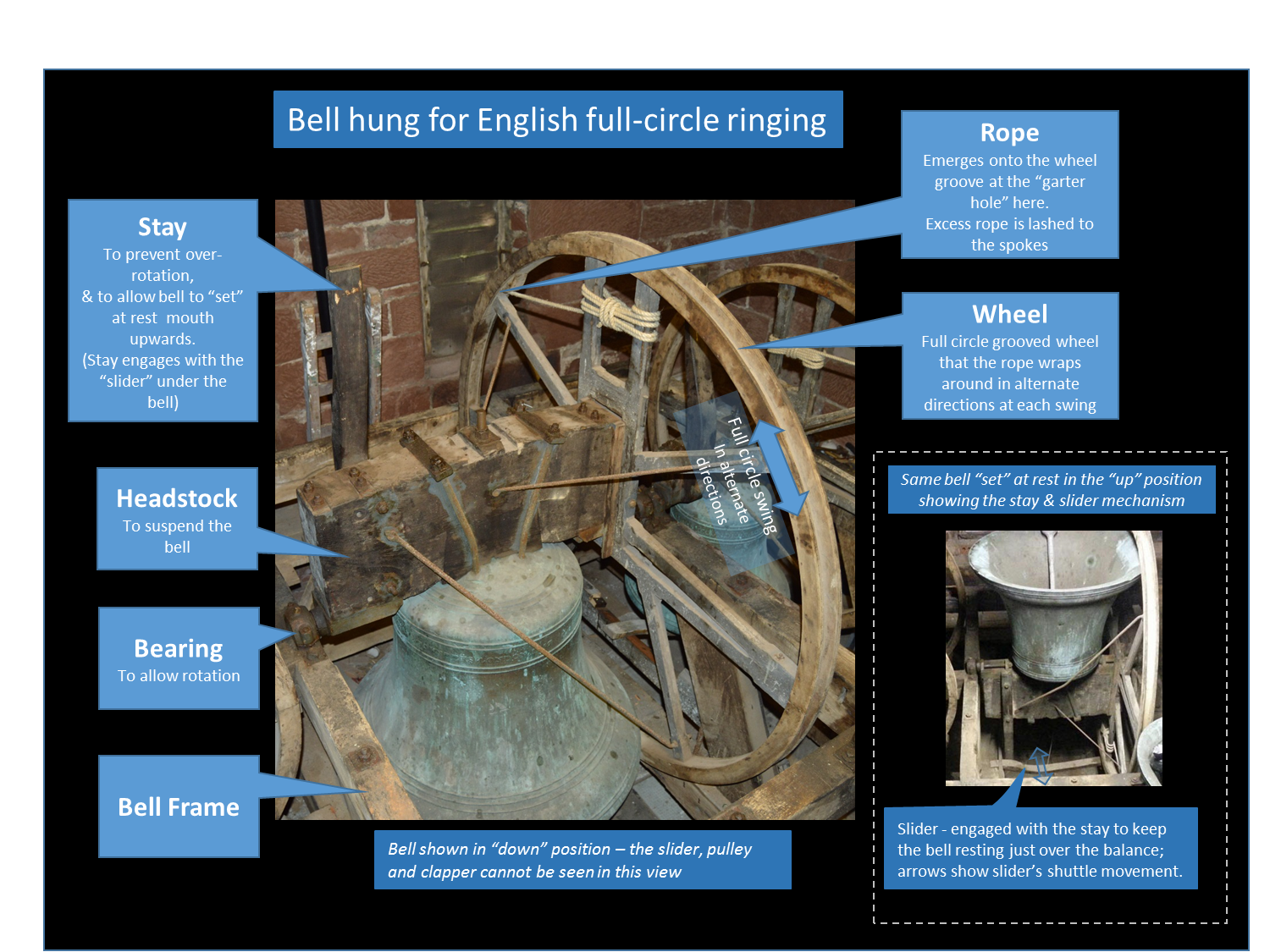
Mechanism of a bell hung for English full-circle ringing. The bell can swing through just over a full circle in alternate directions.

Christian church bells have the form of a cup-shaped cast metal resonator with a flared thickened rim, and a pivoted clapper hanging from its centre inside. It is usually mounted high in a bell tower on top of the church, so it can be heard by the surrounding community. The bell is suspended from a headstock which can swing on bearings. A rope is tied to a wheel or lever on the headstock, and hangs down to the bell ringer. To ring the bell, the ringer pulls on the rope, swinging the bell. The motion causes the clapper to strike the inside of the bell rim as it swings, thereby sounding the bell. Some bells have full-circle wheels, which is used to swing the bell through a larger arc, such as in the United Kingdom where full-circle ringing is practised.

Bells which are not swung are "chimed", which means they are struck by an external hammer, or by a rope attached to the internal clapper, which is the tradition in Russia.

== Blessing of bells ==
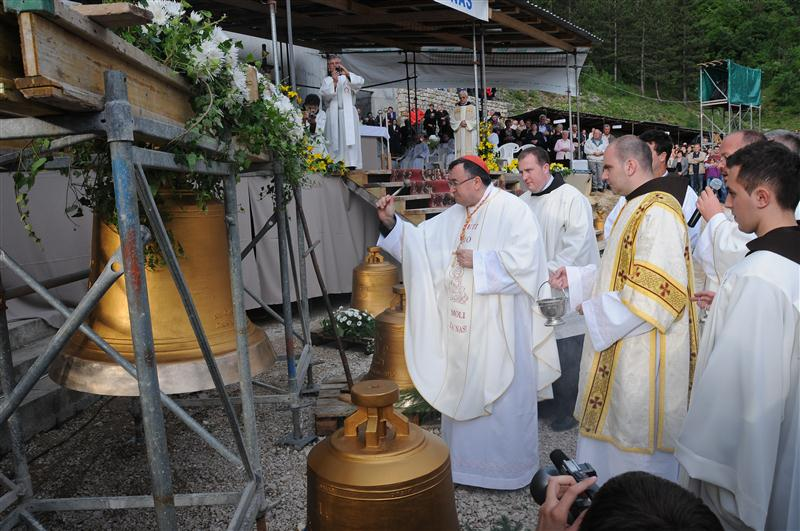
Ceremony of blessing of the bell in Hungary

In some churches, bells are often blessed before they are hung.

In the Roman Catholic Church the name Baptism of Bells has been given to the ceremonial blessing of church bells, at least in France, since the eleventh century. It is derived from the washing of the bell with holy water by the bishop, before he anoints it with the "oil of the infirm" without and with chrism within; a fuming censer is placed under it and the bishop prays that these sacramentals of the Church may, at the sound of the bell, put the demons to flight, protect from storms, and call the faithful to prayer.

== History ==
See European medieval musical instruments, percussion

Before the introduction of church bells into the Christian Church, different methods were used to call the worshippers: playing trumpets, hitting semantrons (wooden planks), shouting, or using a courier. In AD 604, Pope Sabinian officially sanctioned the usage of bells. These tintinnabula were made from forged metal and did not have large dimensions. Larger bells were made at the end of the 7th and during the 8th century by casting metal originating from Campania. The bells consequently took the name of campana and nola from the eponymous city in the region. This would explain the attribution of the origin of church bells to Paulinus of Nola in AD 400. By the early Middle Ages, church bells became common in Europe, rung singly (cymbalum) or in tuned sets (cymbalum).

They were first common in northern Europe, quadrangular sheet-metal bells, reflecting Celtic influence, especially that of Irish missionaries. Before the use of church bells, Greek monasteries would ring a flat metal plate (see semantron) to announce services. The signa and campanae used to announce services before Irish influence may have been flat plates like the semantron rather than bells. The oldest surviving circle of bells in Great Britain is housed in St Lawrence Church, Ipswich.

As bells became more numerous, they were hung in sets called cymbala (related to both chimes and cymbals) and played with a hammer. Images "usually show from four and eight bells", but also as many as 15.

== In literature ==
The evocative sound of church bells has inspired many writers, both in poetry and prose. One example is an early poem by the English poet Letitia Elizabeth Landon entitled simply, Bells. She returned to the subject towards the end of her life in Fisher's Drawing Room Scrap Book, 1839 with The Village Bells., a poetical illustration to a picture by J. Franklin. How Soft the Music of those Village Bells.

== Controversies about noise ==
The sound of church bells is capable of causing noise that interrupts or prevents people from sleeping. A 2013 study from the Swiss Federal Institute of Technology in Zurich found that "an estimated 2.5-3.5 percent of the population in the Canton of Zurich experiences at least one additional awakening per night due to church bell noise." It concluded that "the number of awakenings could be reduced by more than 99 percent by, for example, suspending church bell ringing between midnight and 06 h in the morning", or by "about 75 percent (...) by reducing the sound-pressure levels of bells by 5 dB."

In the Netherlands there have been lawsuits about church bell noise pollution experienced by nearby residents. The complaints are usually, but not always, raised by new local residents (or tourists who spend the night in the neighbourhood) who are not used to the noise at night or during the day.

== Image gallery ==
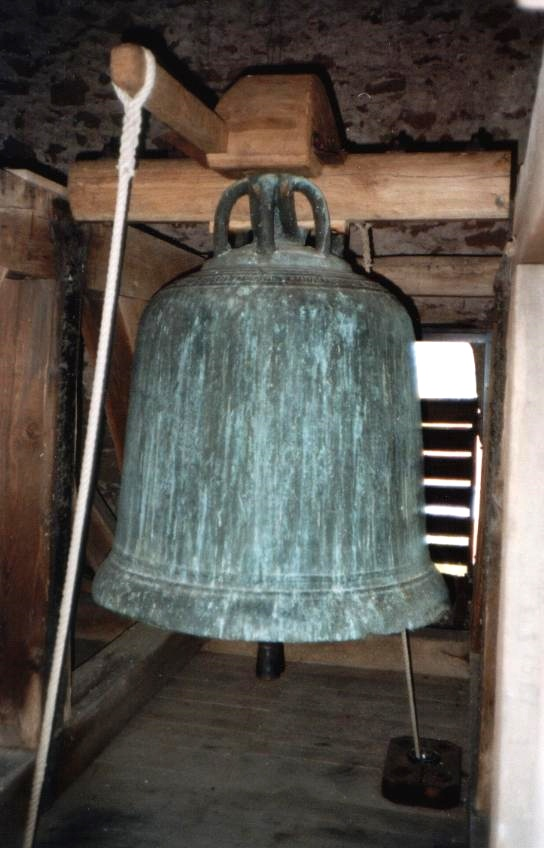
Lullusglocke, cast in 1038, in monastery of Bad Hersfeld in Hesse, Germany

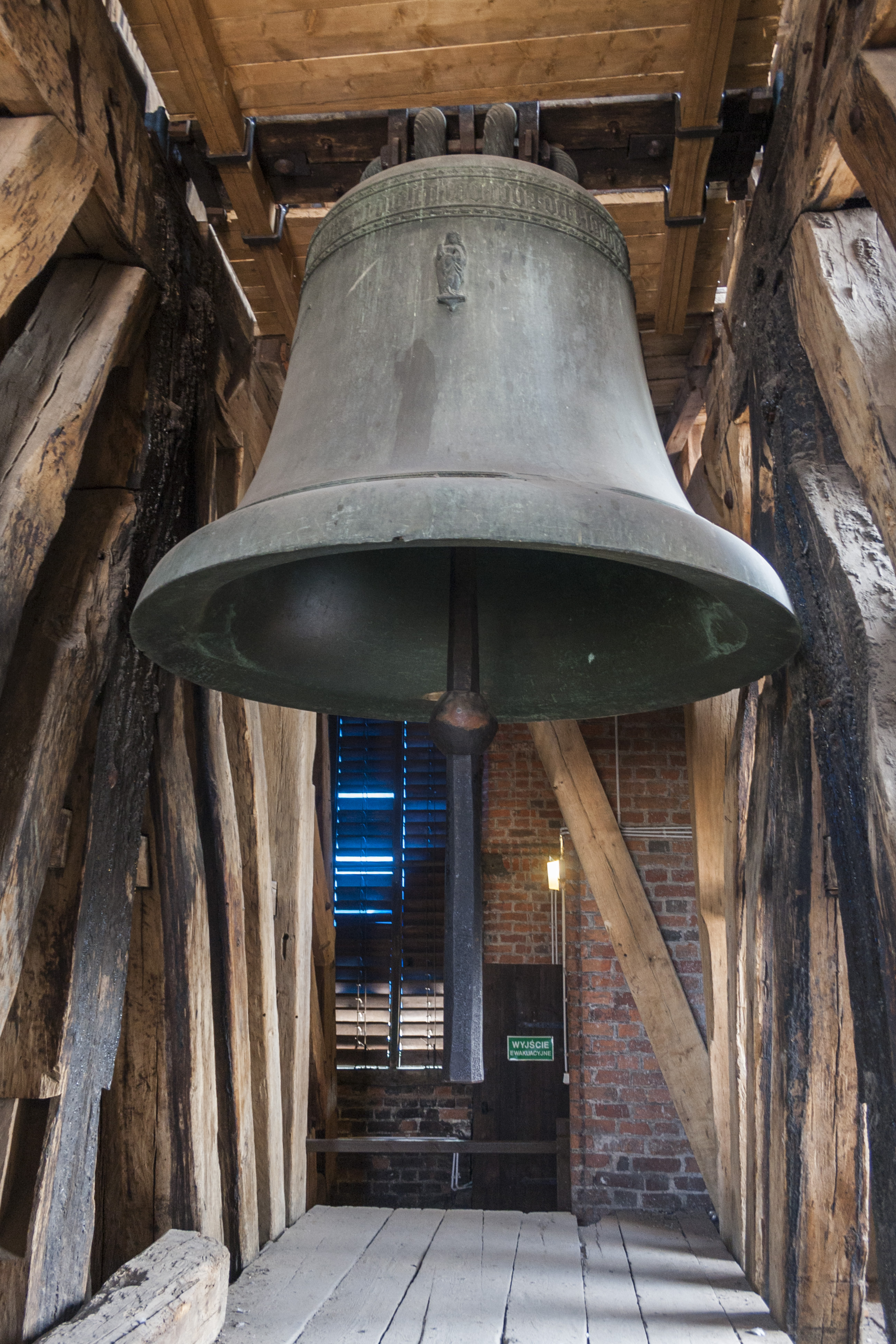
Tuba Dei bell in Cathedral in Toruń, Poland, cast in 1500

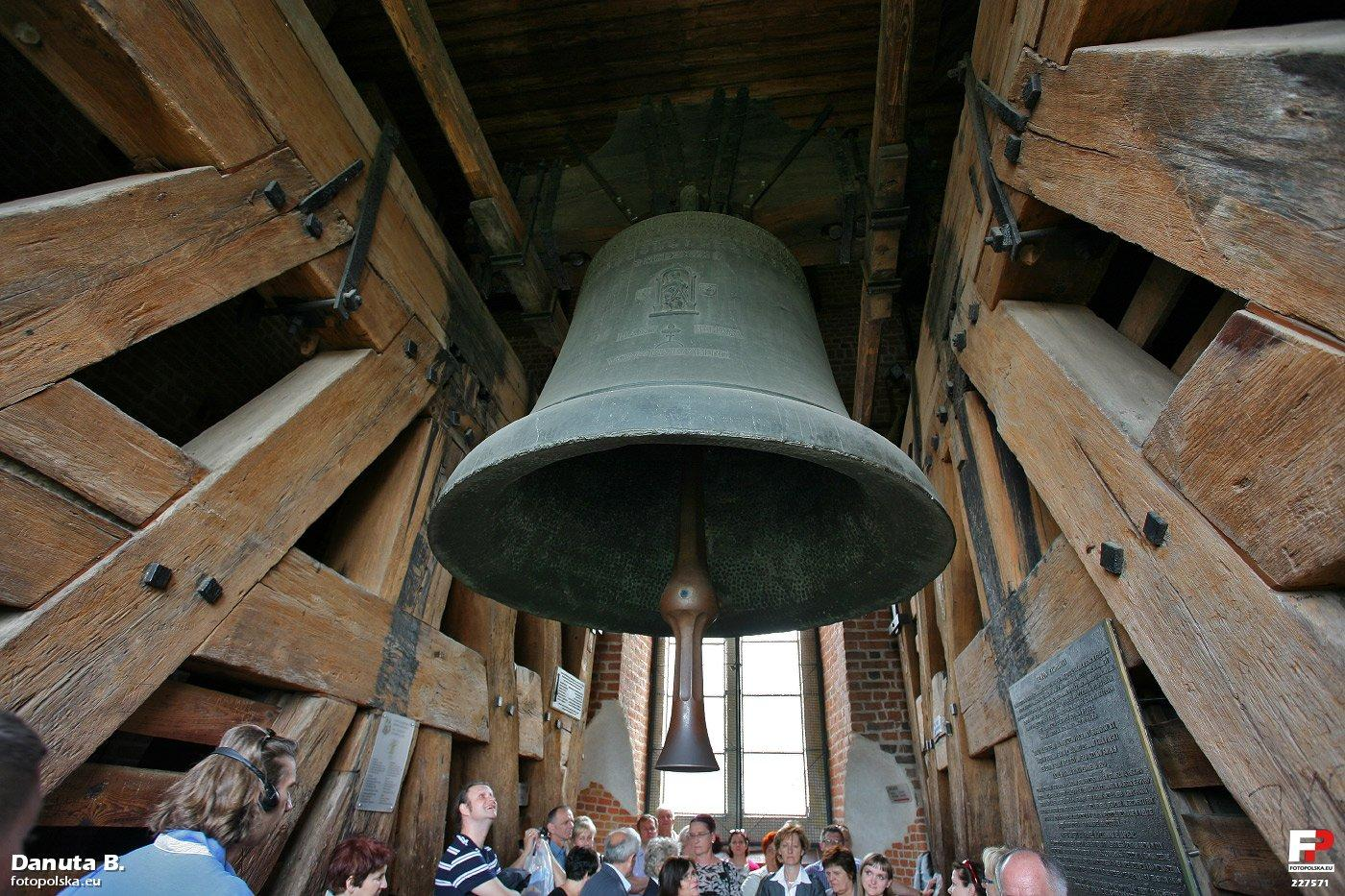
Sigismund Bell in Kraków, Poland, cast in 1520 by Hans Beham

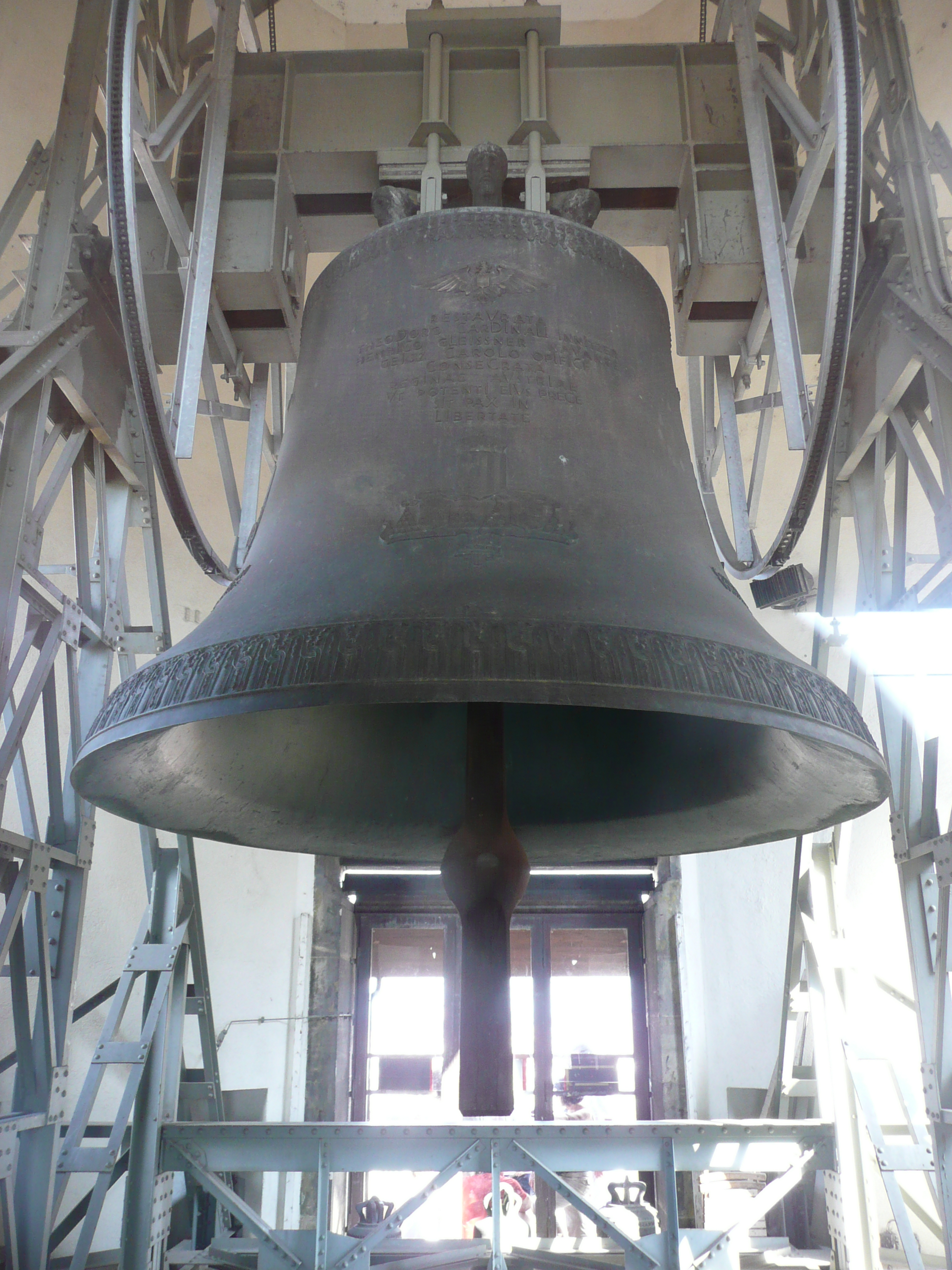
Pummerin in Stephansdom, Vienna

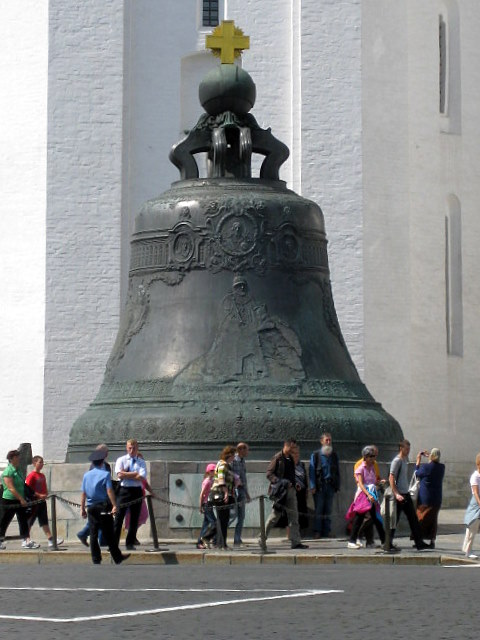
Tsar Bell in Moscow, Russia, the heaviest existing bell in the world (over 196 tons)

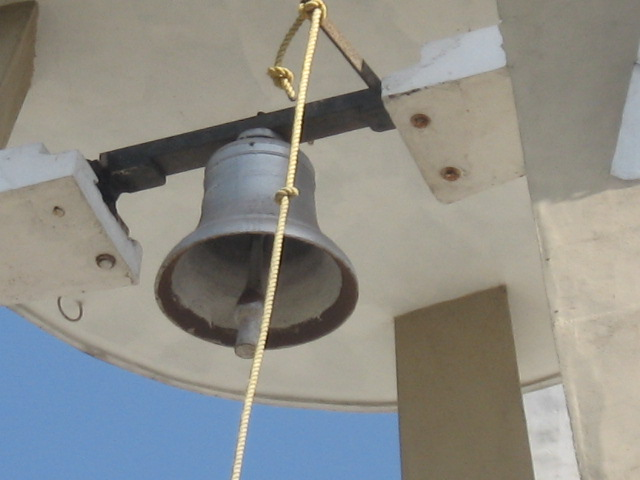
Belgian-made bell of St. Xavier's Church, Peyad, Trivandrum, Kerala, India

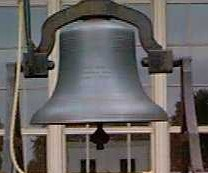
Bell in the Cathedral Church of Saint Matthew, Dallas, Texas

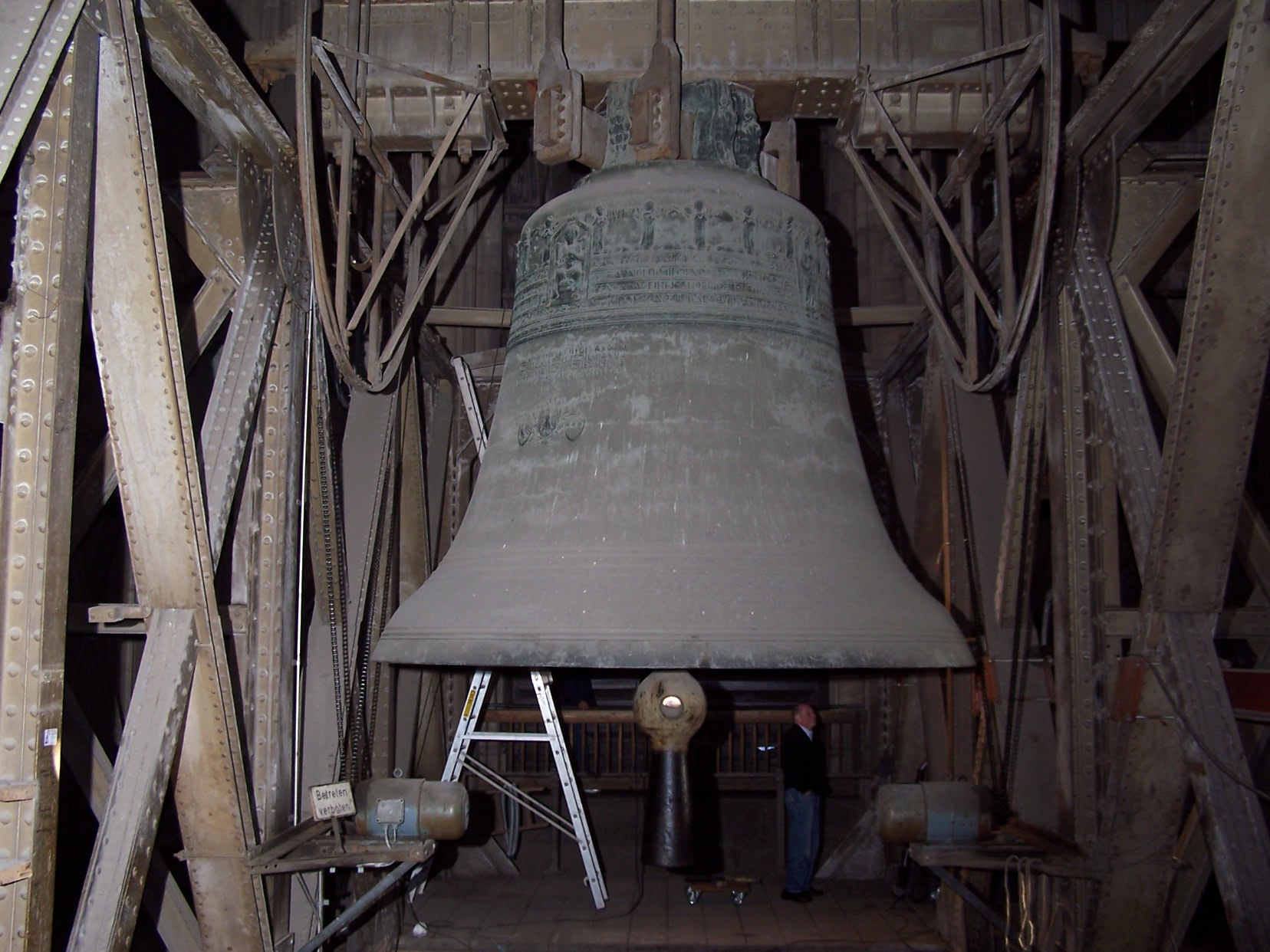
Bell in Cologne Cathedral

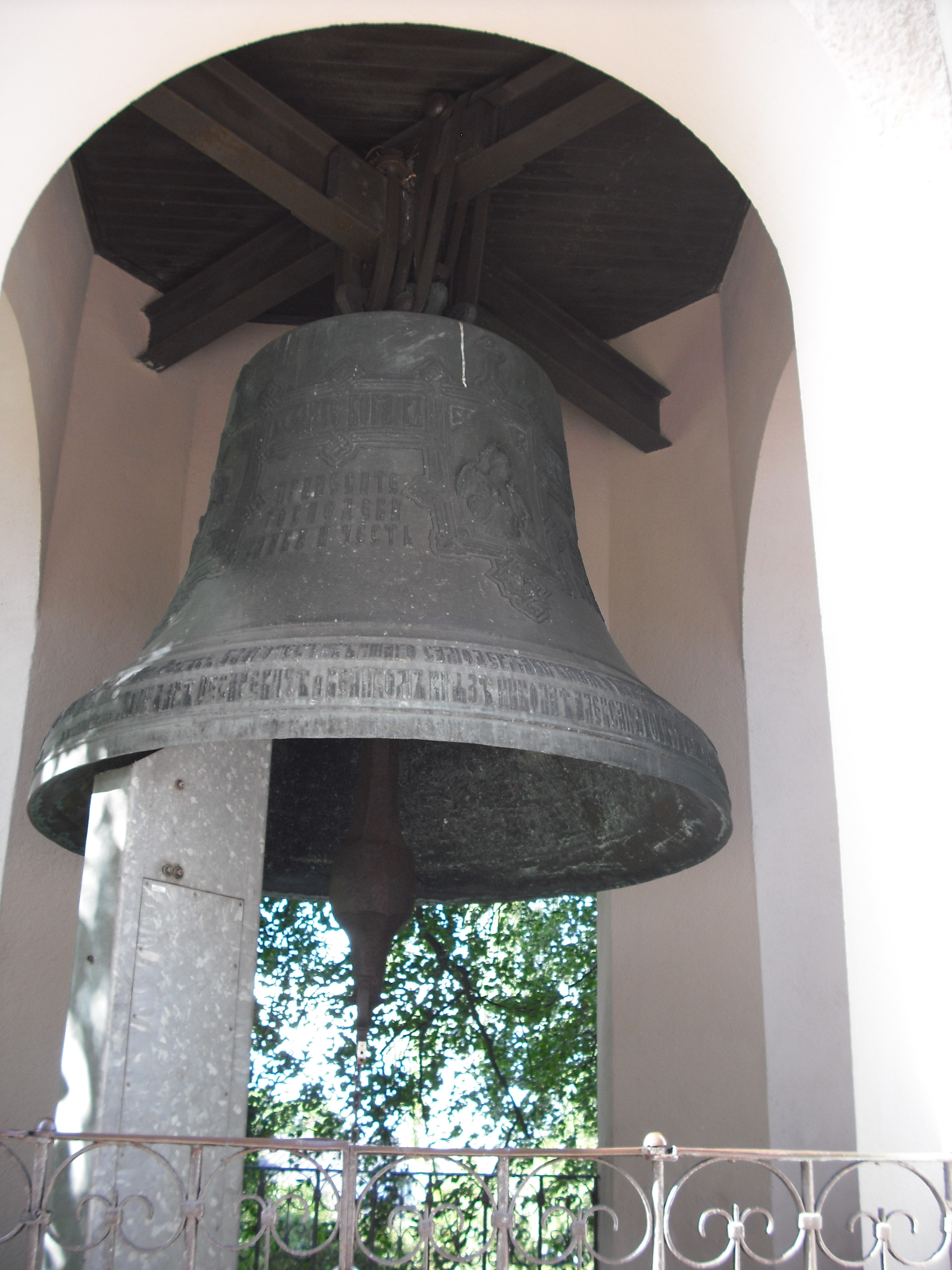
Bell in Suomenlinna Church

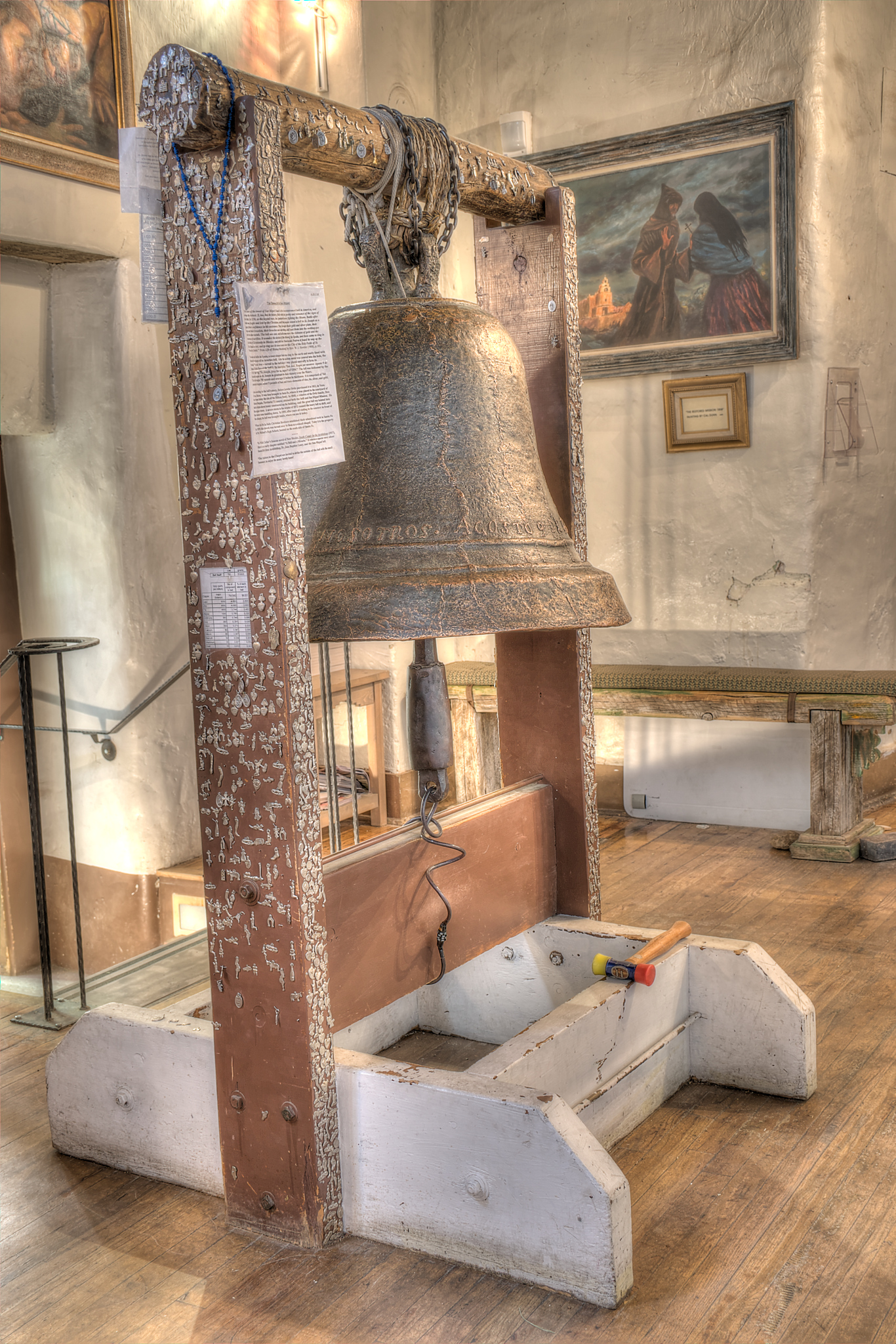
Bell for San Miguel Mission

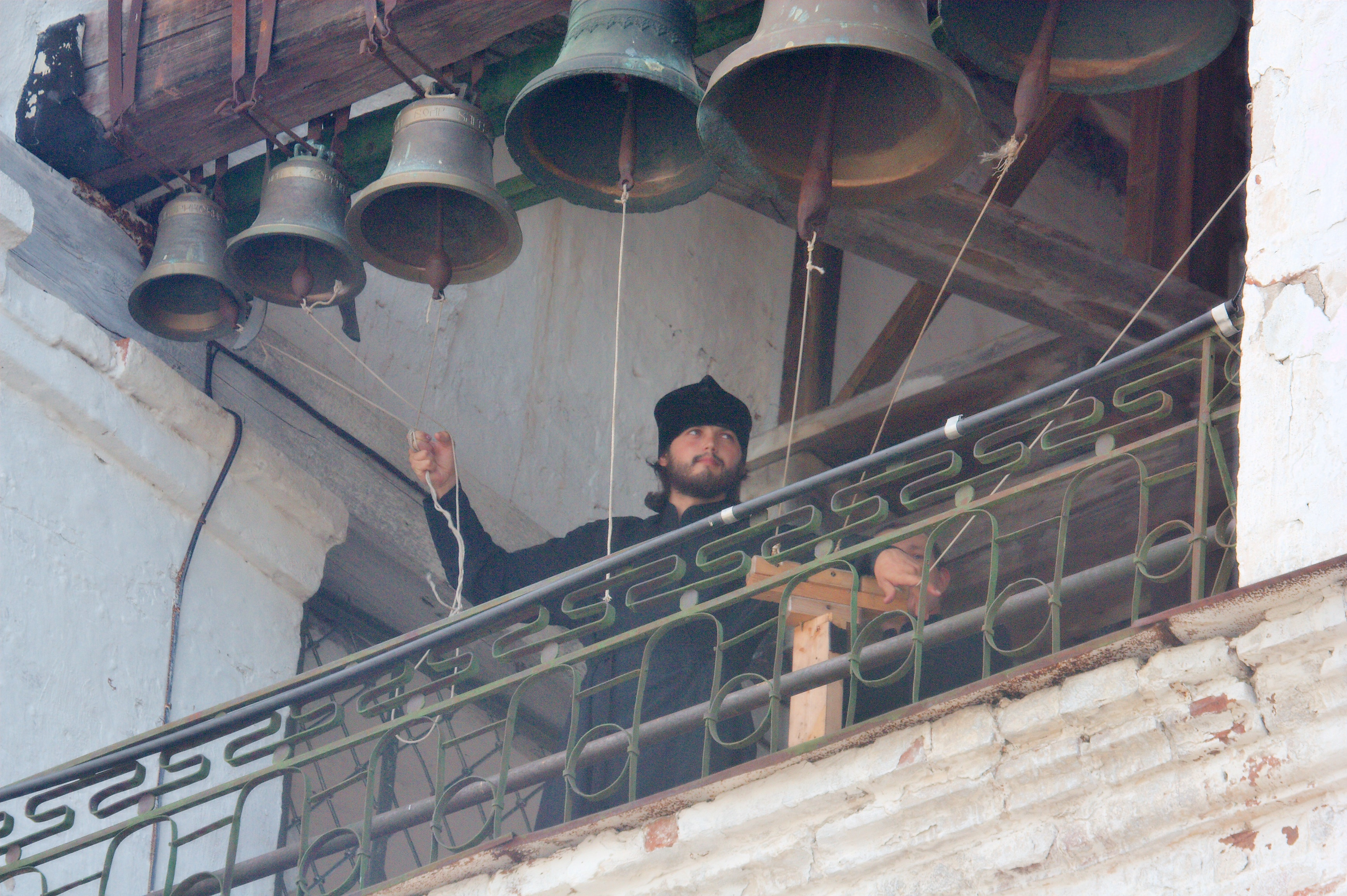
Ringing the bells at Ipatiev Monastery in Kostroma, Russia.

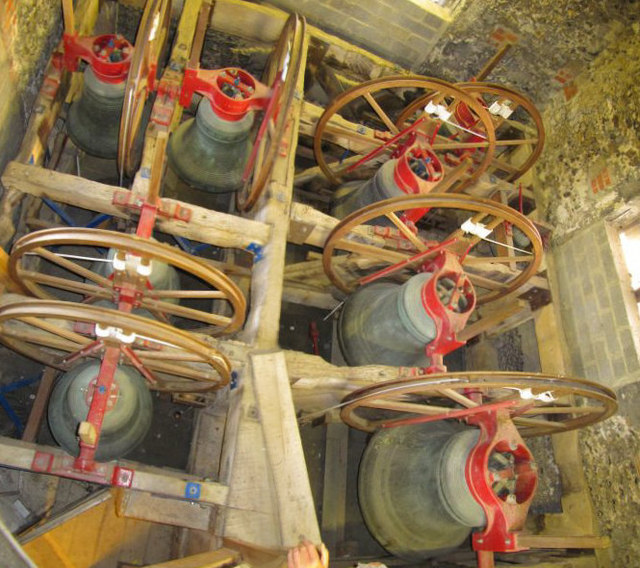
Ring of eight bells in the tower of St Michael and All Angels' parish church, Blewbury, Oxfordshire

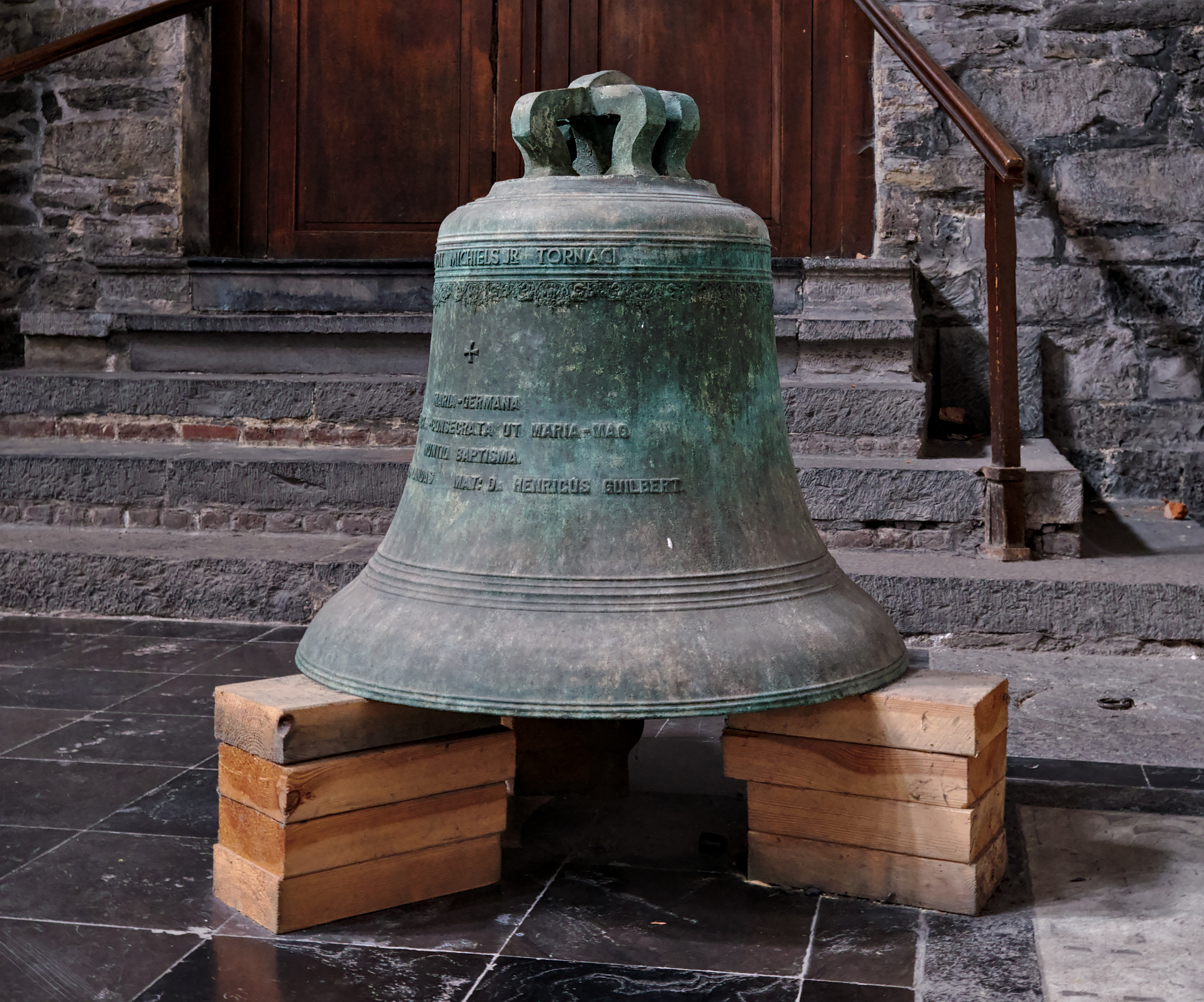
Bell in the Saint-Jacques church of Tournai

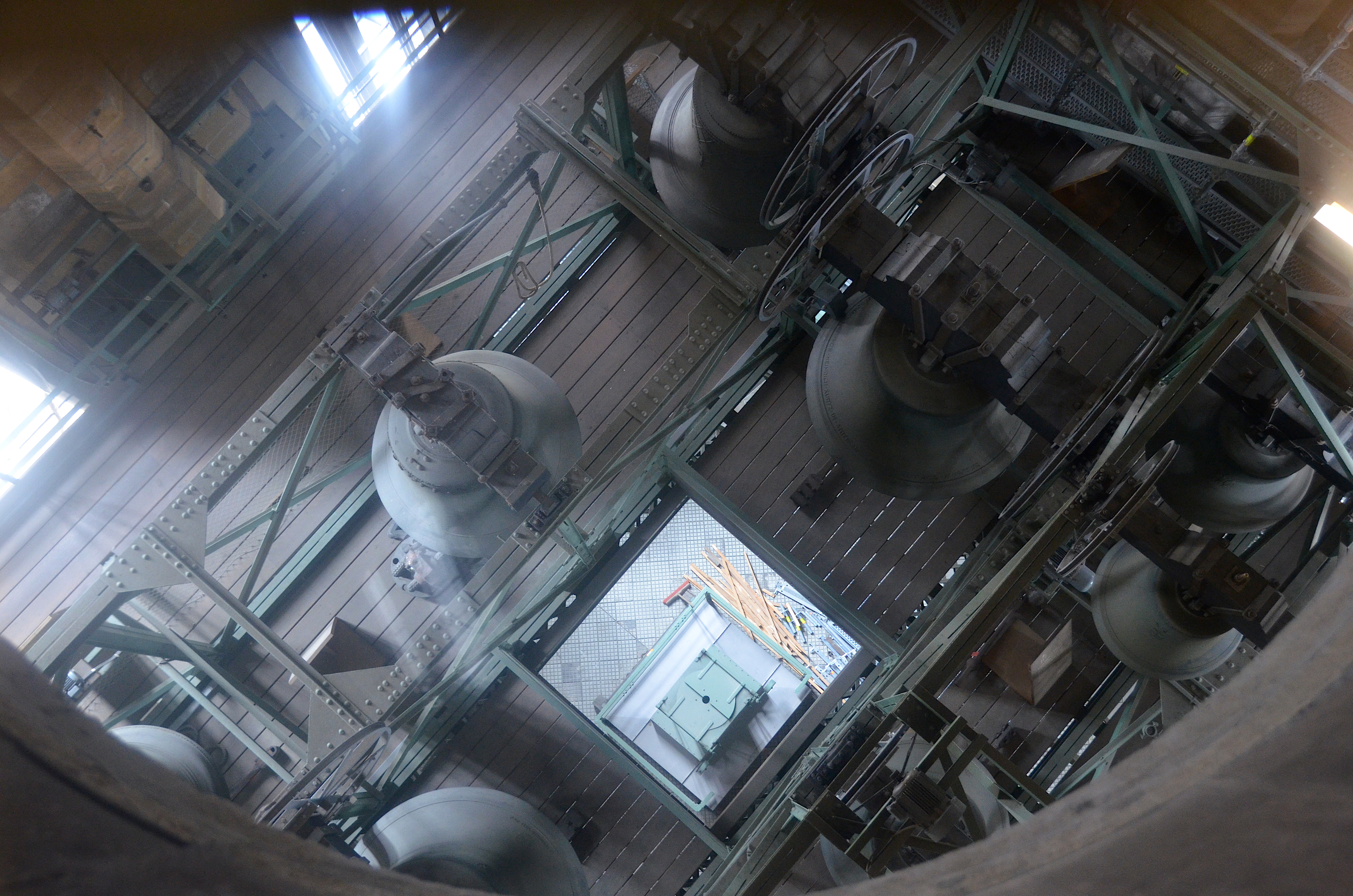
Church bells of Ulm Minster seen from above (2019)

== See also ==
- Bellfounding
- Bolognese bell ringing art
- Campanology
- Central Council of Church Bell Ringers
- Change ringing
- Handbells
- Loudspeakers in mosques
- Ring of bells
- Russian Orthodox bell ringing
- Veronese bellringing art
- Bonshō
