= Obergeis =

Coordinates: 50°54′N 9°36′E

Obergeis is a village in the municipality of Neuenstein, district Hersfeld-Rotenburg in the German State of Hesse.
