= St. Xavier's Church, Peyad =

St.Xavier's Church, Peyad,Trivandrum
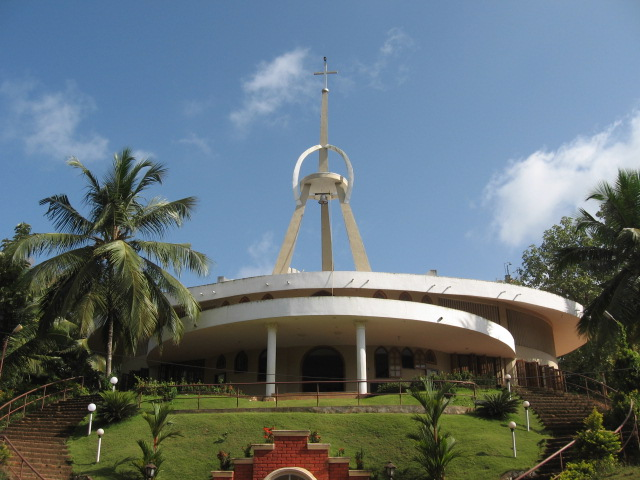
- Exterior View
- St.Xavier's Church, Peyad,Trivandrum
- Location: Trivandrum, Kerala, India
- Denomination: Roman Catholic

History
- Status: Parish

Architecture
- Completed: 2006

Specifications
- Materials: Rock, bricks, cement, steel, wood

Administration
- Diocese: Neyyattinkara

Clergy
- Priest: Rev. Fr. Justin Dominic

The St. Xavier's Church is a Roman Catholic Church run by the Roman Catholic Diocese of Neyyattinkara. Diocese of Neyyattinkara was formed on 5 November 1996 and prior to the formation of Diocese of Neyyattinkara, St.Xavier's Church Peyad was under the control of Metropolitan Arch Diocese of Thiruvananthapuram. The church follows Latin Rite.

== Overview ==
Saint Francis Xavier, born Francisco de Jaso y Azpilcueta (7 April 1506, Javier, Navarre – 3 December 1552, Shangchuan Island, China) was a Navarrese pioneering Roman Catholic missionary of Basque origin and co-founder of the Society of Jesus. He had visited India for missionary purpose.

== Parish history ==
The church claims its origin to the pre-independence days. Rev.Fr.John Damisien, the father of Neyyattinkara mission, founded in 1901, founded Kundamanbhagam Mission which was under control of the parish of Palayam. Further missionary work, by Rev.Fr.Gregory OCD and Rev.Fr.Pascasious OCD resulted in the beginning of the church's construction in 1904 at Kundamanbhagam. Missionaries of Carmelite belonging to the Asters Province in Belgium helped. Though the region was remote, the feast of St. Sebastian attracted believers. Furthermore, records reveal that Dr. Alosious Maria Benzigar, the Bishop of Quilon visited Kundamanbhagam mission and upon his suggestion the missionaries rebuilt the church of St. Francis Xavier at Peyad. It bears a combination of Greek and Roman architecture and has a Church Bell brought by Fr.Pascasious OCD from Belgium and it is one among the 44 Church Bells belonging to the same make. The Missionaries from Belgium selected an engineer from Belgium and native Kunju Contractor to complete the shrine. The present residence for the priest was built during the time of Fr. Brocard OCD In those days St.Xavier Church at Peyad was known as a Partial district comprising Kundamanbhagam. As per Ora Malabaria the diocese of Thiruvananthapuram originated in 1937 July 1 with Rev.Fr.Vincent Dereire as the first Bishop of Thiruvananthapuram who established 15 High Schools, 28 Middle Schools and 68 Primary schools.

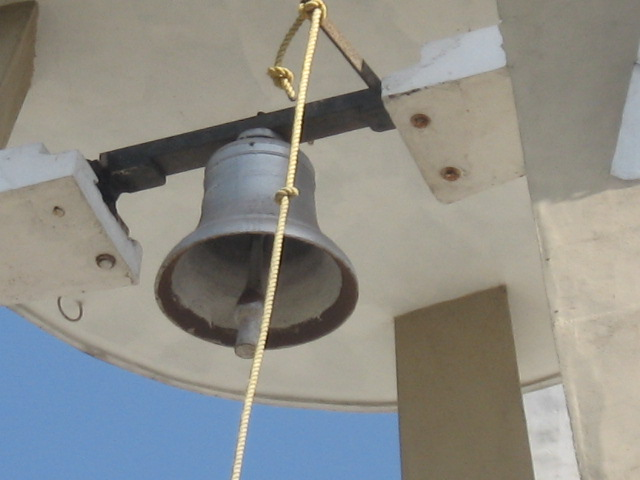
The Belgium Bell

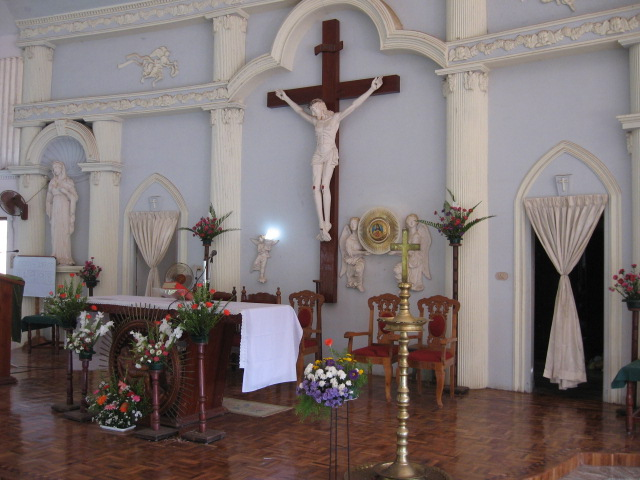
The Main Altar
