= Lullusglocke =

Oldest datable cast bell in Germany

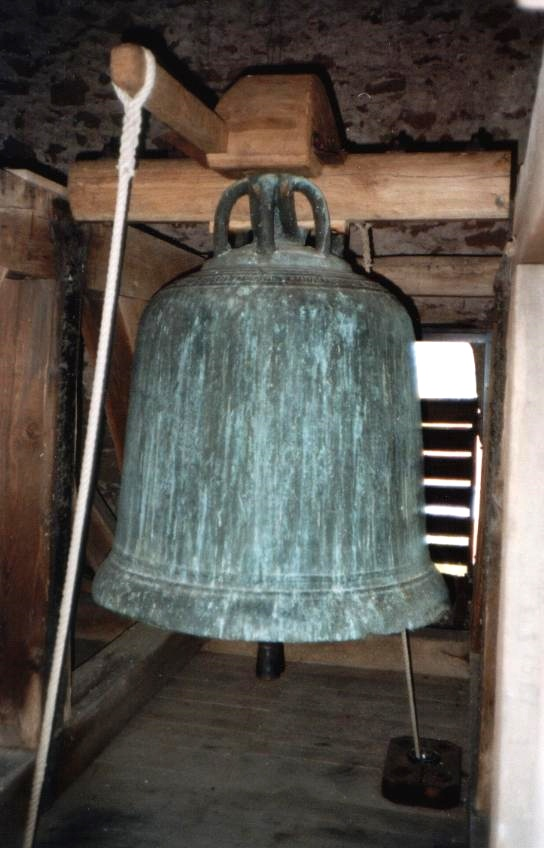

The sound of the Lullusglocke

The Lullusglocke is the oldest datable cast bell in Germany. (Note: An older bell exists, named Saufang, but it is made from three iron plates riveted together) The inscription indicates it was cast on 24 June 1038. It hangs in the Catherine Tower (German: Katharinenturm) in the ruins of the monastery of Bad Hersfeld in Hesse.

In 2002 the bell tower was repaired by the Friends of the Stiftsruine (monastery ruins). As part of the works, the old clapper was removed and hung in the Stadtsmuseum. A new clapper has been fitted and the bell can now be rung. The bell is suspended from a new yoke and is rung by pulling on ropes.

== History ==
For centuries the Lullus bell was rung at the beginning of Lullusfest, a folk festival held in Hersfield. The festival commemorates Saint Lullus (born about 710 in Wessex, England) who was the first Abbot of Hersfeld Abbey, Germany and the first archbishop of Mainz. He died 16 October 786 in Hersfeld. Eventually the bell acquired its name from the festival. Until the renovation of 2002, the bell was also rung only once a year, at the start of the festival. Since then however, it has been rung on special occasions. It is rung at Christmas, Easter, Whitsun and the Lullus festival.

== Description ==
The bell is 1,070 millimetres (42 in) high (excluding the crown) and 1,120 millimetres (44 in) in diameter. The weight is approximately 1,000 kilograms (2,200 lb). The sound is principally two notes beating together: B0 and C1. (Note: Reference to the German text will show H0 and C1. German convention is to label B♭ as "B" and B♮ as "H". See Letter notation)

The bell is approximately tubular with vertical sides and a very small sound bow. The top of the bell is domed. Around the shoulder are three ridges, between the outermost two is an inscription. A further string is cast in just above the sound bow. The bell is suspended from cannons (cast in hoops).

The cannons are attached to a beam, the headstock. Fixed to the top of the beak are two poles, one of which can be seen in the attached photograph. A rope hangs from the outboard end of each pole and runs through a hole in the floor to the ringers below. The ringers pull on the ropes alternately to swing the bell to and fro.

=== Inscription ===
The inscription is not completely clear. It is based on Latin, but with conventional abbreviations. There is no marked start of the inscription. In one area, changes to the mould prior to casting have erased the text. The visible text reads:

FVDIT.. .. NDIDIT.R.NEATIVER.E IS.V GWENON HOC VAS ABBATI NONENSE .. IS BAP..E SDANE DEO MARENDAD MEGINHARIO

There is some dispute over the interpretation of the text. The "SD" in "SDANE" is thought to be an "M". Reconstructed the text appears to be three hexameters:

FVDIT ME CONDIDIT TRINITATI VERAE IVS SV
GWENON HOC VAS ABBATI NONENSE SECVNDI ANNI
IS BAPTISTA MANE. DEO, MARENDA, D MEGHINHARIO

The second year of Abbot Meginhar was 1038 and the bell would appear to have been poured on the feast day of John the Baptist (24 June).
