= Knüllwald =

- Municipality
- Coat of arms

- Location of Knüllwald within Schwalm-Eder-Kreis district
- Interactive map of Knüllwald
- Location within Germany Location within Hesse
- Coordinates: 50°59′N 09°29′E
- Country: Germany
- State: Hesse
- Admin. region: Kassel
- District: Schwalm-Eder-Kreis

Government
  - Mayor (2017–23): Jürgen Roth

Area
  - Total: 100.68 km^{2} (38.87 sq mi)
- Elevation: 253–553 m (830–1,814 ft)

Population (2025-12-31)
  - Total: 4,419
  - Density: 43.89/km^{2} (113.7/sq mi)
- Time zone: UTC+01:00 (CET)
  - Summer (DST): UTC+02:00 (CEST)
- Postal codes: 34593
- Dialling codes: 05685
- Vehicle registration: HR
- Website: www.knuellwald.de

Knüllwald is a municipality in the Schwalm-Eder district in Hesse, Germany.

== Geography ==
=== Location ===
Knüllwald lies in the Knüllgebirge, a low mountain range, between the rivers Efze and Beise, south of Kassel.

=== Constituent communities ===
The community consists of sixteen centres: Appenfeld, Berndshausen, Ellingshausen, Hausen, Hergetsfeld, Lichtenhagen, Nausis, Nenterode, Niederbeisheim, Oberbeisheim, Reddingshausen, Remsfeld (administrative seat), Rengshausen, Schellbach, Völkershain and Wallenstein.

== History ==
The formation of the greater community of Knüllwald came about in stages as part of Hesse's municipal reforms.

On 31 December 1971, the communities of Appenfeld, Ellingshausen, Hergetsfeld, Oberbeisheim, Reddingshausen, Remsfeld, Schellbach, Völkershain and Wallenstein voluntarily combined to form the new community of Knüllwald. Likewise, on the same day, the communities of Hausen, Lichtenhagen, Nausis, Nenterode and Rengshausen voluntarily combined to form the new community of Rengshausen.

By state law on 1 January 1974, the communities of Berndshausen, Niederbeisheim and Rengshausen were amalgamated with the already extant greater community of Knüllwald, thereby forming one of Hesse's biggest polycentric communities.

== Partner towns ==
- Hungary, Dömsöd (Pest county)
