= Aua (Neuenstein) =

- Ortsteil of Neuenstein
- Interactive map of Aua
- Location within Germany Location within Hesse
- Coordinates: 50°55′N 09°34′E
- Country: Germany
- State: Hesse
- District: Hersfeld-Rotenburg
- Municipality: Neuenstein

Area
  - Total: 3.96 km^{2} (1.53 sq mi)
- Elevation: 295 m (968 ft)

Population (2016)
  - Total: 176
  - Density: 44.4/km^{2} (115/sq mi)
- Time zone: UTC+01:00 (CET)
  - Summer (DST): UTC+02:00 (CEST)
- Postal codes: 36286
- Dialling codes: 06677

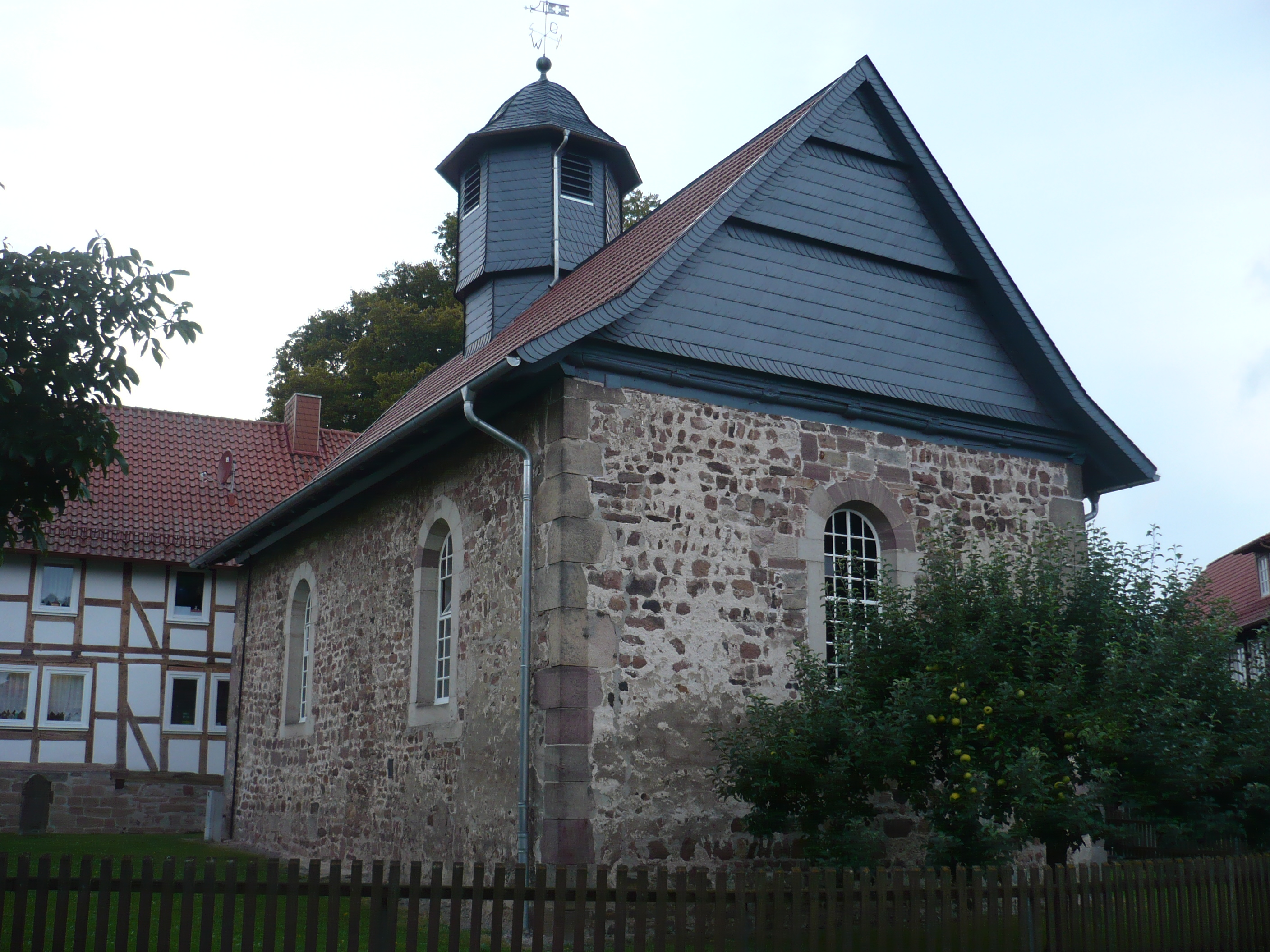
Former monastery

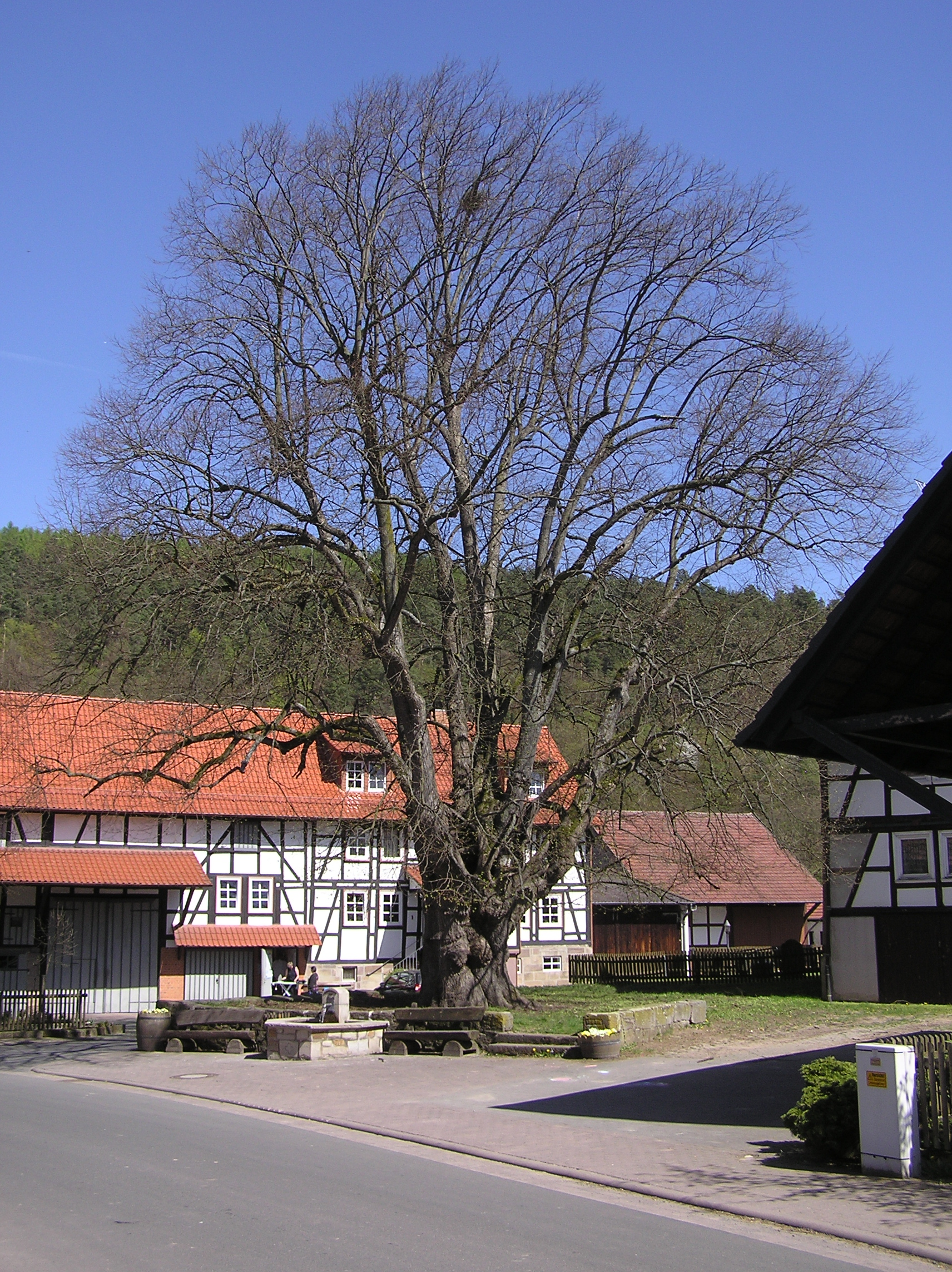
The village's tilia, roughly 1200 years old

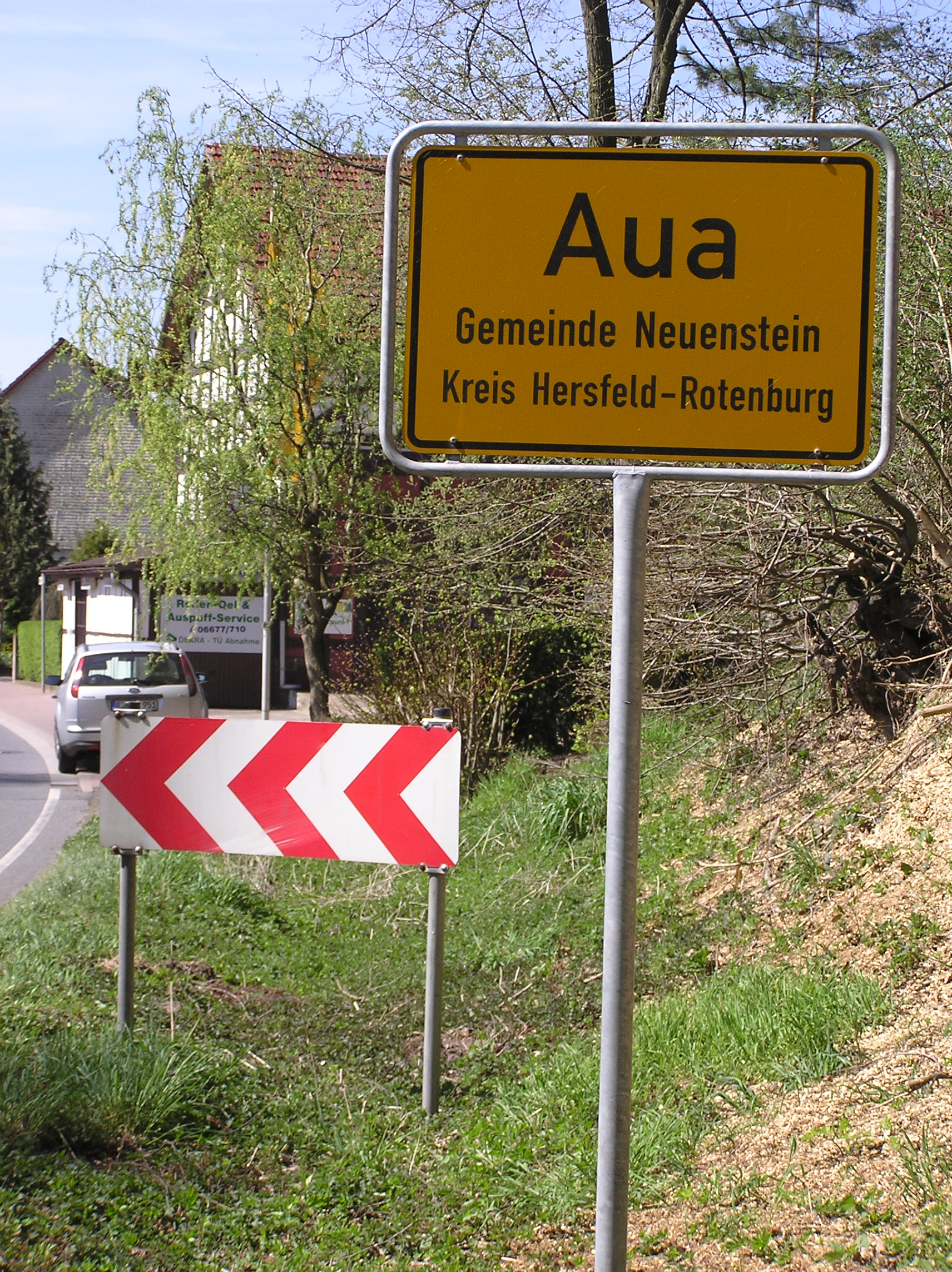
Entrance of Aua

Aua is a village (Ortsteil) of Neuenstein in Hesse, Germany. The local government of Neuenstein is based here.

== Traffic ==
Aua has access to the A 7 which is located to the west of the village. The on-ramp Bad Hersfeld-West is located to the south. Within Aua, there is an interchange between federal highway (Bundesstraße) 324 and state roads (Landesstraßen) 3153 and 3155.

Public transport is accessible through bus line 370, maintained by RKH Bus GmbH.

== History ==
First mentioned in 852, the place's name was Owe. It was founded in 1190 by the Abbey Hersfeld. The abbey was a monastery of the Augustinians which was relocated to Blankenheim in 1229. The Protestant church is the former church of this monastery.

On 31 December 1971 Aua was incorporated into the new community Neuenstein.

== Attractions ==
- former monastery church, today's Protestant church with a baptismal font with two heads dating back to around 1200
- the village's lime tree, roughly 1200 years old
