= Atlantic University Alliance =

The Atlantic University Alliance is an association of three universities on the Atlantic coast of Ireland. It presently comprises the University of Galway, the University of Limerick and University College, Cork (UCC).
