= Aua (band) =

Experimental duo from Germany

AUA
- Origin: Leipzig, Wiesbaden
- Genres: Krautrock; Neo-Psychedelia; Alternative Rock
- Years active: 2019–present
- Labels: Crazysane Records
- Members: Henrik Eichmann; Fabian Bremer
- Website: aua.cool

AUA (stylized in all caps) is an experimental duo from Germany that consists of Henrik Eichmann and Fabian Bremer. The duo released their debut album I Don’t Want It Darker in 2020. Since then, they released The Damaged Organ (2022) and Painkiller No. 1 (2024). Their music has been described as “an eclectic mix of explosive krautrock-driven beats, Carpenter-esque arpeggios, and surf guitar sounds, all embedded within the darker version of a ’60s lo-fi pop record.”

== History ==
Fabian Bremer and Henrik Eichmann, both multi-instrumentalists, began recording together after two decades of prior collaboration in other projects, most notably the instrumental band Radare. AUA's music is written and self-recorded in their home studios and remote locations, allowing for a high degree of control and experimentation in production. Since 2020, the band has closely collaborated with Belgrade-based artist Mihailo Kalabić, who created all of AUA’s album artworks to date, using his surreal, organic illustration style—often digitally rendered—to reflect the band’s themes and aesthetic.

Their debut album, I Don’t Want It Darker, was released in 2020 on Berlin-based label Crazysane Records. The record established the band’s foundational sound—an eclectic, lo-fi mix with dark pop undertones—and was met with positive critical reception. Guest musicians included Chris Breuer (Zahn, Heads), Dominik Fink (Radare), and Jörg Schumacher. The record was self-recorded, mixed and produced by the band, with mastering handled by Philipp Welsing at Original Mastering.

In 2022, the band released their second album, The Damaged Organ, which explored themes of alienation and identity. The music introduced a broader sonic scope, incorporating unusual electronic instruments and featuring guest vocals by Annika Henderson (Anika, Exploded View) on the track Islands Song. Most of the album’s basslines were once again co-written and recorded with Dominik Fink. Critics noted the album’s intricate textures and its stylistic evolution toward a unique “pop blueprint”. As with its predecessor, The Damaged Organ was recorded and mixed by the band themselves, with mastering once again done by Philipp Welsing.

Painkiller No. 1, released in 2024, marked the completion of a trilogy of full-length records. Featuring contributions by Sally Brown (Plattenbau, Anika), Jobst M. Feit (Radare, Death By Gong), and longtime collaborator Dominik Fink, the album was seen as AUA’s most sonically diverse and mature effort to date. Its combination of fragile vocals, dry drums, lo-fi textures, and psychedelic structures drew comparisons to Portishead and late-period Beatles. The album was released as a standalone LP as well as part of a limited 3×LP box set. Breaking with their earlier approach, Painkiller No. 1 was mixed and mastered by Magnus Wichmann at Lala Studios in Leipzig, while most of the recording and production remained in the band’s own hands.

In early 2025, AUA announced an upcoming series of EPs, with Painkiller No. 2 set to be the first release in fall 2025. It features tracks recorded during the sessions for their 2024 album Painkiller No. 1 that did not make it onto the final record. As a compilation, the material is noticeably more diverse and experimental than on the band’s previous three releases. In addition to Dominik Fink on bass, the single Ersatz Intercity features Charlotte Simon (Les Trucs) as a guest musician on vocals.

Since their first live performances in 2022, AUA have performed as a trio, with Steffen Smirny (La Petite Mort / Little Death) completing the lineup on bass.

== Musical style ==
AUA’s music blends motorik-driven rhythm sections with analog synthesizers, lo-fi guitars, and understated vocals. Their sound references a variety of artists and genres, drawing comparisons to Broadcast, Autolux, Beak, Kraftwerk, and Mort Garson. Their work often evokes cinematic and retro-futuristic imagery, with a production aesthetic that balances DIY rawness and polished detail.

== Discography ==
=== Albums ===
- I Don’t Want It Darker (Crazysane Records, 2020, LP / CD)
- The Damaged Organ (Crazysane Records, 2022, LP / MC)
- Painkiller No. 1 (Crazysane Records, 2024, LP / 3×LP box set)

=== EPs ===
- Painkiller No. 2 (Crazysane Records, 2025, MC)

== Videos ==
- I Don’t Want It Darker (compiled by Fabian Bremer, 2020)
- Friendo (directed by Nicolai Hildebrandt, 2021)
- Post Human Blossom (directed and animated by Mihailo Kalabić, 2021)
- Brick Break (directed by Henrik Eichmann, 2022)
- Trash Has Changed (compiled by Fabian Bremer, 2022)
- Terminal (animated by Mihailo Kalabić, compiled by Fabian Bremer, 2024)
- Allies (directed by Henrik Eichmann, 2024)
- Ersatz Intercity (directed by Henrik Eichmann, 2025)
