= Nentershausen =

Nentershausen may refer to:

- Nentershausen, Hesse
- Nentershausen, Rhineland-Palatinate
