= Rotenburg an der Fulda =

Rotenburg a. d. Fulda
- Town
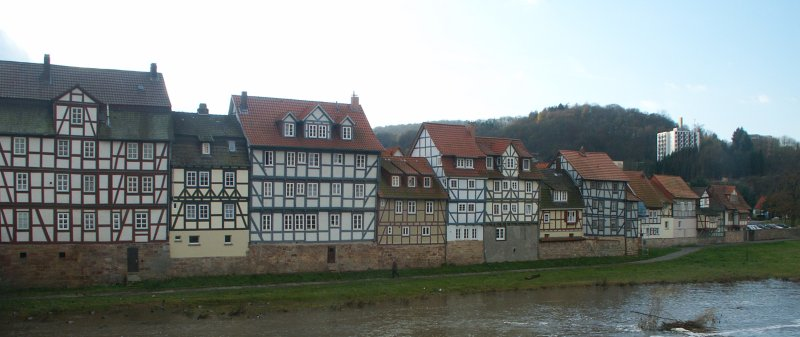
- Old houses in Rotenburg, facing the Fulda River

- Coat of arms

- Location of Rotenburg a. d. Fulda within Hersfeld-Rotenburg district
- Interactive map of Rotenburg a. d. Fulda
- Location within Germany Location within Hesse
- Coordinates: 50°59′46″N 9°43′40″E
- Country: Germany
- State: Hesse
- Admin. region: Kassel
- District: Hersfeld-Rotenburg
- Subdivisions: 8 districts

Government
  - Mayor (2023–29): Marcus Weber

Area
  - Total: 79.84 km^{2} (30.83 sq mi)
- Elevation: 183 m (600 ft)

Population (2025-12-31)
  - Total: 12,944
  - Density: 162.1/km^{2} (419.9/sq mi)
- Time zone: UTC+01:00 (CET)
  - Summer (DST): UTC+02:00 (CEST)
- Postal codes: 36199
- Dialling codes: 06623
- Vehicle registration: HEF, ROF
- Website: www.rotenburg.de

Rotenburg an der Fulda (German pronunciation: [ˈʁoːtn̩bʊʁk ʔan deːɐ̯ ˈfʊlda], lit. 'Rotenburg on the Fulda'; officially Rotenburg a.d. Fulda) is a town in Hersfeld-Rotenburg district in northeastern Hesse, in central Germany, situated, as the name says, on the river Fulda.

== Geography ==
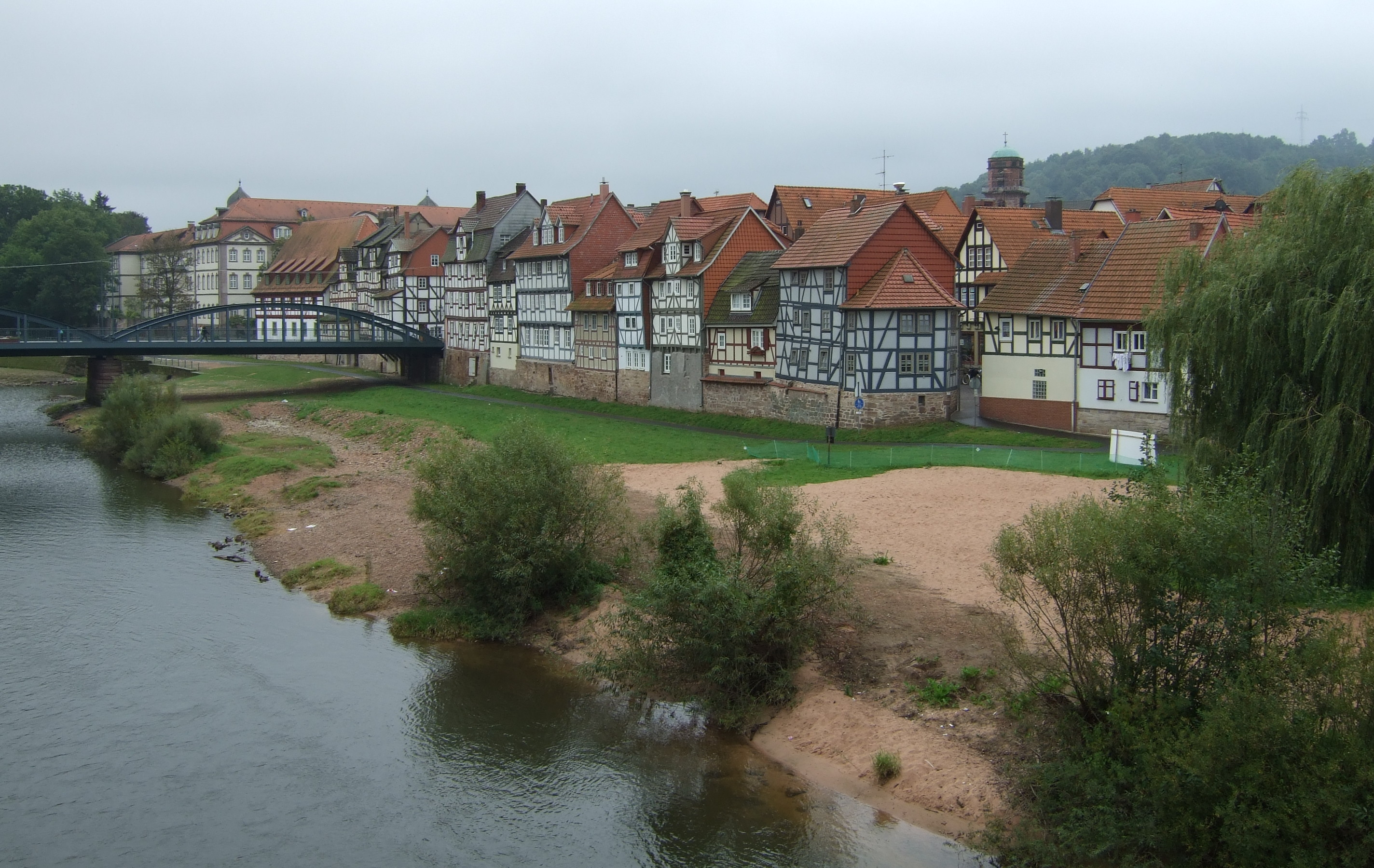
Historic row of houses in Rotenburg (an der Fulda)

=== Location ===
The town lies south of the Stölzinger Gebirge (range) in the narrowest part of the Fulda valley. The town's lowest point lies at 180 m above sea level in the area near the two bridges across the Fulda linking Rotenburg's Old Town and New Town; these are the Alte Fuldabrücke (“Old Fulda Bridge”) and the Brücke der Städtepartnerschaften (“Bridge of Town Partnerships”). The town's highest point is the 548.7 m-high Alheimer, lying on the town limit between Rotenburg and the neighbouring community of Alheim.

The nearest major towns are Bebra (some 6 km to the southeast) and Bad Hersfeld (some 16 km to the south), The nearest cities are Kassel (some 50 km to the north) and Fulda (some 70 km to the south).

=== Neighbouring communities ===
Clockwise from the north, these are Alheim, Spangenberg, Cornberg, Bebra and Ludwigsau. On the so-called Stölzinger Höhe (heights) in the northeast, above the outlying centre of Dankerode, Rotenburg has a boundary with the town of Waldkappel.

=== Constituent communities ===
Besides the main town, Rotenburg a.d. Fulda is made up of the outlying Stadtteile of Lispenhausen, Braach, Schwarzenhasel, Erkshausen, Seifertshausen, Dankerode, Atzelrode (with Alte Teich Estate and Wüstefeld) and Mündershausen.

== History ==
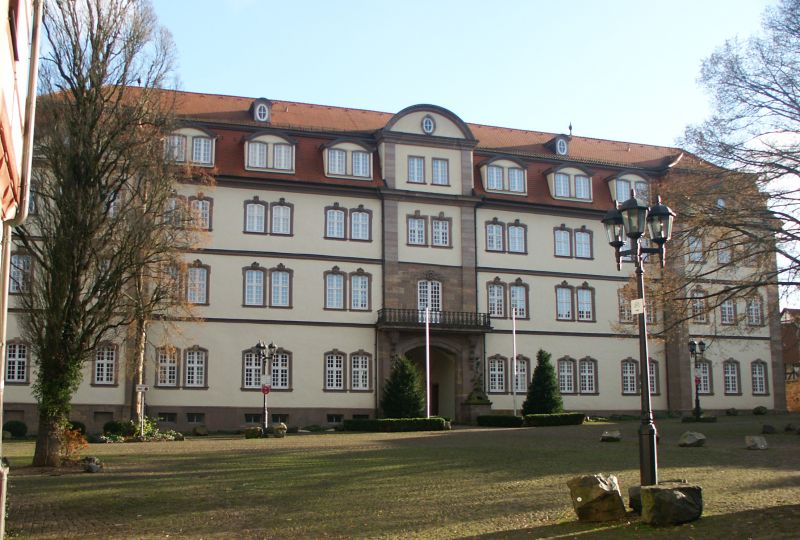
Landgrave's palace in Rotenburg, front view of main building

In 769, the outlying centres of Braach and Lispenhausen, along with the now vanished village of Breitingen (which lay somewhere near the Hochmahle) had their first documentary mentions in the Hersfeld Abbey’s directory of holdings. These consisted of six estates and 90 Morgen of land.

The Gisonen were the Abbey’s Vögte (singular: Vogt). They built the first security castle in the Fulda valley once they had come to hold the Vogtei (the right to be Vogt). Around this castle arose a settlement. The Landgraves of Thuringia, who inherited the Vogtei from the Gisonen, built on the Alter Turm (mountain) Rodenberg Castle, which today lies in ruins, but is believed to be the town’s namesake.

The settlement on the Fulda’s left bank, today’s Altstadt (“Old Town”), had its first documentary mention as a town in 1248, and after the Thuringian-Hessian War of Succession in 1264 the town belonged to the Landgraviate of Hesse. The old castle in the valley had supposedly been removed sometime after 1423. In 1470 arose the first Schloss Rotenburg. A great town fire destroyed the Old Town in 1478 along with the newly built Schloss. Between 1627 and 1834, Rotenburg was a residence town of the landgrave family of Hesse-Rotenburg, the so-called Rotenburger Quart.

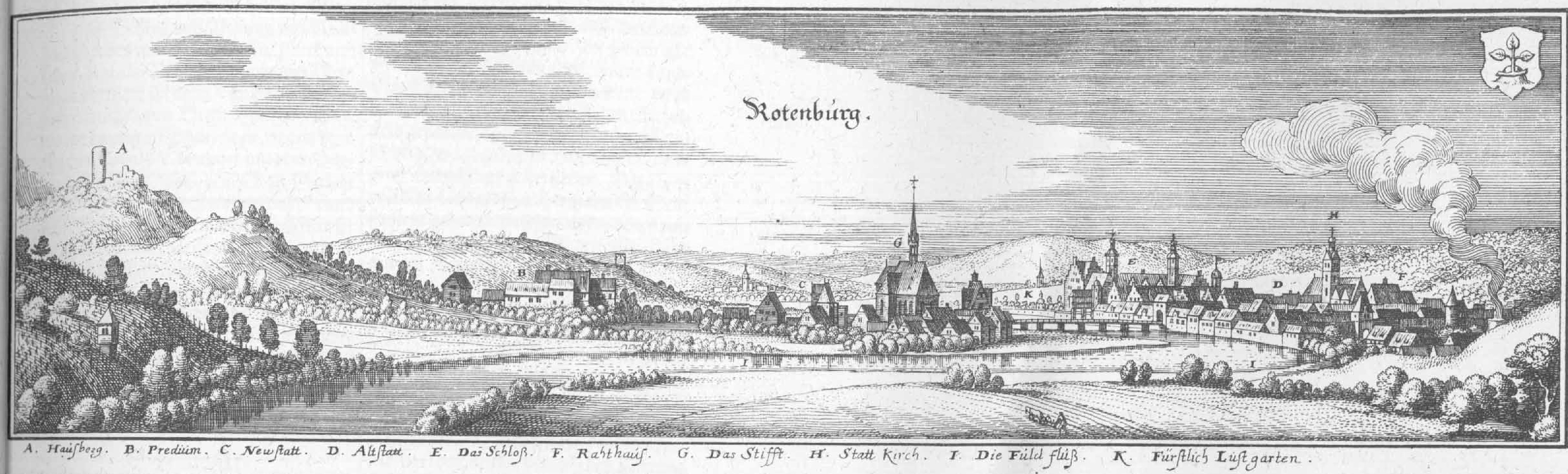
Rotenburg in an engraving by Matthäus Merian from 1655

In 1615, 57 houses burnt down in Braach, and in the Thirty Years' War, in 1637, the town and the town hall burnt. The fire was set by soldiers from the Isolani Regiment. In March 1882, the volunteer fire brigade was started as a club. In 1900 it acquired an equipment shed with a drying tower near the Fulda.

Following the joint German-Soviet invasion of Poland, which started World War II in 1939, it was the location of the Oflag IX-C prisoner-of-war camp for Polish officers and orderlies, which in June 1940 was converted into a subcamp of the Oflag IX-A camp in Spangenberg, and then held Belgian officers. Rotenburg has belonged since 1972 to Hersfeld-Rotenburg district, before which it was the old Rotenburg district's seat. In 2003, the town earned unwanted fame through Armin Meiwes, a former computer repair technician who cannibalised a voluntary victim in 2001 and was arrested in 2002.

In 2004, the town earned a silver medal in the national contest Unsere Stadt blüht auf (“Our Town is Blossoming”), and in 2005 it earned a gold medal with a special prize for the landscaping design of the Fulda floodplain.

In August 2007, the volunteer fire brigade staged the 20th Hessian Fire Brigade Day with an extensive programme of events on the occasion of its 125 anniversary of founding.

=== Religion ===
There are ten Evangelical churches in town, two Catholic churches and one New Apostolic.

=== Amalgamations ===
Through municipal reform in 1972, the above-named formerly self-administering communities were integrated into the town of Rotenburg an der Fulda.

== Politics ==
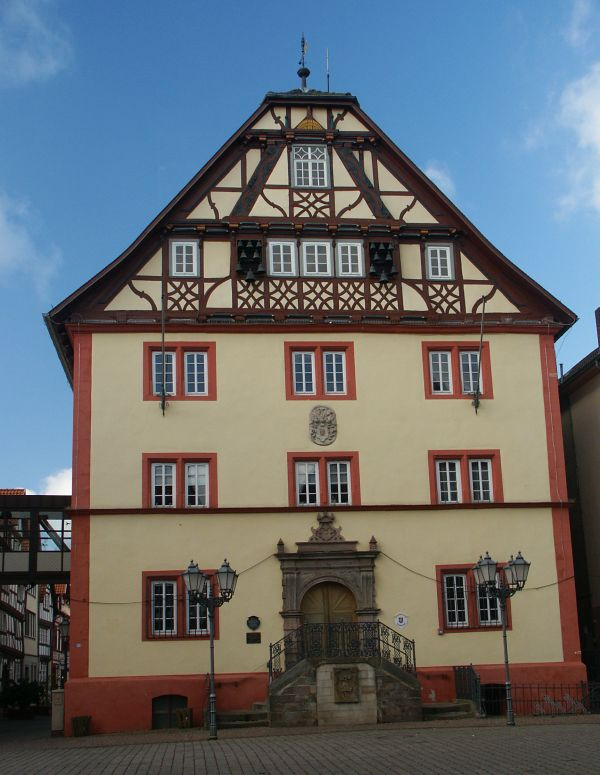
Rotenburg's Town Hall (built between 1597 and 1598)

=== Town council ===
The municipal election held on 26 March 2006 yielded the following results:

Parties and voter communities		% 2006	Seats; 2006	% 2001	Seats; 2001
CDU	Christian Democratic Union of Germany	35.9	13	37.7	14
SPD	Social Democratic Party of Germany	51.8	19	50.4	19
FDP	Free Democratic Party	2.0	1	2.5	1
UBR	Unabhängige Bürger Rotenburgs	10.3	4	9.3	3
Total		100.0	37	100.0	37
Voter turnout in %		48.2		56.2	

The town's executive (Magistrat) is made up of six councillors, including the mayor, with four seats allotted to the SPD and two to the CDU.

=== Mayor ===
The mayor is Marcus Weber, elected in 2023.

=== Coat of arms ===
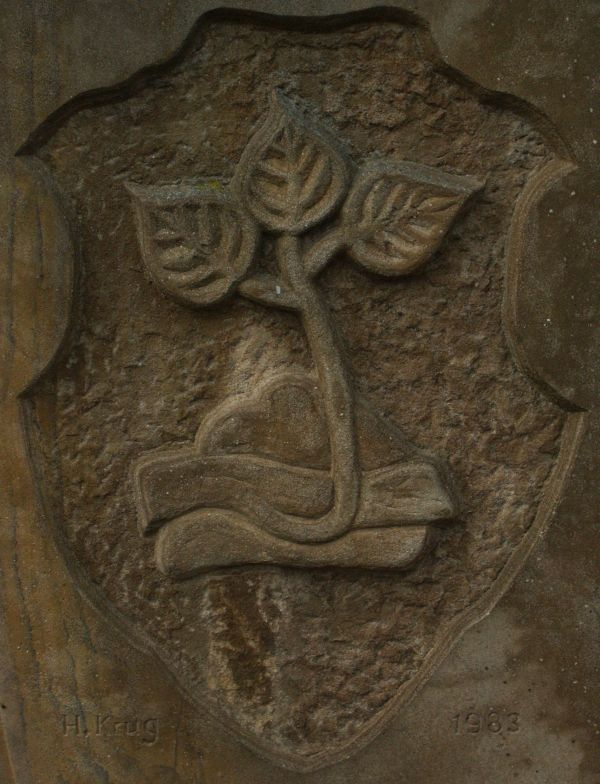
Town's coat of arms on the Town Hall steps in Rotenburg

The town's arms might be described thus: Argent at the nombril point a mount of three gules surmounted by a bough vert in fess arising from the bottom of which and growing in pale a sprig of three linden leaves vert.

The German blazon describes the “mount” as a Dreiberg, even though in the artistic rendering seen here, it does not have the same shape that this charge usually has in German civic coats of arms. See, for instance, Nentershausen's, Neuenstein's or Philippsthal's coat of arms.

The arms come from the early 17th century. The mound stands for the Rotenberg, a mountain on which once stood a castle. From these, the town got its name. The linden sprig comes from old guild seals, which bore a cloverleaf and a star. From this arose the linden sprig, which was adopted as a charge in the town's arms, putting the coat of arms in the “North Hesse Cloverleaf Arms Family” along with Kassel and Felsberg. The first example of the arms now valid in the town was in the Knights’ Hall (Rittersaal), which was torn down in the late 18th century. The first examples on mediaeval town seals show a saint bearing a palm frond before a town gate. It most likely was meant to be the town's patron saint, James the Elder.

=== Town partnerships ===
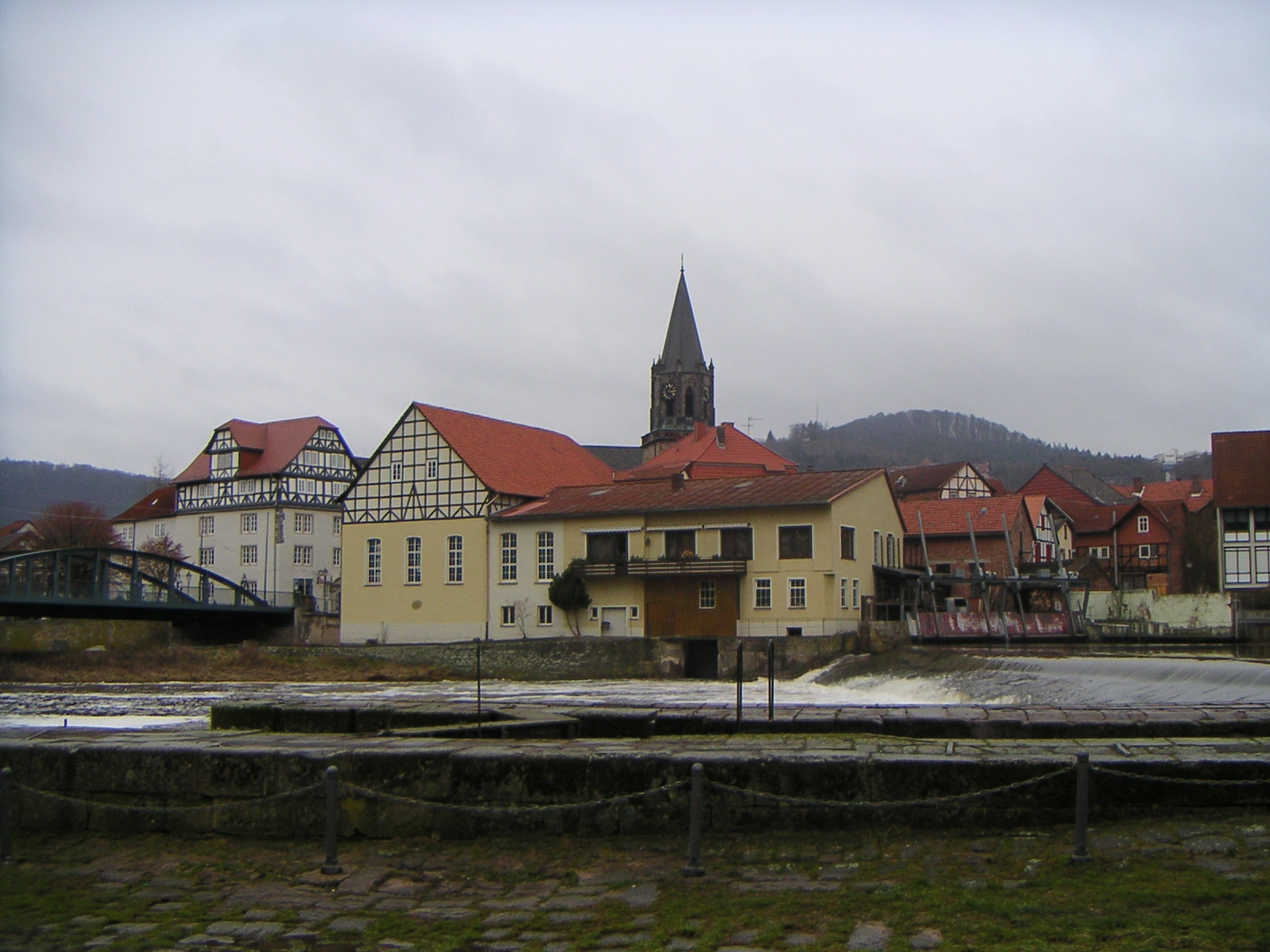
New Town with Fulda weir at high water

- Argentan, Orne, France since 1976
- Gedling, Nottinghamshire, England, United Kingdom since 1978
- Rothenburg, Lucerne, Switzerland since 1988

There are friendship relations with the following towns:

- (Germany) Rotenburg an der Wümme, Lower Saxony
- (Germany) Rothenburg ob der Tauber, Bavaria
- (Germany) Rothenburg, Saxony-Anhalt
- (Germany) Rothenburg, Saxony
- Czerwieńsk, Lubusz Voivodeship, Poland (formerly Rothenburg an der Oder)

== Culture and sightseeing ==
=== Museums ===
- Kreisheimatmuseum Rotenburg (district history)
- Puppen- und Spielzeugmuseum (puppets and toys)
- Memorial and meeting place: the former mikvah

=== Buildings ===
The most important sights in the town are these following:

- Schloss Rotenburg, built in Renaissance style between 1570 and 1607, remodelled about 1790, today houses the Hesse State Financial School, includes preserved side building and palace park.
- Town Hall, built in 1597–1598 and remodelled in the Baroque period; on 23 September 1637 the town was burnt down by Colonel Isolani's people. The statue of Saint James at the Town Hall “fell crashing onto the marketplace and burst asunder” (according to the chronicler).
- Saint James's Parish Church
- Saint Elizabeth and Mary Monastery Church in the New Town, built beginning in 1370, crypt of the Landgraves of Hesse. Only Landgrave Moritz the Learned's son, Hermann, the first Quartfürst of Hesse-Rotenburg is buried here next to his consort Kunigunde Juliane of Anhalt-Zerbst. From this princely house also sprang Russian Tsaritsa Catherine the Great.
- On the Alter Turm (mountain, 418.1 m above sea level) are hidden the ruins of Rodenberg Castle (from about 1150).
- On the Fulda is found an old lock from the 17th century.
- The mikvah, the former Jewish community's ritual bath, since 2006 a memorial and meeting place and Jewish Museum. There are two websites with extensive information, www.mikwe.de and www.hassia-Judaica.de.

Rotenburg further has other historic churches and interesting houses. Even parts of the mediaeval town wall from the 12th and 13th centuries with two round towers are preserved.

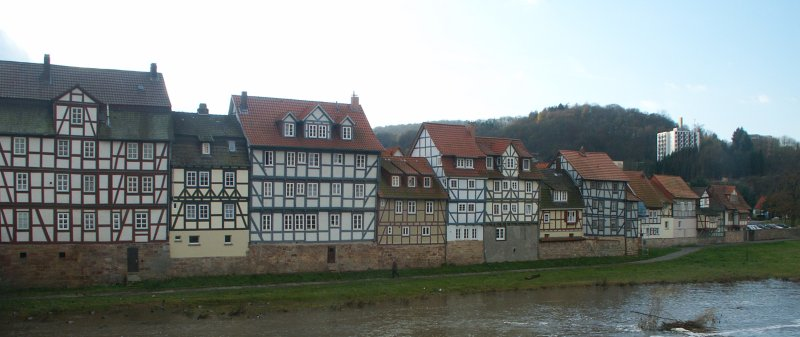
Historic row of houses in Rotenburg an der Fulda

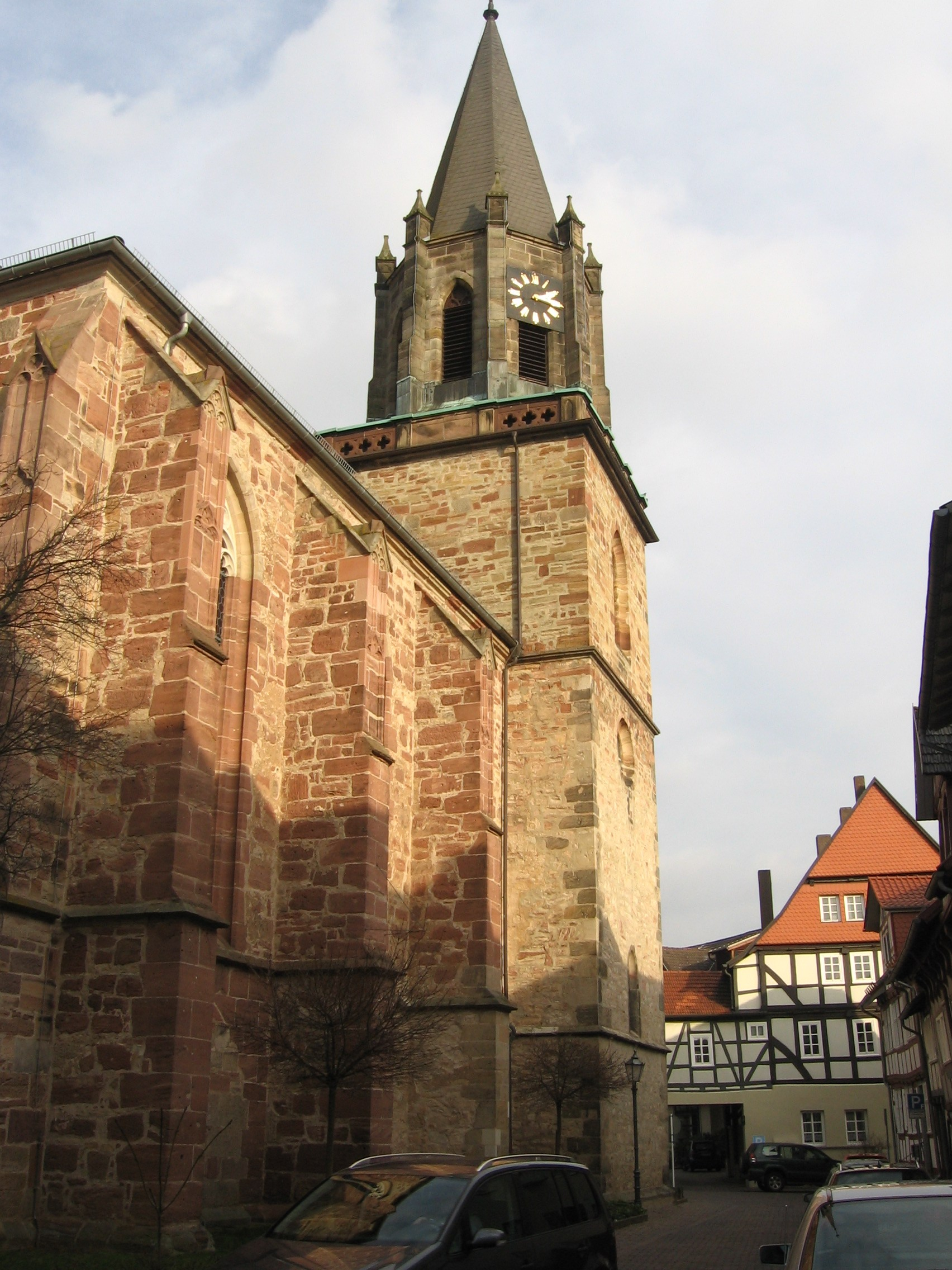
St. Elisabeth und Marien Monastery Church

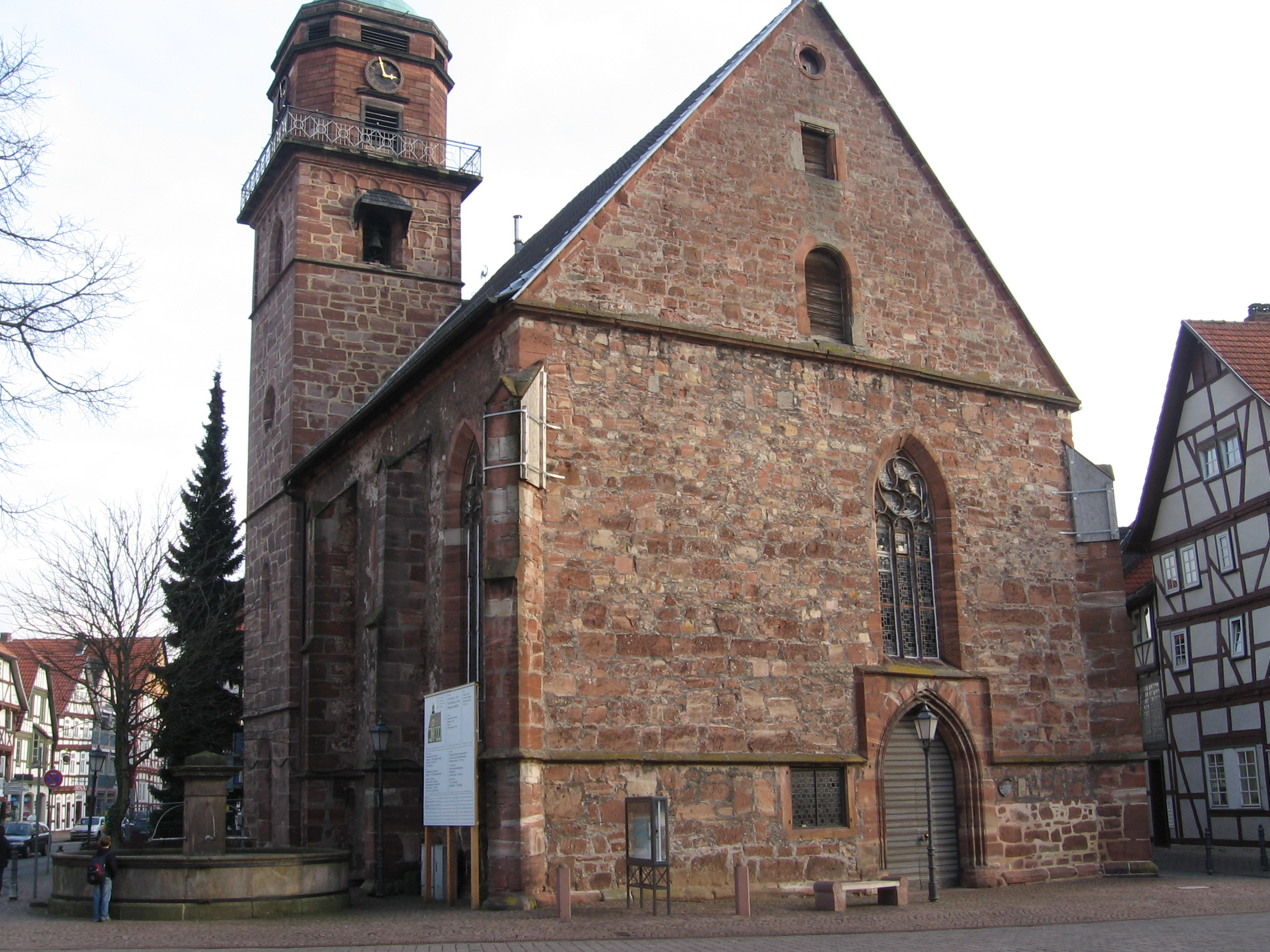
Jakobikirche (St. James's)

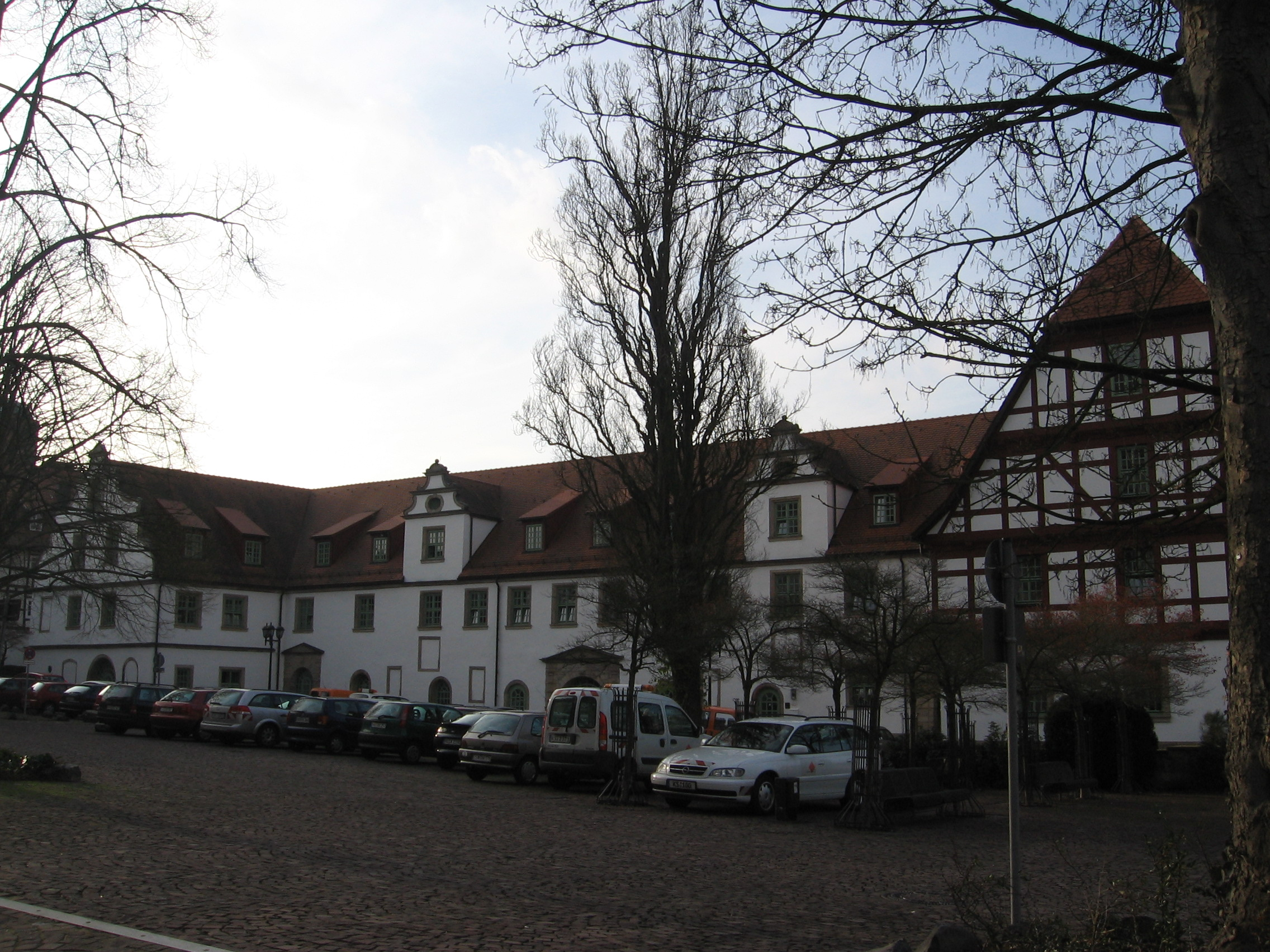
Stable

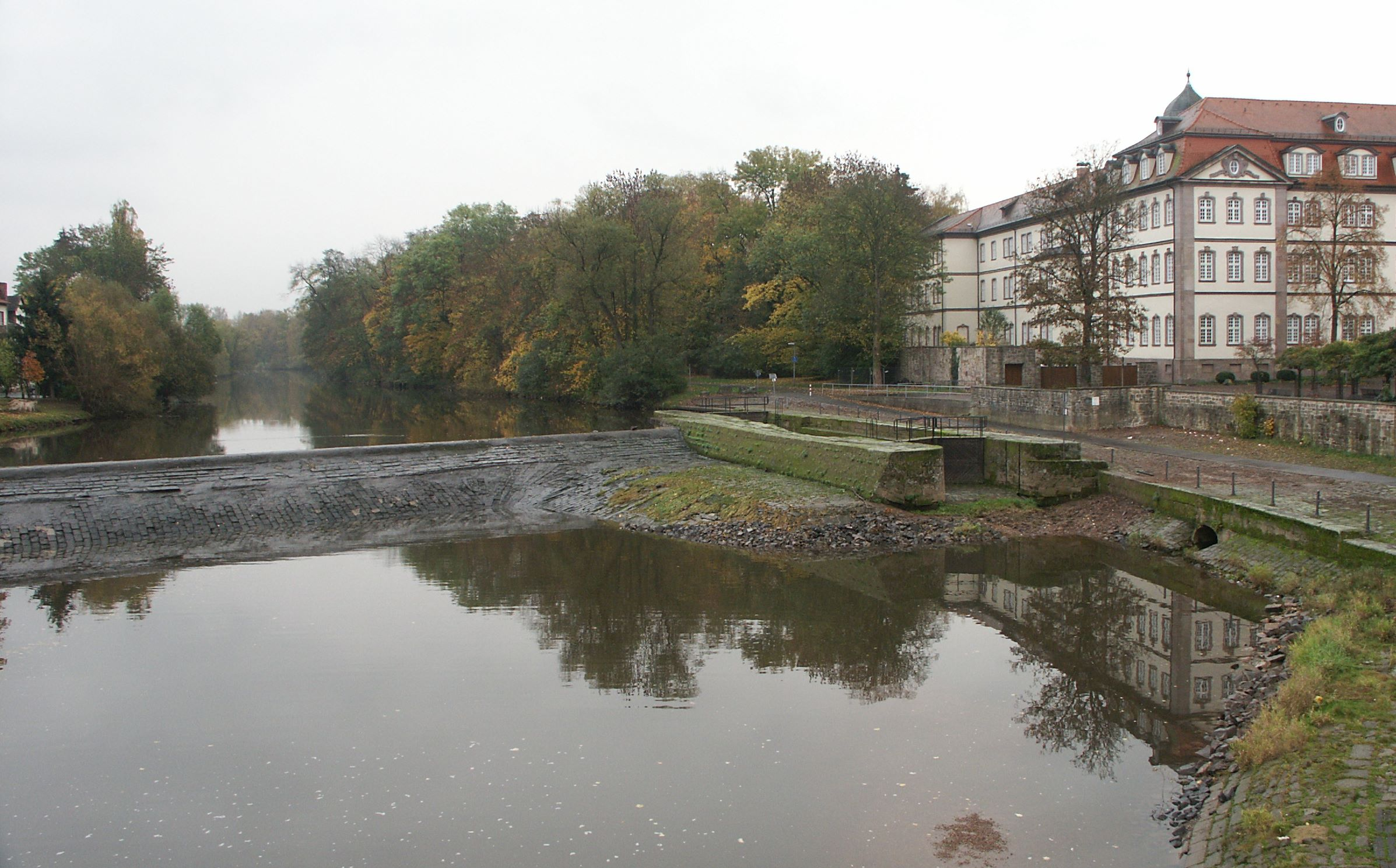
Lock from the 17th century

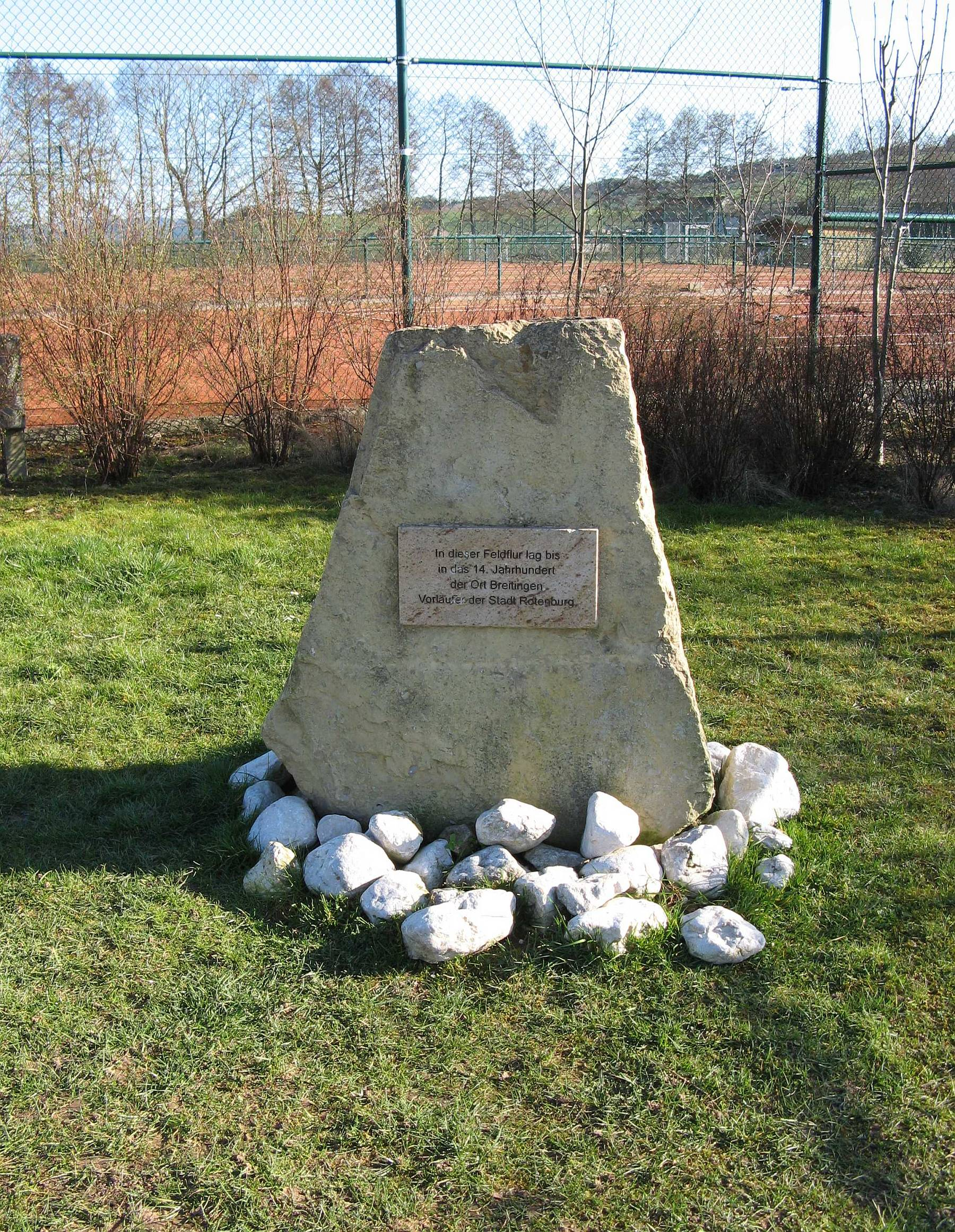
Memorial stone to the community of Breitingen

=== Regular events ===
- Heimat- und Strandfest (“Homeland and Beach Festival”, every year on the first weekend in July)
- Historic Christmas Market on Rotenburg's Marketplace and in adjoining lanes (from early December – 16 days) with Germany's tallest Christmas pyramid
- Kuckucksmarkt (“Cuckoo’s Market”) in the outlying centre of Braach (North Hesse art, craft and farmers’ market held on the last weekend of each month from May to October)

== Economy and infrastructure ==
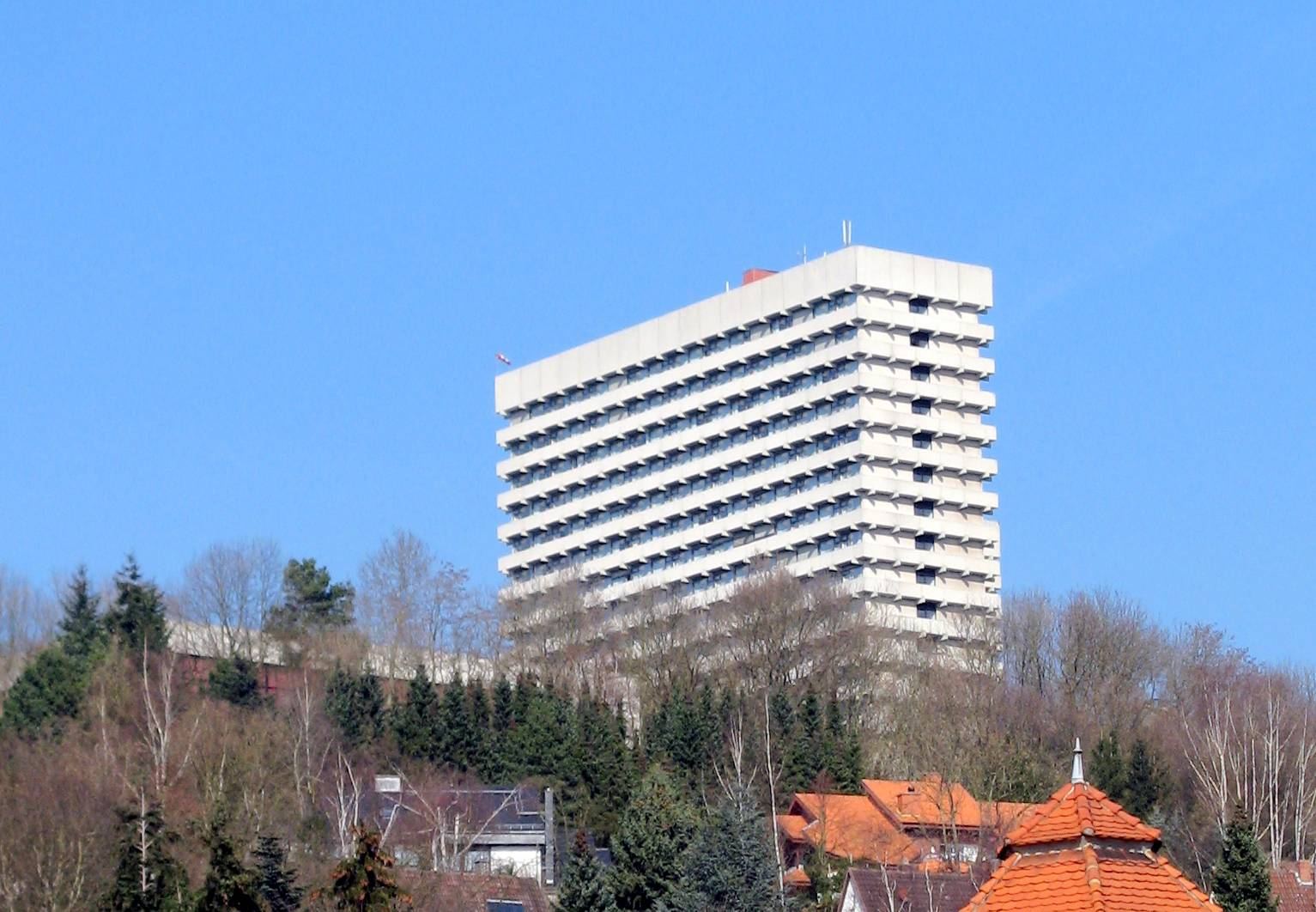
Rotenburg Cardiovascular Centre

Especially important to the town and the whole area is the Herz-Kreislauf-Zentrum (HKZ – Cardiovascular Centre) on the south slope above the town.

As at January 2006, 4,188 workers are employed in town, of which 989 jobs are offered by producing businesses, 2,143 by service providers, 367 by trade, 80 by forestry and agriculture and 609 by other fields of endeavour. There are 1,325 beds dedicated to tourism.

=== Established businesses ===
- RMW Rotenburger Metallwerke GmbH
- C. Brühl Komplementär Textilwerk Rotenburg Verwaltungsgesellschaft mbH (textile specialist in trousers, shirts and jackets)

=== Transport ===
Rotenburg lies on Bundesstraße 83 and on the so-called Friedrich-Wilhelms-Nordbahn (railway), which is nowadays part of the Mitte-Deutschland-Verbindung (“Middle Germany Connection”).

=== Media ===
Hessische/Niedersächsische Allgemeine (daily newspaper) with its Lokalteil Rotenburg Bebra (local section) and the Kreisanzeiger published district-wide.

=== State institutions ===
- Until it was disbanded early in 2006, the Panzergrenadierbataillon 52 (Armoured Grenadier Battalion 52) was stationed at the Alheimer-Kaserne (“Alheim Barracks”). Since July 2006, the newly deployed Führungsunterstützungsbataillon 286 (“Command Support Battalion 286”) have been there. Joining them is the 6th Company of the Feldjägerbataillon 251 (“Military Police Battalion 251”), which was formerly stationed in Schwalmstadt. The FüUstgBtl 286 belongs to the Command Support Regiment 28 in Mechernich and is part of the Bundeswehr’s Streitkräftebasis (SKB).
- Rotenburg Study Centre: Hesse State Financial School, Professional Administration College of the State of Hesse.
- Training and Continuing Education Centre of HSVV “Marstall”
- BKK-Akademie – conference and seminar hotel

=== Education ===
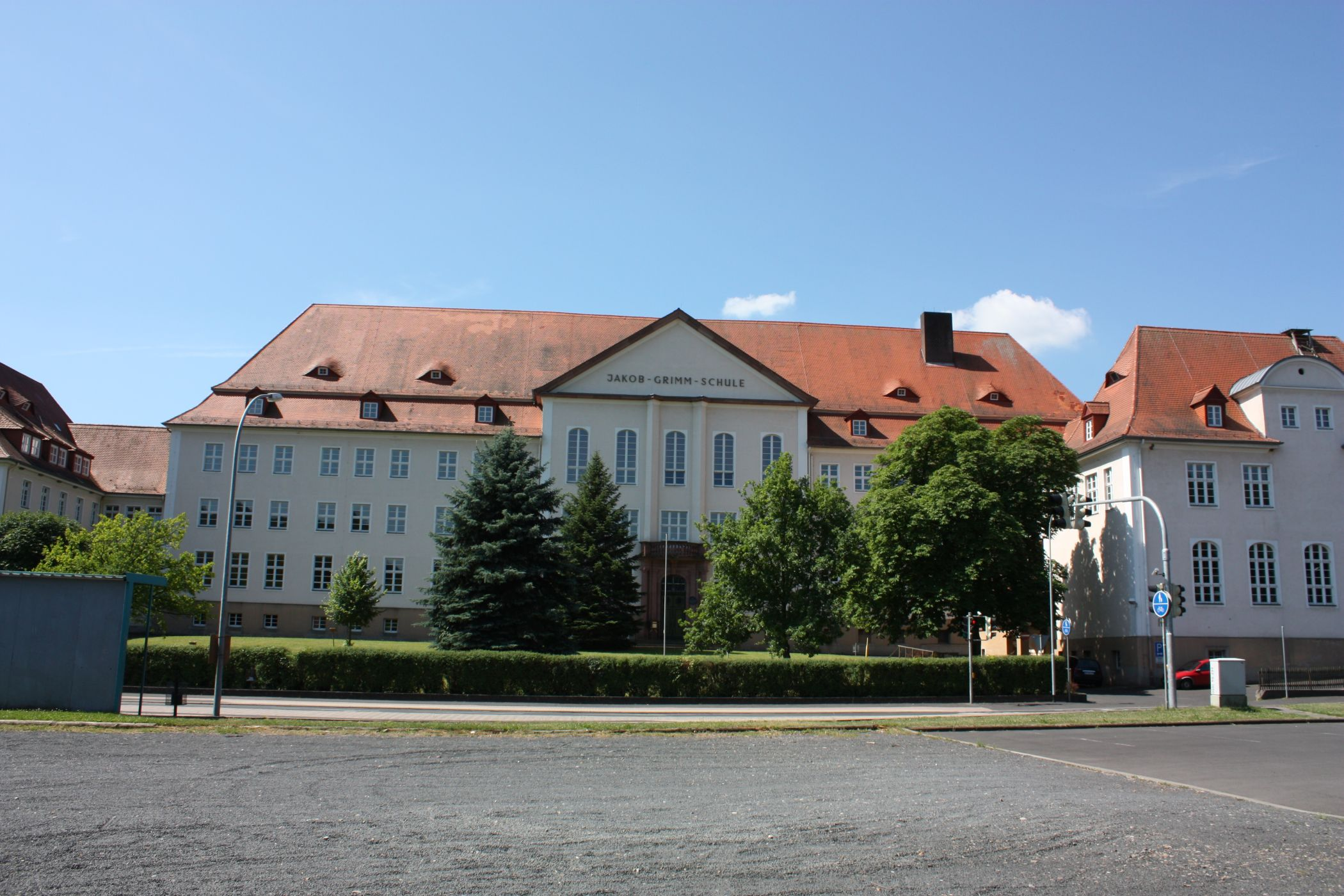
Jakob-Grimm-Schule in Rotenburg

There are ten schools in town, among them the Jakob-Grimm-Schule, which acts as an ancillary comprehensive school with a Gymnasium upper level. There is also the BKK Akademie, where there is training in social insurance law and related themes for those employed in the field.

== Famous people ==
=== Sons and daughters of the town ===
- Chlodwig, Prince of Hohenlohe-Schillingsfürst (born 31 March 1819 in Rotenburg, died 6 July 1901 in Ragaz); politician, Imperial chancellor and Prussian Prime Minister (1894–1900).
- Gustav Adolf Hohenlohe (born 26 February 1823 in Rotenburg; died 30 October 1896 in Rome); German Cardinal.
- Elias Blaubaum (born 19 November 1847 in Rotenburg, died 19 April 1904 in Melbourne), Australian Jewish minister, Beth Din member and communal newspaper editor
- Annette Kurschus (born 14 February 1963), Protestant bishop
- Mareike Morr (born 1977), Operatic mezzo-soprano

=== People associated with the town ===
- Walter Wallmann (born 24 September 1932 in Uelzen), Chief Mayor of Frankfurt am Main, Federal Minister for Environment, Conservation and Reactor Safety (1986–1987), Hessian premier (1987–1991), judge at the Amt court in Rotenburg (1966).
- Günter Schabowski (born 4 January 1929 in Anklam), journalist and politician, member of the Socialist Unity Party of Germany central committee and politburo, editor of the Heimatnachrichten (1993–1999) in Rotenburg.
- Armin Meiwes (born 1 December 1961 in Essen), known as the Rotenburg Cannibal

Grave of WWII British military persons imprisoned at Rotenburg.
