= Schwarzenhasel =

- Stadtteil of Rotenburg an der Fulda
- Interactive map of Schwarzenhasel
- Location within Germany Location within Hesse
- Coordinates: 51°01′18″N 9°46′13″E
- Country: Germany
- State: Hesse
- Admin. region: Kassel
- District: Hersfeld-Rotenburg
- Town: Rotenburg an der Fulda

Government
  - Mayor: Norbert Dräger

Population
  - Total: 431
- Time zone: UTC+01:00 (CET)
  - Summer (DST): UTC+02:00 (CEST)
- Postal codes: 36199
- Dialling codes: 06623
- Vehicle registration: HEF
- Website: www.rotenburg.de

Schwarzenhasel is a village approximately 3 km northeast of Rotenburg an der Fulda in the Hersfeld-Rotenburg district of northeastern Hesse, Germany.

Henry von Holtzheim built a castle in Schwarzenhasel in 1371, which still stands today.
