= Cornberg =

- Municipality
- Coat of arms

- Location of Cornberg within Hersfeld-Rotenburg district
- Interactive map of Cornberg
- Location within Germany Location within Hesse
- Coordinates: 51°3′N 9°52′E
- Country: Germany
- State: Hesse
- Admin. region: Kassel
- District: Hersfeld-Rotenburg
- Subdivisions: 3 districts

Government
  - Mayor (2020–26): Katja Gonzalez Conteras (Ind.)

Area
  - Total: 23.36 km^{2} (9.02 sq mi)
- Elevation: 280–315 m (919–1,033 ft)

Population (2025-12-31)
  - Total: 1,282
  - Density: 54.88/km^{2} (142.1/sq mi)
- Time zone: UTC+01:00 (CET)
  - Summer (DST): UTC+02:00 (CEST)
- Postal codes: 36219
- Dialling codes: 05650
- Vehicle registration: HEF

Cornberg (German pronunciation: [ˈkɔʁnbɛʁk]) is a municipality in Hersfeld-Rotenburg district in northeastern Hesse, Germany. It is the district's smallest municipality.

== Geography ==
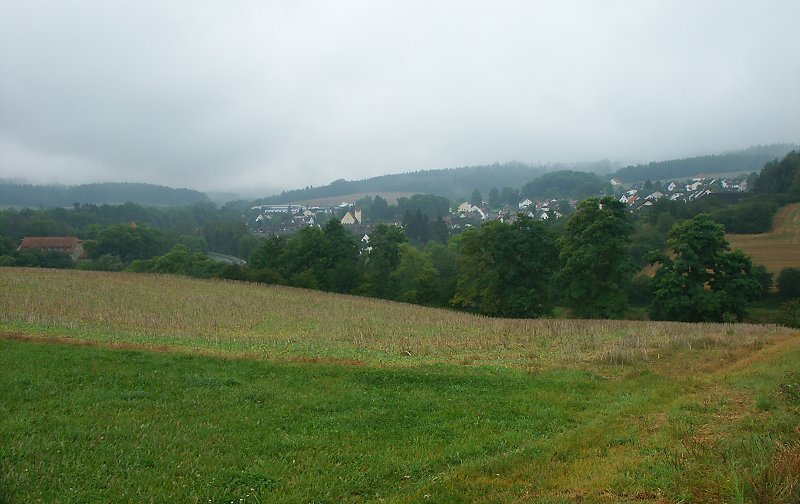
View over Cornberg

=== Location ===
The community lies between the towns of Bad Hersfeld to the south and Eschwege to the north, each 27 km away. The municipal area lies between the Stölzinger Gebirge and the Richelsdorfer Gebirge (ranges), and in the upper reaches of the Sontra, which flows through the outlying centres of Rockensüß and Königswald. Through Cornberg itself flows the brook Cornberger Wasser, which empties into the Sontra near Berneburg (a constituent community of Sontra).

=== Neighbouring communities ===
Cornberg borders in the north on the town of Waldkappel, in the east on the town of Sontra (both in the Werra-Meißner-Kreis), in the southeast on the community of Nentershausen, in the south on the town of Bebra and in the west on the town of Rotenburg an der Fulda (all three in Hersfeld-Rotenburg).

=== Constituent communities ===
Cornberg's Ortsteile are Cornberg, Königswald and Rockensüß.

== History ==
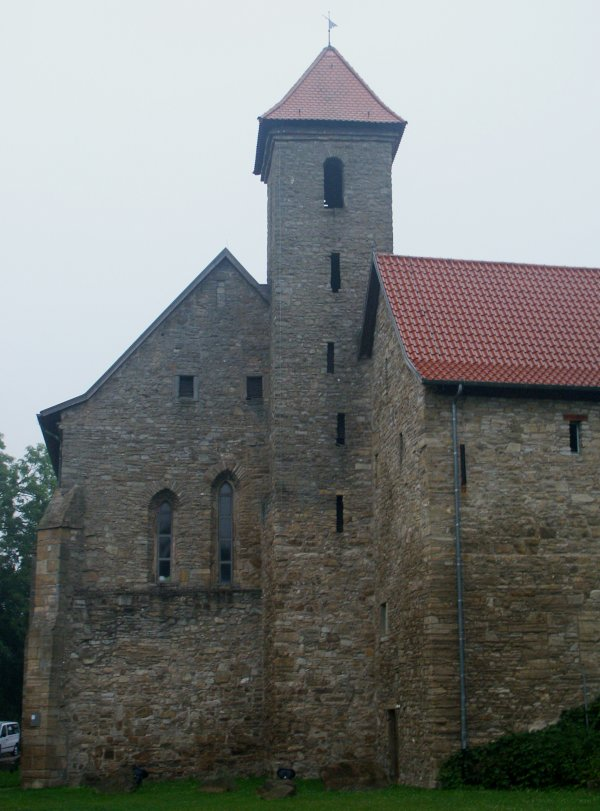
Gothic monastery church (north wing of the cloister) with the adjoining west wing

The outlying centres of Rockensüß and Königswald had their first documentary mentions in 1274 and 1351 respectively. The village of Cornberg was founded only in 1938 as a mining settlement for Electoral-Hessian bituminous shale (Kupferschiefer) mining in the Richelsdorfer Gebirge. It is the only new settlement in the old Rotenburg an der Fulda district to arise since the Thirty Years' War.

There was however, from 1296, a Benedictine monastery here. It was long a provost's seat of Hersfeld Abbey. The monastery was dissolved in 1526 and converted into an agricultural estate. In 1582, Philipp Wilhelm von Cornberg, a son of William IV, Landgrave of Hesse-Kassel born out of wedlock, acquired the monastery and its lands as a fief. Philipp Wilhelm sold it in 1598 to his half-brother Maurice, Landgrave of Hesse-Kassel, who transferred it in 1627 to the so-called Rotenburger Quart. It became a Vogtei that remained in the ownership of the Landgraves of Hesse-Rotenburg until they died out in 1834, whereupon it passed back to the Electorate of Hesse. Until 1964, the former monastery was a state domain of the Land of Hesse. The trade and dwelling buildings around the monastery, which by this time were falling into ruins, were all torn down between 1957 and 1973. Only the Gothic cloister is preserved. Between 1990 and 1994 it was restored. The former two-naved church (the cloister's north wing) with the still preserved nuns’ gallery is used today as a cultural stage. Two other wings house the community centre and the museum. In the east wing is found a gastronomical business.

From 1945 to 1949, the whole community of Cornberg and the monastery were a UNRRA displaced persons camp mainly for people from the Soviet Union and Poland who were conscripted as forced labourers during WWII. Many of them emigrated from here to Canada and the United States. While living in Cornberg, these displaced persons lived in barracks-style accommodations, often many families to one room while they waited for final emigration clearance to their eventual homes overseas.

== Politics ==
=== Community council ===
The municipal election held on 26 March 2006 yielded the following results:

Parties and voter communities		% 2006	Seats; 2006	% 2001	Seats; 2001
CDU	Christian Democratic Union of Germany	15.0	2	15.5	2
SPD	Social Democratic Party of Germany	61.0	9	45.0	7
CBL	Cornberger Bürger Liste	24.0	4	39.5	6
Total		100.0	15	100.0	15
Voter turnout in %		50.7		63.4	

=== Mayor ===
- 2002–2020: Achim Großkurth
- 2020–incumbent: Katja Gonzalez Conteras

=== Coat of arms ===
The community's arms might be described thus: Party per fess, argent a lion passant gules, chequy of five gules and argent.

The community's arms are borrowed from the family arms borne by the Barons of Cornberg, but with somewhat different tinctures. The lion passant (walking with one forepaw upraised) stands for the family's roots, which go back to the Landgraves of Hesse (Hesse's heraldic charge is a red-and-silver-striped lion rampant). The chequer pattern in the family's arms stands for a chessboard, and in those arms takes the tinctures azure, gules and argent (blue, red and silver). The coat of arms was conferred upon the community on 26 February 1981.

=== Amalgamations ===
The community of Königswald was amalgamated on 11 August 1972.

== Economy and infrastructure ==
=== Transport ===
Through the main community of Cornberg run Bundesstraße 27 and the Bebra–Göttingen railway line.

== Culture and sightseeing ==
=== Museums ===
- Heimatkundliches Museum und Sandsteinmuseum Kloster Cornberg (local history and sandstone museum at the Cornberg monastery)
- Sandstone quarry with mineral showcases; places where prehistoric tracks of small saurians from the Permian have been found.

=== Buildings ===
- Cornberg Monastery (built 1296)
- Schloss Rittershain
