= Manfred Katz =

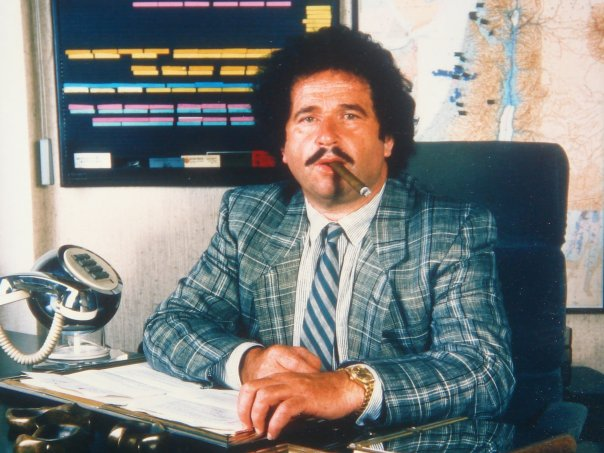
- Katz in 1980
- Born: August 18, 1934; Nentershausen, Hesse, Germany
- Died: July 2, 2006 (aged 71); Hamburg, Germany
- Occupation: restaurateur

Manfred Katz (August 18, 1934 – July 2, 2006) was a German-Israeli restaurateur who established Israel's first pizza chain, Rimini, that had more than 30 branches in Israel during the 1980s. Throughout his life, Katz designed and operated more than 100 restaurants of different cuisines primarily in Germany and Israel. By age 42 Katz had 52 restaurants in Hamburg, Germany including pizza parlors, steakhouses, delis and night clubs. Katz was also often referred to as “the pizza king of Hamburg.”

== Early life ==
Katz was born in Nentershausen (Hessen), Germany, to Martha and Willi Katz, a shoemaker. Manfred has two brothers Bert and a twin brother Carlos Katz. From the time the Nazis came to power, the family had faced racial discrimination and religious persecution, as well as dispossession of their property and denial of their right of existence. In November 1938, Willi Katz was badly abused by members of the Sturmabteilung, the shoemaking business premises and the apartment were devastated. After difficult means to arrange the escape, in late September 1940, Katz family members were among the very last three groups of German Jews to successfully flee to safety. The journey went across the Soviet Union on the Trans-Siberian Railway to Vladivostok, from there by train through Japanese occupied Manchuria (China) and Korea, by ferry to Japan, across Japan by train, and by ship from Japan to South America. Ecuador was a country that still accepted Jews when very few other countries would, where they finally settled. The family was living in the Andes between a tribe of the Quechua people. Agricultural work was a prerequisite for guest rights. Later, they stayed in the capital Quito when it was allowed. Given the cultural gap, Manfred dropped out of school after a few years. He had a passion for boxing and became a successful boxer and won the Ecuadorian championship. When a delegation travelled to East Berlin, Katz participated in the World Youth championship.

In 1952, with very little money Katz travelled via a ship to a Kibbutz in Israel where he established. Katz joined the Israeli army. Through coincidence, his unit was involved in a fight on 21. August 1955, from which Katz emerged as a hero. He got a high award, Medal of Courage, for bravery in combat. This in turn brings Katz to an elite unit of parachutists. It is alleged that Katz worked for the Israeli secret service Mossad in the 1960s.

== Career ==
The Rimini company was founded in September 1957 by Katz. Katz is famous for being the first to introduce Italian food and the concept of pizza in Israel. He opened one of the first restaurant of the chain, called "Zafra" in Beersheba. Zafra was a restaurant -nightclub, where young singers, just beginning their careers, were invited to perform. Many of these novices later rose to national fame, and some - such as Yafa Yarkoni, Aris San, Aliza Kashi and Tzadok Savir - gained international recognition. Over the years many more Rimini restaurants were opened around Israel, in every major city. Rimini pizzas and other dishes were very popular around the country and various marketing surveys have given Rimini the first place for "best product" in its category.

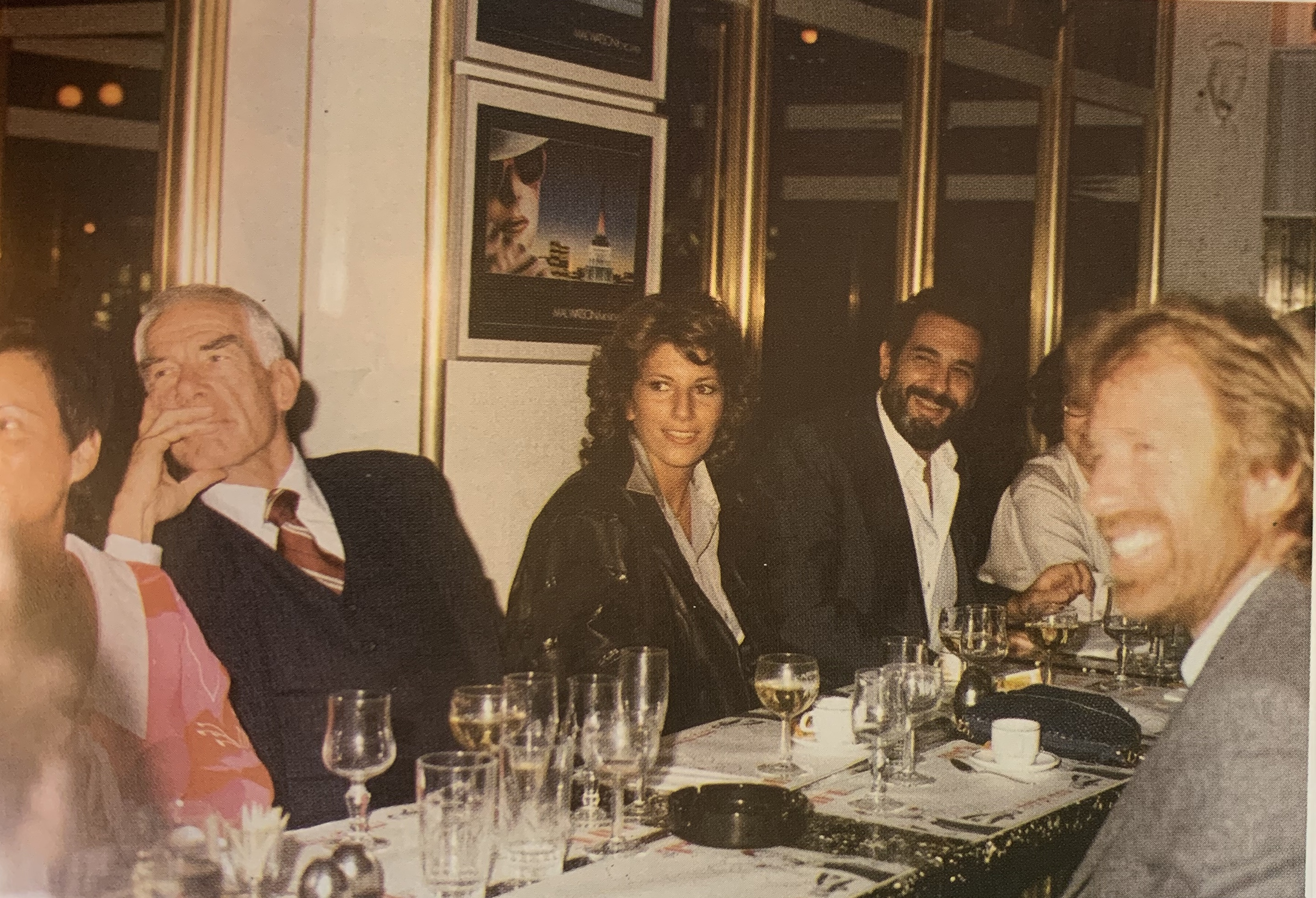
Le Gastronome (restaurant part of the Rimini Company). A festive diner with Plácido Domingo, Chuck Norris, Sylviane Katz (wife of Manfred Katz) and Lee Marvin

In Europe, the first restaurant of the chain opened in Hamburg in 1964. It was called "Los Indios" and its menu consisted of South-American specialties. Following its success, other restaurants, pubs, cafes, discotheques, fast-foods, conditories and a casino were opened. By the 1970s, the company employed more than 250 people. Simultaneously a factory for the production of frozen pizzas was established to supply supermarket chains and delis.

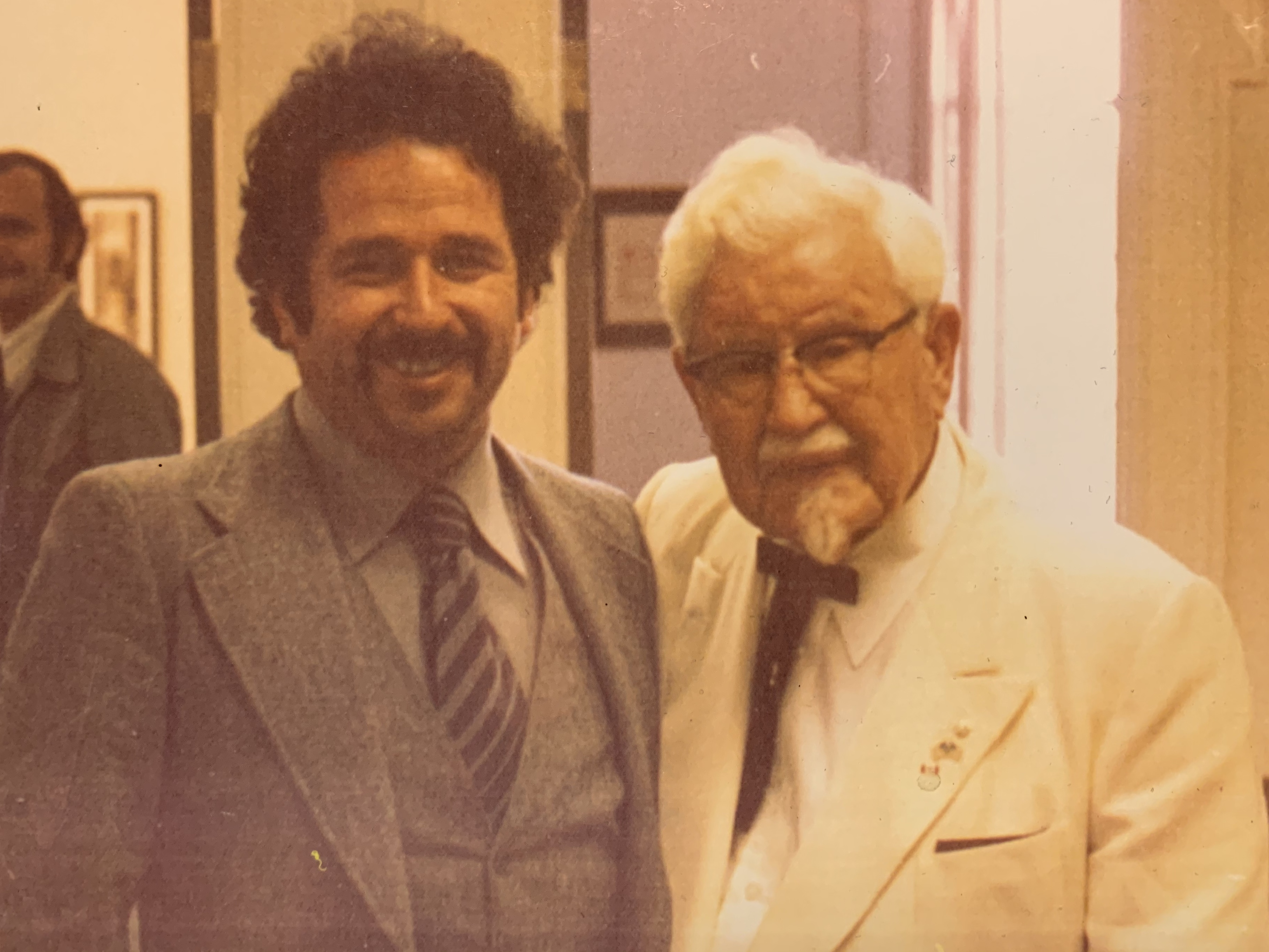
Manfred Katz together with Colonel Harland David Sanders (founder of KFC)

Restaurants of the Rimini Company were characterized by their innovative architecture and special food techniques. The "Baloon" ice-cream parlors in Israel for example, were supplied from a plant that produces ice-cream solely for the chain's stores. The ice-cream was made by hand, of purely natural ingredients, prepared by specialists recruited from South-America. The Dello Pub in Hamburg is worth mentioning, because of its unique interior design. The tables and chairs of the pub were actually reconstructed models of antique cars - and meals were served to people who sit inside the cars. The decoration of the City Rock Cafe in Hamburg included original US military jets from the Vietnam war, a Helicopter cockpit on the dancefloor from where the DJ performed, a Harley-Davidson in the middle of the bar and a Cadillac hanging in the entrance. Last restaurant that Katz acquired and restructured was the cult-reference Schwenders in 2005.

== Personal life ==
Katz was first married to Elisabeth Katz with whom he had two children, Avivit and Eitan. Katz had a dazzling career, starting from a residential camp when arriving back to Germany in the 1960s to become a millionaire. At the height of his career, Katz had a large lifestyle, bought seven racing horses in Hamburg-Farmsen, spent time with prominent figures and was a close friend to film and singing artist Daliah Lavi. Katz married a second time in 1982 to Sylviane Katz, with whom they had 3 children, Yarom, Shiran and Lior. Katz has been active in philanthropy such as the donation of funds to build a synagogue in a hospital in Petah Tikva, Israel. Katz died on July 2, 2006, in Hamburg at the age of 72 and has been buried in Petah Tikva Segula Cemetery.
