= Nentershausen, Hesse =

Nentershausen
- Municipality
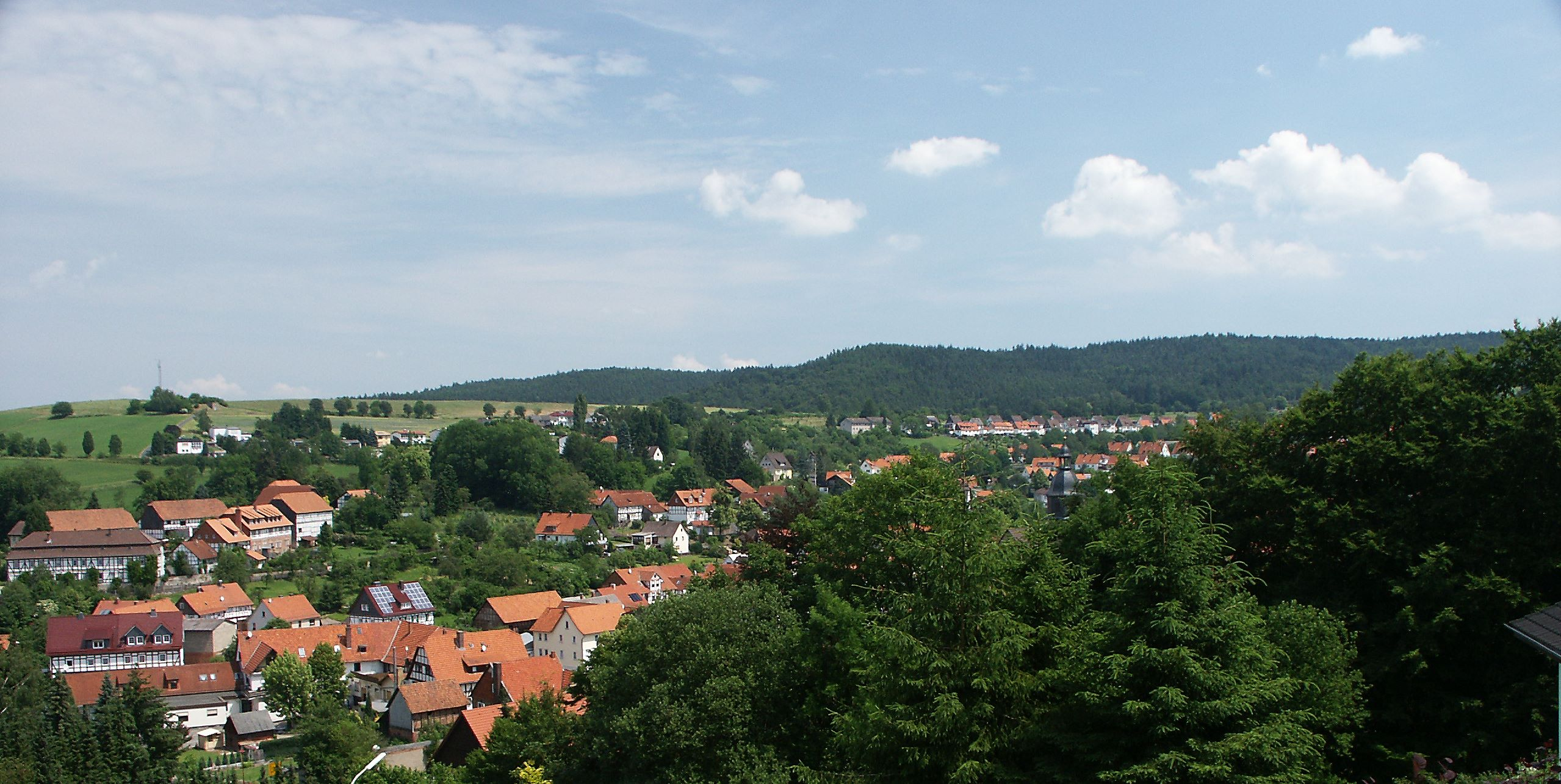
- View over Nentershausen (main centre)

- Coat of arms

- Location of Nentershausen within Hersfeld-Rotenburg district
- Interactive map of Nentershausen
- Location within Germany Location within Hesse
- Coordinates: 51°0′45″N 9°56′6″E
- Country: Germany
- State: Hesse
- Admin. region: Kassel
- District: Hersfeld-Rotenburg

Government
  - Mayor (2018–24): Ralf Hilmes (SPD)

Area
  - Total: 57.05 km^{2} (22.03 sq mi)
- Elevation: 299 m (981 ft)

Population (2025-12-31)
  - Total: 2,320
  - Density: 40.7/km^{2} (105/sq mi)
- Time zone: UTC+01:00 (CET)
  - Summer (DST): UTC+02:00 (CEST)
- Postal codes: 36214
- Dialling codes: 06627
- Vehicle registration: HEF
- Website: www.nentershausen.de

Nentershausen (German pronunciation: [nɛntɐsˈhaʊzn̩]) is a municipality in Hersfeld-Rotenburg district in northeastern Hesse, Germany.

== Geography ==
=== Location ===
The community lies in the mountains in eastern Hesse, where it finds itself in the centre of the Richelsdorfer Gebirge (range) between the Fulda to the west and the Werra to the east. The municipal area lies in the Hasel drainage basin whose namesake river empties into the river Sontra near Sontra.

The nearest major towns are Bad Hersfeld (some 25 km to the southwest), Eisenach (some 30 km to the east) and Eschwege (some 25 km to the north).

=== Neighbouring communities ===
Nentershausen borders in the north and east on the town of Sontra (in the Werra-Meißner-Kreis), in the southeast on the community of Wildeck, in the south on the community of Ronshausen and in the west on the town of Bebra and the community of Cornberg (all in Hersfeld-Rotenburg).

=== Constituent communities ===
Nentershausen's Ortsteile, besides the main centre, also called Nentershausen, are Bauhaus, Dens, Mönchhosbach, Süß and Weißenhasel.

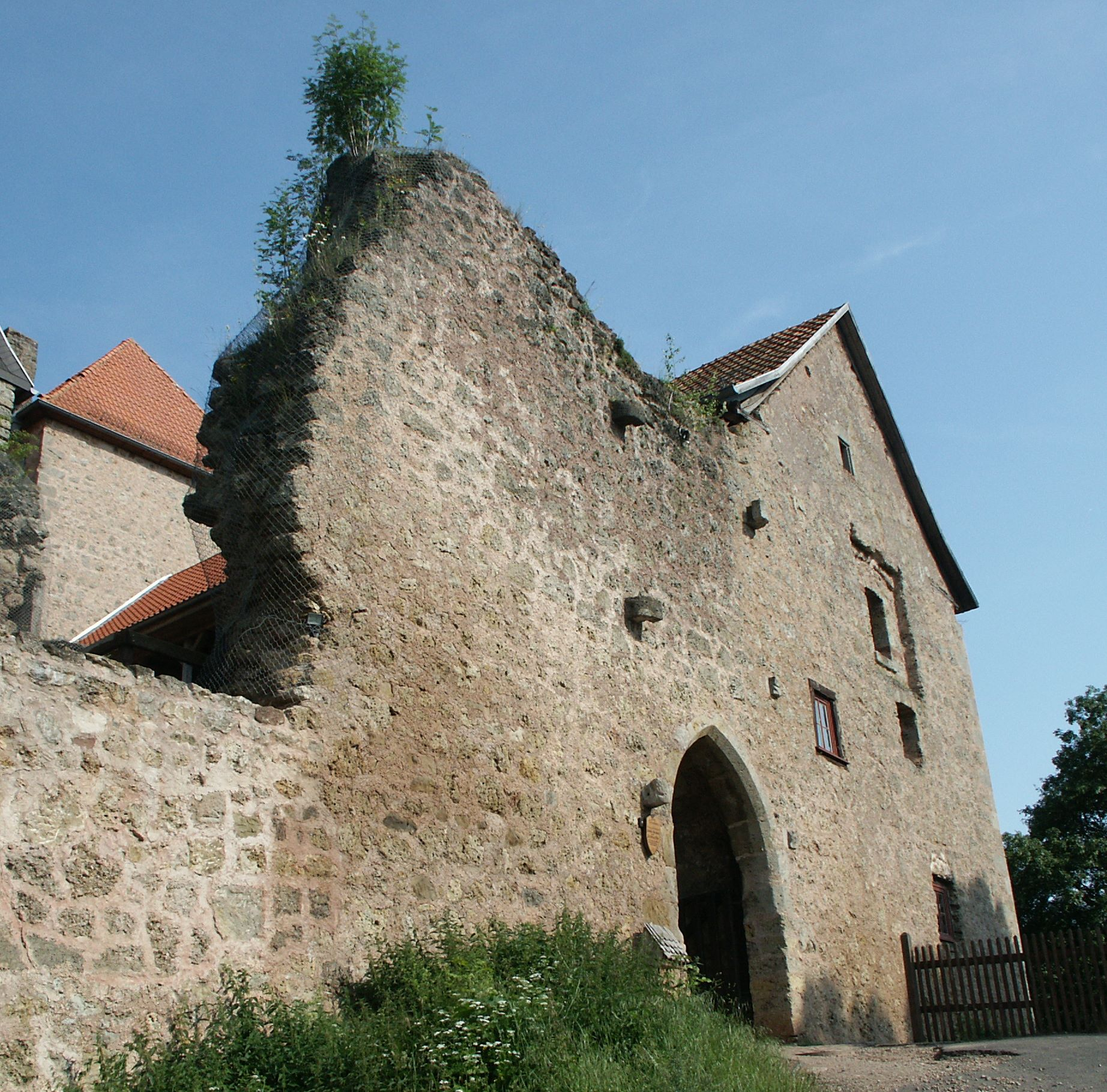
Tannenberg Castle

== History ==
The first documentary mention of any of the constituent communities came from an interest register from the monastery at Helmershausen (nowadays part of the unitary community of Rhönblick), wherein Hasels is mentioned in 1120 as Hasolo in Thuringia. Tense followed in 1195 and Susse in 1267, which Hermann von Trott had acquired as a Lauterberg fief. The other places followed in the course of the 14th century.

About 1300, Ludwig I of Baumbach built Tannenberg Castle.

=== Amalgamations ===
In the course of municipal reform, the above-named communities merged into the greater community of Nentershausen on 31 December 1971.

== Politics ==
=== Community council ===
The municipal election held on 26 March 2006 yielded the following results:

| Parties and voter communities | | % 2006 | Seats; 2006 | % 2001 | Seats; 2001 |
| CDU | Christian Democratic Union of Germany | 36.5 | 8 | 36.4 | 8 |
| SPD | Social Democratic Party of Germany | 63.5 | 15 | 63.6 | 15 |
| Total | | 100.0 | 23 | 100.0 | 23 |
| Voter turnout in % | | 61.9 | | 67.1 | |

=== Mayors ===
The former mayor Lothar Schmidt (SPD) was elected to a fourth term on 10 September 2000 with 90.6% of the vote. He had first been elected on 17 December 1982 for a term beginning on 1 January 1983. On 3 September 2006, Ralf Hilmes (SPD) was elected with 71.7% of the vote, thereby unseating Lothar Schmidt as the mayor on 1 January 2007.

=== Coat of arms ===
The community's arms might be described thus: Party per fess embattled of six vert a chief counter-sapiné of three argent, argent a mount of three of the first, surmounted by a sledgehammer and a cross-peen hammer per saltire Or.

Although the arms shown in this article show the two tools in silver (white), the German blazon says that this charge should be gold.

The coat of arms was conferred upon the community on 4 November 1981 by the Hessian Minister of the Interior.

The fir trees in the upper part of the escutcheon refer to the community's wealth in woodland. The six battlements symbolize the six constituent communities and Tannenberg Castle. The mining tools refer to the community's historical mining. Until the mid 20th century, bituminous shale (Kupferschiefer) was mined in Nentershausen.

=== Town partnerships ===
- Ligueil, Indre-et-Loire, France since 1990
- (Germany) Trusetal, Thuringia since 1990
- (Germany) Bezirk Steglitz, today Bezirk Steglitz-Zehlendorf in Berlin, since 1966

There was once a sponsorship arrangement with 4 Company of the Armoured Reconnaissance Battalion (Panzeraufklärungsbataillon) 5 in Sontra. This came to an end on 31 December 2007 when the battalion was disbanded.

== Culture and sightseeing ==
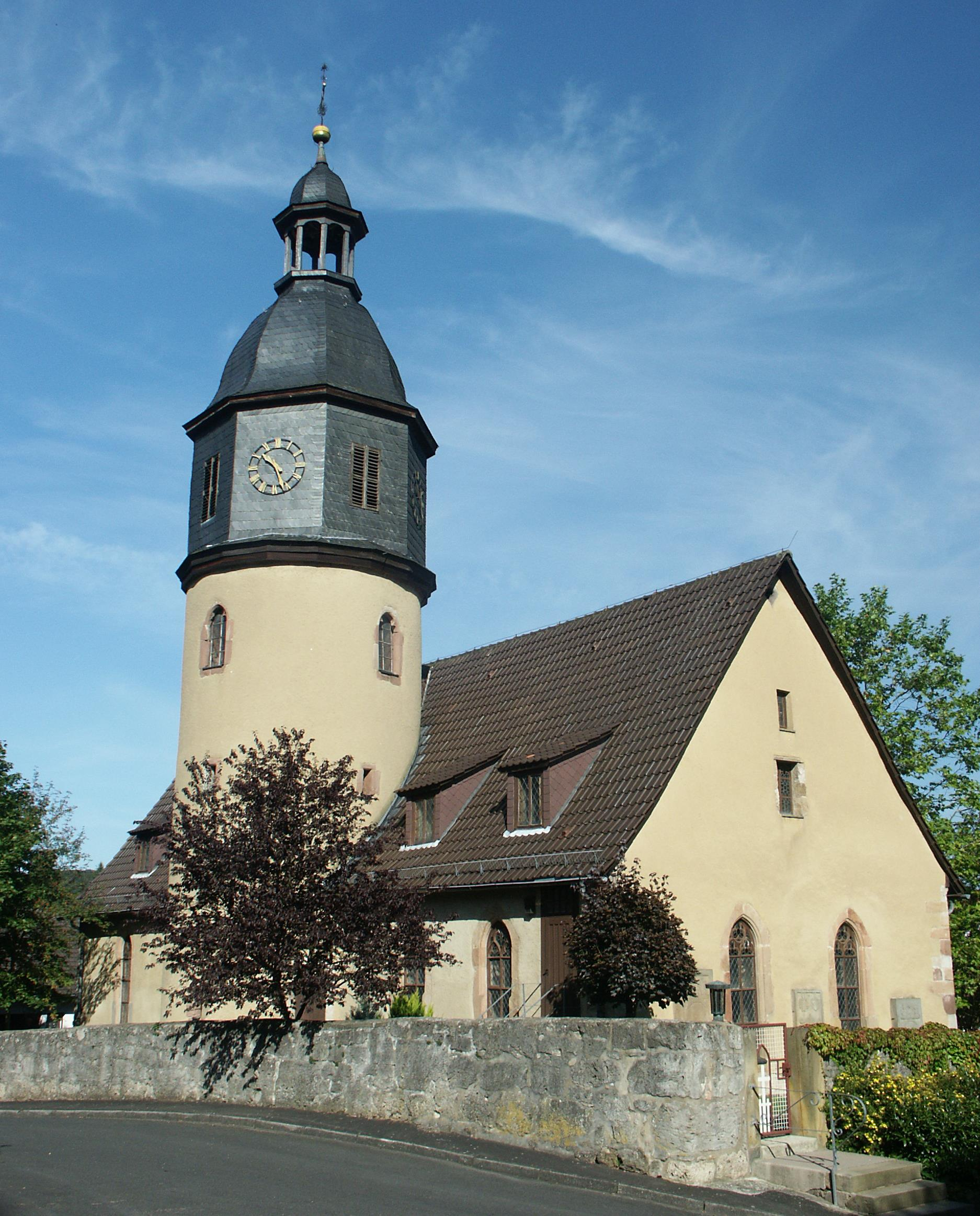
Church in Nentershausen

=== Museums ===
- Heimat und Bergbau Museum (“Local and Mining Museum”), in the former Amt court,

=== Buildings ===
- Tannenberg Castle, built in the 13th century in the Gothic style, since 1360 owned by the family von Baumbach
- Nentershausen Evangelical Church, remodelled between 1696 and 1706 in the Baroque style
- Timber-frame town hall in Nentershausen

=== Natural monuments ===
In Nentershausen stands a protected village or court linden tree that is some 600 years old.

=== Regular events ===
- Denser Seefest (“Lake Festival”)
- Burgfest (“Castle Festival”) at Tannenberg Castle

== Famous people ==
=== Sons and daughters of the town ===
- Henriette Dorothea (Dortchen) Wild, wed Wilhelm Grimm in 1825
- Franz Brandl, Theodor Heuss awarded the miner the first Bundesverdienstkreuz in 1951.
- Manfred Katz (1934–2006) - restauntuer

=== People associated with the community ===
- Adolph Freiherr Knigge, wed Henriette von Baumbach in 1773, whose Tannenberg estates and castle are found here; he also lived here for a while
