= Alheimer =

Hill in Hesse, Germany

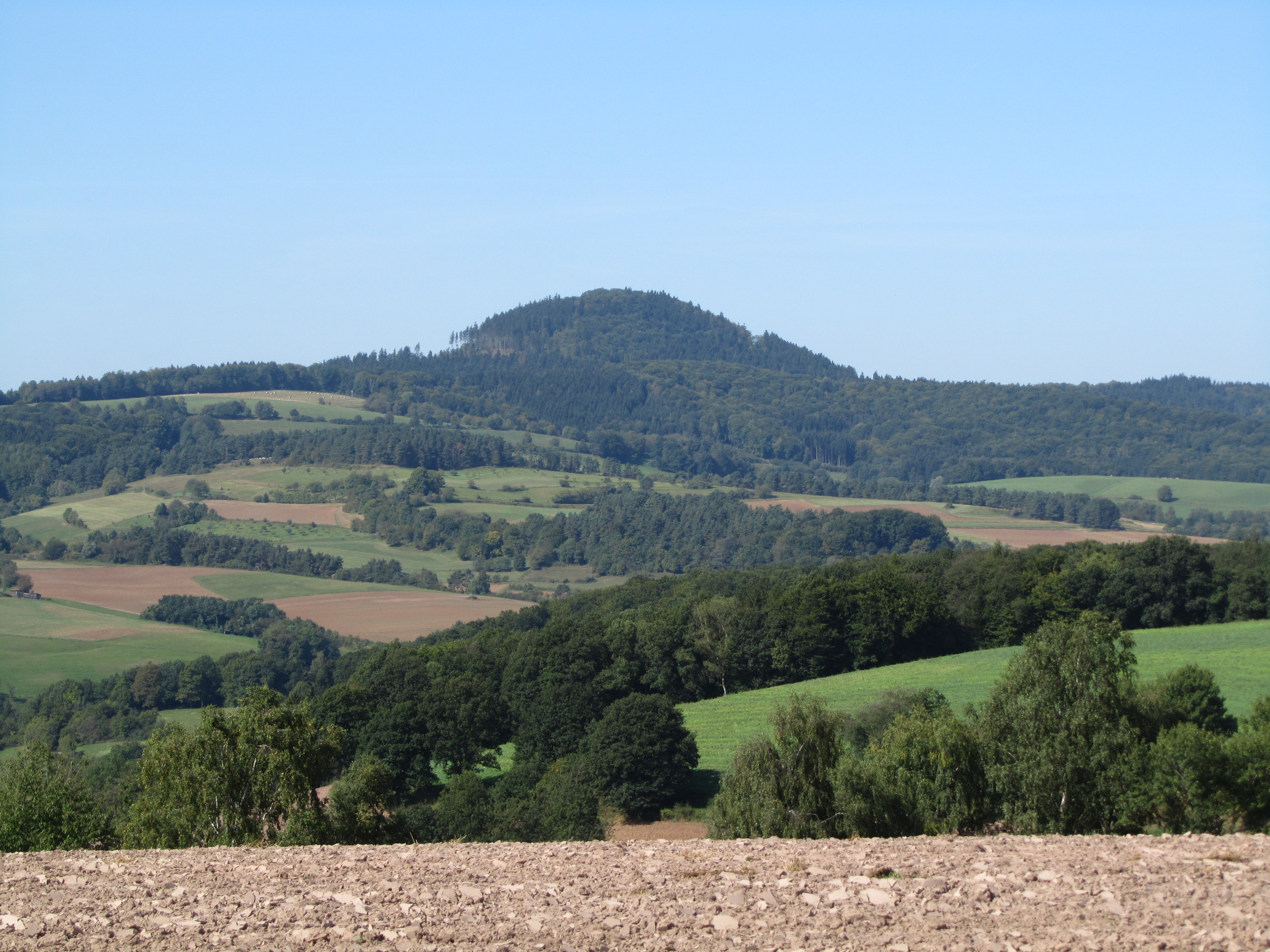
- The Alheimer

Highest point
- Elevation: 548 m (1,798 ft)
- Coordinates: 51°02′12″N 9°43′54″E

Geography
- Location within Hesse
- Location: Hesse, Germany

The Alheimer is a hill in Hesse, Germany.

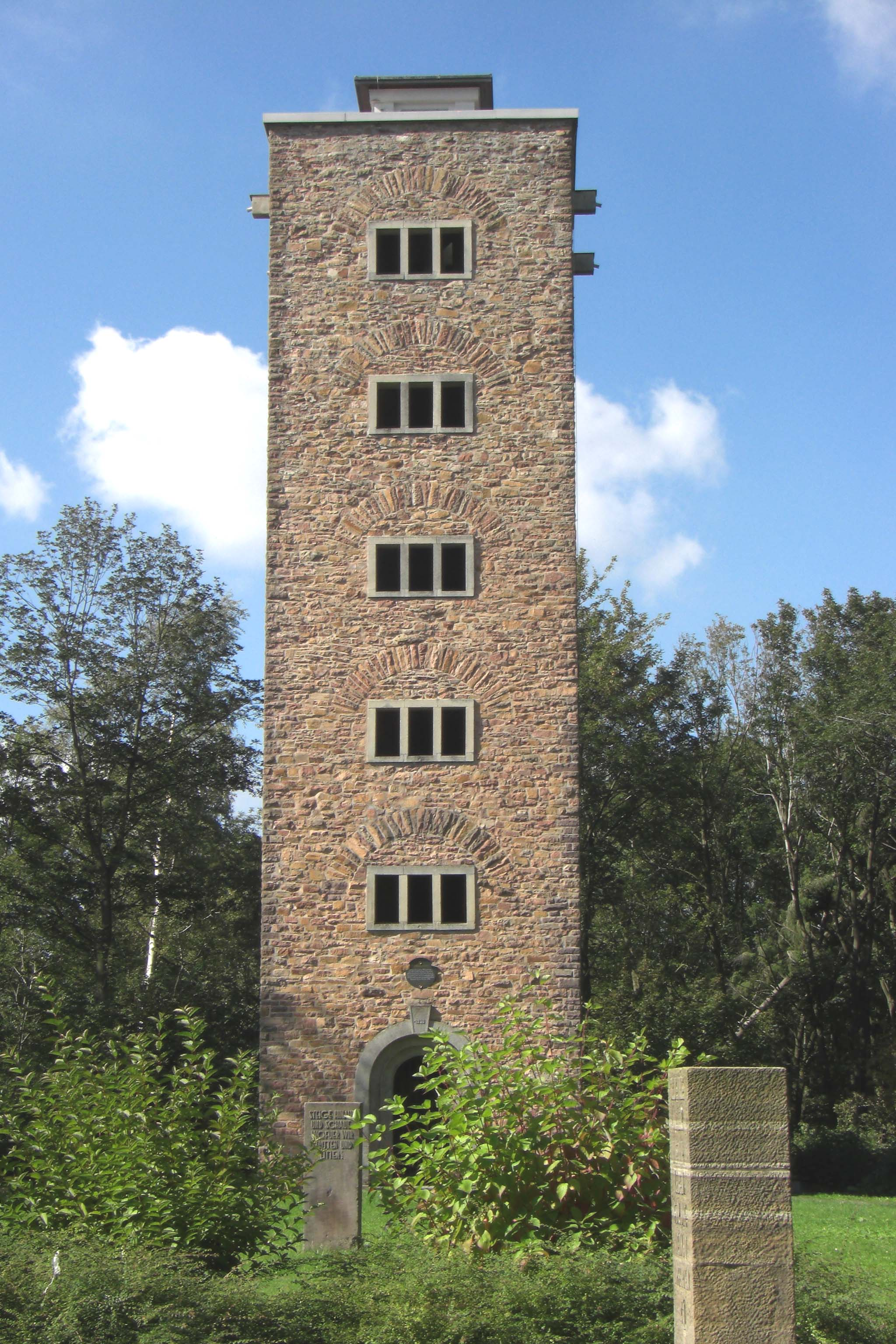
The Alheimer Tower

The Alheimer is located in the Stölzinger Hills. The nearby village of Alheim is named after the hill. On top of the Alheimer is an observation tower, The Alheimer Tower (Alheimer-Turm). The tower is 22 metres (72 ft) high and surrounded by a memorial site to the soldiers forced to fight in the two world wars. In clear weather visitors on the tower's observation deck can see the Wartburg near Eisenach, the Meißner mountain in the Knüllgebirge range, the Rhön Mountains and the Habichtswald near Kassel.

There is only a narrow footpath to the top of the hill.
